= Polish Academy Award for Best Film Score =

Annual Polish film award

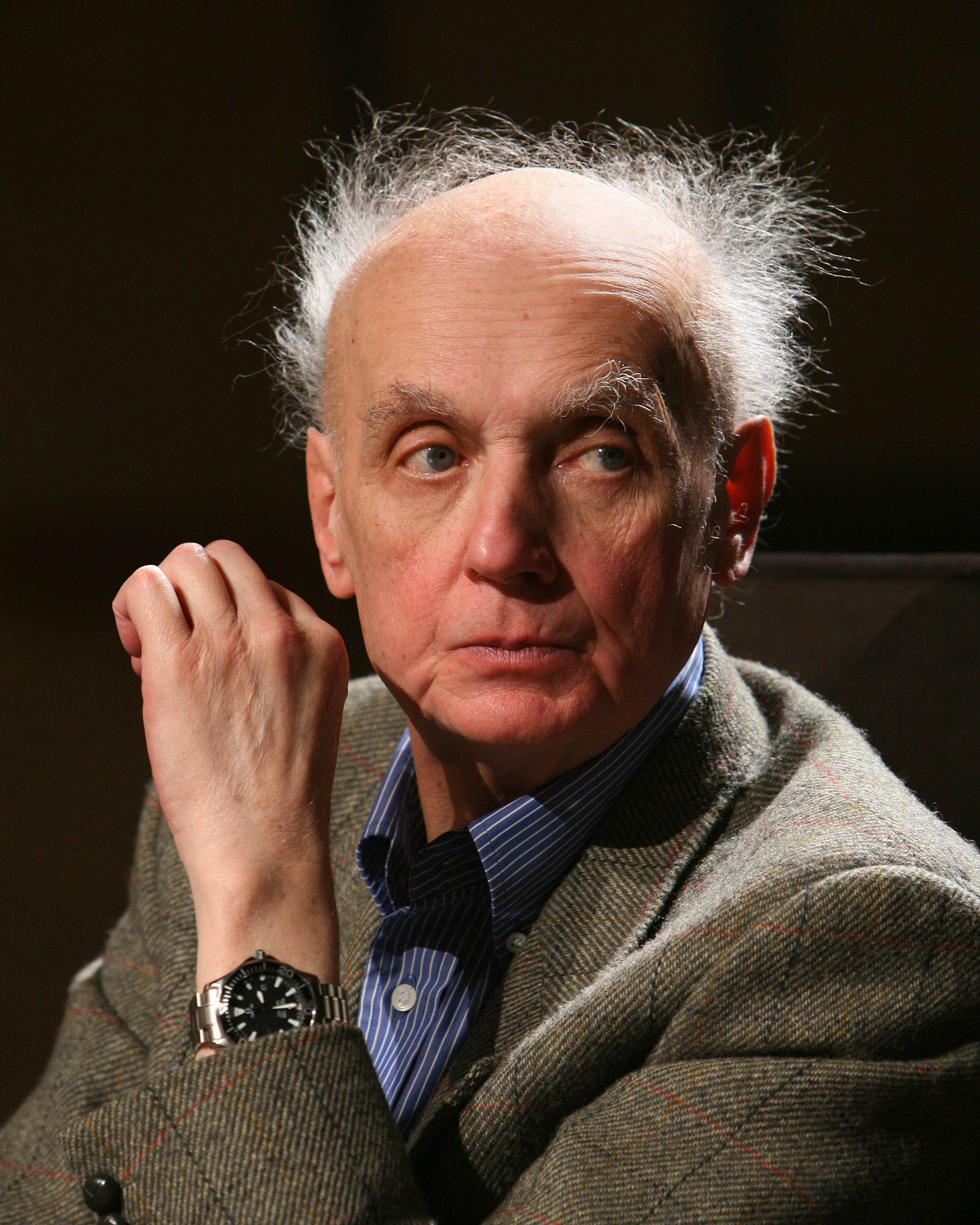
Repeated winner Wojciech Kilar

The Polish Academy Award for Best Film Score is an annual award given to the best Polish film score of the year.

== Winners and nominees ==
Year	Movie title	Composer
1999	Historia kina w Popielawach	Zygmunt Konieczny
1999	Ciemna strona Wenus	Krzesimir Dębski
1999	Demony wojny wg Goi	Marcin Pospieszalski
1999	Kroniki domowe	Wojciech Waglewski
1999	Łóżko Wierszynina	Tomasz Stańko
2000	Pan Tadeusz	Wojciech Kilar
2000	Dług	Michał Urbaniak
2000	Egzekutor	Tomasz Stańko
2000	Ogniem i mieczem	Krzesimir Dębski
2000	Tydzień z życia mężczyzny	Wojciech Kilar
2001	Życie jako śmiertelna choroba przenoszona drogą płciową	Wojciech Kilar
2001	Córy szczęścia	Jan Kanty Pawluśkiewicz
2001	Prawo ojca	Marcin Pospieszalski
2001	Prymas - trzy lata z tysiąca	Zygmunt Konieczny
2001	Syzyfowe prace	Jerzy Matuszkiewicz
2002	Wiedźmin	Grzegorz Ciechowski
2002	Cisza	Tomasz Stańko
2002	Mała Vilma	Jan Kanty Pawluśkiewicz
2002	Quo Vadis	Jan A. P. Kaczmarek
2002	Szczęśliwy człowiek	Zygmunt Konieczny
2003	Pianista	Wojciech Kilar
2003	Dzień świra	Jerzy Satanowski
2003	Edi	Wojciech Lemański
2003	Suplement	Wojciech Kilar
2003	Zemsta	Wojciech Kilar
2004	Pornografia	Zygmunt Konieczny
2004	Nienasycenie	Leszek Możdżer
2004	Stara Baśń. Kiedy słońce było bogiem	Krzesimir Dębski
2005	Wesele	Tymon Tymański
2005	Mój Nikifor	Bartłomiej Gliniak
2005	Ono	Paweł Mykietyn
2005	Pręgi	Adrian Konarski
2006	Persona non grata	Wojciech Kilar
2006	Jestem	Michael Nyman
2006	Komornik	Bartłomiej Gliniak
2006	Skazany na bluesa	Dżem
2006	Tulipany	Daniel Bloom
2006	The Call of the Toad	Richard G. Mitchell
2007	Jasminum	Zygmunt Konieczny
2007	Palimpsest	Bartłomiej Gliniak
2007	Plac Zbawiciela	Paweł Szymański
2008	Katyń	Krzysztof Penderecki
2008	Krowód	Paweł Szymański
2008	Pora umierać	Włodzimierz Pawlik
2009	33 sceny z życia	Paweł Mykietyn
2009	Serce na dłoni	Wojciech Kilar
2009	Środa, czwartek rano	Paweł Szymański
2010	Rewers	Włodzimierz Pawlik
2010	Rewizyta	Wojciech Kilar
2010	Tatarak	Paweł Mykietyn
2011	Essential Killing	Paweł Mykietyn
2011	Święty interes	Zygmunt Konieczny
2011	Wszystko, co kocham	Daniel Bloom
2012	Czarny czwartek. Janek Wiśniewski padł	Michał Lorenc
2012	Młyn i krzyż	Lech Majewski Józef Skrzek
2012	W ciemności	Antoni Łazarkiewicz
2013	Komeda, Komeda...	Krzysztof Komeda; Mariusz Ostański
2013	Drogówka	Mikołaj Trzaska
2013	Rzeź	Alexandre Desplat
2014	Papusza	Jan Kanty Pawluśkiewicz
2014	Mój biegun	Mateusz Pospieszalski
2014	Wenus w futrze	Alexandre Desplat
2015	Sen o Warszawie	Czesław Niemen
2015	Granatowy zeszyt	Witold Lutosławski
2015	Jack Strong	Jan Duszyński
2015	Obce ciało	Wojciech Kilar
2016	Excentrycy, czyli po słonecznej stronie ulicy	Wojciech Karolak
2016	11 minut	Paweł Mykietyn
2016	Fotograf	Maciej Zieliński
2017	Volhynia	Mikołaj Trzaska
2017	Na granicy	Bartłomiej Gliniak
2017	Sługi boże	Maciej Zieliński
2018	Sztuka kochania. Historia Michaliny Wisłockiej	Radzimir Dębski
2018	Człowiek z magicznym pudełkiem	Sandro di Stefano
2018	Droga Aszera	Ishai Adar
2018	Magiczna zima muminków	Łukasz Targosz
2018	Maria Skłodowska-Curie	Bruno Coulais
2018	Loving Vincent	Clint Mansell
2019	Clergy	Mikołaj Trzaska
2019	Fuga	Filip Mišek
2019	Based on a True Story	Alexandre Desplat
2020	Ikar. Legenda Mietka Kosza	Leszek Możdżer
2020	Corpus Christi	Evgueni Galperine
2020	Dziura w głowie	Paweł Szymański
2020	Mowa ptaków	Andrzej Korzyński
2020	Sługi wojny	Maciej Zieliński
2021	Kill It and Leave This Town	Tadeusz Nalepa
2021	Jak najdalej stąd	Hania Rani
2021	The Hater	Michał Jacaszek
2021	Wszystko dla mojej matki	Włodek Pawlik
2021	Charlatan	Mary and Antoni Komasa-Łazarkiewicz
2022	Powrót do tamtych dni	Marcin Masecki
2022	Gierek	Maciej Zieliński
2022	Każdy ma swoje lato	Szymon Wysocki
2022	Magnezja	Jan A.P. Kaczmarek
2022	Mosquito State	Cezary Skubiszewski
2022	Śmierć Zygielbojma	Jan A.P. Kaczmarek
2022	Wesele	Mikołaj Trzaska
2023	EO	Paweł Mykietyn
2023	Bejbis	Marek Napiórkowski
2023	Marzec '68	Bartłomiej Gliniak
2023	The Silent Twins	Marcin Macuk and Zuzanna Wrońska
2023	Szczęścia chodzą parami	Adrian Konarski
2023	Święta inaczej	Maciej Zieliński
2024	The Peasants	L.U.C
2024	Doppelgänger	Jan Komar
2024	Figurant	Zygmunt Konieczny
2024	Kos	Mikołaj Trzaska
2024	Forgotten Love	Paweł Lucewicz
2025	The Girl with the Needle	Frederikke Hoffmeier
2025	Diabeł	Łukasz Targosz
2025	Go Against the Flow	KSU and Eugeniusz Olejarczyk
2025	The Horse Tail	Mikołaj Trzaska
2025	Kulej: All That Glitters Isn't Gold	Jan Komar, Mikołaj Majkusiak and Bartłomiej Tyciński
2025	Simona Kossak	Bartosz Chajdecki
2025	White Courage	Jacek Grudzień
2025	Wróbel	Tomasz Gąssowski
2026	Home Sweet Home	Mikołaj Trzaska
2026	The Altar Boys	Wojtek Urbański
2026	Brother	Antoni Łazarkiewicz
2026	Child of Dust	Joaquin Garcia
2026	Dreams Full of Smoke	Marcin Lenarczyk
2026	Franz	Mary Komasa and Antoni Łazarkiewicz
2026	Mensch	Michał Lorenc
2026	No Ghosts on Good Street	Katarzyna Gawlik and Jerzy Rogiewicz
2026	Operation Pope	Daniel Bloom
