= Polish Academy Award for Best Production Design =

Annual Polish film award

The Polish Academy Award for Best Production Design is an annual award given to the best Polish film production design of the year.

== Winners and nominees ==
| Year | Movie title | Designer(s) |
|---|---|---|
| 1999 | Kroniki domowe | Przemysław Kowalski |
| 1999 | Billboard | Janusz Sosnowski |
| 1999 | Farba | Tadeusz Kosarewicz |
| 1999 | Historia kina w Popielawach | Wojciech Saloni-Marczewski |
| 1999 | Łóżko Wierszynina | Marcin Jarnuszkiewicz |
| 1999 | Nic | Magdalena Kujszczyk |
| 2000 | Pan Tadeusz | Allan Starski |
| 2000 | Dług | Magdalena Dipont |
| 2000 | Fuks | Andrzej Przedworski |
| 2000 | Ogniem i mieczem | Andrzej Haliński |
| 2000 | Wojaczek | Katarzyna Jarnuszkiewicz |
| 2001 | Wrota Europy | Janusz Sosnowski |
| 2001 | Córy szczęścia | Halina Dobrowolska |
| 2001 | Operacja Koza | Andrzej Przedworski |
| 2001 | Prawo ojca | Allan Starski |
| 2001 | Prymas - trzy lata z tysiąca | Barbara Ostapowicz |
| 2001 | Życie jako śmiertelna choroba przenoszona drogą płciową | Halina Dobrowolska |
| 2002 | Quo Vadis | Janusz Sosnowski |
| 2002 | Angelus | Lech Majewski Katarzyna Sobańska |
| 2002 | Egoiści | Bodris F. Kudlicka |
| 2002 | Przedwiośnie | Anna Wunderlich |
| 2002 | Weiser | Andrzej Kowalczyk |
| 2003 | Pianista | Allan Starski |
| 2003 | Chopin. Pragnienie miłości | Andrzej Przedworski |
| 2003 | Edi | Wojciech Żogała |
| 2003 | Tam i z powrotem | Jacek Osadowski |
| 2003 | Zemsta | Magdalena Dipont Tadeusz Kosarewicz |
| 2004 | Pornografia | Andrzej Przedworski |
| 2004 | Stara baśń. Kiedy słońce było bogiem | Andrzej Haliński |
| 2004 | Zmruż oczy | Ewa Jakimowska |
| 2005 | Mój Nikifor | Magdalena Dipont |
| 2005 | Pręgi | Joanna Doroszkiewicz Ewa Skoczkowska |
| 2005 | Wesele | Barbara Ostapowicz |
| 2006 | Komornik | Anna Wunderlich |
| 2006 | Mistrz | Wojciech Żogała |
| 2006 | Persona non grata | Jagna Janicka |
| 2006 | Skazany na bluesa | Joanna Białousz |
| 2006 | The Call of the Toad | Jochen Schumacher Robert Czesak |
| 2007 | Jasminum | Joanna Doroszkiewicz |
| 2007 | Kochankowie z Marony | Jacek Osadowski |
| 2007 | Kto nigdy nie żył... | Janusz Sosnowski |
| 2007 | Wszyscy jesteśmy Chrystusami | Przemysław Kowalski |
| 2008 | Katyń | Magdalena Dipont |
| 2008 | Nightwatching | Maarten Piersma |
| 2008 | Strajk | Robert Czesak |
| 2008 | Wszystko będzie dobrze | Andrzej Kowalczyk |
| 2009 | Mała Moskwa | Tadeusz Kosarewicz |
| 2009 | Cztery noce z Anną | Marek Zawierucha |
| 2009 | Rysa | Jagna Janicka |
| 2010 | Rewers | Magdalena Dipont; Robert Czesak |
| 2010 | Generał Nil | Aniko Kiss |
| 2010 | Miasto z morza | Jacek Osadowski |
| 2010 | Popiełuszko. Wolność jest w nas | Andrzej Kowalczyk |
| 2010 | Wojna polsko-ruska | Joanna Kaczyńska |
| 2011 | Wenecja | Joanna Macha |
| 2011 | Różyczka | Joanna Białousz |
| 2011 | Śluby panieńskie | Anna Wunderlich |
| 2012 | Młyn i krzyż | Katarzyna Sobańska; Marcel Sławiński |
| 2012 | Battle of Warsaw 1920 | Andrzej Haliński |
| 2012 | W ciemności | Marcel Sławiński Erwin Prib Katarzyna Sobańska |
| 2013 | Pokłosie | Allan Starski |
| 2013 | Jesteś Bogiem | Marcel Sławiński Katarzyna Sobańska |
| 2013 | Mój rower | Wojciech Żogała |
| 2013 | Wyspa skazańców | Janusz Sosnowski |
| 2014 | Papusza | Anna Wunderlich |
| 2014 | Dziewczyna z szafy | Andrzej Haliński |
| 2014 | Ida | Marcel Sławiński Katarzyna Sobańska |
| 2014 | Syberiada polska | Michał Sulkiewicz Janusz Sosnowski |
| 2014 | Wałęsa. Człowiek z nadziei | Magdalena Dipont |
| 2015 | Miasto 44 | Marek Warszewski; Grzegorz Piątkowski |
| 2015 | Bogowie | Wojciech Żogała |
| 2015 | Jack Strong | Joanna Macha |
| 2016 | Hiszpanka | Jagna Janicka |
| 2016 | Excentrycy, czyli po słonecznej stronie ulicy | Andrzej Haliński |
| 2016 | Karbala | Marek Warszewski |
| 2017 | Wolyn | Marek Zawierucha |
| 2017 | I'm a Killer | Joanna Anastazja Wójcik |
| 2017 | The Innocents | Joanna Macha |
| 2017 | The Last Family | Jagna Janicka |
| 2018 | Loving Vincent | Matthew Button |
| 2018 | Afterimage | Marek Warszewski |
| 2018 | The Art of Loving | Wojciech Zogala |
| 2018 | The Man with the Magic Box | Wojciech Zogala |
| 2019 | The Butler | Zbigniew Dalecki, Pawel Jarzebski |
| 2019 | Cold War | Katarzyna Sobanska, Marcel Slawinski |
| 2019 | Eter | Joanna Macha |
| 2020 | Mister T. | Magdalena Dipont, Robert Czesak |
| 2020 | Corpus Christi | Marek Zawierucha |
| 2020 | Icarus. The Legend of Mietek Kosz | Joanna Anastazja Wójcik |
| 2020 | Mr. Jones | Grzegorz Piatkowski, Katarzyna Sikora |
| 2020 | The Coldest Game | Allan Starski |
| 2021 | Valley of the Gods | Christopher R. DeMuri, Lech Majewski |
| 2021 | Charlatan | Milan Býcek |
| 2021 | 25 Years of Innocence | Maciej Fajst |
| 2021 | Kill It and Leave this Town | Mariusz Wilczynski |
| 2021 | The Hater | Katarzyna Sobanska, Marcel Slawinski |
| 2022 | Autumn Girl | Wojciech Zogala |
| 2022 | Leave No Traces | Pawel Jarzebski |
| 2022 | Magnesium | Marek Warszewski |
| 2022 | The Champion | Ewa Skoczkowska |
| 2022 | The Musicians | Katarzyna Sobanska, Marcel Slawinski |
| 2022 | Wesele | Marek Warszewski |
| 2023 | Below the Surface | Marcelina Poczatek-Kunikowska |
| 2023 | Chrzciny | Aleksandra Klemens |
| 2023 | Eo | Miroslaw Koncewicz |
| 2023 | March '68 | Ewa Skoczkowska |
| 2023 | Woman on the Roof | Anna Pabisiak |
