= 2006 Polish Film Awards =

The 2006 Polish Film Awards took place on 27 February 2006. It was the 8th edition of Polish Film Awards: Eagles.

== Awards nominees and winners ==
Winners are highlighted in boldface.

=== Best Film ===
- **Komornik – Janusz Morgenstern**
- Jestem – Arthur Reinhart
- Persona non grata – Iwona Ziulkowska

=== Best Actor ===
- **Komornik – Andrzej Chyra**
- Persona non grata – Zbigniew Zapasiewicz
- Skazany na bluesa – Tomasz Kot

=== Best Actress ===
- **Komornik – Kinga Preis**
- Skazany na bluesa – Jolanta Fraszynska
- The Call of the Toad – Krystyna Janda

=== Supporting Actor ===
- **Persona non grata – Jerzy Stuhr**
- The Call of the Toad – Marek Kondrat
- Zakochany aniol – Jerzy Trela

=== Supporting Actress ===
- **Tulipany – Małgorzata Braunek**
- Jestem – Edyta Jungowska
- Skazany na bluesa – Anna Dymna

=== Film Score ===
- **Persona non grata – Wojciech Kilar**
- Jestem – Michael Nyman
- Komornik – Bartlomiej Gliniak
- Skazany na bluesa – Dżem
- Tulipany – Daniel Bloom
- The Call of the Toad – Richard G. Mitchell

=== Director ===
- **Komornik – Feliks Falk**
- Jestem – Dorota Kędzierzawska
- Persona non grata – Krzysztof Zanussi

=== Screenplay ===
- **Komornik – Grzegorz Loszewski**
- Jestem – Dorota Kędzierzawska
- Persona non grata – Krzysztof Zanussi

=== Cinematography ===
- **Jestem – Arthur Reinhart**
- Rozdroze Cafe – Andrzej Ramlau
- Skazany na bluesa – Grzegorz Kuczeriszka
- W dól kolorowym wzgórzem – Jolanta Dylewska

=== Costume Design ===
- **Skazany na bluesa – Ewa Krauze**
- Persona non grata – Jagna Janicka
- Pitbull – Justyna Stolarz

=== Sound ===
- **Persona non grata – Wieslaw Znyk, Jacek Kusmierczyk**
- Mistrz – Jan Freda
- Trzeci – Piotr Domaradzki

=== Editing ===
- **Persona non grata – Wanda Zeman**
- Komornik – Krzysztof Szpetmanski
- Pitbull – Jaroslaw Barzan
- Rozdroze Cafe – Krzysztof Raczynski, Leszek Wosiewicz
- Skazany na bluesa – Cezary Grzesiuk

=== Production Design ===
- **Komornik – Anna Wunderlich**
- Mistrz – Wojciech Zogala
- Persona non grata – Jagna Janicka
- Skazany na bluesa – Joanna Bialousz
- The Call of the Toad – Jochen Schumacher, Robert Czesak

=== European Film ===
- **My Summer of Love – Paweł Pawlikowski** (United Kingdom)
- Knoflíkáři – Petr Zelenka (Czech Republic)
- Kontroll – Nimród Antal (Hungary)

=== Special awards ===
- Audience Award: Komornik
- Life Achievement Award: Jerzy Hoffman
