= 2005 Polish Film Awards =

The 2005 Polish Film Awards ran on March 5, 2005. It was the 7th edition of Polish Film Awards: Eagles.

== Awards nominees and winners ==
Winners are highlighted in boldface.

=== Best Film ===
- **The Wedding – Wojciech Smarzowski**
- Mój Nikifor – Juliusz Machulski
- Pręgi – Wlodzimierz Otulak, Krzysztof Zanussi, Iwona Ziulkowska

=== Best Actor ===
- **The Wedding – Marian Dziedziel**
- Pręgi – Michał Żebrowski
- Ubu król – Jan Peszek

=== Best Actress ===
- **Mój Nikifor – Krystyna Feldman**
- Pręgi – Agnieszka Grochowska
- Ubu król – Katarzyna Figura

=== Supporting Actor ===
- **Pręgi – Jan Frycz**
- Symetria – Borys Szyc
- The Wedding – Arkadiusz Jakubik
- Zerwany – Krzysztof Globisz

=== Supporting Actress ===
- **The Wedding – Iwona Bielska**
- Pręgi – Dorota Kaminska
- Symetria – Kinga Preis

=== Film Score ===
- **The Wedding – Tymon Tymański**
- Mój Nikifor – Bartlomiej Gliniak
- Ono – Pawel Mykietyn
- Pręgi – Adrian Konarski

=== Director ===
- **The Wedding – Wojciech Smarzowski**
- Mój Nikifor – Krzysztof Krauze
- Vinci – Juliusz Machulski

=== Screenplay ===
- **The Wedding – Wojciech Smarzowski**
- Mój Nikifor – Krzysztof Krauze, Joanna Kos
- Pręgi – Wojciech Kuczok
- Vinci – Juliusz Machulski

=== Cinematography ===
- **Mój Nikifor – Krzysztof Ptak**
- Pręgi – Marcin Koszalka
- Symetria – Arkadiusz Tomiak

=== Costume Design ===
- **Ubu król – Magdalena Biedrzycka**
- Mój Nikifor – Dorota Roqueplo
- The Wedding – Magdalena Maciejewska

=== Sound ===
- **Mój Nikifor – Nikodem Wolk-Laniewski**
- Nigdy w zyciu! – Marek Wronko
- Pręgi – Michal Zarnecki

=== Editing ===
- **Mój Nikifor – Krzysztof Szpetmanski**
- Ubu król - Elzbieta Kurkowska
- The Wedding – Pawel Laskowski

=== Production Design ===
- **Mój Nikifor – Magdalena Dipont**
- Pręgi – Joanna Doroszkiewicz, Ewa Skoczkowska
- The Wedding – Barbara Ostapowicz

=== European Film ===
- **Girl with a Pearl Earring – Peter Webber** (United Kingdom/Luxembourg)
- Bad Education – Pedro Almodóvar (Spain)
- The Return – Andrei Zvyagintsev (Russia)

=== Special awards ===
- Audience Award: The Wedding
- Life Achievement Award: Jerzy Kawalerowicz
