= Polish Academy Award for Best Editing =

Polish Film Award

The Polish Academy Award for Best Editing is an annual award given to the best Polish film editing of the year.

== Winners and nominees ==
Year	Movie title	Editor(s)
1999	Historia kina w Popielawach	Ewa Pakulska
1999	Demony wojny wg Goi	Wanda Zeman
1999	Farba	Zbigniew Kostrzewiński
1999	Kochaj i rób co chcesz	Elżbieta Kurkowska
1999	Kroniki domowe	Wanda Zeman]
1999	Nic	Artur Reinhart Dorota Kędzierzawska
1999	U Pana Boga za piecem	Jadwiga Zajiček
1999	Zabić Sekala	Jiří Brožek
1999	Złoto dezerterów	Elżbieta Kurkowska
2000	Pan Tadeusz	Wanda Zeman
2000	Ajlawju	Ewa Smal
2000	Dług	Krzysztof Szpetmański
2000	Kiler-ów 2-óch	Jadwiga Zajiček
2000	Tydzień z życia mężczyzny	Elżbieta Kurkowska
2001	Życie jako śmiertelna choroba przenoszona drogą płciową	Marek Denys
2001	Chłopaki nie płaczą	Wanda Zeman
2001	Duże zwierzę	Elżbieta Kurkowska
2001	Prawo ojca	Wanda Zeman
2001	To ja, złodziej	Jadwiga Zajiček
2002	Weiser	Milenia Fiedler
2002	6 dni strusia	Marek Denys
2002	Cześć, Tereska	Krzysztof Szpetmański
2002	Pieniądze to nie wszystko	Jadwiga Zajiček
2002	Wiedźmin	Wanda Zeman
2003	Pianista	Hervé de Luze
2003	Dzień świra	Ewa Smal
2003	Edi	Cezary Kowalczuk
2003	Tam i z powrotem	Marek Denys
2003	Zemsta	Wanda Zeman
2004	Żurek	Jarosław Kamiński
2004	Pogoda na jutro	Elżbieta Kurkowska
2004	Stara baśń. Kiedy słońce było bogiem	Cezary Grzesiuk
2005	Mój Nikifor	Krzysztof Szpetmański
2005	Ubu król	Elżbieta Kurkowska
2005	Wesele	Paweł Laskowkski
2006	Persona non grata	Wanda Zeman
2006	Komornik	Krzysztof Szpetmański
2006	PitBull	Jarosław Barzan
2006	Rozdroże cafe	Leszek Wosiewicz Krzysztof Raczyński
2006	Skazany na bluesa	Cezary Grzesiuk
2007	We're All Christs	Ewa Smal
2007	Kochankowie z Marony	Anna Wagner
2007	Plac Zbawiciela	Krzysztof Szpetmański
2008	Parę osób, mały czas	Wanda Zeman
2008	Katyń	Milenia Fiedler Rafał Listopad
2008	Korowód	Elżbieta Kurkowska
2008	Pora umierać	Artur Reinhart Dorota Kędzierzawska
2008	Świadek koronny	Piotr Kmiecik
2008	Wszystko będzie dobrze	Krzysztof Szpetmański
2009	33 sceny z życia	Jacek Drosio
2009	Lejdis	Jarosław Barzan
2009	Ogród Luizy	Ewa Smal
2009	Rysa	Krzysztof Szpetmański
2009	Serce na dłoni	Wanda Zeman
2010	Dom zły	Paweł Laskowski
2010	Jeszcze nie jeden wieczór	Jarosław Kamiński Jacek Bławut
2010	Mniejsze zło	Elżbieta Kurkowska
2011	Essential Killing	Réka Lenhényi; Maciej Pawliński
2011	Chrzest	Piotr Kmiecik
2011	Las	Katarzyna Maciejko-Kowalczyk Beata Walentowska
2011	Różyczka	Cezary Grzesiuk
2011	Wenecja	Witold Chomiński
2012	Sala samobójców	Bartosz Pietras
2012	Battle of Warsaw 1920	Marcin "Kot" Bastkowski
2012	Czarny Czwartek. Janek Wiśniewski padł	Rafał Listopad
2012	Ki	Jarosław Kamiński
2012	W imieniu diabła	Anna Wagner
2013	Jesteś Bogiem	Jarosław Kamiński
2013	Mój rower	Cezary Kowalczuk
2013	Pokłosie	Jarosław Kamiński
2014	Ida	Jarosław Kamiński
2014	Chce się żyć	Krzysztof Szpetmański
2014	Imagine	Cezary Grzesiuk
2014	Wałęsa. Człowiek z nadziei	Milenia Fiedler Grażyna Gradoń
2015	Miasto 44	Michał Czarnecki
2015	Bogowie	Jarosław Barzan
2015	Jack Strong	Jarosław Kamiński
2015	Jeziorak	Agnieszka Glińska
2016	11 minut	Agnieszka Glińska
2016	Karbala	Michał Czarnecki
2016	Moje córki krowy	Bartosz Karczyński
2017	Volhynia	Paweł Laskowski
2017	I'm a Killer	Leszek Starzyński
2017	Komunia	Agnieszka Glińska, Anna Zamecka, Wojciech Janas
2017	All These Sleepless Nights	Dorota Wardęszkiewicz
2017	United States of Love	Beata Liszewska
