= Polish Academy Award for Best Producer =

Annual film award

The Polish Academy Award for Best Producer was an annual award (1999–2001) given to the best Polish film producer of the year.

== Winners and nominees ==
| Year | Producer(s) | Movie title |
|---|---|---|
| 1999 | Dariusz Jabłoński | Zabić Sekala |
| 1999 | Filip Bajon | Farba |
| 1999 | Kazimierz Rozwałka | Historia kina w Popielawach |
| 1999 | Michał Kwieciński | Kroniki domowe |
| 1999 | Artur Reinhart Dorota Kędzierzawska | Nic |
| 1999 | Tadeusz Chmielewski | U Pana Boga z piecem |
| 1999 | Iga Cembrzyńska | Złote runo |
| 2000 | Jerzy Michaluk Jerzy Hoffman | Ogniem i mieczem |
| 2000 | Juliusz Machulski | Dług |
| 2000 | Lew Rywin | Pan Tadeusz |
| 2000 | Juliusz Machulski | Tydzień z życia mężczyzny |
| 2000 | Henryk Romanowski | Wojaczek |
| 2001 | Krzysztof Zanussi Iwona Ziułkowska | Życie jako śmiertelna choroba przenoszona drogą płciową |
| 2001 | Paweł Mossakowski Janusz Morgenstern | Chłopaki nie płaczą |
| 2001 | Witold Adamek | Daleko od okna |
| 2001 | Sławomir Rogowski Janusz Morgenstern | Duże zwierzę |
| 2001 | Marian Terlecki | Prymas - trzy lata z tysiąca |
