= 2001 Polish Film Awards =

The 2001 Polish Film Awards was the 3rd edition of Polish Film Awards: Eagles.

== Awards winners ==
Category	Film	Winner(s)
Best Film	Życie jako śmiertelna choroba przenoszona droga płciową	Iwona Ziułkowska
Best Actor	Życie jako śmiertelna choroba przenoszona droga płciową	Zbigniew Zapasiewicz
Best Actress	Daleko od okna	Dominika Ostałowska
Supporting Actor	To ja, złodziej	Janusz Gajos
Supporting Actress	To ja, złodziej	Krystyna Feldman
Film Score	Życie jako śmiertelna choroba przenoszona droga płciową	Wojciech Kilar
Director	Życie jako śmiertelna choroba przenoszona droga płciową	Krzysztof Zanussi
Screenplay	Życie jako śmiertelna choroba przenoszona droga płciową	Krzysztof Zanussi
Cinematography	Wrota Europy	Witold Sobociński
Sound	Prymas. Trzy lata z tysiąca	Nikodem Wołk-Łaniewski
Editing	Życie jako śmiertelna choroba przenoszona droga płciową	Marek Denys
Producer	Życie jako śmiertelna choroba przenoszona droga płciową	Krzysztof Zanussi, Iwona Ziułkowska
Production Design	Wrota Europy	Janusz Sosnowski
Costume Design	Wrota Europy	Magdalena Tesławska, Paweł Grabarczyk

=== Special awards ===
- Life Achievement Award: Stanisław Różewicz
- Special Award: Roman Polanski, Stanisław Pacuk
