= 2000 Polish Film Awards =

The 2000 Polish Film Awards was the 2nd edition of Polish Film Awards: Eagles.

== Awards winners ==
Category	Film	Winner(s)
Best Film	Dług	Juliusz Machulski
Best Actor	Dług	Robert Gonera
Best Actress	Pan Tadeusz	Grażyna Szapołowska
Supporting Actor	Dług	Andrzej Chyra
Supporting Actress	With Fire and Sword	Ewa Wiśniewska
Film Score	Pan Tadeusz	Wojciech Kilar
Director	Dług	Krzysztof Krauze
Screenplay	Dług	Krzysztof Krauze, Jerzy Morawski
Cinematography	Pan Tadeusz	Paweł Edelman
Sound	Pan Tadeusz	Nikodem Wołk-Łaniewski
Editing	Pan Tadeusz	Wanda Zeman
Producer	With Fire and Sword	Jerzy Hoffman, Jerzy Michaluk, Jerzy Morawski
Production Design	Pan Tadeusz	Allan Starski

=== Special awards ===
- Life Achievement Award: Andrzej Wajda
