= Home Sweet Home (2025 Polish film) =

2025 film by Wojciech Smarzowski

- Theatrical release poster
- Polish: Dom dobry
- Directed by: Wojciech Smarzowski
- Written by: Wojciech Smarzowski
- Produced by: Wojciech Gostomczyk; Janusz Hetman
- Starring: Agata Turkot; Tomasz Schuchardt
- Cinematography: Paweł Tybora
- Edited by: Krzysztof Komander
- Music by: Mikołaj Trzaska
- Production company: Lucky Bob
- Release dates: 23 September 2025 (Polish Film Festival); 7 November 2025 (Poland)
- Running time: 108 minutes
- Country: Poland
- Language: Polish

Home Sweet Home (Polish: Dom dobry) is a 2025 Polish drama film written and directed by Wojciech Smarzowski. It stars Agata Turkot and Tomasz Schuchardt.

The film had its world premiere at the Polish Film Festival on 22 September 2025. It was theatrically released in Poland on 7 November 2025. It won the Polish Academy Award for Best Film along with four other awards at the 38th ceremony.

== Premise ==
A couple who meet on an online dating platform marry, but their relationship later deteriorates into a troubling situation.

== Cast ==
- Agata Turkot as Gośka Nowak
- Tomasz Schuchardt as Grzesiek Nowak, Gośka's husband
- Agata Kulesza as Jolka, Gośka's mother
- Maria Sobocińska as Magda, Gośka's sister
- Łukasz Gawroński as Edek, Magda's husband
- Arkadiusz Jakubik as Father Bogdan
- Andrzej Konopka as Zibi

== Production ==
In February 2024, it was reported that Smarzowski was shooting a drama film about domestic violence, with Agata Kulesza, Tomasz Schuchardt, and Agata Turkot attached to star. Principal photography took place in Warsaw, Serock, and Pruszków.

== Release ==
Home Sweet Home had its world premiere at the 50th Polish Film Festival on 23 September 2025, competing for the Golden Lion. It was theatrically released in Poland on 7 November 2025 by Warner Bros. Entertainment. It was the highest grossing Polish film of 2025 and it garnered more than 2,377,000 admissions during its theatrical run.

== Accolades ==
Award / Film Festival	Date of ceremony	Category	Recipient(s)	Result	Ref.
Polish Film Festival	27 September 2025	Golden Lion	Wojciech Smarzowski	Nominated	
Polish Film Festival	27 September 2025	Film Discussion Clubs Award	Wojciech Smarzowski	Won	
Warsaw Film Festival	19 October 2025	Special Jury Award	Agata Turkot and Tomasz Schuchardt	Won	
Polish Film Award	9 March 2026	Best Film	Wojciech Smarzowski	Won	
Polish Film Award	9 March 2026	Best Director	Wojciech Smarzowski	Won	
Polish Film Award	9 March 2026	Best Actor	Tomasz Schuchardt	Won	
Polish Film Award	9 March 2026	Best Actress	Agata Turkot	Won	
Polish Film Award	9 March 2026	Best Supporting Actor	Andrzej Konopka	Nominated	
Polish Film Award	9 March 2026	Best Supporting Actress	Agata Kulesza	Nominated	
Polish Film Award	9 March 2026	Best Supporting Actress	Maria Sobocińska	Nominated	
Polish Film Award	9 March 2026	Best Screenplay	Wojciech Smarzowski	Nominated	
Polish Film Award	9 March 2026	Best Production Design	Joanna Macha	Nominated	
Polish Film Award	9 March 2026	Best Makeup and Hairstyling	Liliana Gałązka	Nominated	
Polish Film Award	9 March 2026	Best Film Score	Mikołaj Trzaska	Won	
Polish Film Award	9 March 2026	Best Sound	Radosław Ochnio and Marta Weronika Werońska	Nominated	
Polish Film Award	9 March 2026	Best Editing	Krzysztof Komander	Nominated	
