= 2007 Polish Film Awards =

The 2007 Polish Film Awards ran on March 5, 2007 at Teatr Narodowy. It was the 9th edition of Polish Film Awards: Eagles. The ceremony was hosted by Zbigniew Zamachowski and Wojciech Malajkat.

Nominations for the awards were announced on January 29, 2007. As many as 29 films competed for the award nominations.

== Awards nominees and winners ==
Winners are highlighted in boldface.

=== Best Film ===
- **Plac Zbawiciela – Krzysztof Krauze, Joanna Kos-Krauze**
- Jasminum – Jan Jakub Kolski
- Wszyscy jesteśmy Chrystusami – Marek Koterski

=== Best Actor ===
- **Jasminum – Janusz Gajos**
- Po sezonie – Leon Niemczyk
- Wszyscy jesteśmy Chrystusami – Marek Kondrat

=== Best Actress ===
- **Plac Zbawiciela – Jowita Budnik**
- Kochankowie z Marony – Karolina Gruszka
- Statyści – Kinga Preis

=== Supporting Actor ===
- **Statyści – Krzysztof Kiersznowski**
- Jasminum – Adam Ferency
- Wszyscy jesteśmy Chrystusami – Andrzej Chyra

=== Supporting Actress ===
- **Plac Zbawiciela – Ewa Wencel**
- Co słonko widziało – Jadwiga Jankowska-Cieślak
- Statyści – Anna Romantowska

=== Film Score ===
- **Jasminum – Zygmunt Konieczny**
- Palimpsest – Bartłomiej Gliniak
- Plac Zbawiciela – Paweł Szymański

=== Director ===
- **Plac Zbawiciela – Krzysztof Krauze, Joanna Kos-Krauze**
- Jasminum – Jan Jakub Kolski
- Wszyscy jesteśmy Chrystusami – Marek Koterski

=== Screenplay ===
- **Wszyscy jesteśmy Chrystusami – Marek Koterski**
- Statyści – Jarosław Sokół
- Plac Zbawiciela – Joanna Kos-Krauze, Krzysztof Krauze, Jowita Budnik, Arkadiusz Janiczek, Ewa Wencel

=== Cinematography ===
- **Jasminum – Krzysztof Ptak**
- Palimpsest – Arkadiusz Tomiak
- Wszyscy jesteśmy Chrystusami – Edward Kłosiński

=== Costume Design ===
- **Jasminum – Ewa Helman**
- Kochankowie Roku Tygrysa – Andrzej Szenajch
- Kochankowie z Marony – Magdalena Biedrzycka
- Oda do radości – Magdalena Biedrzycka
- Samotność w Sieci – Ewa Machulska
- Statyści – Paweł Grabarczyk
- Tylko mnie kochaj – Elżbieta Radke
- Wszyscy jesteśmy Chrystusami – Magdalena Biedrzycka, Justyna Stolarz

=== Sound ===
- **Jasminum – Jacek Hamela**
- Pope John Paul II – Maurizio Argentirei, Marek Wronko
- Kochankowie z Marony – Nikodem Wołk-Łaniewski
- Plac Zbawiciela – Nikodem Wołk-Łaniewski
- Statyści – Andrzej Bohdanowicz

=== Editing ===
- **Wszyscy jesteśmy Chrystusami – Ewa Smal**
- Kochankowie z Marony – Anna Wagner
- Plac Zbawiciela – Krzysztof Szpetmański

=== Production Design ===
- **Jasminum – Joanna Doroszkiewicz**
- Kochankowie z Marony – Jacek Osadowski
- Kto nigdy nie żył... – Janusz Sosnowski
- Wszyscy jesteśmy Chrystusami – Przemysław Kowalski

=== European Film ===
- **Volver – Pedro Almodóvar** (Spain)
- Copying Beethoven – Agnieszka Holland (Germany)
- The Wind That Shakes the Barley – Ken Loach (Republic of Ireland)

=== Special awards ===
- Audience Award: Jasminum
- Life Achievement Award: Witold Sobociński
