= Polish Academy Award for Best Sound =

Annual Polish film award

The Polish Academy Award for Best Sound is an annual award given to the best Polish sound-on-film of the year.

== Winners and nominees ==
Year	Winner	Movie title
1999	Lech Brański	Kochaj i rób co chcesz
1999	Marek Wronko Paweł Łuczyc-Wychowski	Ciemna strona Wenus
1999	Andrzej Żabicki	Historia kina w Popielawach
1999	Barbara Domradzka	Nic
1999	Katarzyna Dzida-Hamela	U Pana Boga za piecem
1999	Wiesław Znyk	Złoto dezerterów
2000	Nikodem Wołk-Łaniewski	Pan Tadeusz
2000	Barbara Domaradzka	Fuks
2000	Marek Wronko	Kiler-ów 2-óch
2000	Krzysztof Wodziński Piotr Knop	Ogniem i mieczem
2000	Marek Wronko Katarzyna Dzida-Hamela	Tydzień z życia mężczyzny
2001	Nikodem Wołk-Łaniewski	Prymas. Trzy lata z tysiąca
2001	Aleksander Gołębiowski	Córy szczęścia
2001	Aleksander Gołębiowski	Nie ma zmiłuj
2001	Piotr Domaradzki	Ostatnia misja
2001	Janusz Rosół	Syzyfowe prace
2002	Francois Musy Joanna Napieralska Mariusz Kuczyński Marek Wronko	Weiser
2002	Lech Brański	Cześć, Tereska
2002	Katarzyna Dzida-Hamela	Poranek kojota
2002	Jacek Hamela Andrzej Lewandowski Błażej Kukla Andrzej Bohdanowicz Ryszard Krupa	Pół serio
2002	Piotr Knop	Quo Vadis
2003	Jean-Marie Blondel	Pianista
2003	Nikodem Wołk-Łaniewski	Chopin. Pragnienie miłości
2003	Jan Freda	Edi
2003	Andrzej Artymowicz Marek Wronko	Haker
2003	Piotr Domaradzki	Tam i z powrotem
2004	Jacek Hamela Bertrand Come Katarzyna Dzida-Hamela	Pornografia
2004	Marek Wronko	Superprodukcja
2004	Nikodem Wołk-Łaniewski	Pogoda na jutro
2005	Nikodem Wołk-Łaniewski	Mój Nikifor
2005	Marek Wronko	Nigdy w życiu!
2005	Michał Żarnecki	Pręgi
2006	Wiesław Znyk Jacek Kuśmierczyk	Persona non grata
2006	Jan Freda	Mistrz
2006	Piotr Domaradzki	Trzeci
2007	Jacek Hamela	Jasminum
2007	Marek Wronko Maurizio Argentieri	Jan Paweł II
2007	Nikodem Wołk-Łaniewski	Kochankowie z Marony
2007	Nikodem Wołk-Łaniewski	Plac Zbawiciela
2007	Michał Muzyka Andrzej Bohdanowicz	Statyści
2008	Jacek Hamela	Katyń
2008	Michał Żarnecki	Północ-Południe
2008	Jan Freda	U Pana Boga w ogródku
2009	Wacław Pilkowski; Michał Kosterkiewicz; Piotr Knop	Mała Moskwa
2009	Gérard Rousseau Frédéric de Ravignan Philippe Lauliac	Cztery noce z Anną
2009	Marek Wronko	Ile waży koń trojański?
2010	Mateusz Adamczyk Sebastian Witkowski	Wojna polsko-ruska
2010	Jacek Hamela Krzysztof Jastrząb	Afonia i pszczoły
2010	Krzysztof Jastrząb	Janosik. Prawdziwa historia
2011	Jacek Hamela	Wenecja
2011	Nikodem Wołk-Łaniewski Grzegorz Lindemann	Fenomen
2011	Joanna Napieralska Wiesław Znyk	Różyczka
2012	Jacek Hamela; Katarzyna Dzida-Hamela	Róża
2012	Krzysztof Jastrząb	Mała matura 1947
2012	Bartosz Putkiewicz	Sala samobójców
2013	Barbara Domaradzka; Piotr Domaradzki	Obława
2013	Nikodem Wołk-Łaniewski	Felix, Net i Nika oraz teoretycznie możliwa katastrofa
2013	Michał Żarnecki	Piąta pora roku
2013	Jan Schremer Bartosz Putkiewicz Jan Freda	Pokłosie
2014	Guillaume Le Bras; Jacek Hamela	Imagine
2014	Marek Wronko	Ambassada
2014	Michał Żarnecki	Syberiada polska
2015	Bartosz Putkiewicz	Powstanie Warszawskie
2015	Michał Fojcik Bartłomiej Bogacki	Bogowie
2015	Jan Freda Kacper Habisiak Marcin Kasiński	Jack Strong
2016	Krzysztof Jastrząb Mateusz Irisik	Excentrycy, czyli po słonecznej stronie ulicy
2016	Kacper Habisiak Marcin Kasiński Marcin Jachyra	Body/Ciało
2016	Marcin Lenarczyk Maria Chilarecka	Córki dancingu
2016	Marek Wronko	Panie Dulskie
