= 2002 Polish Film Awards =

The 2002 Polish Film Awards ran on March 9, 2002, at Royal Palace, Warsaw. It was the 4th edition of Polish Film Awards: Eagles.

== Awards winners ==
Category	Film	Winner(s)
Best Film	Cześć Tereska	Filip Chodzewicz
Best Actor	Cześć Tereska	Zbigniew Zamachowski
Best Actress	Cisza	Kinga Preis
Supporting Actor	Quo vadis	Jerzy Trela
Supporting Actress	Pieniądze to nie wszystko	Stanisława Celińska
Film Score	Wiedźmin	Grzegorz Ciechowski
Director	Cześć Tereska	Robert Gliński
Screenplay	Cześć Tereska	Jacek Wyszomirski
Cinematography	Weiser	Krzysztof Ptak
Sound	Weiser	Francois Musy, Joanna Napieralska, Mariusz Kuczyński, Marek Wronko
Editing	Weiser	Milenia Fiedler
Production Design	Quo vadis	Janusz Sosnowski
Costume Design	Quo vadis	Magdalena Tesławska, Paweł Grabarczyk

=== Special awards ===
- Life Achievement Award: Tadeusz Konwicki
- Special Award: Agnieszka Holland, Sławomir Idziak
- Audience Award: Cześć Tereska
