= 2003 Polish Film Awards =

The 2003 Polish Film Awards ran on March 15, 2003. It was the 5th edition of Polish Film Awards: Eagles.

== Awards nominees and winners ==
Winners are highlighted in boldface.

=== Best Film ===
- **The Pianist – Roman Polanski, Robert Benmussa, Alain Sarde**
- Anioł w Krakowie – Witold Beres
- Dzień świra – Juliusz Machulski, Włodzimierz Otulak
- Edi – Piotr Dzięcioł

=== Best Actor ===
- **Dzień świra – Marek Kondrat**
- Edi – Henryk Golebiewski
- The Pianist – Adrien Brody
- Tam i z powrotem – Janusz Gajos
- Zemsta – Janusz Gajos

=== Best Actress ===
- **Chopin. Pragnienie miłości – Danuta Stenka**
- Anioł w Krakowie – Ewa Kaim
- The Pianist – Emilia Fox
- Zemsta – Katarzyna Figura

=== Supporting Actor ===
- **Edi – Jacek Braciak**
- Anioł w Krakowie – Jerzy Trela
- The Pianist – Ed Stoppard
- Zemsta – Daniel Olbrychski

=== Supporting Actress ===
- **Wtorek – Kinga Preis**
- Anioł w Krakowie – Beata Schimscheiner
- Dzień świra – Janina Traczykówna
- The Pianist – Maureen Lipman
- Zemsta – Agata Buzek

=== Film Score ===
- **The Pianist – Wojciech Kilar**
- Dzień świra – Jerzy Satanowski
- Edi – Wojciech Lemanski
- Zemsta – Wojciech Kilar

=== Director ===
- **The Pianist – Roman Polanski**
- Dzień świra – Marek Koterski
- Edi – Piotr Trzaskalski
- Zemsta – Andrzej Wajda

=== Screenplay ===
- **Dzień świra – Marek Koterski**
- Edi – Wojciech Lepianka, Piotr Trzaskalski
- The Pianist – Ronald Harwood

=== Cinematography ===
- **The Pianist – Paweł Edelman**
- Edi – Krzysztof Ptak

=== Costume Design ===
- **The Pianist – Anna B. Sheppard**
- Chopin. Pragnienie miłości – Magdalena Biernawska-Teslawska, Paweł Grabarczyk
- Dzień świra – Ewa Krauze
- The Revenge – Krystyna Zachwatowicz, Magdalena Biedrzycka
- Kariera Nikosia Dyzmy – Małgorzata Braszka

=== Sound ===
- **The Pianist – Jean-Marie Blondel**
- Chopin. Pragnienie miłości – Nikodem Wolk-Laniewski
- Edi – Jan Freda

=== Editing ===
- **The Pianist – Hervé de Luze**
- Dzień świra – Ewa Smal
- Edi – Cezary Kowalczuk
- Zemsta – Wanda Zeman

=== Production Design ===
- **The Pianist – Allan Starski**
- Chopin. Pragnienie miłości – Andrzej Przedworski
- Edi – Wojciech Zogala

=== Special awards ===
- Life Achievement Award: Roman Polanski
- Special Award: Jeremy Thomas, Jerzy Skolimowski
- Audience Award: Edi
