= Doppelgänger (2023 film) =

2023 Polish film by Jan Holoubek

- Polish theatrical release poster
- Polish: Doppelgänger. Sobowtór
- Directed by: Jan Holoubek
- Written by: Andrzej Golda; Jan Holoubek
- Produced by: Anna Waśniewska-Gill
- Starring: Jakub Gierszał; Tomasz Schuchardt
- Cinematography: Bartłomiej Kaczmarek
- Edited by: Rafał Listopad
- Music by: Jan Komar
- Production company: TVN
- Distributed by: Next Film
- Release dates: September 18, 2023 (Gdynia); September 29, 2023 (Poland)
- Running time: 120 minutes
- Country: Poland
- Languages: Polish; German; French

Doppelgänger (also known as Doppelgänger. The Double; Polish: Doppelgänger. Sobowtór) is a 2023 Polish drama film directed by Jan Holoubek. It premiered at the Polish Film Festival on 18 September 2023 and was released theatrically in Poland on 29 September 2023.

== Premise ==
The film centers on the lives of two men living on opposite sides of the Iron Curtain of the Cold War in the 1970s. Jan Bitner is a Pole from Gdańsk who participates in the fight for a free Poland, while Hans Steiner lives a quiet life in Strasbourg. Although they lead seemingly different lives, there is one detail that links them.

== Cast ==
- Jakub Gierszał as Józef Wieczorek/Hans Steiner
- Tomasz Schuchardt as Jan Bitner
- Emily Kusche as Nina Steiner
- Wiktoria Gorodeckaja as Olga Bitner, Jan's wife
- Joachim Raaf as Helmut Steiner, Nina's father
- Andrzej Seweryn as Roman Wieczorek, Józef's father
- Katarzyna Herman as the lead officer
- Jessica McIntyre as Marie Steiner, Nina's mother
- Nathalie Richard as Helga Steiner, Hans's mother
- Maximilien Seweryn as Pierre
- Sławomira Łozińska as Elżbieta Wieczorek, Józef's mother
- Krzysztof Dracz as the colonel
- Pierre Azema as Alfred Marne

== Production ==
The film was shot in Gdańsk.

== Accolades ==
Year	Award	Category	Nominee	Result	Ref.
2023	Polish Film Festival	Best Film	Doppelgänger	Nominated	
2023	Polish Film Festival	Best Director	Jan Holoubek	Won	
2023	Polish Film Festival	Best Supporting Actor	Tomasz Schuchardt	Won	
2023	Polish Film Festival	Best Cinematography	Bartłomiej Kaczmarek	Won	
2023	Polish Film Festival	Best Production Design	Marek Warszewski	Won	
2023	Polish Film Festival	Best Costume Design	Weronika Orlińska	Won	
2023	Polish Film Festival	Radio Gdańsk Award for Sound Effects	Kacper Habisiak, Marcin Kasiński, Przemysław Kamieński, & Filip Krzemień	Won	
2024	Polish Film Awards	Best Film	Doppelgänger	Nominated	
2024	Polish Film Awards	Best Director	Jan Holoubek	Nominated	
2024	Polish Film Awards	Best Screenplay	Jan Holoubek	Nominated	
2024	Polish Film Awards	Best Actor	Jakub Gierszal	Nominated	
2024	Polish Film Awards	Best Supporting Actor	Tomasz Schuchardt	Won	
2024	Polish Film Awards	Best Supporting Actress	Katarzyna Herman	Nominated	
2024	Polish Film Awards	Best Cinematography	Bartłomiej Kaczmarek	Nominated	
2024	Polish Film Awards	Best Film Score	Jan Komar	Nominated	
2024	Polish Film Awards	Best Editing	Rafał Listopad	Nominated	
2024	Polish Film Awards	Best Production Design	Marek Warszewski	Nominated	
2024	Polish Film Awards	Best Costume Design	Weronika Orlińska	Nominated	
2024	Polish Film Awards	Best Makeup	Mirela Zawiszewska & Justyna Osińska	Nominated	
2024	Polish Film Awards	Best Sound	Kacper Habisiak, Marcin Kasiński, & Przemysław Kamieński	Nominated	
