= 1999 Polish Film Awards =

The 1999 Polish Film Awards was the 1st edition of Polish Film Awards: Eagles.

== Awards winners ==
Category	Film	Winner(s)
Best Film	Historia kina w Popielawach	Jan Jakub Kolski, Kazimierz Rozwałka
Best Actor	Sekal Has to Die	Olaf Lubaszenko
Best Actress	Farba	Agnieszka Krukówna
Film Score	Historia kina w Popielawach	Zygmunt Konieczny
Director	Nic	Dorota Kędzierzawska
Screenplay	Sekal Has to Die	Jiri Krizan
Cinematography	Historia kina w Popielawach	Krzysztof Ptak
Sound	Kochaj i rób co chcesz	Lech Brański
Editing	Historia kina w Popielawach	Ewa Pakulska
Producer	Sekal Has to Die	Dariusz Jabłoński
Production Design	Kroniki domowe	Przemysław Kowalski

=== Special awards ===
- Life Achievement Award: Wojciech Has
