= The Gateway of Europe =

- Directed by: Jerzy Wójcik
- Written by: Andrzej Mularczyk; Melchior Wańkowicz; Jerzy Wójcik
- Produced by: Dariusz Jabłoński; Henryk Romanowski
- Starring: Alicja Bachleda-Curuś; Kinga Preis
- Cinematography: Witold Sobociński
- Edited by: Milenia Fiedler
- Music by: Zygmunt Konieczny
- Release date: 11 November 1999
- Running time: 73 minutes
- Country: Poland
- Language: Polish

The Gateway of Europe (Polish: Wrota Europy) is a Polish historical film. It was released in 1999. In 2001, it received Polish Film Awards for Best Cinematography, Best Costume Design and Best Production Design.

== Plot ==
In January 1918, three volunteer nurses came to the field hospital and Polish Corps located in the manor in Ciechinicze (Cichinicze) between Rahačoŭ and Babrujsk. Sophie, one of the nurses, finds her previously missing brother. When the hospital gets into the hands of the Bolsheviks, the sisters must cope not only with patient care, but also the brutality of the enemy soldiers.

== Cast ==
- Alicja Bachleda-Curuś as Zosia
- Kinga Preis as Hala
- Henryk Boukołowski as Dr Mroczek
- Agata Buzek as Henrietta
- Piotr Szwedes as Smagły
- Małgorzata Rudzka as Lasiewska
- Agnieszka Sitek − Ira
- Mariusz Bonaszewski − dr Lesiewski
- Piotr Szwedes − Smagły
- Piotr Adamczyk − Sztyller
- Katarzyna Groniec − Niewidoma
- Magda Teresa Wójcik − Kobieta
- Jan Kozaczuk − Staszewicz
- Piotr Rzymyszkiewicz − kolega Staszewicza
- Andriej Jegorow − Andriej Anczew
- Aleksander Kalinowski − Rudy
- Michał Breitenwald − Żyd
- Jerzy Mularczyk − ranny
