= 2004 Polish Film Awards =

The 2004 Polish Film Awards ran on March 6, 2004 in Warsaw. It was the 6th edition of Polish Film Awards: Eagles.

== Awards nominees and winners ==
Winners are highlighted in boldface.

=== Best Film ===
- **Zmruż oczy – Arkadiusz Artemjew, Tomasz Gassowski, Andrzej Jakimowski**
- Pornografia – Antoine de Clermont-Tonnerre, Lew Rywin
- Żurek

=== Best Actor ===
- **Zmruż oczy – Zbigniew Zamachowski**
- Pogoda na jutro – Jerzy Stuhr
- Pornografia – Krzysztof Majchrzak

=== Best Actress ===
- **Żurek – Katarzyna Figura**
- Przemiany – Maja Ostaszewska
- Zmruż oczy – Ola Prószyńska

=== Supporting Actor ===
- **Pornografia – Jan Frycz**
- Warszawa – Sławomir Orzechowski
- Żurek – Zbigniew Zamachowski

=== Supporting Actress ===
- **Warszawa – Dominika Ostalowska**
- Zmruż oczy – Małgorzata Foremniak
- Żurek – Natalia Rybicka

=== Film Score ===
- **Pornografia – Zygmunt Konieczny**
- Nienasycenie – Leszek Możdżer
- An Ancient Tale: When the Sun Was a God – Krzesimir Dębski

=== Director ===
- **Zmruż oczy – Andrzej Jakimowski**
- Julie Walking Home – Agnieszka Holland
- Pornografia – Jan Jakub Kolski
- Warszawa – Dariusz Gajewski

=== Screenplay ===
- **Zmruż oczy – Andrzej Jakimowski**
- Warszawa – Dariusz Gajewski, Mateusz Bednarkiewicz
- Żurek – Ryszard Brylski

=== Cinematography ===
- **Pornografia – Krzysztof Ptak**
- Julie Walking Home – Jacek Petrycki
- Zmruż oczy – Adam Bajerski, Pawel Smietanka

=== Costume Design ===
- **An Ancient Tale: When the Sun Was a God – Magdalena Biernawska-Teslawska, Pawel Grabarczyk**
- Nienasycenie – Daiva Petrulyte
- Pornografia – Małgorzata Zacharska

=== Sound ===
- **Pornografia – Jacek Hamela, Bertrand Come, Katarzyna Dzida**
- Pogoda na jutro – Nikodem Wolk-Laniewski
- Superprodukcja – Marek Wronko

=== Editing ===
- **Żurek – Jarosław Kamiński**
- Pogoda na jutro – Elzbieta Kurkowska
- An Ancient Tale: When the Sun Was a God – Cezary Grzesiuk

=== Production Design ===
- **Pornografia – Andrzej Przedworski**
- An Ancient Tale: When the Sun Was a God – Andrzej Halinski
- Zmruż oczy – Ewa Jakimowska

=== Special awards ===
- Life Achievement Award: Kazimierz Kutz
