= Jagna (given name) =

Jagna is a Polish feminine given name. Notable people with the name include:

- Jagna Janicka (born 1959), Polish film and stage costume and scene designer
- Jagna Marczułajtis (born 1978), Polish politician and former snowboarder

== See also ==
- Jagna, a municipality in Bohol, Philippines
