= Sweet Rush =

Sweet Rush may refer to:

- Sweet rush, one of several names (beewort, calamus root, myrtle grass) for Acorus calamus
- Sweet Rush, English title for Polish director Andrzej Wajda's Tatarak
