= Polish Academy Special Award =

Polish film award

The Polish Academy Special Award was a special honor presented annually from 2001 to 2003 as part of the Polish Film Awards.

== Winners ==
- 2001: Roman Polanski, Stanisław Pacuk
- 2002: Agnieszka Holland, Sławomir Idziak
- 2003: Jeremy Thomas, Jerzy Skolimowski
