= Leszek Konieczny =

Polish biochemist (born 1933)

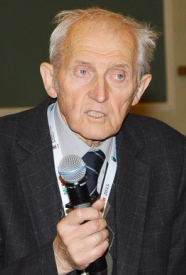
Leszek Konieczny in a conference in 2010.

Leszek Konieczny (Polish pronunciation: [ˈlɛ.ʂɛk kɔˈɲɛt͡ʂ.nɨ]; born 9 August 1933) is a Polish biochemist who has been professor at the Jagiellonian University Medical College since 1995.

Leszek Konieczny is the author of numerous scientific papers in the field of protein structure and function and immunochemistry.

He is brother of Zygmunt Konieczny.

== Works ==
- Konieczny, Leszek (c. 2013). Systems biology: functional strategies of living organisms. Irena Roterman-Konieczna, Paweł Spólnik, Piotr Nowakowski. New York. ISBN 978-3-319-01336-7. OCLC 861687747.
