= Polish Academy Life Achievement Award =

Annual Polish film award

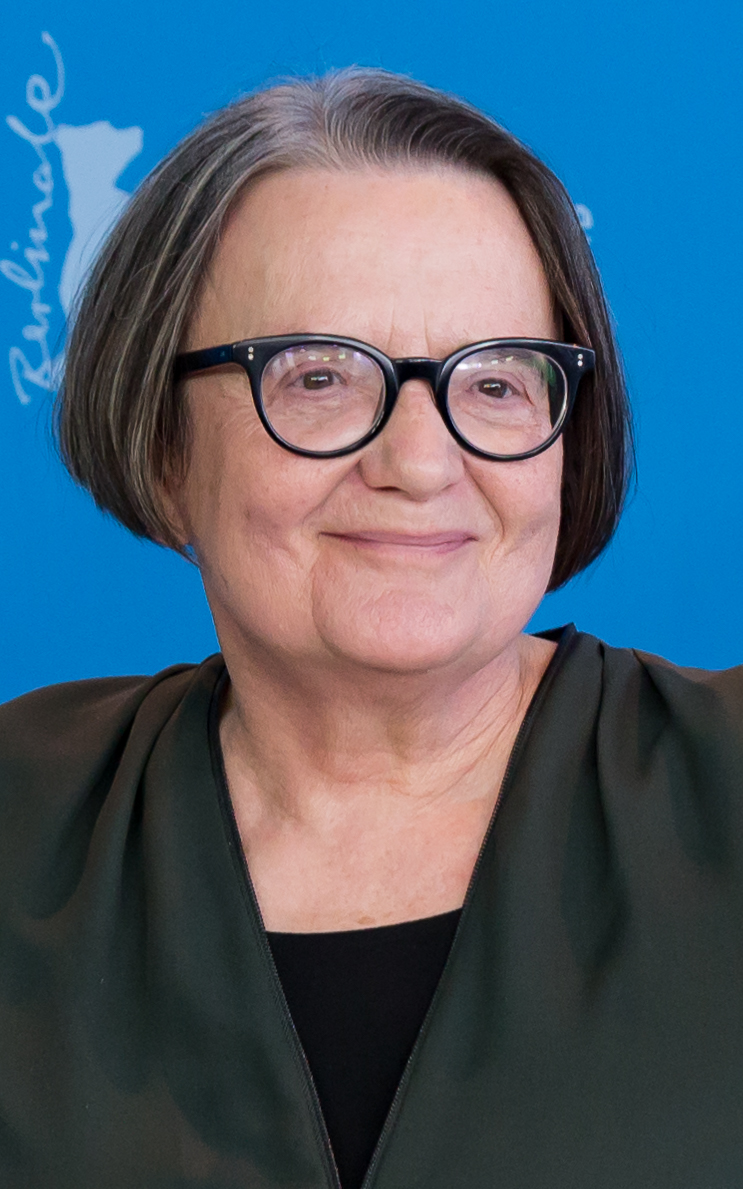
- The 2024 recipient: Agnieszka Holland
- Country: Poland
- Presented by: Polish Film Academy
- First award: 1999
- Currently held by: Agnieszka Holland (2024)
- Website: pnf.pl

The Polish Academy Life Achievement Award is an honorary Polish Film Award bestowed by the Polish Film Academy for outstanding contributions to the cinema of Poland.

== Recipients ==
- 1999: Wojciech Has
- 2000: Andrzej Wajda
- 2001: Stanisław Różewicz
- 2002: Tadeusz Konwicki
- 2003: Roman Polanski
- 2004: Kazimierz Kutz
- 2005: Jerzy Kawalerowicz
- 2006: Jerzy Hoffman
- 2007: Witold Sobociński
- 2008: Janusz Morgenstern
- 2009: Jerzy Wójcik
- 2010: Jerzy Stefan Stawiński
- 2011: Tadeusz Chmielewski
- 2012: Janusz Majewski
- 2013: Danuta Szaflarska
- 2014: Kazimierz Karabasz
- 2015: Franciszek Pieczka
- 2016: Janusz Gajos
- 2017: Sylwester Chęciński
- 2018: Jerzy Stuhr
- 2019: Krzysztof Zanussi
- 2020: Maja Komorowska
- 2021: Jerzy Matuszkiewicz
- 2022: Jerzy Skolimowski
- 2023: Jan A.P. Kaczmarek
- 2024: Agnieszka Holland
