= Michał Żebrowski =

Polish actor and singer

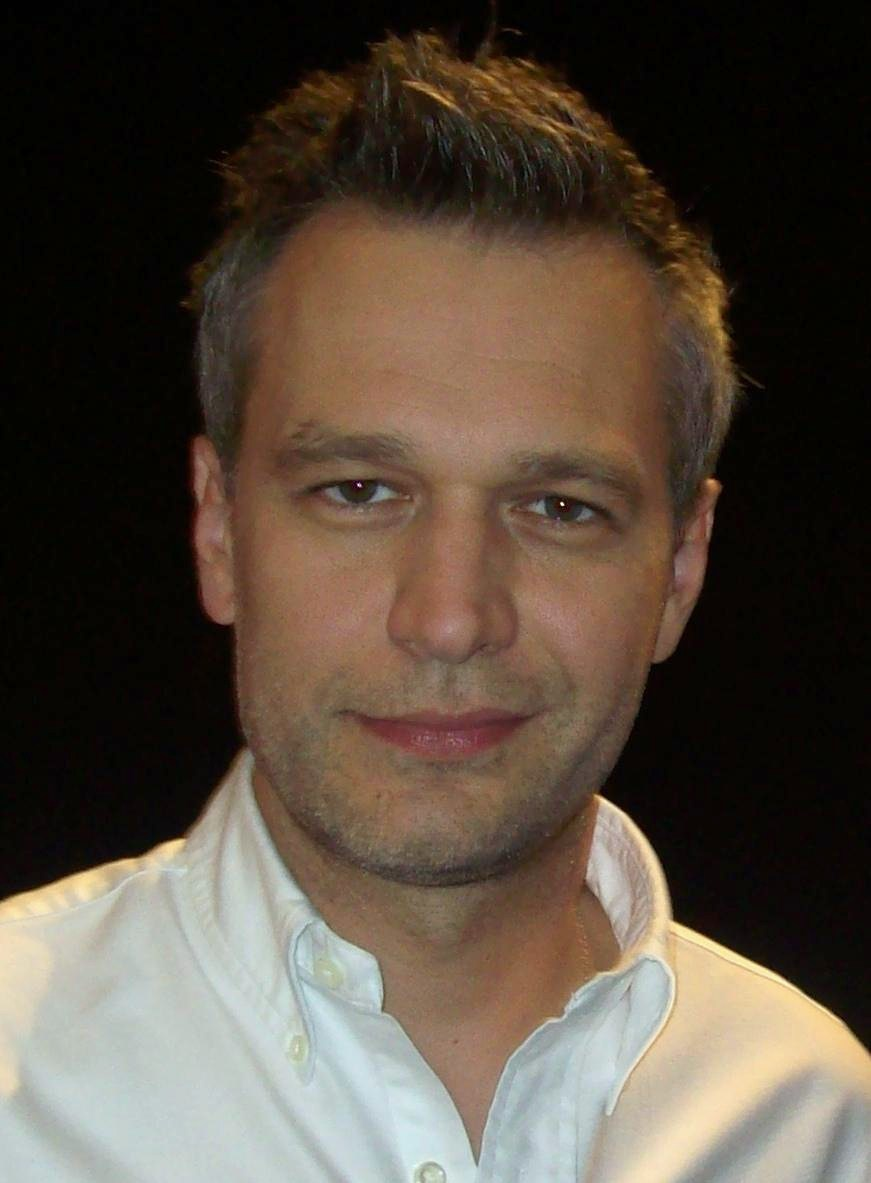
- Żebrowski in 2012
- Born: 17 June 1972 (age 54); Warsaw, Poland
- Education: The Aleksander Zelwerowicz National Academy of Dramatic Art in Warsaw
- Occupations: Actor, singer
- Spouse: Aleksandra Adamczyk (m. 2009)
- Children: 3
- Musical career
- Genres: Pop, sung poetry
- Labels: Zic Zac, BMG Poland, Good Summer, Sony Music Entertainment Poland

Michał Jan Żebrowski (born 17 June 1972) is a Polish actor and singer. He was the first actor to portray Geralt of Rivia, in the movie The Hexer.

== Filmography ==
=== Film ===
Year	English title	Original Title	Role	Notes
1993		Samowolka	Pawlik	
1994	Room for Rent	Wynajmę pokój...	Olek	
1996		Poznań 56	Zenek	
1999	Tadeusz: The Last Foray in Lithuania	Pan Tadeusz	Tadeusz Soplica	
1999	With Fire and Sword	Ogniem i Mieczem	Jan Skrzetuski	Polish Film Awards nominee for the best main male role
2001	The Hexer	Wiedźmin	Geralt of Rivia	Polish Film Awards nominee for the best main male role
2002	The Pianist	Pianista	Jurek	
2003	An Ancient Tale: When the Sun Was a God	Stara baśń - kiedy słońce było bogiem	Ziemek	
2003		Sloow	famous actor	
2003	Sinbad: Legend of the Seven Seas	Sindbad: Legenda siedmiu mórz	Sindbad	dubbing in Polish edition
2004	The Welts	Pręgi	Wojciech Winkler	Złota Kaczka award for the best actor Września award for the best male role Polish Film Awards nominee for the best main male role
2005		Kochankowie roku tygrysa	Wolski	
2005		Bitwa o Warszawę - Powstanie w 44.		narration
2006	Who Never Lived	Kto nigdy nie żył...	Father Jan	
2007	1612	1612	Polish hetman Kybowsky	in Russian
2008	Horton Hears a Who!		Horton	dubbing in Polish edition
2009	Janosik: A True Story	Janosik. Prawdziwa historia	Turjag Huncaga	
2010	In the Style of Jazz	...в стиле JAZZ	Sergei Saveliev	
2013	1939 Battle of Westerplatte	Tajemnica Westerplatte	Major Henryk Sucharski	
2016	Doctor Strange		Doctor Strange	dubbing in Polish edition
2017	All or Nothing	Všetko alebo nič	Jakub	
2017	Thor: Ragnarok		Doctor Strange	dubbing in Polish edition

=== Television ===
Year	English title	Original Title	Role	Notes
1997		Sława i chwała (series)	Janusz Myszyński	
2000		Ogniem i mieczem (series)	Jan Skrzetuski	
2002	The Hexer	Wiedźmin	Geralt of Rivia	
2002–2003		Kasia i Tomek	himself	season 1 episode 27 season 2 episode 7
2004		Stara baśń (series)	Ziemowit	
2009		Janosik. Prawdziwa historia	Turjag Huncaga	
2011–present		Na dobre i na złe	Prof. Andrzej Falkowicz	
2018	The Chairman's Ear	Ucho Prezesa	actor playing chairman's role in the movie Tytan	ep. 41–42
2019	The Witcher		Geralt of Rivia	dubbing in Polish edition

=== Video games ===
Year	Title	Voice role	Notes
2010	God of War III	Hercules	Polish dubbing
2011	Afterfall: Insanity	Albert Tokaj	Polish dubbing
2017	Star Wars Battlefront II	Gideon Hask	Polish dubbing
2020	Cyberpunk 2077	Johnny Silverhand	Polish dubbing

== Discography ==
=== Studio albums ===
Title	Album details	Peak chart positions	Sales	Certifications
Title	Album details	POL	Sales	Certifications
Zakochany Pan Tadeusz	Released: 1999; Label: BMG Poland; Formats: CD	24	POL: 50,000+	POL: Platinum
Lubię, kiedy kobieta	Released: June 25, 2001; Label: Zic Zac/BMG Poland; Formats: CD	4		
Poczytaj mi tato	Released: May 19, 2003; Label: Zic Zac/BMG Poland; Formats: CD	26		
Poczytaj mi tato 2	Released: October 20, 2002; Label: Zic Zac/BMG Poland; Formats: CD	26		
Poczytaj mi tato 3	Released: April 9, 2003; Label: Zic Zac/BMG Poland; Formats: CD	20		
Mały Książę	Released: May 25, 2009; Label: Sony Music Entertainment Poland; Formats: CD	1		
Hans Christian Andersen Baśnie	Released: May 30, 2009; Label: Sony Music Entertainment Poland; Formats: CD	32	POL: 10,000+	POL: Platinum
"—" denotes a recording that did not chart or was not released in that territory.

=== Other ===
Title	Album details	Notes
Kolacja Przy Świecach	Released: 2002; Label: Good Summer; Formats: CD	Gala magazine insert

=== Music videos ===
Title	Year	Album
"Upojenie" with Anna Maria Jopek	2002	Lubię, kiedy kobieta
"Wspomnienie" with Anna Maria Jopek	2002	Lubię, kiedy kobieta
"Niepewność" with Kasia Stankiewicz	2002	Lubię, kiedy kobieta
