= Zygmunt Konieczny =

Polish composer (born 1937)

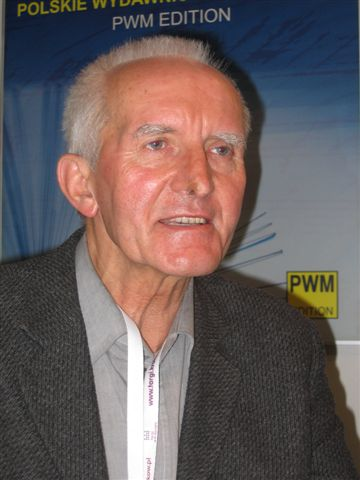
- Zygmunt Konieczny, Kraków, 27 October 2007
- Born: 3 January 1937 (age 89); Kraków
- Occupation: Composer
- Website: zygmuntkonieczny.pl

Zygmunt Konieczny (born 3 January 1937) is a Polish composer of theatre and film music.

== Biography ==
=== Early life ===
Konieczny spent his childhood in the village of Szczyrzyc. He is brother of Leszek Konieczny.

=== Professional work ===
He debuted in 1959 in the cabaret Piwnica pod Baranami in Kraków. Zygmunt Konieczny composed pieces for film, theater performances and singers.

== Composed songs ==
Source.

- Grande Valse Brillante
- Karuzela z madonnami
- Wyzwolenie (1976)
- Noc Listopadowa (1977)

He co-composed Anna Szałapak and Michał Zabłocki record Anikoty (2026).

== Filmography ==
Source.

- Słońce wschodzi raz na dzień (1967)
- Jak daleko stąd, jak blisko (1971)
- Skorpion, panna i łucznik (1972)
- Przeprowadzka (1972)
- Palec boży (1972)
- Kaprysy Łazarza (1972; TV film)
- W domu (1975; TV film)
- Opadły liście z drzew (1975)
- Zaklęty dwór (1976; TV series)
- Za metą start (1976; TV film)
- Ognie są jeszcze żywe (1976)
- Zmory (1978)
- Útközben (1979)
- Podróż do Arabii (1979)
- Golem (1979)
- Elegia (1979)
- Rycerz (1980)
- W obronie własnej (1981)
- Wigilia '81 (1982)
- Dolina Issy (1982)
- Wir (1983)
- Mgła (1983)
- Kartka z podróży (1983)
- Fucha (1983)
- Diabeł (1985; TV film)
- Lucyna (1986; TV film)
- Tabu (1987)
- Ciene (1987)
- The Possessed (1988)
- Lawa (1989)
- Ucieczka z kina Wolność (1990)
- Pogrzeb kartofla (1990)
- Potyautasok (1990)
- Kraj świata (1993)
- Jańcio Wodnik (1993)
- Grający z talerza (1995)
- Historia kina w Popielawach (1998)
- Wrota Europy (1999)
- Szczęśliwy człowiek (2000)
- Prymas. Trzy lata z tysiąca (2000)
- Pornografia (2003)
- The Unburied Man (2004)
- Jasminum (2006)
- Istnienie (2007)
- Nie ten człowiek (2010)
- Święty interes (2010)
- 1920. Wojna i miłość (2010; TV series)
- Figurant (2023)

== Books ==
- Księgi nieczyste. Austeria. 2023. ISBN 9788378666684. Co-authored with Jan Kanty Pawluśkiewicz and Jakub Baran. Illustrated by Sebastian Kudas.

== Accolades ==
He won the 2003 Georges Delerue Award for his score of the film Pornografia. He received Polish Academy Award for Best Film Score three times: in 1999 for Historia kina w Popielawach, in 2004 for Pornografia and in 2007 for Jasminum.
