= Milenia Fiedler =

Polish film editor (born 1966)

- Born: 20 December 1966; Łódź
- Citizenship: Polish
- Occupations: film editor cinematographer

Milenia Daria Fiedler (born 20 December 1966) is a Polish film editor.

== Biography ==
She graduated in film editing from Film and TV School of the Academy of Performing Arts in Prague and obtained her Ph.D. in 2005. In 2020 she became rector of the Łódź Film School.

Among others, she worked with Andrzej Wajda, Janusz Majewski, Wojciech Marczewski, Jerzy Stuhr and Janusz Zaorski. She is the chairman of the Polish Film Editors Society (Polskie Stowarzyszenie Montażystów).

Fiedler was nominated for the Polish Academy Award for Best Editing three times (2002, 2008, 2014). In 2002, she won the award for Weiser, for which she also received the Award for Best Editing at the Gdynia Film Festival.

== Selected filmography ==
- 1997: Czas zdrady
- 1999: The Gateway of Europe
- 2001: In Desert and Wilderness
- 2007: Jutro idziemy do kina
- 2007: Katyń
- 2009: Tatarak
- 2013: Walesa. Man of Hope
- 2014: Obywatel
- 2014: Obce ciało
- 2014: Letnie przesilenie
- 2015: Panie Dulskie
- 2015: Excentrycy, czyli po słonecznej stronie ulicy
- 2016: Blindness
- 2016: Mały Jakub
- 2017: Ach śpij kochanie
- 2018: Kamerdyner
- 2018: Eter (2018 film)
- 2019: Sługi wojny
- 2019: Czarny mercedes
- 2020: Magic Mountains
- 2020: Wyzwanie
- 2020: Osiecka (TV series; episodes 1, 2, 13)
- 2020: Osaczony (TV series; episode 1)
- 2020: Ludzie i bogowie (TV series; episodes 1, 3, 5, 7, 9, 11)
- 2020: Antyle Chopina
- 2021: Splendid Isolation
- 2021: Stado
- 2022: Głos
- 2022: Liczba doskonała
- 2023: Danger Zone
- 2024: Pani od polskiego
- 2024: Skrzyżowanie
