= Paweł Mykietyn =

Polish composer (born 1971)

- Born: 20 May 1971 (age 55); Oława, Poland
- Occupations: Composer; Clarinetist

Paweł Jan Mykietyn (Polish pronunciation: [ˈpavɛw mɨˈkjɛtɨn]; born 20 May 1971) is a Polish award-winning composer and clarinetist.

By the year 2012, Mykietyn had written two symphonies, cello, piano and violin concertos, St. Marc Passions for soprano, narrator, choir and orchestra, some chamber music and musical King Lear. As a film composer he collaborated with Andrzej Wajda in Sweet Rush (2009), Jerzy Skolimowski in Essential Killing, 11 Minutes, and EO, and Małgorzata Szumowska in It and 33 Scenes from Life.

He is the recipient of many national and international awards and honours including the European Film Award for Best Composer (2022), Cannes Soundtrack Award (2022), Fryderyk Award (2009) and the Knight's Cross of the Order of Polonia Restituta (2011).

== Life and career ==
Paweł Mykietyn graduated in music composition under the guidance of Włodzimierz Kotoński at the Fryderyk Chopin Music Academy in Warsaw in 1997. He participated in The Summer Composition Courses in Kazimierz Dolny (1991,1992,1993) and Gaudeamus Music Week in Amsterdam (1992). At the age of 22 he made his Warsaw Autumn Festival debut, with work La Strada. In 1994, as a clarinetist he won second edition contest 20th century music of Young Composers organized by the Polish Society of Contemporary Music. In 1995 his composition “3 for 13”, commissioned by Polish Radio, was placed first in the under 30 category at the UNESCO International Composers Rostrum in Paris.

Mykietyn is the founder of, and clarinetist in, the ensemble “Nonstrom” which has specialized in the performance of contemporary music. Since 1996 he has composed music for most of Krzysztof Warlikowski's productions. Occasionally he has worked with Grzegorz Jarzyna and Andrzej Woron. He is also a composer for the movies Mariusz Treliński's Egoists, Małgorzata Szumowska's It and Jerzy Skolimowski's Essential Killing.

In 2011, Paweł Mykietyn was honored with the Knight's Cross of the Order of Polonia Restituta for outstanding contribution to national culture and the promotion of Polish art in the world. In 2012, he was awarded Prix for Musique Sacem France for music to the film Essential Killing by Jerzy Skolimowski.

== Awards and honours ==
- European Film Award for Best Composer (2022)
- Cannes Soundtrack Award (2022)
- Silver Medal for Merit to Culture – Gloria Artis (2015)
- Special Konrad Swinarski Prize (2015)
- Prix for Musique SACEM France (2012)
- Knight's Cross of the Order of Polonia Restituta (2011)
- Fryderyk Award (2009)
- Paszport Polityki (2000)

== Notable works ==
- At Radek's (1993)
- 3 for 13 (1994) - first prize in the young composers' category during the UNESCO International Rostrum of Composers in Paris in 1995, commissioned by the Polish Radio
- Epiphora (1996) - first prize in the young composers' category at the UNESCO 4th International Rostrum of Electro-acoustic Music in AMsterdam, commissioned by the Polish Radio
- Piano Concerto (1997)
- Shakespeare's Sonnets (2000)
- Klave (2004)
- Becoming Fine (Ładnienie) (2004)
- Second Symphony (2007)
- St. Mark Passion (2008)
- Third Symphony (2011)
- King Lear (2012)
- Walesa. Man of Hope (2013)
- The Other Lamb (2019)
- STOP (2020) for carillon
- EO (2022)
- War Game (2024)

== See also ==
- Music of Poland
- List of Polish composers
