= Tatarak =

2009 film written and directed by Andrzej Wajda

Sweet Rush
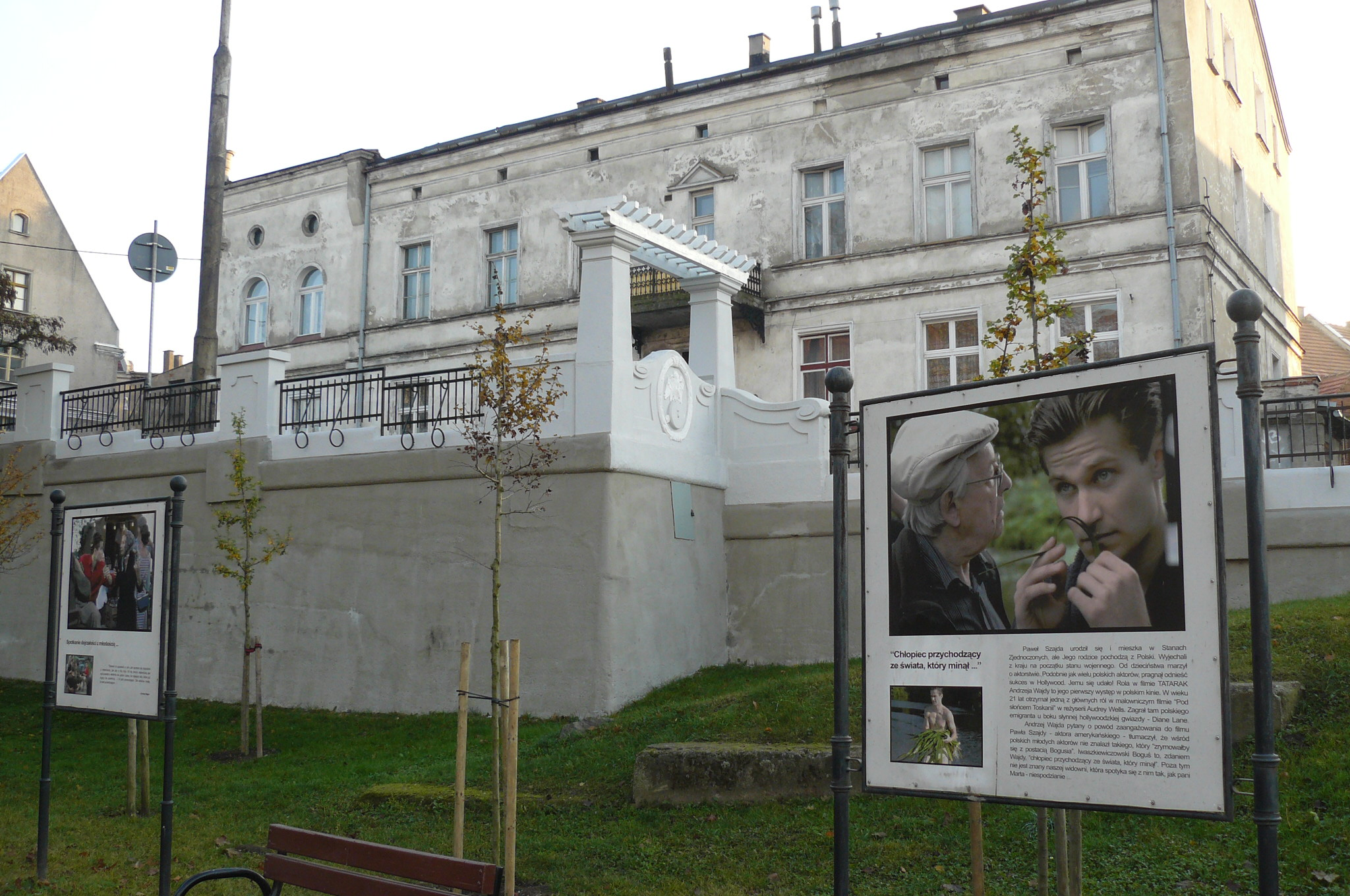
- An exhibition of snapshots of photographs taken from the movie "Tatarak"
- Directed by: Andrzej Wajda
- Written by: Andrzej Wajda
- Produced by: Michał Kwieciński
- Starring: Krystyna Janda; Paweł Szajda
- Cinematography: Paweł Edelman
- Edited by: Milenia Fiedler
- Music by: Paweł Mykietyn
- Release date: 2009
- Running time: 85 minutes
- Country: Poland
- Language: Polish
- Box office: $265 670

Sweet Rush (Polish: Tatarak) is a 2009 Polish drama film directed by Andrzej Wajda. The film won the Alfred Bauer Prize (in tie with Giant) at the 59th Berlin International Film Festival in 2009.

The film is set in a small town in Poland in the late 1950s, where an aging woman married to a workaholic doctor meets a young man who makes her feel young again. Framed around this story, lead actress Krystyna Janda discusses the death of her husband Edward Kłosiński from cancer.

== Cast ==
- Krystyna Janda – Marta / Actress
- Paweł Szajda – Boguś K.
- Jan Englert – Doctor
- Jadwiga Jankowska-Cieślak – Friend
- Julia Pietrucha – Halinka
- Roma Gąsiorowska – Housekeeper
- Krzysztof Skonieczny − Stasiek
- Paweł Tomaszewski – Bridge player
- Mateusz Kościukiewicz – Bridge player
- Marcin Łuczak – Bridge player

Source.
