= Wałęsa: Man of Hope =

2013 Polish biopic film

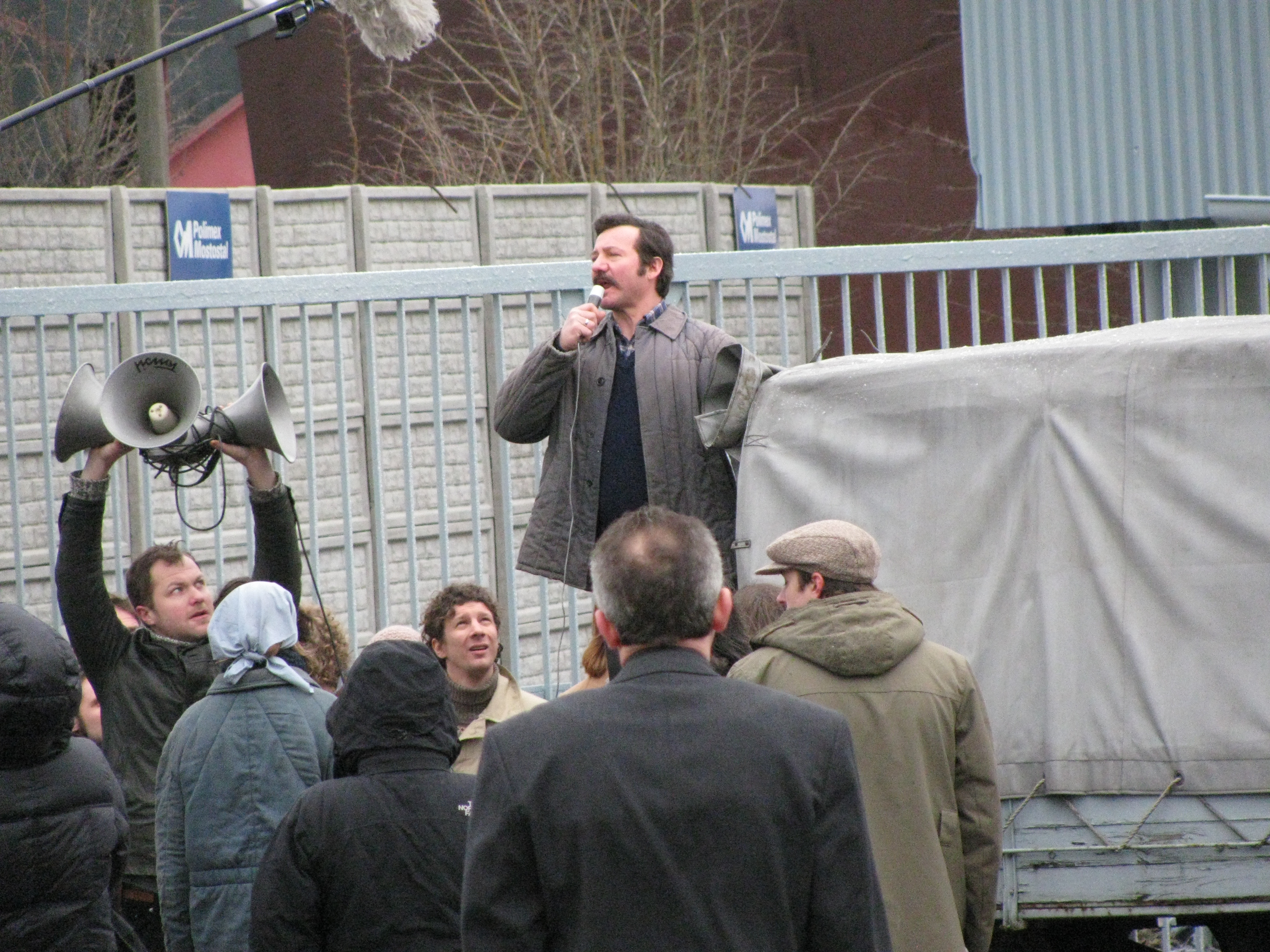
- Robert Więckiewicz as Lech Wałęsa
- Directed by: Andrzej Wajda
- Screenplay by: Janusz Głowacki
- Story by: Janusz Głowacki
- Produced by: Michał Kwieciński
- Starring: Robert Więckiewicz; Agnieszka Grochowska; Maria Rosaria Omaggio; Zbigniew Zamachowski; Cezary Kosiński; Maciej Stuhr
- Cinematography: Paweł Edelman
- Edited by: Milenia Fiedler
- Music by: Paweł Mykietyn
- Production companies: Akson Studio; Canal +
- Release dates: 5 September 2013 (Venice); 8 October 2013 (Poland)
- Country: Poland
- Language: Polish
- Budget: 3.5 million €
- Box office: $ 5 250 588

Wałęsa: Man of Hope (Polish: Wałęsa. Człowiek z nadziei [vaˈwɛ̃sa ˈt͡ʂwɔvjɛɡ z naˈd͡ʑɛ.i]) is a 2013 Polish biopic film directed by Andrzej Wajda, starring Robert Więckiewicz as Lech Wałęsa. Wajda stated at Kraków's Off Plus Camera Film Festival in April 2012 that he foresaw trouble following the film's release. The film was selected as the Polish entry for the Best Foreign Language Film at the 86th Academy Awards, but was not nominated.

== Synopsis ==
Wałęsa, an electrician at the Gdańsk Shipyards, participated in local demonstrations during the 1970s. Following the bloody aftermath, which remains with Wałęsa, he concentrates on his day-to-day duties. Ten years later, a new uprising occurs and he becomes an unexpected and charismatic leader of Polish dockworkers.

Wałęsa's leadership role signified the beginning of a new movement that successfully overcame the communist regime of the period, and Wałęsa is pushed into representing the majority of Poland's population. The Soviet Union, previously regarded as too powerful to confront, eventually grants the movement a degree of acceptance. The Polish example of solidarity then caused a domino effect throughout Eastern Europe: people in Eastern Germany followed the Polish example, starting demonstrations for freedom that achieved the German reunification peacefully. The Soviet Union then dissolved alongside SFR Yugoslavia.

While Europe is reshaped, Poland remains stable and peaceful. Yet a huge variety of political parties unfolds and Poland is on the brink of becoming as ungovernable as the late Weimar Republic. Wałęsa is subsequently elected as the first president of the new Polish democracy; but, this is followed by feelings of resentment among the Polish people who start to think that Wałęsa is becoming privileged. Consequently, the Polish people start to seek out ways to diminish Wałęsa's significance, until they finally accomplish their goal through uncovering actions from a past period.

== Background ==
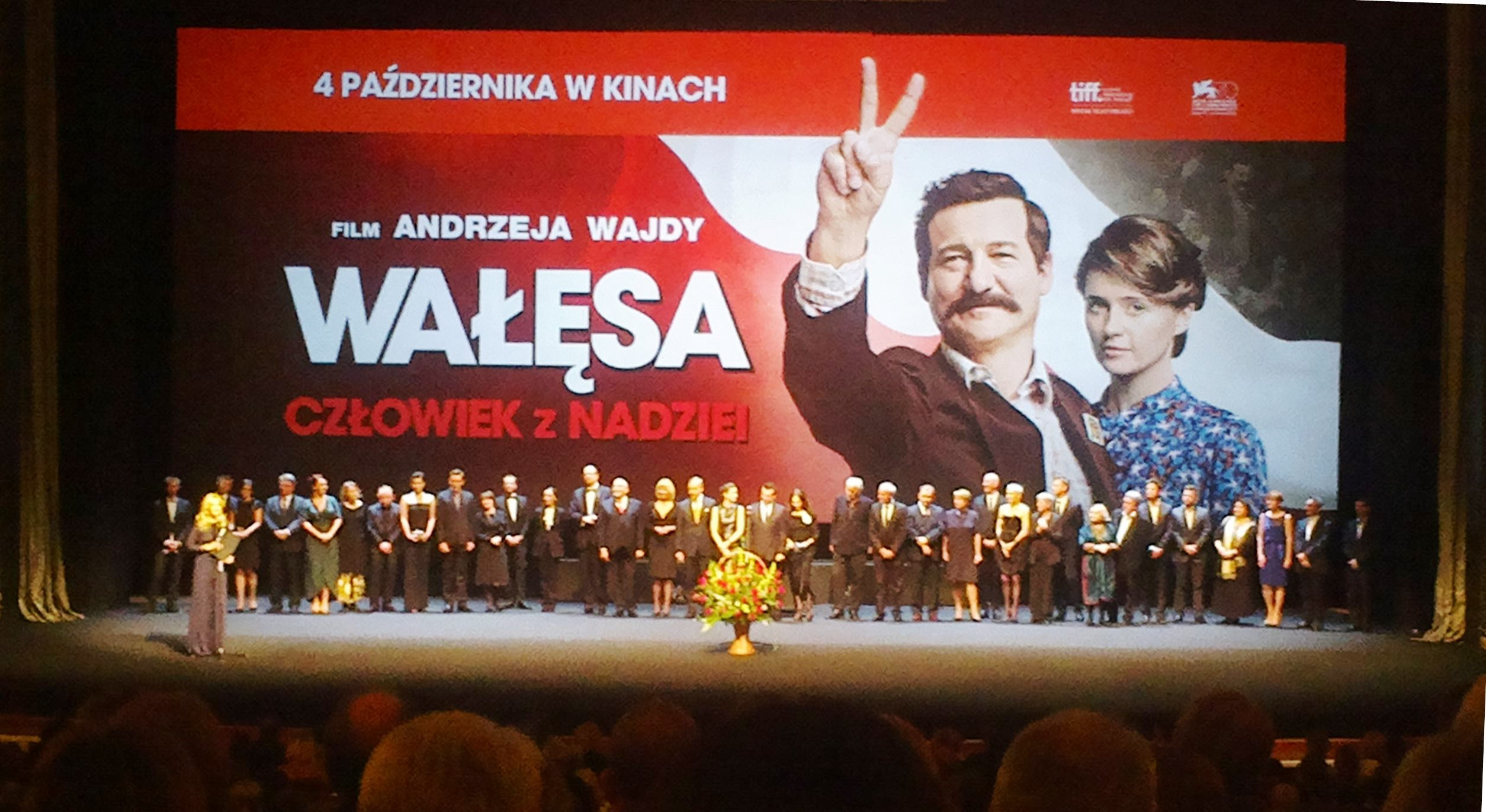
The movie premiere at the Grand Theatre in Warsaw

In April 2011, Wajda said to The Guardian that he intended to make a film to "shine new light on Lech Wałęsa", while author Janusz Głowacki said the film "is not just going to be romanticism. There will be irony, too. Don't worry." Wajda also declared at a press conference that the Nobel laureate and former president of Poland had condoned the project.

Wajda stated that he considered the film the most difficult professional challenge of his filmmaking career thus far. However, he showed a realisation of the categorical imperative and quoted the famous slogan of Wałęsa, a personal friend: "Nie chcę, ale muszę" ("I don’t want to, but I have to").

Monica Bellucci was considered for the role of Oriana Fallaci, but the role ultimately went to Maria Rosaria Omaggio.

== Cast ==
- Robert Więckiewicz as Lech Wałęsa
- Agnieszka Grochowska as Danuta Wałęsa
- Zbigniew Zamachowski as Nawiślak
- Maria Rosaria Omaggio as Oriana Fallaci
- Cezary Kosiński as Majchrzak
- Mirosław Baka as Klemens Gniech
- Iwona Bielska as Ilona, Wałęsa's neighbour
- Maciej Stuhr as Priest
- Małgorzata Zajączkowska as Shop assistant
- Marcin Hycnar as KOR member Rysiek
- Dorota Wellman as Henryka Krzywonos
- Adam Woronowicz as Tadeusz Fiszbach
- Marcin Perchuć as Instruktor
- Ewa Kuryło as Anna Walentynowicz
- Arkadiusz Detmer as Malinowski
- Mateusz Kościukiewicz as Krzysiek
- Piotr Probosz as Mijak
- Jerzy Nasierowski as Mijak's grandpa
- Ewa Kolasińska as Shipyard worker
- Michał Czernecki
- Remigiusz Jankowski as Shipyard worker
- Wojciech Kalarus as Chairman
- Maciej Marczewski as KOR member
- Maciej Konopiński as SB agent
- Marcel Głogowski as Bogdan Wałęsa (aged 8–10)
- Wiktor Malinowski as Jarosław Wałęsa (aged 3–5)
- Kamil Jaworski as Przemysław Wałęsa (aged 5–7)
- Jakub Świderski as Ludwik Prądzyński
- Bogusław Kudłek as Bogdan Borusewicz
- Michał Meyer as Jerzy Borowczak
- Grzegorz Małecki as UB agent
- Ewa Konstancja Bułhak as Customs official
- Damian Jagusz as soldier

== Production ==
Wajda announced his intention to blend real contemporary news material with the fictional content of the film to "give testimony to the truth". The contemporary footage was adapted by superimposing the face of Robert Więckiewicz on Wałęsa's real face. The re-enacted scenes were shot "on location in Gdańsk, including in the historic shipyard and its surroundings, as well as in Warsaw". As Wajda told the Chicago Tribune, the raison d'être of his work was not to entertain the Western world, but to disclose the historic truth for a Polish audience.

Głowacki assured journalists that his script was not meant to be an apotheosis, but instead showed Wałęsa "as a man of flesh and blood, a leader of great strength but also someone who has his weaknesses". The screenwriter was significantly affected upon discovering that Wajda sought to pursue the same approach and consequently "thought it would be an interesting project".

In August 2012, a company known to financial experts as "Amber Gold" was considered as an investor for this film; but, when the company was investigated, it withdrew from the production process.

== Release ==
The film was on the program of the 2014 edition of Thailand's EU Film Festival, shown in the cities of Khon Kaen, Chiang Mai and Bangkok. Alongside films such as the Spanish feature The Pelayos, the film was one of seven films that were shown in all three cities.

== Reception ==
On review aggregator website Rotten Tomatoes, the film holds an approval rating of 63% based on 8 reviews, with an average rating of 7.2/10.

== See also ==
- Dubček (film)
- Havel (film)
- Notable film portrayals of Nobel laureates
- List of submissions to the 86th Academy Awards for Best Foreign Language Film
- List of Polish submissions for the Academy Award for Best Foreign Language Film
