= Who Never Lived =

2006 film

- Directed by: Andrzej Seweryn
- Written by: Maciej Strzembosz
- Produced by: Miroslaw Slowinski
- Starring: Michał Żebrowski
- Cinematography: Piotr Wojtowicz
- Music by: Jan A. P. Kaczmarek
- Release date: 22 September 2006
- Running time: 100 minutes
- Country: Poland
- Language: Polish

Who Never Lived (Polish: Kto nigdy nie żył...) is a 2006 Polish drama film directed by Andrzej Seweryn. It was entered into the 28th Moscow International Film Festival.

== Cast ==
- Michał Żebrowski as Father Jan
- Joanna Sydor as Marta
- Robert Janowski as Pawel
- Teresa Marczewska as Jan's Mother
- Stefan Burczyk as Priest
- Andrzej Zarnecki as Bishop
- Cezary Iber as Krzysztof
- Natalia Rybicka as Kasia
- Mateusz Banasiuk as Mateusz
- Wojciech Mecwaldowski as Artur
- Joanna Liszowska as Elka
- Boguslaw Parchimowicz as Jarek
