= Feliks Falk =

Polish film and theater director

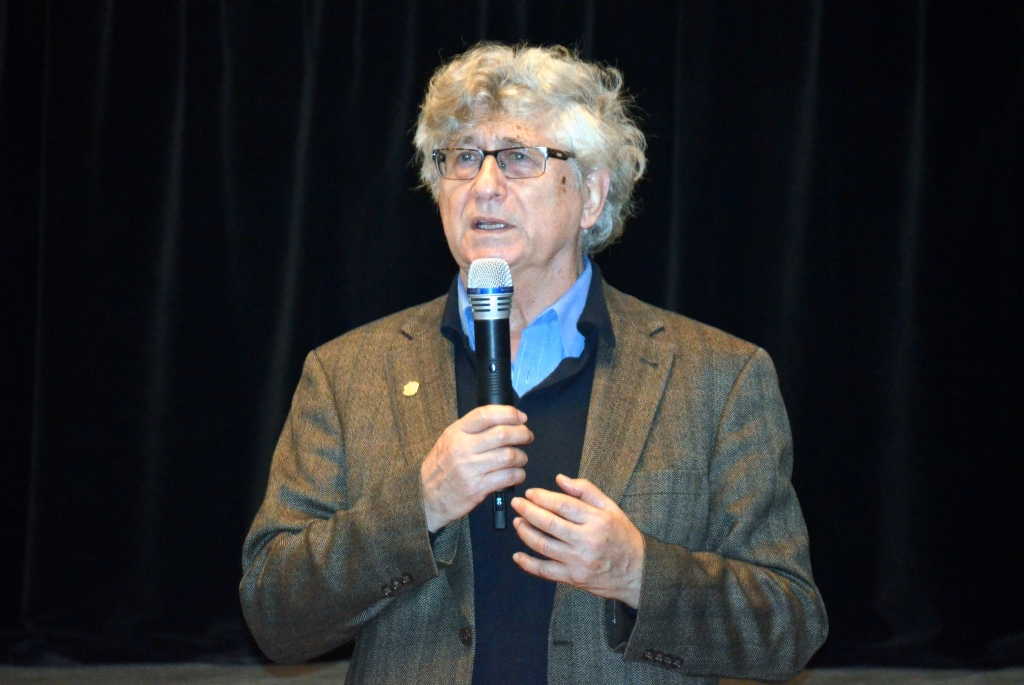
- Feliks Falk, 2014
- Born: 25 February 1941 (age 85); Stanisławów, Ukrainian SSR, Soviet Union
- Occupations: Film director, screenwriter
- Years active: 1971-present

Feliks Falk ps. Robert F. Lane, Edward Neyman (born 25 February 1941) is a Polish film and theater director as well as writer of film scripts, stage plays, television plays, and radio shows.

== Education and Career ==
A 1966 graduate of Warsaw's Academy of Fine Arts, he also is a painter and graphic artist. Falk is one of creators of the 1970s wave of Polish cinematography, called Cinema of Moral Anxiety. His most famous films include Wodzirej (Top Dog) (1977) and Samowolka (AWOL) (1993). Falk has won a number of major filmmaking awards. His 1987 film Hero of the Year was entered into the 15th Moscow International Film Festival where it won the FIPRESCI Prize and a Special Prize.
