= The Master (2005 film) =

2005 film by Piotr Trzaskalski

The Master (Polish: Mistrz) is a 2005 Polish magical-realist film directed by Piotr Trzaskalski and starring Konstantin Lavronenko, Jacek Braciak, Monika Buchowiec and Teresa Branna. It tells the tale of an alcoholic Russian circus performer and Afghan war veteran who is fired from a circus for releasing all the animals in a small Polish town. He is joined by an accordionist, a prostitute and a hitchhiker as they create a traveling show featuring knife-throwing and other conjuring tricks.
