= Polish Film Award =

Annual national film award ceremony

The Eagles Polish Film Awards
- Current: 2026 Polish Film Awards
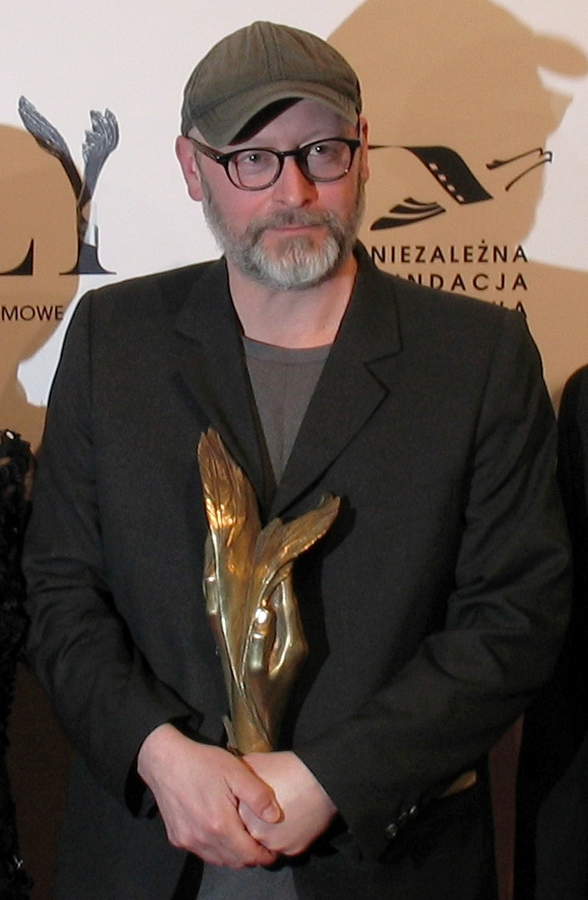
- Director Wojciech Smarzowski holding the award in 2012
- Awarded for: Achievements in Polish cinema
- Country: Poland
- Presented by: Polish Film Academy
- First award: June 21, 1999; 27 years ago
- Website: http://pnf.pl/

The Eagles Polish Film Awards, or The Eagles (Polish: Polskie Nagrody Filmowe Orły, „Orły”) is the national film award of Poland. It has been delivered annually since 1999, with the first event held on 21 June, by the National Chamber of Audiovisual Producers (KIPA). Since 2003 they have been awarded by the Polish Film Academy.

The award ceremony is held under the auspices of the Minister of Culture and National Heritage of Poland. Their status in the Polish film industry can be compared with Academy Awards.

The award depicts outstretched eagle's wings attached to a white socle twined by a ribbon which is reminiscent of a film stock. It was designed by Polish sculptor Adam Fedorowicz.

The 28th Polish Film Awards took place on 9 March 2026. Home Sweet Home, directed by Wojciech Smarzowski, was named Best Film.

== Awards ==
List of main categories:

- Best Film – since 1999
- Best Actor – since 1999
- Best Actress – since 1999
- Supporting Actor – since 2000
- Supporting Actress – since 2000
- Documentary – since 2013
- Film Score – since 1999
- Director – since 1999
- Screenplay – since 1999
- Cinematography – since 1999
- Costume Design – since 2001
- Sound – since 1999
- Editing – since 1999
- Production Design – since 1999
- European Film – since 2005
- Producer – 1999–2001
- Discovery of the Year - since 2008
- TV series – since 2015

Special awards:

- Audience Award
- Special Award
- Life Achievement Award

== Wins and nominations ==
=== List of films with five or more awards ===
- 11 wins – Corpus Christi (2019) (15 nominations)
- 11 wins – The Girl with the Needle (2025) (13 nominations)
- 10 wins – Silent Night (2018) (11 nominations)
- 9 wins – Volhynia (2017) (14 nominations)
- 8 wins – Reverse (2009) (13 nominations)
- 8 wins – The Pianist (2002) (13 nominations)
- 7 wins – 25 Years of Innocence (2020) (15 nominations)
- 7 wins – Cold War (2019) (12 nominations)
- 7 wins – Gods (2015) (13 nominations)
- 7 wins – Rose (2011) (8 nominations)
- 7 wins – Katyń (2007) (11 nominations)
- 7 wins – Jasminum (2006) (9 nominations)
- 7 wins – The Collector (2005) (8 nominations)
- 7 wins – Life as a Fatal Sexually Transmitted Disease (12 nominations)
- 6 wins – The Wedding (2004) (10 nominations)
- 6 wins – My Nikifor (2004) (10 nominations)
- 6 wins – Pan Tadeusz (1999) (11 nominations)
- 6 wins – Scarborn (2024) (16 nominations)
- 5 wins – Little Moscow (2008) (8 nominations)
- 5 wins – Zmruż oczy (2003) (8 nominacji)
- 5 wins – Pornografia (2003) (9 nominations)
- 5 wins – Cześć Tereska (2001) (10 nominations)
- 5 wins – The Debt (1998) (10 nominations)
- 5 wins – Home Sweet Home (2026) (13 nominations)

=== List of films with ten or more nominations ===
Film	Year	Nominations	Wins
Scarborn	2024	16	6
Corpus Christi	2019	15	11
25 Years of Innocence	2020	15	7
White Courage	2025	15	2
Volhynia	2017	14	9
The Girl with the Needle	2025	13	11
The Pianist	2002	13	8
Reverse	2009	13	8
Bogowie	2015	13	7
Home Sweet Home	2026	13	5
Filip	2024	13	4
Doppelgänger	2024	13	1
Leave No Traces	2022	13	1
The Hater	2020	13	0
Life as a Fatal Sexually Transmitted Disease	2000	12	7
Prymas. Trzy lata z tysiąca	2000	12	1
Jack Strong	2015	12	1
Cold War	2018	12	7
EO	2023	11	6
Icarus.The Legend of Mietek Kosz	2019	11	2
Katyń	2007	11	7
Pan Tadeusz	1999	11	6
Kulej: All That Glitters Isn't Gold	2025	11	1
Tydzień z życia mężczyzny	1999	11	0
Mój Nikifor	2004	10	6
The Wedding	2004	10	6
Cześć Tereska	2001	10	5
The Debt	1999	10	5
Ostatnia rodzina	2017	10	4
Obława	2012	10	4
33 Scenes from Life	2008	10	4
Persona non grata	2005	10	4
Historia kina w Popielawach	1998	10	4
Weiser	2001	10	3
Edi	2002	10	2
I Never Cry	2020	10	2
No Ghosts on Good Street	2026	10	2
The Wedding Day	2022	10	1
The Welts	2004	10	1
Kroniki domowe	1998	10	1
Charlatan	2020	10	1
Franz	2026	10	1
Brother	2026	10	0
Tam i z powrotem	2002	10	0

=== Directors with two or more awards ===
Director	Noms.	Wins.
Wojciech Smarzowski	4	4
Maciej Pieprzyca	3	3
Krzysztof Krauze	3	2
Jerzy Skolimowski	3	2
Andrzej Jakimowski	2	2
Roman Polański	2	2

=== Most wins by actresses ===
- Kinga Preis – 16 nominations, 6 awards
- Agata Kulesza – 10 nominations, 4 awards
- Aleksandra Konieczna – 3 nominations, 3 awards
- Stanisława Celińska – 5 nominations, 2 awards
- Danuta Szaflarska – 5 nominations, 2 awards
- Maja Ostaszewska – 5 nominations, 2 awards
- Danuta Stenka – 4 nominations, 2 awards
- Joanna Kulig – 3 nominations, 2 awards
- Dominika Ostałowska – 3 nominations, 2 awards
- Krystyna Feldman – 2 nominations, 2 awards

=== Most wins by actors ===
- Janusz Gajos – 12 nominations, 5 awards
- Robert Więckiewicz – 8 nominations, 5 awards
- Arkadiusz Jakubik – 9 nominations, 4 awards
- Jan Frycz – 8 nominations, 3 awards
- Jacek Braciak – 5 nominations, 3 awards
- Andrzej Chyra – 7 nominations, 2 awards
- Dawid Ogrodnik - 5 nominations, 2 awards
- Zbigniew Zamachowski – 5 nominations, 2 awards

=== Most nominations ===
- Kinga Preis – 16 nominations for best actress
- Marek Wronko – 12 nominations for best sound editing
- Wojciech Kilar – 10 nominations for best score
- Wanda Zeman – 10 nominations for best film editing
- Magdalena Biedrzycka – 10 nominations for best costume design
- Jagna Janicka – 10 nominations (7 for best costume design and 3 for best production design)
- Nikodem Wołk-Łaniewski – 9 nominations for sound editing
- Janusz Gajos – 9 nominations for best actor

=== Most wins overall ===
- Krzysztof Ptak – 7 awards for best cinematography
- Jacek Hamela – 6 awards for best sound editing
- Kinga Preis – 5 awards for best actress
- Janusz Gajos – 5 awards (4 for best actor and 1 lifetime achievement award)
- Wojciech Kilar – 4 awards for best score
- Robert Więckiewicz – 4 awards for best actor

=== "Big Five" winners and nominees ===
The following is a list of films that won the awards for Best Film, Director, Actor, Actress and Screenplay.

==== Winners ====
- The Collector (2005)
1. Best Film: The Collector
2. Best Director: Feliks Falk
3. Best Screenplay: Feliks Falk
4. Best Actress: Kinga Preis
5. Best Actor: Andrzej Chyra
- Corpus Christi (2019)
1. Best Film: Corpus Christi
2. Best Director: Jan Komasa
3. Best Screenplay: Mateusz Pacewicz
4. Best Actress: Aleksandra Konieczna
5. Best Actor: Bartosz Bielenia

==== Nominees ====
Four awards won

- Life as a Fatal Sexually Transmitted Disease (2000): Best Film, Best Director (Krzysztof Zanussi), Best Screenplay (Krzysztof Zanussi) and Best Actor (Zbigniew Zapasiewicz); lost: Best Actress (Krystyna Janda)
- Cześć Tereska (2001): Best Film, Best Director (Robert Gliński), Best Screenplay (Jacek Wyszomirski) and Best Actor (Zbigniew Zamachowski); lost: Best Actress (Aleksandra Gietner)
- Zmruż oczy (2002): Best Film, Best Director (Andrzej Jakimowski), Best Screenplay (Andrzej Jakimowski) and Best Actor (Zbigniew Zamachowski); lost: Best Actress (Aleksandra Prószyńska)
- Róża (2012): Best Film, Best Director (Wojciech Smarzowski), Best Screenplay (Michał Szczerbic) and Best Actress (Agata Kulesza); lost: Best Actor (Marcin Dorociński)
- Body/Ciało (2016): Best Film, Best Director (Małgorzata Szumowska), Best Actor (Janusz Gajos) and Best Actress (Maja Ostaszewska); lost: Best Screenplay (Michał Englert, Małgorzata Szumowska)
- Cold War (2018): Best Film, Best Director (Paweł Pawlikowski), Best Screenplay (Janusz Głowacki and Paweł Pawlikowski) and Best Actress (Joanna Kulig); lost: Best Actor (Tomasz Kot)

Three awards won

- Reverse (2009): Best Film, Best Screenplay (Andrzej Bart) and Best Actress (Agata Buzek); lost: Best Director (Borys Lankosz), Best Actor (Marcin Dorociński)
- Ostatnia rodzina (2017): Best Screenplay (Robert Bolesto), Best Actor (Andrzej Seweryn) and Best Actress (Aleksandra Konieczna); lost: Best Film, lost Best Director (Jan P. Matuszyński)

== See also ==
- Gdynia Film Festival
- Polish cinema
