= Gods (film) =

2014 Polish film by Łukasz Palkowski

- Film poster
- Bogowie
- Directed by: Łukasz Palkowski
- Written by: Krzysztof Rak
- Produced by: Piotr Woźniak-Starak
- Starring: Tomasz Kot; Szymon Piotr Warszawski; Piotr Głowacki; Magdalena Czerwińska; Jan Englert; Kinga Preis
- Cinematography: Piotr Sobociński Jr.
- Edited by: Jarosław Barzan
- Music by: Bartosz Chajdecki
- Production company: Watchout Productions
- Release date: October 10, 2014
- Running time: 112 minutes
- Country: Poland
- Language: Polish
- Box office: 11,960,658 $

Gods (Polish: Bogowie) is a 2014 Polish biographical feature film directed by Łukasz Palkowski. It is based on the life and career of Polish cardiac surgeon Zbigniew Religa, who performed the first successful heart transplant in Poland in 1987. The movie received the Golden Lions award for best film at the 39th Gdynia Film Festival (2014) and the Eagle at the Polish Film Awards (2015). Production of the film took place in autumn 2013.

== Cast ==
- Tomasz Kot – Zbigniew Religa
- Piotr Głowacki – Marian Zembala
- Szymon Piotr Warszawski – Andrzej Bochenek
- Magdalena Czerwińska – Anna Religa
- Rafał Zawierucha – Romuald Cichoń
- Marta Ścisłowicz – nurse Magda
- Karolina Piechota – nurse Krysia
- Wojciech Solarz – anesthesiologist
- Arkadiusz Janiczek – perfusionist
- Cezary Kosiński – Roman Włodarski
- Konrad Bugaj – doctor
- Magdalena Kaczmarek – nurse Jolka
- Magdalena Wróbel – nurse Michalina
- Milena Suszyńska – nurse Gośka
- Jan Englert – professor Wacław Sitkowski
- Władysław Kowalski – Jan Moll
- Zbigniew Zamachowski – Stanisław Pasyk
- Marian Opania – Jan Nielubowicz
- Małgorzata Łata – Ewka
- Kinga Preis – Ewka's mother
- Ryszard Kotys – ethics committee member
- Włodzimierz Adamski – ethics committee member
- Marian Zembala – ethics committee member
- Andrzej Bochenek – ethics committee member
- David Price – speaker (Dr. Barnard)
- Magdalena Lamparska – waitress

== See also ==
- Cinema of Poland
- List of Gdynia Film Festival winners
