= The Collector (2005 film) =

2005 Polish film

- Polish: Komornik
- Directed by: Feliks Falk
- Written by: Grzegorz Łoszewski
- Produced by: Janusz Morgenstern, Pawel Mossakowski, Andrzej Serdiukow, Wlodzimierz Nideraus
- Starring: Andrzej Chyra; Małgorzata Kożuchowska
- Cinematography: Bartosz Prokopowicz
- Music by: Bartłomiej Gliniak
- Release date: 7 October 2005
- Running time: 100 minutes
- Country: Poland
- Language: Polish
- Box office: $ 496 454

The Collector (Polish: Komornik) is a 2005 Polish drama film directed by Feliks Falk. It was the Polish submission for the 2005 Academy Award for Best Foreign Language Film. Shooting for the film began in November 2004 and was completed on January 5, 2005. Shooting was taken in Warsaw and Wałbrzych.

== Plot ==
The "collector" of the title is Lucjan Bohme, a bailiff employed to collect debts for a court in the town of Wałbrzych. He carries out his job with ruthless efficiency until a meeting with a former girlfriend, now struggling to bring up her child, leads him to question his attitudes.

== Cast ==
- Andrzej Chyra – Lucjan Bohme
- Małgorzata Kożuchowska – Anna Zenke
- Kinga Preis – Gosia Bednarek
- Grzegorz Wojdon – Jasiek Marczak
- Jan Frycz – Chudy
- Sławomir Orzechowski – Wiśniak
- Marian Dziędziel – Horst
- Marian Opania – Robert Chełst

== Awards ==
At the 30th Gdynia Film Festival in 2005, The Collector won the Golden Lions for the best film.

In 2006, the film turned out to be the undisputed winner of the Polish Film Awards — it won seven Eagles.

The film also won the Ecumenical Jury Prize at the Berlin International Film Festival.
