= Jagna Janicka =

Polish film and stage costume and scene designer

- Born: 1959 (age 66–67); Poland
- Education: Jan Matejko Academy of Fine Arts
- Occupations: Costume designer; stage designer

Jagna Janicka (born 1959) is a Polish film and stage costume and scene designer.

She graduated from the Jan Matejko Academy of Fine Arts, Kraków, Department of Stage, Film and TV Scenic Design, in 1987. She is a member of the Polish Film Academy and the European Film Academy.

== Selected awards ==
- 2012: Gdynia Film Festival award for costume design, In Darkness
- 2015: Gdynia Film Festival award for scenic design, Hiszpanka
- 2015: Eagle Award for scenic design, Hiszpanka
- 2016: Chicago International Film Festival for her work on The Last Family
- 2018: Gdynia Film Festival award for scenic design, Clergy
