= The Welts =

2004 film by Magdalena Piekorz

- Polish: Pręgi
- Directed by: Magdalena Piekorz
- Written by: Wojciech Kuczok
- Produced by: Włodzimierz Otulak; Krzysztof Zanussi
- Starring: Michał Żebrowski; Jan Frycz; Agnieszka Grochowska; Borys Szyc
- Release dates: September 15, 2004 (Gdynia); October 8, 2004 (Poland)
- Running time: 91 minutes
- Country: Poland
- Language: Polish

The Welts (Polish: Pręgi) is a 2004 Polish drama film by Magdalena Piekorz in her feature film directorial debut. It was Poland's submission to the 77th Academy Awards for the Academy Award for Best Foreign Language Film, but was not accepted as a nominee.

== Cast ==
- Michał Żebrowski as Wojciech Winkler
  - Waclaw Adamczyk as Wojciech Winkler (12 years)
- Jan Frycz as Andrzej Winkler
- Agnieszka Grochowska as Tania
- Borys Szyc as Bartosz
  - Alan Andersz as Bartosz (12 years)
- Leszek Piskorz as Priest
- Jan Peszek as Editor-In-Chief
- Tadeusz Bradecki as Doctor
- Mikołaj Grabowski as Doctor
- Maria Maj as Teacher
- Joanna Pierzak as Teacher
- Marcin Bosak

== Reception ==
Leslie Felperin of Variety commended the first half of the film, but wrote that the "second half considerably dilutes this good work."

== See also ==
- List of submissions to the 77th Academy Awards for Best Foreign Language Film
