= Kinga Preis =

Polish actress (born 1971)

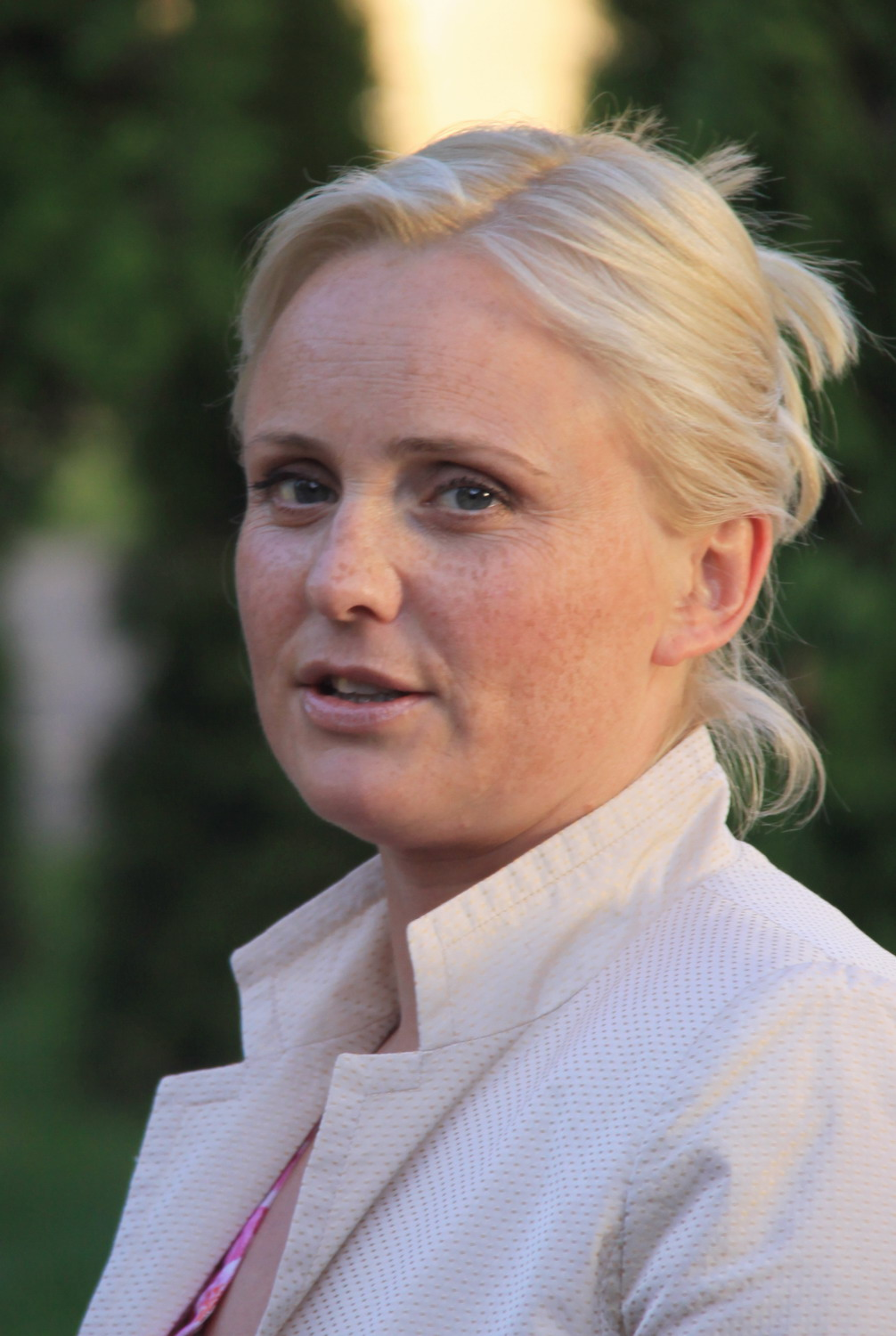
- Preis in 2010
- Born: 31 August 1971 (age 54); Wrocław, Poland
- Occupation: actress
- Years active: 1996-present
- Partner: Piotr Borowiec

Kinga Anna Preis (born 31 August 1971) is a Polish actress. She is six-time Polish Film Awards–winner: four times for Best Supporting Actress in Tuesday (2001), In Darkness (2011), The Mighty Angel (2014), and I Never Cry (2020), and two times for Best Actress in Silence (2001) and The Collector (2005). She also four-time Gdynia Film Festival-winner.

== Life and career ==
Preis was born in Wrocław and graduated from Ludwik Solski Academy for the Dramatic Arts in 1996. Her father was Austrian. In 1995 she joined Wrocław Polish Theatre and since then appeared in many stage productions. In 1997 she made her television debut starring in the comedy series, Room 107 and later big screen debut in the drama film Farba. In 1998, Preis received Gdynia Film Festival Award for Best Supporting Actress and Polish Academy Award for Best Supporting Actress nomination for Monday. In 1999 she starred in the historical drama film The Gateway of Europe receiving another Polish Academy Award nomination for Best Supporting Actress.

In 2000, Pries starred in the comedy-drama film, Tuesday, winning her first Polish Academy Award for Best Supporting Actress. The following year she won her first Polish Academy Award for Best Actress and Gdynia Film Festival Award for Best Actress for Silence. She won her second Polish Academy Award for Best Actress for starring in the 2005 drama film, The Collector. In 2006, she received the Zbigniew Cybulski Award for best young actress. She later starred in Four Nights with Anna (2008) and The Dark House (2009). Preis later received Best Supporting Actress Awards for performances in In Darkness (2011), The Mighty Angel (2014), and I Never Cry (2020).

On television, Preis was regular cast member in Removals (2000–01), Boza podszewka. Czesc druga (2005–06), Ja to mam szczęście! (2012), Blood for the Blood (2015), Pakt (2016), The Trap (2018), Our Century (2019–2020), Rysa (2021), Lead Children (2026) and most notable long-running drama series, Father Matthew (as of 2008). In 2020, she received Telekamery Award for Best Actress.

In 2010, Preis was decorated with Golden Cross of Merit. In 2011, she was awarded the Silver Medal for Merit to Culture – Gloria Artis.

== Filmography ==
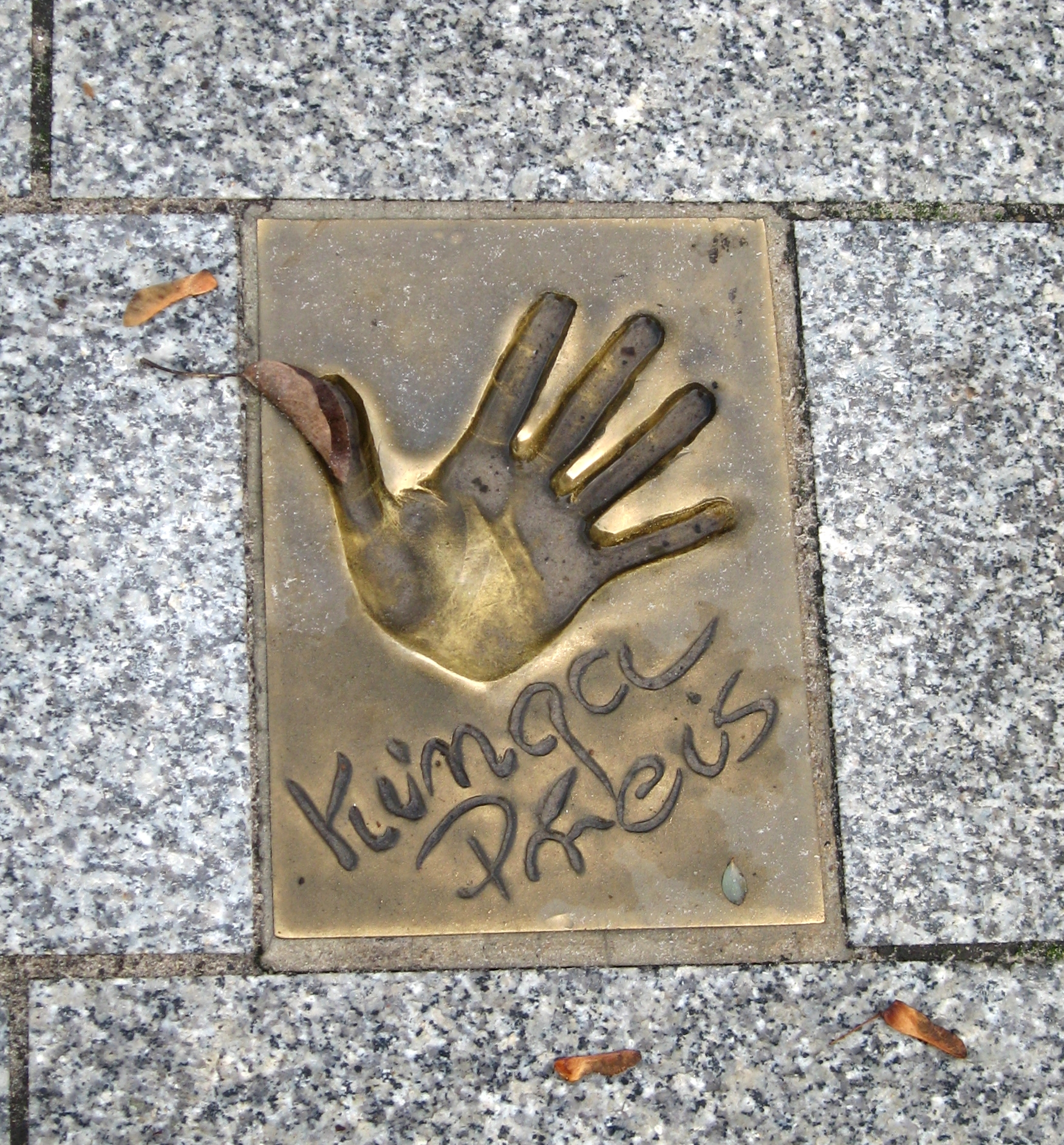
Preis Międzyzdroje Hall of Fame

Year	Title	Role	Notes
1997	Farba	Majka	
1998	Monday	Renata	Gdynia Film Festival Award for Best Supporting Actress; Nominated — Polish Academy Award for Best Supporting Actress
1999	The Gateway of Europe	Hala	Nominated — Polish Academy Award for Best Supporting Actress
2000	Dom Pirków	Pirks' mother	
2000	Tuesday	Renata	Polish Academy Award for Best Supporting Actress
2001	Silence	Magdalena "Mimi"	Polish Academy Award for Best Actress; Gdynia Film Festival Award for Best Actress
2003	Symmetry	Dawid's Wife	Nominated — Polish Academy Award for Best Supporting Actress
2004	Nigdy w zyciu!	Kinga	
2005	The Collector	Gosia Bednarek	Polish Academy Award for Best Actress; Gdynia Film Festival Award for Best Supporting Actress
2006	Fundacja	Kazia	
2006	Samotność w sieci	Iwona	
2006	Statycsi	Bożena Popławska-Ochman	Nominated — Polish Academy Award for Best Actress
2006	Co słonko widziało	Brunette	
2007	Louise's Garden	Anna Swiatek	
2008	Jeszcze raz	Grazyna	
2008	Four Nights with Anna	Anna	Nominated — Polish Academy Award for Best Actress
2008	Scratch	Zosia	
2009	Idealny facet dla mojej dziewczyny	Plesicowa	
2009	Włatcy móch: Ćmoki, czopki i mondzioły	Jowita	Voice
2009	The Dark House	Bożena Dziabasowa	Nominated — Polish Academy Award for Best Actress
2010	Joanna	Staszka Kopeć	Nominated — Polish Academy Award for Best Supporting Actress
2011	Suicide Room	Psychiatrist	
2011	Milion dolarów	Bożenka	
2011	Rose	Amelia	Nominated — Polish Academy Award for Best Supporting Actress
2011	In Darkness	Wanda Socha	Polish Academy Award for Best Supporting Actress
2014	The Mighty Angel	Mania	Polish Academy Award for Best Supporting Actress
2014	Gods	Ewka's Mother	Nominated — Polish Academy Award for Best Supporting Actress
2015	The Lure	the nightclub singer	Nominated — Polish Academy Award for Best Supporting Actress
2016	Wszystko gra	Roma	
2016	Prosta historia o morderstwie	Teresa	
2018	Plan B	Natalia	
2018	53 Wars	Krystyna	
2020	I Never Cry	Ola's Mother	Polish Academy Award for Best Supporting Actress
2021	Back Then	Elzbieta Makowska	
2022	The Silent Twins	Sister Nowak	
2022	Na chwile, na zawsze	Mother of Candy	
2022	Prawdziwe zycie aniolów	Agnieszka	
2023	Swieto ognia	Józefina	Gdynia Film Festival Award for Best Supporting Actress; Nominated — Polish Academy Award for Best Supporting Actress
2024	Wiecej	Joanna	
