= Prymas – trzy lata z tysiąca =

2000 film by Teresa Kotlarczyk

- Directed by: Teresa Kotlarczyk
- Written by: Jan Purzycki
- Produced by: Marian Terlecki
- Starring: Andrzej Seweryn; Maja Ostaszewska; Zbigniew Zamachowski; Krzysztof Wakuliński
- Cinematography: Piotr Wojtowicz
- Edited by: Grazyna Gradon
- Music by: Zygmunt Konieczny
- Production companies: Telewizja Polska; MT Art Prod. Wizja TV; AWR Wprost; Best Film; Grupa Atlas
- Release date: 10 September 2000 (Grand Theatre, Warsaw)
- Running time: 100 min.
- Country: Poland
- Language: Polish

Prymas – trzy lata z tysiąca (Primate – three years in a thousand) is a Polish historical film. It was released in 2000. Although not a reconstruction of historical facts of a Catholic primate, the film is based on Cardinal Stefan Wyszyński's Prison Notes and archival, extensive footage of him.

The film was shot between June 20 and August 5, 1999, in Warsaw and Lubiąż.

== Cast ==
- Andrzej Seweryn as Stefan Wyszynski
- Zbigniew Zamachowski as Priest Stanislaw Skorodecki
- Maja Ostaszewska as Sister Leonia
- Grzegorz Sikora
- Krzysztof Wakulinski as Colonel
- Mariusz Benoit as Kozyra
- Henryk Talar as Boleslaw Bierut
- Jerzy Trela
- Piotr Adamczyk as Kozyra's assistant
- Krzysztof Banaszyk
- Marek Bargielowski
- Krzysztof Bien as Guard
- Andrzej Blumenfeld as Herbert
- Józef Fryzlewicz
- Mariusz Jakus
- Arkadiusz Janiczek as Ubeck
- Marek Kalita
- Dorota Kwiatkowska as Madonna
