= The Debt (1999 film) =

- Directed by: Krzysztof Krauze
- Written by: Krzysztof Krauze; Jerzy Morawski
- Starring: Robert Gonera; Jacek Borcuch; Andrzej Chyra
- Release date: November 19, 1999
- Running time: 107 minutes
- Country: Poland
- Language: Polish

The Debt (Polish: Dług) is a 1999 Polish film directed by Krzysztof Krauze. It is based on a true event that took place in Warsaw, Poland in the early 1990s.

== Plot ==
After looking for financial backing to start a business importing Italian scooters, college friends Adam and Stefan meet businessman Gerard. While initially very helpful, Gerard soon turns violent, and begins to blackmail the pair for increasingly large sums of money while psychologically terrorizing the two men. Unable to find help from the police, the two men devise a plan to incapacitate Gerard by breaking his spine and intimidate his bodyguard. However, amidst a series of unfortunate events while realising this plan and driven by heightened emotions, Adam ends up killing Gerard first, followed by his bodyguard.

The movie is based on the true story of Sławomir Sikora and Artur Bryliński, who were later pardoned by the President of Poland because of exposure from the film.

== Critical reception ==
Critic Piotr Zwierzchowski compared Krauze's The Debt to Michael Haneke's Funny Games writing that both films are similar in that they convey the same sense of "powerlessness of the main characters as well as the viewers against the morality-defying spectacle of violence". Katarzyna Taras considered The Debt, alongside Robert Gliński's 2001 film Cześć Tereska, to be "the darkest portrayal of Poland's reality after 1989".

In 2000, the film received Polish Academy Award for Best Film. In 2019, Andrzej Chyra, who played one of the main characters in The Debt, received the Special Zbigniew Cybulski Award for Lifetime Achievement, the jury having emphasized in its verdict his role in Krzysztof Krauze's 1999 film.

== Cast ==
- Robert Gonera as Adam Borecki
- Jacek Borcuch as Stefan Kowalczyk
- Andrzej Chyra as Gerard Nowak
- Cezary Kosiński as Tadeusz Frei
- Joanna Szurmiej-Rzączyńska as Basia
- Agnieszka Warchulska as Jola
- Joanna Kurowska as Sasiadka
- Przemysław Modliszewski as Młody
- Krzysztof Gordon
- Sławomira Łozińska
- Maria Robaszkiewicz
- Edyta Bach as Joanna
- Jakub Bach as Jurek
- Jerzy Gudejko
- Henryk Gołębiewski
- Katarzyna Tatarak
- Marcin Jamkowski
- Ewa Kania
- Sławomir Jóźwik as Matczak
- Małgorzata Prażmowska
- Jowita Miondlikowska
- Jarosław Budnik
- Maria Maj
- Aleksander Mikołajczak
- Andrzej Andrzejewski
- Roman Bugaj
- Paweł Kleszcz

== See also ==
- Cinema of Poland
- List of Gdynia Film Festival winners
