= Life as a Fatal Sexually Transmitted Disease =

2000 Polish film

- Poster
- Życie jako śmiertelna choroba przenoszona drogą płciową
- Directed by: Krzysztof Zanussi
- Written by: Krzysztof Zanussi
- Produced by: Iwona Ziulkowska
- Starring: Zbigniew Zapasiewicz; Krystyna Janda; Tadeusz Bradecki
- Cinematography: Edward Klosinski
- Edited by: Marek Denys
- Music by: Wojciech Kilar
- Release date: 8 September 2000
- Running time: 105 minutes
- Countries: Poland, France
- Language: Polish

Life as a Fatal Sexually Transmitted Disease (Polish: Życie jako śmiertelna choroba przenoszona drogą płciową) is a 2000 Polish drama film directed by Krzysztof Zanussi. It was Poland's submission to the 73rd Academy Awards for the Academy Award for Best Foreign Language Film. The film won the Golden St. George at the 22nd Moscow International Film Festival.

== Cast ==
- Zbigniew Zapasiewicz as Tomasz Berg
- Krystyna Janda as Anna
- Tadeusz Bradecki as Monk Marek
- Monika Krzywkowska as Hanka
- Pawel Okraska as Filip
- Jerzy Radziwiłowicz as Starszy wioskowy
- Szymon Bobrowski as Karol
- Jerzy Nasierowski as assistant

== See also ==
- Cinema of Poland
- List of submissions to the 73rd Academy Awards for Best Foreign Language Film
