= Sir Thaddeus (1999 film) =

1999 Polish film

Sir Thaddeus, or the Last Lithuanian Foray
- French promotional poster for the film
- Polish: Pan Tadeusz, czyli ostatni zajazd na Litwie
- Directed by: Andrzej Wajda
- Written by: Andrzej Wajda; Jan Nowina-Zarzycki
- Based on: Pan Tadeusz by Adam Mickiewicz
- Produced by: Lew Rywin
- Starring: Bogusław Linda; Alicja Bachleda; Grażyna Szapołowska; Andrzej Seweryn; Michał Żebrowski; Marek Kondrat
- Cinematography: Paweł Edelman
- Edited by: Wanda Zeman; Anita Wandzel
- Music by: Wojciech Kilar
- Distributed by: Heritage Films; Canal+Polska; Les Films du Losange
- Release date: 22 October 1999
- Running time: 147 minutes
- Countries: Poland; France
- Language: Polish
- Budget: $5 million (estimated); 12,5 million złoty

Sir Thaddeus, or the Last Lithuanian Foray (Polish: Pan Tadeusz, czyli ostatni zajazd na Litwie), also simply known as Sir Thaddeus (Pan Tadeusz), is a 1999 film directed by Andrzej Wajda. It is based on the 1834 eponymous epic poem by Polish poet, writer and philosopher Adam Mickiewicz (1798–1855). As in the poem, conflict between the Soplica and Horeszko families serves as a backdrop for discussion of issues of Polish national unity and the struggle for independence.

== Historical background ==
For 400 years, Lithuania and Poland were united in the Polish–Lithuanian Commonwealth, until it was partitioned in 1795 by three neighbouring nations: the Russian Empire, the Kingdom of Prussia, and the Habsburg monarchy (see Partitions of Poland). At that point Poland, a formerly powerful state, simply ceased to exist. Yet one hope remained for the patriots yearning for autonomy – the First French Empire. Napoleon promised to restore the Polish homeland if Poles, in turn, helped him defeat the Russian Empire. Thousands of Poles and Lithuanians were part of the Grande Armée during the French invasion of Russia. The invasion force reached the gates of Moscow before being forced into a long and bloody retreat. The film itself centers on two noble families who live in the Russian-controlled part of Poland–Lithuania: the Horeszko family, who ardently favor independence, and the Soplica family, who support Russia.

== Synopsis ==
Pan Tadeusz is told in flashbacks as the author, Adam Mickiewicz, reads his work to a group of elderly exiles in Paris. The story takes place over the course of five days in 1811 and one day in 1812 in rolling landscapes of Lithuania. Not far off in history looms Napoleon's invasion of Russia, the prospect of which heartens Poles and Lithuanians yearning for liberation. But more immediately, the characters in Pan Tadeusz are feuding among themselves.

At odds are two families: the Soplicas and the Horeszkos. Their differences arise from a bloody night when the dashing Jacek Soplica (who was earlier rejected as a suitor for the old Count Horeszko's daughter), takes advantage of a Russian assault on the Count's castle to kill him. At that moment, the Count's faithful warden, Gervazy, vows vengeance for his master's death. Gervazy will not forgive and forget that in 1792, the last household lord of the Horeszkos was killed by Jacek Soplica and as a result, the latter was rewarded with the former's castle by the Russian colonizers.

20 years later, matters remain unresolved. Judge Soplica (Andrzej Seweryn), Jacek Soplica's brother, (who now lives in the castle of Count Horeszko), is locked in a lawsuit over the castle. A relative of the old murdered Count, young Count Horeszko (Marek Kondrat) has just arrived on the scene, as has 20-year-old Tadeusz Soplica (Michał Żebrowski), the Judge's nephew. He is soon smitten with the innocent Zosia (Alicja Bachleda), the teenage ward of his manipulative aunt, Telimena (Grażyna Szapołowska).

Preaching insurrection among the people is Priest Robak (Bogusław Linda), who carries more than a few secrets under his cowl. Robak informs the others that Napoleon is marching against the Russians and will be crossing the nearby Nemunas River. Naturally, the locals get intensely worked up over this news as they abhor their Russian overlords.

In the meantime, aunt Telimena, who is in charge of raising 14-year-old Zosia, begins a relationship with Tadeusz. This relationship does not please the rest of the family who expect Tadeusz to marry Zosia.

More reports arrive of the approach of Napoleon's army. It is said that Polish horsemen are coming with the French and will cross the Nemunas. At this time Tadeusz finds out that his father Jacek is still alive and that it was he who sent Priest Robak to his uncle to secure the marriage of Tadeusz and Zosia. Through this marriage, Jacek wishes to make amends for his past sins by restoring the land back to the Count. However, aunt Telimena (who is in love with Tadeusz herself) secretly wishes for Zosia to marry the wealthy Count.

When the Count attends a banquet given by the Soplica's family, Gervazy (the old Count's faithful warden) wreaks havoc by bringing up the old family dispute (namely Jacek Soplica killing old Count Horeszko). The Count and Tadeusz agree to settle their dispute with a duel. Meanwhile, it is revealed to the judge that Father Robak is actually Jacek Soplica. To take vengeance on the Soplica family, the Count and Gervazy head to the village of Dobrzyn to recruit some of the gentry to help destroy them. Vengeance is combined with the goal of starting an insurrection against the Russians. The recruited gentry along with the Count put the Soplicas under house arrest while Gervazy and his forces settle in the castle and make it the headquarters of the Count. The Russian soldiers intervene and capture all the rebels and make them prisoner. Nonetheless, the Soplica's supply weapons and free the rebels, which ultimately allows both Poles and Lithuanians to come together to fight the Russians. In the struggle, Jacek Soplica personally saves the lives of both the Count and Gervazy, for which the two men forgive Jacek Soplica for his past sins. Climactically, the Poles and Lithuanians win the battle, but many will have to leave their homes to avoid the wrath of the Russians.

As news is received that Napoleon has declared war on Russia, the Count and Tadeusz, forgetting their promised duel, head off to join the French troops marching against the Russians. As the story of Pan Tadeusz approaches the end, Count Horeszko and Tadeusz Soplica return as soldier heroes and both families (Soplicas and Horeszkos) celebrate and rejoice in peace as Tadeusz is betrothed to Zosia.

The film ends, as it began, with many of the protagonists, now émigrés in Paris, listening to Adam Mickiewicz as he reads from his poem about the homeland to which they cannot return.

== Cast ==
- Bogusław Linda – Jacek Soplica (pronounced [ˈjat͡sɛk sɔpˈlit͡sa]) alias Priest Robak, Bernardyn, father of Tadeusz Soplica, brother of Judge Soplica
- Michał Żebrowski – Tadeusz (Thaddeus) Soplica (pronounced [taˈdɛ.uʂ sɔpˈlit͡sa]), son of Jacek Soplica, 20-year-old nephew of Judge Soplica, in love with Zosia
- Alicja Bachleda-Curuś – Zosia Horeszko (pronounced [ˈzɔɕa xɔˈrɛʂkɔ]), 14-year-old orphan raised by Telimena
- Grażyna Szapołowska – Telimena Horeszko (pronounced [tɛliˈmɛna xɔˈrɛʂkɔ]), a distant relative of the Soplicas and of the Horeszkos, guardian of Zosia Horeszko, has won Polish Academy Award for Best Actress for the role.
- Andrzej Seweryn – Judge Soplica, younger brother of Jacek Soplica
- Marek Kondrat – Count Horeszko, a distant relative of the Horeszko family and the rightful owner of the castle
- Daniel Olbrychski – Gerwazy (pronounced [ɡɛrˈvazɨ]), the Warden, formerly a servant of the Horeszko family
- Krzysztof Kolberger – Adam Mickiewicz
- Sergey Shakurov – Rykow
- Jerzy Bińczycki – Maciej Królik-Rózeczka
- Jerzy Trela – Podkomorzy
- Jerzy Gralek – Wojski
- Marian Kociniak – Protazy
- Piotr Gąsowski – Rejent
- Andrzej Hudziak – Asesor
- Marek Perepeczko – Maciej Chrzciciel

== Box office performance ==
Pan Tadeusz was an overwhelming commercial success, but only in its domestic market. With more than 6 million tickets sold to its screenings in Poland, it was significant in allowing for the unprecedented domination of Polish box-office by domestic productions, together with With Fire and Sword, an exception in the history of the late 20th century Polish cinema. Pan Tadeusz did not do what Wajda's other films managed in the past; it was not successful internationally. While Wajda's Neo Realist trilogy of Pokolenie (A Generation) (1954), Kanał (Canal) (1957), and Popiół i diament (Ashes and Diamonds) (1958) was quoted as inspiration by, for instance, Martin Scorsese, and Wajda's diptych, Człowiek z marmuru (Man of Marble) (1976) and Człowiek z żelaza (Man of Iron) (1981), were hailed by Western European critics as among the better films from beyond the Iron Curtain, Pan Tadeusz's success was largely confined to Poland.

Pan Tadeusz played in eastern Europe during the latter half of 1999, featured at the Berlin Film Festival, and endured a limited, albeit financially unsuccessful, run in the US early in 2000.

== Soundtrack by Wojciech Kilar ==
The Polish film composer, Wojciech Kilar, wrote the score for Pan Tadeusz in addition to scores for over 100 films. The film contains a very popular polonaise composed by Kilar. He is better known internationally for his scores in Bram Stoker's Dracula, Death and the Maiden, The Portrait of a Lady, The Pianist, The Truman Show and The Ninth Gate. Kilar is also internationally known for his epic Exodus, which is famous as the trailer music from Schindler's List.

== Academy Award submission and awards ==
Pan Tadeusz was Poland's official Best Foreign Language Film submission at the 72nd Academy Awards, but did not manage to receive a nomination. Pan Tadeusz did however win awards at The Polish Film: Eagle award 2000. It won Best Film score, Best actress, Best Cinematography, Best Sound, Best Editing and Best Production Design. Andrzej Wajda won a Life Achievement Award at the same ceremony. Wajda also won an honorary Academy Award (Oscar statuette) in the same year for five decades of extraordinary film direction.
