= List of Polish films of the 2010s =

A list of films produced in Poland in the 2010s.

Title	Director	Cast	Genre	Notes
2010
The Woman That Dreamed About a Man	Per Fly	Sonja Richter, Marcin Dorociński, Mikael Nyqvist	Drama	
The Christening	Marcin Wrona	Tomasz Schuchardt, Wojciech Zieliński, Adam Woronowicz	Drama	
Silence	Sławomir Pstrong	Edyta Olszówka, Marcin Perchuć, Antoni Królikowski, Olga Frycz, Paweł Królikowski, Dawid Ogrodnik	Drama, Disaster	Set in 2003
Mother Teresa of Cats	Paweł Sala	Ewa Skibińska, Mariusz Bonaszewski, Mateusz Kościukiewicz, Filip Garbacz, Łukasz Simlat, Beata Fido	Drama	
Little Rose	Jan Kidawa-Błoński	Andrzej Seweryn, Magdalena Boczarska, Robert Więckiewicz, Jan Frycz, Jacek Braciak, Grażyna Szapołowska, Krzysztof Globisz, Władysław Kowalski	Drama	Set in 1967 to 1968
Flying Pigs	Anna Kazejak-Dawid	Paweł Małaszyński, Olga Bołądź, Piotr Rogucki, Karolina Gorczyca, Cezary Pazura, Agata Kulesza, Andrzej Grabowski, Przemysław Saleta	Drama, Action	
Maiden Vows	Filip Bajon	Robert Więckiewicz, Maciej Stuhr, Anna Cieślak, Edyta Olszówka, Marta Żmuda Trzebiatowska, Borys Szyc, Andrzej Grabowski, Daniel Olbrychski, Marian Opania, Lech Ordon, Marian Dziędziel	Costume comedy, Romance	based on the comedy of Aleksander Fredro of 1832
2011
4:13 do Katowic	Andrzej Stopa	Robert Więckiewicz, Mikołaj Woubishet, Weronika Borek, Ewa Kutynia	Drama, Thriller	awarded on New York Underground Film Festival
80 Million	Waldemar Krzystek	Filip Bobek	Drama, Action	Set in 1980 to 1982
Battle of Warsaw 1920	Jerzy Hoffman	Borys Szyc, Natasza Urbańska, Daniel Olbrychski	History	
In Darkness	Agnieszka Holland	Robert Więckiewicz, Benno Fürmann, Maria Schrader, Herbert Knaup	Drama	Set in 1941 to 1944
Listy do M.	Mitja Okorn	Roma Gąsiorowska, Maciej Stuhr, Piotr Adamczyk, Agnieszka Dygant, Paweł Małaszyński, Tomasz Karolak	Comedy, Romance	
Man, Chicks Are Just Different	Marek Koterski	Robert Więckiewicz, Adam Woronowicz, Małgorzata Bogdańska, Maciej Musiał, Elżbieta Romanowska	Comedy-drama	
Suicide Room	Jan Komasa	Jakub Gierszał, Roma Gąsiorowska, Agata Kulesza, Krzysztof Pieczyński	Drama	
Black Thursday	Antoni Krauze	Wojciech Pszoniak, Piotr Fronczewski, Witold Dębicki, Tomasz Ziętek	Drama, Action	Set in 1970
The Mole	Rafael Lewandowski	Borys Szyc, Marian Dziędziel, Wojciech Pszoniak, Bartłomiej Topa, Jerzy Janeczek	Drama	
The Mill and the Cross	Lech Majewski	Rutger Hauer, Michael York, Charlotte Rampling, Marian Makula	Drama, Action	inspired by Pieter Bruegel the Elder's 1564 painting The Procession to Calvary
Rose	Wojciech Smarzowski	Agata Kulesza, Marcin Dorociński, Edward Linde-Lubaszenko, Szymon Bobrowski, Jacek Braciak, Kinga Preis	Drama, Action	Set in 1945 to 1946
2012
Byc jak Kazimierz Deyna	Przemysław Bluszcz	Marcin Korcz, Przemysław Bluszcz, Sonia Bohosiewicz, Krzysztof Kiersznowski, Jerzy Trela, Małgorzata Socha	Comedy	
Hans Kloss. Stawka wieksza niz smierc	Patryk Vega	Tomasz Kot, Adam Woronowicz, Daniel Olbrychski	Action	
Kac Wawa	Łukasz Karwowski	Borys Szyc, Michał Żurawski, Antoni Pawlicki, Tomasz Karolak, Michał Milowicz	Comedy	
Walesa. Man of Hope	Andrzej Wajda	Robert Wieckiewicz	Biography	
Baby Blues	Katarzyna Rosłaniec	Danuta Stenka, Jan Frycz, Katarzyna Figura, Mateusz Kościukiewicz	Drama	
Aglaja (Aglaja - Life hangs on a hair's breadth)	Krisztina Deák	Babett Jávor, Piroska Móga, Eszter Ónodi	Biography, Drama	
2013
In the Name Of	Małgorzata Szumowska			Entered into the 63rd Berlin International Film Festival
Traffic Department	Wojciech Smarzowski	Bartłomiej Topa, Arkadiusz Jakubik, Jacek Braciak, Marcin Dorociński, Marian Dziędziel, Agata Kulesza, Maciej Stuhr, Adam Woronowicz, Andrzej Grabowski, Krzysztof Czeczot	Drama, Action	
Ida	Paweł Pawlikowski	Agata Kulesza, Agata Trzebuchowska, Dawid Ogrodnik, Joanna Kulig, Jerzy Trela	Drama	First Polish film to win an Academy Award for Best Foreign Language Film
The Closed Circuit	Ryszard Bugajski	Janusz Gajos, Kazimierz Kaczor, Marek Probosz	Action, Drama	
2014
The Last Supply Drop	Piotr Marcjasz	Kamil Soczowska, Jacek Komorowski, Filip Stachowiak		Live action adaption of Dying Light
Dzien dobry, kocham cie!	Ryszard Zatorski	Łukasz Garlicki, Maciej Musiał, Marian Dziędziel, Jacek Fedorowicz	Action, Comedy	
Jack Strong	Władysław Pasikowski	Marcin Dorociński, Maja Ostaszewska, Józef Pawłowski, Patrick Wilson	Action, Biography	about colonel Ryszard Kukliński
Stones for the Rampart	Robert Gliński	Danuta Stenka, Artur Żmijewski, Krzysztof Globisz, Andrzej Chyra, Marian Dziędziel, Olgierd Łukaszewicz	Drama, action	based on the eponymous novel by Aleksander Kamiński
Warsaw 44	Jan Komasa	Józef Pawłowski, Zofia Wichłacz, Maurycy Popiel, Tomasz Schuchardt	Drama, action	the film depicts the Warsaw Uprising in 1944
2015
These Daughters of Mine	Kinga Dębska		Comedy, Drama	
The Lure	Agnieszka Smoczynska		Comedy, Drama, Horror	
11 Minutes	Jerzy Skolimowski	Richard Dormer, Andrzej Chyra, Dawid Ogrodnik, Mateusz Kościukiewicz, Agata Buzek	Drama	screened in the main competition section of the 72nd Venice International Film Festival
The Red Spider	Marcin Koszałka	Filip Pławiak, Małgorzata Foremniak, Adam Woronowicz	Drama, thriller	
Inka. Zachowalam sie jak trzeba	Arkadiusz Gołębiewski		Documentary film	about Danuta Siedzikówna
Pilecki	Mirosław Krzyszkowski		Fictitious document	about captain Witold Pilecki
Karbala	Krzysztof Łukaszewicz	Bartłomiej Topa, Hristo Shopov, Leszek Lichota, Michał Żurawski, Tomasz Schuchardt, Zbigniew Stryj, Łukasz Simlat	Drama, action	Set in 2004 (Iraq)
2016
I'm a Killer	Maciej Pieprzyca	Arkadiusz Jakubik, Agata Kulesza, Piotr Adamczyk, Elżbieta Okupska	Crime	
Maria Skłodowska-Curie	Marie Noëlle		Biography, Drama	
Ostatnia rodzina	Jan P. Matuszyński	Andrzej Seweryn, Dawid Ogrodnik, Aleksandra Konieczna, Andrzej Chyra	Biography, Drama	
Planet Single	Mitja Okorn		Comedy	
Afterimage	Andrzej Wajda	Bogusław Linda	Drama	
Smoleńsk	Antoni Krauze	Halina Łabonarska, Jerzy Zelnik, Katarzyna Łaniewska, Dominika Figurska, Jan Pietrzak	Drama, Thriller	
The Innocents	Anne Fontaine	Lou de Laâge, Agata Buzek, Agata Kulesza, Vincent Macaigne	Drama	
Loving Vincent	Dorota Kobiela, Hugh Welchman	Douglas Booth, Jerome Flynn, Saoirse Ronan	Animated, Biography, Drama	
Volhynia	Wojciech Smarzowski	Michalina Łabacz, Jacek Braciak, Tomasz Sapryk	Drama	about Massacres of Poles in Volhynia and Eastern Galicia in 1943-1944
2017 - See List of Polish films of 2017
2018
2019
Corpus Christi	Jan Komasa	Bartosz Bielenia, Aleksandra Konieczna, Eliza Rycembel, Tomasz Zietek	Drama	

== See also ==
- List of Polish films of 2014
- List of Polish films of 2016
- List of Polish films of 2017
