= Polish Academy Award for Best Supporting Actor =

Annual Polish film award

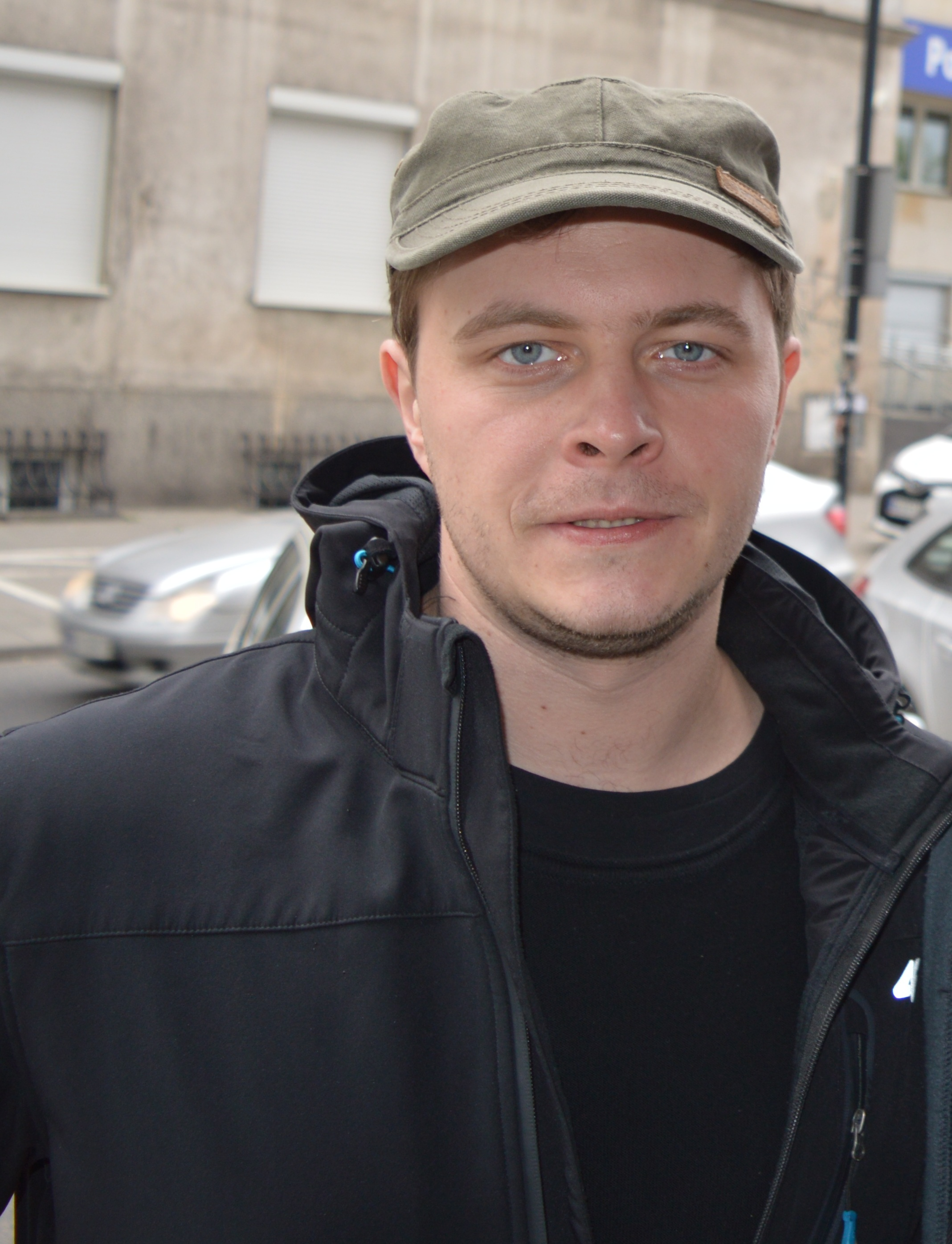
- 2024 recipient: Tomasz Schuchardt
- Awarded for: Best Performance by an Actor in a Supporting Role
- Presented by: Polish Film Academy
- First award: Andrzej Chyra; Dług (1999)
- Currently held by: Tomasz Schuchardt; Doppelgänger (2024)

The Polish Academy Award for Best Supporting Actor is an annual award given to the best Polish supporting actor of the year.

== Winners and nominees ==
Year	Actor	Movie title	Role
2000	Andrzej Chyra	Dług	Gerard Nowak
2000	Krzysztof Majchrzak	Amok	"Rekin" ("Shark")
2000	Janusz Gajos	Fuks	Śledczy Mazur
2000	Bohdan Stupka	Ogniem i mieczem	Bohdan Khmelnytsky
2000	Krzysztof Stroiński	Tydzień z życia mężczyzny	Oleś
2001	Janusz Gajos	To ja, złodziej	Roman Wyskocz
2001	Krzysztof Pieczyński	Daleko od okna	Jodła
2001	Zbigniew Zamachowski	Prymas - trzy lata z tysiąca	Stanisław Skordecki
2001	Franciszek Pieczka	Syzyfowe prace	Józef
2001	Jan Frycz	Zakochani	Alfred Bobicki
2002	Jerzy Trela	Quo Vadis	Chilon Chilonides
2002	Krzysztof Kiersznowski	Cześć, Tereska	Stasiek, Tereska's father
2002	Jan Frycz	Egoiści	Filip
2002	Maciej Stuhr	Przedwiośnie	Hipolit Wielosławski
2002	Zbigniew Zamachowski	Weiser	Kołota
2003	Jacek Braciak	Edi	Jureczek Sokołow
2003	Jerzy Trela	Anioł w Krakowie	Kloszard
2003	Ed Stoppard	Pianista	Henryk Szpilman
2003	Jan Frycz	Tam i z powrotem	Piotr Klimek vel Jurek
2003	Daniel Olbrychski	Zemsta	Dyndalski
2004	Jan Frycz	Pornografia	Siemian
2004	Sławomir Orzechowski	Warszawa	Jan Gołębiewski
2004	Zbigniew Zamachowski	Żurek	Matuszek
2005	Jan Frycz	Pręgi	Andrzej Winkler
2005	Borys Szyc	Symetria	Albert
2005	Arkadiusz Jakubik	Wesele	Jan Janocha
2005	Krzysztof Globisz	Zerwany	Teacher in youth detention center
2006	Jerzy Stuhr	Persona non grata	Solliciteur
2006	Marek Kondrat	Wróżby kumaka	Marczak
2006	Jerzy Trela	Zakochany Anioł	Kloszard "Szajbusek"
2007	Krzysztof Kiersznowski	Statyści	Edward Gralewski
2007	Adam Ferency	Jasminum	father Kleofas
2007	Andrzej Chyra	Wszyscy jesteśmy Chrystusami	Adaś Miauczyński (33 years old)
2008	Tomasz Sapryk	Sztuczki	Father of Stefek and Elka
2008	Artur Żmijewski	Katyń	rotmistrz Andrzej
2008	Jan Frycz	Korowód	professor Zdzisław Dąbrowski
2009	Robert Więckiewicz	Ile waży koń trojański?	Darek Albrecht
2009	Andrzej Hudziak	33 sceny z życia	Jurek Szczęsny
2009	Rafał Maćkowiak	33 sceny z życia	Tomek
2010	Janusz Gajos	Mniejsze zło	Mieczysław Nowak
2010	Robert Więckiewicz	Dom zły	prosecutor Tomala
2010	Adam Woronowicz	Rewers	Mr. Józef
2011	Adam Woronowicz	Chrzest	"Gruby" ("Fat")
2011	Jan Frycz	Różyczka	colonel Wasiak
2011	Andrzej Chyra	Wszystko, co kocham	Janek's father
2012	Jacek Braciak	Róża	Władek
2012	Adam Ferency	1920 Bitwa warszawska	chekist Bykowski
2012	Wojciech Pszoniak	Kret	Stefan Garbarek
2013	Arkadiusz Jakubik	Drogówka	Bogdan Petrycki
2013	Dawid Ogrodnik	Jesteś Bogiem	Sebastian Salbert "Rahim"
2013	Maciej Stuhr	Obława	Henryk Kondolewicz
2014	Arkadiusz Jakubik	Chce się żyć	Paweł Rosiński
2014	Eryk Lubos	Dziewczyna z szafy	Dzielnicowy Krzysztof
2014	Adam Woronowicz	Miłość	Adam Kostrzewski
2015	Piotr Głowacki	Bogowie	Marian Zembala
2015	Ireneusz Czop	Jack Strong	Marian Rakowiecki
2015	Adam Woronowicz	Pani z przedszkola	Hubert Myśliwski
2015	Arkadiusz Jakubik	Pod Mocnym Aniołem	"Terrorysta" ("Terrorist")
2016	Wojciech Pszoniak	Excentrycy, czyli po słonecznej stronie ulicy	Felicjan Zuppe
2016	Adam Woronowicz	Demon	Doctor
2016	Marcin Dorociński	Moje córki krowy	Grzegorz
2017	Arkadiusz Jakubik	Jestem mordercą	Wiesław Kalicki
2017	Jacek Braciak	Volhynia	Głowacki
2017	Dawid Ogrodnik	Ostatnia rodzina	Tomasz Beksiński
2018	Arkadiusz Jakubik	Cicha noc	Adam's Father
2018	Arkadiusz Jakubik	Najlepszy	swimming pool manager
2018	Tomasz Ziętek	Cicha noc	Paweł
2019	Janusz Gajos	Kler	Archbishop Mordowicz
2019	Adam Woronowicz	Kamerdyner	Hermann von Krauss
2019	Borys Szyc	Zimna wojna	Lech Kaczmarek
2020	Łukasz Simlat	Boże Ciało	Father Tomasz
2020	Robert Więckiewicz	Ukryta gra	Alfred
2020	Tomasz Ziętek	Boże Ciało	Pinczer
2020	Andrzej Chyra	Mowa ptaków	Lucjan
2020	Sebastian Stankiewicz	Pan T.	Filak
2021	Jan Frycz	25 lat niewinności. Sprawa Tomka Komendy	Stary
2021	Andrzej Konopka	25 lat niewinności. Sprawa Tomka Komendy	Toloczko
2021	Maciej Stuhr	Sala samobójców. Hejter	Paweł Rudnicki
2021	Andrzej Chyra	Śniegu już nigdy nie będzie	Captain
2021	Łukasz Simlat	Śniegu już nigdy nie będzie	Wika's husband
2022	Jacek Braciak	Żeby nie było śladów	Tadeusz Popiel
2022	Andrzej Chyra	Wszystkie nasze strachy	Daniel's father
2022	Łukasz Simlat	Sonata	Łukasz Plonka
2022	Borys Szyc	Bo we mnie jest seks	Kazimierz Kutz
2022	Adam Woronowicz	Moje wspaniałe życie	Maciek
2023	Andrzej Seweryn	Śubuk	Feliks
2023	Sebastian Fabijański	Apokawixa	Blitz
2023	Grzegorz Damięcki	Fucking Bornholm	Dawid Nowak
2023	Andrzej Konopka	Chrzciny	Reverend Wiesław
2023	Mateusz Kościukiewicz	IO	Mateo
2024	Tomasz Schuchardt	Doppelgänger. Sobowtór	Jan Bitner
2024	Robert Więckiewicz	Filip	Staszek
2024	Jacek Braciak	Kos	Tadeusz Kościuszko
2024	Robert Więckiewicz	Kos	Dunin
2024	Piotr Pacek	Kos	Stanisław Duchnowski
2025	Andrzej Chyra	Kulej. Dwie strony medalu	Feliks Stamm
2025	Kieran Culkin	Prawdziwy ból	Benjamin "Benji" Kaplan
2025	Jakub Gierszał	Biała odwaga	Andrzej
2025	Julian Świeżewski	Biała odwaga	Maciej
2025	Zdzisław Wardejn	Cisza nocna	Edward

== Multiple awards and nominations ==
Wins	Actor	Nominations
4	Jacek Braciak	1
3	Jan Frycz	4
3	Arkadiusz Jakubik	3
2	Robert Więckiewicz	1
