= Polish Academy Audience Award =

Annual Polish film award

The Polish Academy Audience Award is an annual award given by audience to the best Polish film of the year.

== Winners ==
Year	English title	Original title	Director
2002	Hi Tessa	Cześć, Tereska	Robert Gliński
2003	Edi	Edi	Piotr Trzaskalski
2004	Squint Your Eyes	Zmruż oczy	Andrzej Jakimowski
2005	The Wedding	Wesele	Wojciech Smarzowski
2006	The Collector	Komornik	Feliks Falk
2007	Jasminum	Jasminum	Jan Jakub Kolski
2008	Tricks	Sztuczki	Andrzej Jakimowski
2009	33 Scenes from Life	33 sceny z życia	Małgorzata Szumowska
2010	The Dark House	Dom zły	Wojciech Smarzowski
2011	All That I Love	Wszystko co kocham	Jacek Borcuch
2012	Rose	Róża	Wojciech Smarzowski
2013	You Are God	Jesteś Bogiem	Leszek Dawid
2014	Life Feels Good	Chce się żyć	Maciej Pieprzyca
2015	Gods	Bogowie	Łukasz Palkowski
2016	These Daughters of Mine	Moje córki krowy	Kinga Dębska
2017	Hatred	Wołyń	Wojciech Smarzowski
2018	Silent Night	Cicha noc	Piotr Domalewski
2019	Clergy	Kler	Wojciech Smarzowski
2020	Corpus Christi	Boże ciało	Jan Komasa
2021	The Hater	Sala samobójców. Hejter	Jan Komasa
2022	The Wedding	Wesele	Wojciech Smarzowski
2023	Johnny	Johnny	Daniel Jaroszek
2024	The Peasants	Chłopi	Dorota Kobiela Hugh Welchman
