= The Eastern Gate =

Polish television series

- Max English-language poster
- Polish: Przesmyk
- Genre: Suspense thriller
- Directed by: Jan P. Matuszyński
- Starring: Lena Góra; Bartłomiej Topa; Andrzej Konopka; Karol Pocheć
- Music by: Stefan Wesołowski
- Country of origin: Poland
- Original languages: Polish; Russian
- No. of series: 1
- No. of episodes: 6

Production
- Cinematography: Kacper Fertacz
- Running time: 41–54 minutes
- Production company: TVN Warner Bros. Discovery

Original release
- Network: Max
- Release: 31 January 2025 – present

The Eastern Gate (Polish: Przesmyk, lit. 'Corridor') is a Polish suspense thriller television series. The first season was released on Max on 31 January 2025.

== Premise ==
Ewa Oginiec, a veteran Polish intelligence officer suffering from occupational burnout, is set to retire before learning that her lover, a fellow agent, has gone missing on an undercover assignment investigating Russian military activity in the region. She agrees to replace him in exchange for her superiors agreeing to help find him. The title refers to the Suwałki Gap, a strategic NATO area around the Polish-Lithuanian border.

== Cast ==
- Lena Góra as Ewa Oginiec
- Bartłomiej Topa as Krzysztof Hałaj
- Andrzej Konopka as Zbigniew Lange
- Karol Pocheć as Skiner
- Ewelina Starejki as Helena Jankulowska
- Leszek Lichota as Tadeusz Lemański
- Kamila Urzędowska as Inka Nawrot
- Piotr Żurawski as Błażej
- Tomasz Ziętek as Jan Drawicz
- Eliza Rycembel as Maria Drawicz
- Alona Szostak as Tamara Sorokina
- Aleh Garbuz as Nikolaj Sorokin, Tamara's husband
- Dariusz Chojnacki as Lieutenant Adamus
- Antoni Sztaba as Kaj
- Artur Paczesny as Olaf Klemensiewicz
- Dmytro Malkov as Skopincew
- Lidia Sadowa as Paulina Oginiec
- Michał Sikorski as Jasiek
- Zbigniew Stryj as Dedra-Łęcki
- Jan Englert as Minister
- Piotr Pacek as Michał
- Magdalena Walach as Maria Niedźwiecka
- Sergei Abolomov as Generał Kozłow
- Mirosław Zbrojewicz as Paweł Niedźwiecki
- Andrew Zhuravsky as Aleksiej Sorokin

== Episodes ==
No.	Title	Duration	Original release date
1	"Episode One"	48 min	31 January 2025
2	"Episode Two"	54 min	7 February 2025
3	"Episode Three"	43 min	14 February 2025
4	"Episode Four"	41 min	21 February 2025
5	"Episode Five"	50 min	28 February 2025
6	"Episode Six"	50 min	7 March 2025

== Production ==
The first season was shot in and around Gliwice, Sosnowiec, Katowice, Kraków, Zakopane, and Warsaw. Production on the second season began in early February 2026.

== Release ==
The series' first promotional image was released in on 2 May 2024. A teaser trailer was released on 24 October 2024. The first season was released on 31 January 2025. On 24 March 2025, it was announced that the series had been renewed for a second season.

== Accolades ==
Award	Year	Category	Result	Ref.
Polish Film Awards	2026	Best TV Series	Nominated	
