= Iwona Bielska =

Polish actress (born 1952)

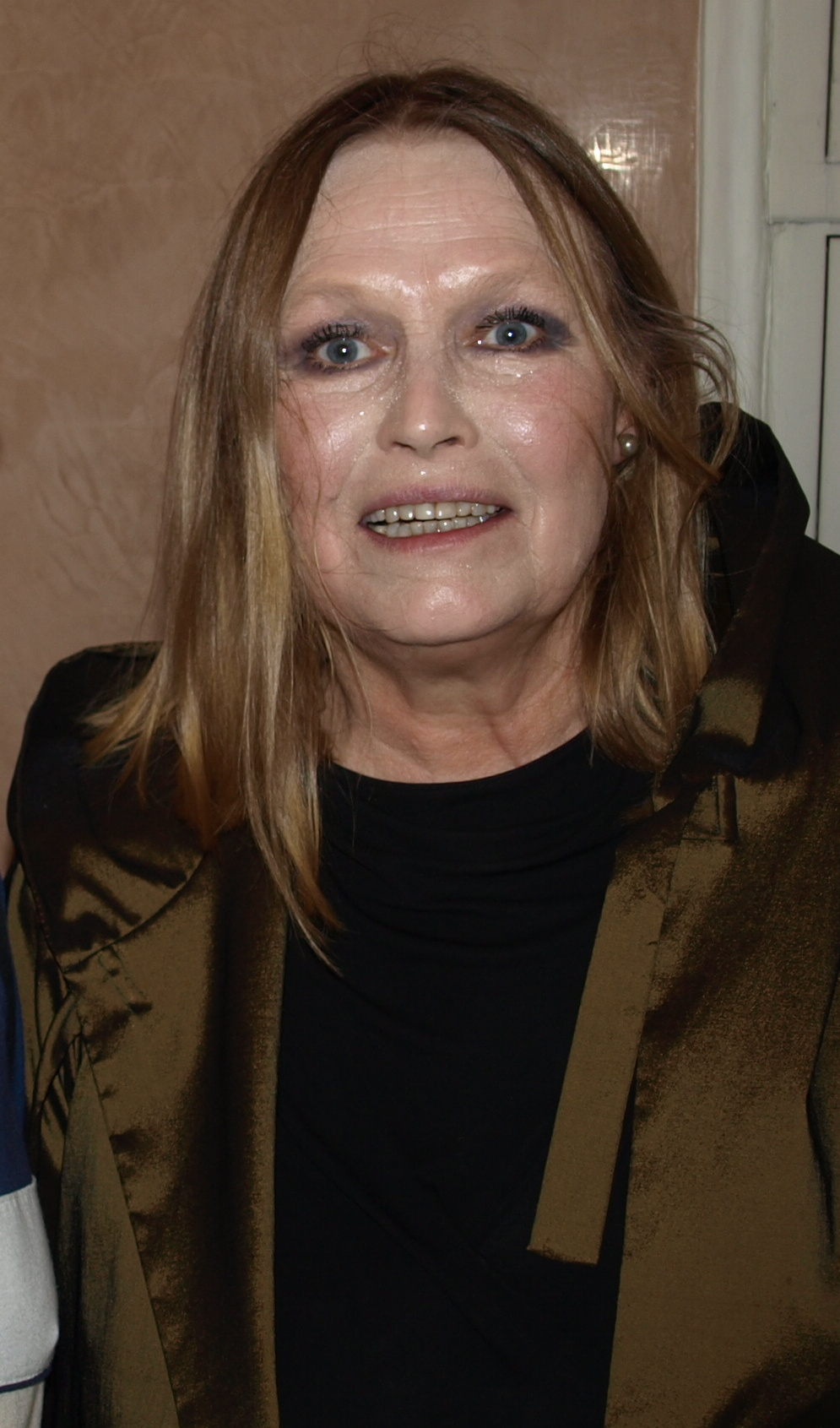
- Bielska in 2015
- Born: 7 September 1952 (age 73); Łódź, Poland
- Occupation: Actress
- Years active: 1977–present
- Spouse: Mikołaj Grabowski

Iwona Bielska (born September 7, 1952) is a Polish actress. She received Polish Academy Award for Best Supporting Actress for her performance in the 2004 comedy-drama film The Wedding.

== Life and career ==
Bielska was born in Łódź, Poland and in 1977 graduated from the AST National Academy of Theatre Arts in Kraków. The same year she made her stage debut. On screen, Bielska made her debut the following year and during the 1980s starred in films The Moth (1980), Homefront (1982), She-Wolf (1983), Window (1983), On the Silver Globe (1988) and What Do the Tigers Like (1989). In 1990s she mostly worked on stage, making single film appearance in the 1995 comedy-drama Colonel Kwiatkowski playing a supporting role.

In 2004, Bielska starred in the comedy-drama film, The Wedding directed by Wojciech Smarzowski. The role gained her Polish Academy Award for Best Supporting Actress as nomination for a Golden Duck Award. She later appeared in films include The Christening (2010), Wałęsa: Man of Hope (2013), The Mighty Angel (2014), A Grain of Truth (2015), Disco Polo (2015), (The Lure (2015), Mug (2017), The Plagues of Breslau (2018), Clergy (2018), and the internationally produced My Name Is Sara (2019) and Treasure (2024).

On television, Bielska was regular cast member on Adam and Ewa (2000–2001), Aida (2011), Recipe For Life (2011–2013), Blood for the Blood (2012–2015), Baron24 (2014), Na dobre i na złe (2016–2019), Our Century (2019) and Klara (2024). She also made guest appearances on Tatort, Magda M., Hela w opalach and Niania.
