= List of Polish films of 2016 =

The Polish film industry produced over one hundred feature films in 2016. This article fully lists all non-pornographic films, including short films, that had a release date in that year and which were at least partly made by Polish. It does not include films first released in previous years that had release dates in 2016. Also included is an overview of the major events in Polish film, including film festivals and awards ceremonies, as well as lists of those films that have been particularly well received, both critically and financially.

== Major releases ==
Opening		Title	Cast and Crew	Studio	Genre(s)	Ref.
J A N U A R Y	13	I, Olga Hepnarová	Director: Tomáš Weinreb; Petr Kazda; Cast: Michalina Olszańska	Outsider Pictures	Biography	
F E B R U A R Y	5	Planet Single	Director: Mitja Okorn; Cast: Maciej Stuhr, Agnieszka Więdłocha	Gigant Films	Comedy	
F E B R U A R Y	15	United States of Love	Director: Tomasz Wasilewski; Cast: Julia Kijowska	Mañana / Common Ground Pictures	Drama	
F E B R U A R Y	19	On the Border	Director: Wojciech Kasperski; Cast: Andrzej Chyra, Marcin Dorociński, Andrzej Grabowski	Metro Films	Thriller	
F E B R U A R Y	26	Sevens Things You Don't Know About Men	Director: Kinga Lewińska; Cast: Kacper Szymański, Piotr Wereśniak	MTL Maxfilm	Comedy	
M A R C H	3	Maria Skłodowska-Curie	Directors: Marie Noëlle; Cast: Karolina Gruszka, Charles Berling	Kino Świat	Biography, Drama	
M A Y	6	All Right	Director: Agnieszka Glińska; Cast: Stanisława Celińska, Kinga Preis, Eliza Rycembel	Scorpio Studio	Musical	
M A Y	24	Maanam być pięknie	Director: Wojciech Mosiejczuk; Cast:	Kamiling Co / Warner Music Poland / Rendeer	Documentary	
J U N E	6	Love	Director: Marta Plucińska; Cast: Olga Bołądź, Roma Gąsiorowska,	Federico Film	Comedy, Romance	
A U G U S T	26	Red Captain	Director: Michal Kollar; Cast: Maciej Stuhr	Fog’n’Desire Films / Sokol Kollár / Mental Disorder 4	Crime, Drama	
S E P T E M B E R	9	Smoleńsk	Director: Antoni Krauze; Cast: Beata Fido	Fundacja „Smoleńsk 2010”	Drama, Thriller	
S E P T E M B E R	10	Afterimage	Director: Andrzej Wajda; Cast: Bogusław Linda	Akson Studio	Biography, Drama	
S E P T E M B E R	16	Servants of God	Director: Mariusz Gawryś; Cast: Bartłomiej Topa, Julia Kijowska, Małgorzata Foremniak	Agora SA / Odra Film / Prasa i Film	Criminal	
S E P T E M B E R	30	The Last Family	Director: Jan P. Matuszyński; Cast: Andrzej Seweryn, Dawid Ogrodnik, Aleksandra Konieczna, Andrzej Chyra	Aurum Film / HBO Europe / Lightcraft	Biography, Drama, Thriller	
O C T O B E R	10	Hatred	Director: Wojciech Smarzowski; Cast: Michalina Łabacz, Vasyl Vasylyk	Film It See	Drama, History	
N O V E M B E R	7	Behind the Blue Door	Director: Mariusz Palej; Cast: Dominik Kowalczyk, Ewa Błaszczyk, Magdalena Nieć, Michał Żebrowski, Teresa Lipowska, Adam Ferency, Justyna Sieńczyłło, Marcel Sabat	TFB / AB Film Production / AlienFX / Dreamsound Studio	Adventure, Family, Fantasy	
N O V E M B E R	11	I'm a Killer	Director: Maciej Pieprzyca; Cast: Mirosław Haniszewski, Arkadiusz Jakubik, Agata Kulesza	RE Studio	Criminal, Thriller	
