= The King of Warsaw =

Polish crime series

- Polish: Król
- Genre: Drama
- Based on: The King of Warsaw by Szczepan Twardoch
- Written by: Łukasz M. Maciejewski; Dana Łukasińska; Szczepan Twardoch
- Directed by: Jan P. Matuszyński
- Starring: Michał Żurawski; Arkadiusz Jakubik; Magdalena Boczarska; Borys Szyc
- Country of origin: Poland
- Original language: Polish
- No. of seasons: 1
- No. of episodes: 8

Production
- Running time: 58–70 minutes
- Production companies: Canal+; Aurum Film

Original release
- Network: Canal+
- Release: 6 November – 25 December 2020

The King of Warsaw (Polish: Król, lit. 'King') is a Polish crime series directed by Jan P. Matuszyński, based on a 2016 novel of the same name by Szczepan Twardoch. It was produced at the request of Canal+, and premiered on November 6, 2020.

== Premise ==
Jews and anti-semites. Gangsters and boxers. Street fights and political intrigues. 1937. Warsaw is the arena of power struggles between various political factions. A conspiracy at the height of power may change the face of the capital and the entire Second Polish Republic. The city is shaken by a gang led by a Polish socialist Jan Kaplica. One of the leading members is a Jewish boxer, Jakub Szapiro, who dreams of replacing Kaplica and becoming the king of Warsaw. The specter of fascism hangs over Europe.

== Cast ==
- Michał Żurawski as Jakub Szapiro
- Lena Góra as Anna Ziembińska
- Arkadiusz Jakubik as Jan "Kum" Kaplica
- Magdalena Boczarska as Ryfka Kij
- Borys Szyc as Janusz Radziwiłek
- Kacper Olszewski as Mosze Bernsztajn
- Adam Bobik as Bronisław Żwirski
- Andrzej Seweryn as the prosecutor Jerzy Ziembiński
- Piotr Pacek as Andrzej Ziembiński
- Paweł Wolak as Pantaleon Karpinski
- Barbara Jonak as Stanisława Tabaczyńska
- Adam Ferency as Prime Minister Felicjan Sławoj Składkowski
- Bartłomiej Topa as Litwińczuk, secretary of Prime Minister Sławoj Składkowski
- Krzysztof Pieczyński as Colonel Adam Koc
- Andrzej Szeremeta as Marshal Edward Śmigły-Rydz
- Aleksandra Pisula as Emilia, Jakub Szapira's partner
- Piotr Żurawski as Moryc Szapiro, Jakub's brother
- Masza Wągrocka as Zosia, Moryc Szapira's fiancée
- Mikołaj Kubacki as Edward Tiutczew "Eduardo"
- Andrzej Kłak as Munja Weber, the chauffeur of "Kuma"
- Julia Lewenfisz-Górka as Magda Aszer, Mosze Bernsztajn's girlfriend
- Janusz Gajos
- Anna Nehrebecka
- Jacek Braciak
- Szczepan Twardoch
- Dawid Podsiadło as a friend of Emilia

== Episodes ==
No.	Title	Directed by	Written by	Original release date
1	"Part 1"	Jan P. Matuszyński	Szczepan Twardoch	November 6, 2020
2	"Part 2"	Jan P. Matuszyński	Dana Łukasińska	November 13, 2020
3	"Part 3"	Jan P. Matuszyński	Szczepan Twardoch	November 20, 2020
4	"Part 4"	Jan P. Matuszyński	Łukasz M. Maciejewski	November 27, 2020
5	"Part 5"	Jan P. Matuszyński	Dana Łukasińska	December 5, 2020
6	"Part 6"	Jan P. Matuszyński	Łukasz M. Maciejewski	December 11, 2020
7	"Part 7"	Jan P. Matuszyński	Łukasz M. Maciejewski	December 18, 2020
8	"Part 8"	Jan P. Matuszyński	Szczepan Twardoch	December 25, 2020

== Production ==
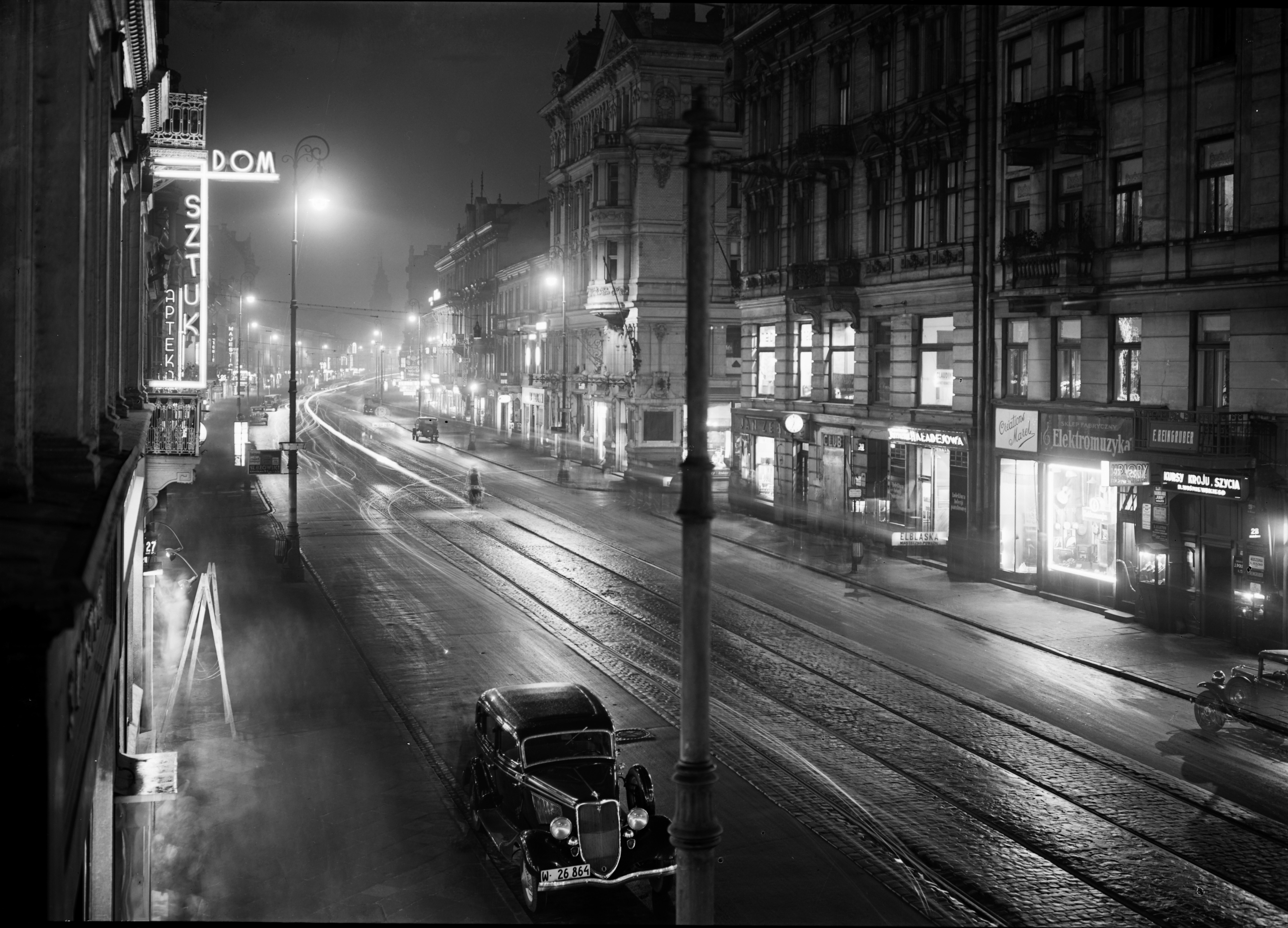
Nowy Świat Street in Warsaw, 1930s

The shooting period lasted from April to October 1, 2019. Locations of the film set: Warsaw, Modlin, Konstancin, Milanówek, Łódź (the intersection of Piotrkowska and Roosevelta streets, the intersection of Żeromskiego and Próchnika streets, the Reicher synagogue).

The plot of the series intertwines both existing and fictional characters, but inspired by real ones. Real politicians from the times of the Second Polish Republic (mainly Sanacja) include Prime Minister Felicjan Sławoj Składkowski, Marshal Edward Śmigły-Rydz and Colonel Adam Koc. Jakub Szapiro is inspired by pre-war light weight boxer Szapsel Rotholc, for some time a leading player of Makabi Warsaw.

== See also ==
- Peaky Blinders (TV series)
- Babylon Berlin
