= Dąbal =

- Pronunciation: Polish pronunciation: [ˈdɔmbal]

Origin
- Language: Polish
- Meaning: derived from "oak"
- Region of origin: Poland

Other names
- See also: Dabal, Dombal, Dybal, Dybala

Dąbal (Polish pronunciation: [ˈdɔmbal]; plural: Dąbalowie) is a Polish-language surname. Dąbal surname is derived from the word dąb, meaning "oak", with several meanings. Notable people with the surname include:

- Franciszek Dąbal (1920–1989), Polish politician
- Michał Dąbal (born 1985), Polish music producer
- Tadeusz Dąbal (Theodore L. Dobol, 1915 – 1996), United States Army non-commissioned officer of Polish-American origin
- Tomasz Dąbal (1890–1937), Polish politician
- Wit Dąbal (born 1955), Polish cinematographer

== Fictional characters ==
- Bartłomiej Topa played the character of Krzysztof Dąbal in the film Wyjazd integracyjny

== See also ==
- Dąbale
