= Dybal =

Dybal or Dybał is a surname of West Slavic origin, e.g. from Polish dybać 'to lurk', from Proto-Slavic *dybati. Notable people with the surname include:

- Bruno Dybal (born 1994), Brazilian footballer
- Jurek Dybał (born 1977), Polish conductor

== See also ==
- Dąbal
- Dybala
