= The Wedding (2004 film) =

- Original title: Wesele
- Directed by: Wojciech Smarzowski
- Written by: Wojciech Smarzowski
- Produced by: Anna Iwaszkiewicz; Dariusz Pietrykowski; Bartłomiej Topa
- Starring: Marian Dziędziel; Iwona Bielska; Tamara Arciuch; Maciej Stuhr; Bartłomiej Topa; Paweł Wilczak; Arkadiusz Jakubik; Jerzy Rogalski; Elżbieta Jarosik; Lech Dyblik; Tomasz Sapryk
- Cinematography: Andrzej Szulkowski
- Edited by: Paweł Laskowski
- Music by: Tymon Tymański
- Release dates: 15 October 2004 (Poland); 14 December 2007 (United Kingdom)
- Running time: 105 minutes
- Country: Poland
- Language: Polish
- Box office: $701,000

The Wedding (Polish: Wesele) is a 2004 Polish dark comedy film directed by Wojciech Smarzowski. It is about a traditional Polish wedding where the characters except for the bride are preoccupied with either money or sex, and in an inebriated state characters such as Wojnar, the bride's father, also perform lewd acts at the wedding. The film also features mild violence as scenes such as beating up a cameraman can be also seen in the wedding.

== Plot ==
The movie opens with the wedding of Janusz and Kasia. The father of the bride, Wieslaw Wojnar, gives Janusz a brand-new-looking Audi.

However, during the traditional, extravagant wedding feast, it is revealed that Wojnar bought Janusz the car as a bribe to marry Kasia, as she is pregnant. Wojnar has to pay several people off so that the wedding celebration can proceed smoothly. This includes securing a plot of land from his father-in-law, who is spending a lot of time in the men's room.

One of Kasia's old lovers is hired to videotape the wedding ceremony, but he's not interested in getting money out of Wojnar, as the others are. Eventually, Wojnar's situation gets worse and worse, as he has to bribe police officers and a notary public over the course of the long, drunken evening.

== Cast ==
- Marian Dziędziel as Wojnar, Kasia's father
- Iwona Bielska as Eluśka, Kasia's mother
- Tamara Arciuch as Kasia
- Bartłomiej Topa as Janusz, Kasia's husband
- Maciej Stuhr as Cameraman Mateusz
- Wojciech Skibiński as Wincenty Mróz, Eluśka's dad and Kasia's grandfather
- Paweł Wilczak as brother to the priest and a gangster
- Andrzej Beja-Zaborski as Adam, the priest
- Lech Dyblik as uncle Edek Wąs
- Jerzy Rogalski as uncle Mundek
- Agnieszka Matysiak as aunt Hela
- Tomasz Sapryk as sergent Styś
- Arkadiusz Jakubik as notary Jan Janocha
- Pawel Gędłek as Ciapara
- Andrzej Mastalerz as policeman Trybus
- Robert Wabich as Godfather

== Awards ==
The director won the Eagle at the Polish Film Awards, the East of West Award - Special Mention at the Karlovy Vary International Film Festival and the Youth Jury Award - Special Mention at Locarno International Film Festival, while as writer he won the Best Script award at the Warsaw International Film Festival. Marian Dziedziel (Wojnar) won the Audience Award and the Eagle at the Polish Film Awards.
