= Bartłomiej Topa =

Polish actor (born 1967)

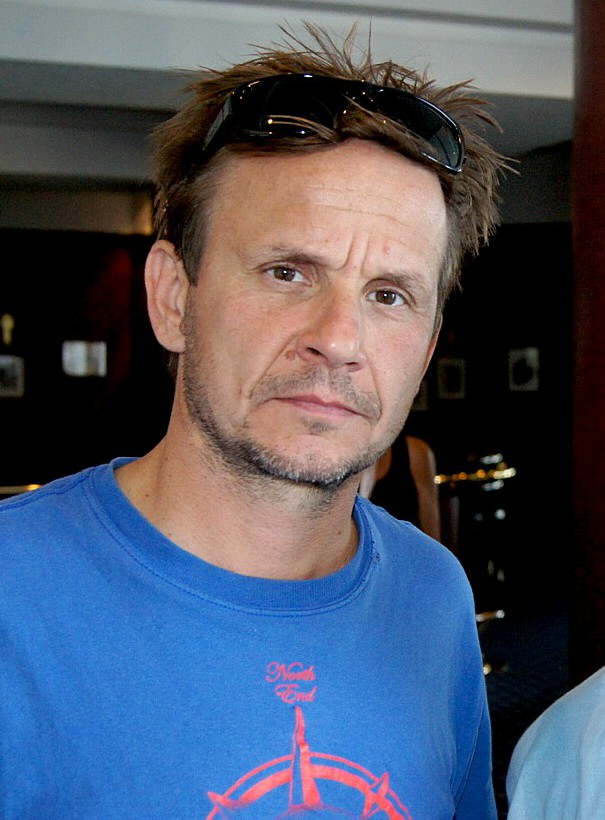
- Topa in 2013
- Born: 26 May 1967 (age 59); Nowy Targ, Poland
- Education: Łódź Film School
- Occupation: Actor
- Years active: 1990–present

Bartłomiej Filip Topa (born 26 May 1967) is a Polish actor. He appeared in more than 100 films and television series since 1990.

== Life and career ==
Topa was born in Nowy Targ. In 1991 he graduated from the Łódź Film School and later began appearing in theatre productions. He made his screen debut appearing in the 1990 drama film, The Bet directed by Teresa Kotlarczyk, and later starred in the horror film November by Łukasz Karwowski. Topa later appeared in films Three Colours: White (1993), Crows (1994) and Demons of War (1998). From 1999 to 2006, Topa starred in the TVP2 drama series, Złotopolscy. In 2004 he starred in the black comedy film, The Wedding directed by Wojciech Smarzowski.

During the 2000s and 2010s, Topa mostly played supporting roles in both film and television. For playing the leading role in the 2013 crime film, Traffic Department, he received a Polish Film Award nomination for Best Actor. He later appeared in the films The Mighty Angel (2014), Karbala (2015) and Clergy (2018). From 2014 to 2017, Topa starred in the HBO Europe crime drama series, The Border. He also starred in Ultraviolet (2017–19), The King of Warsaw (2020), Hold Tight (2022) and The Convict (2021–23).

In 2023, Topa went to star in the Netflix comedy series, 1670.

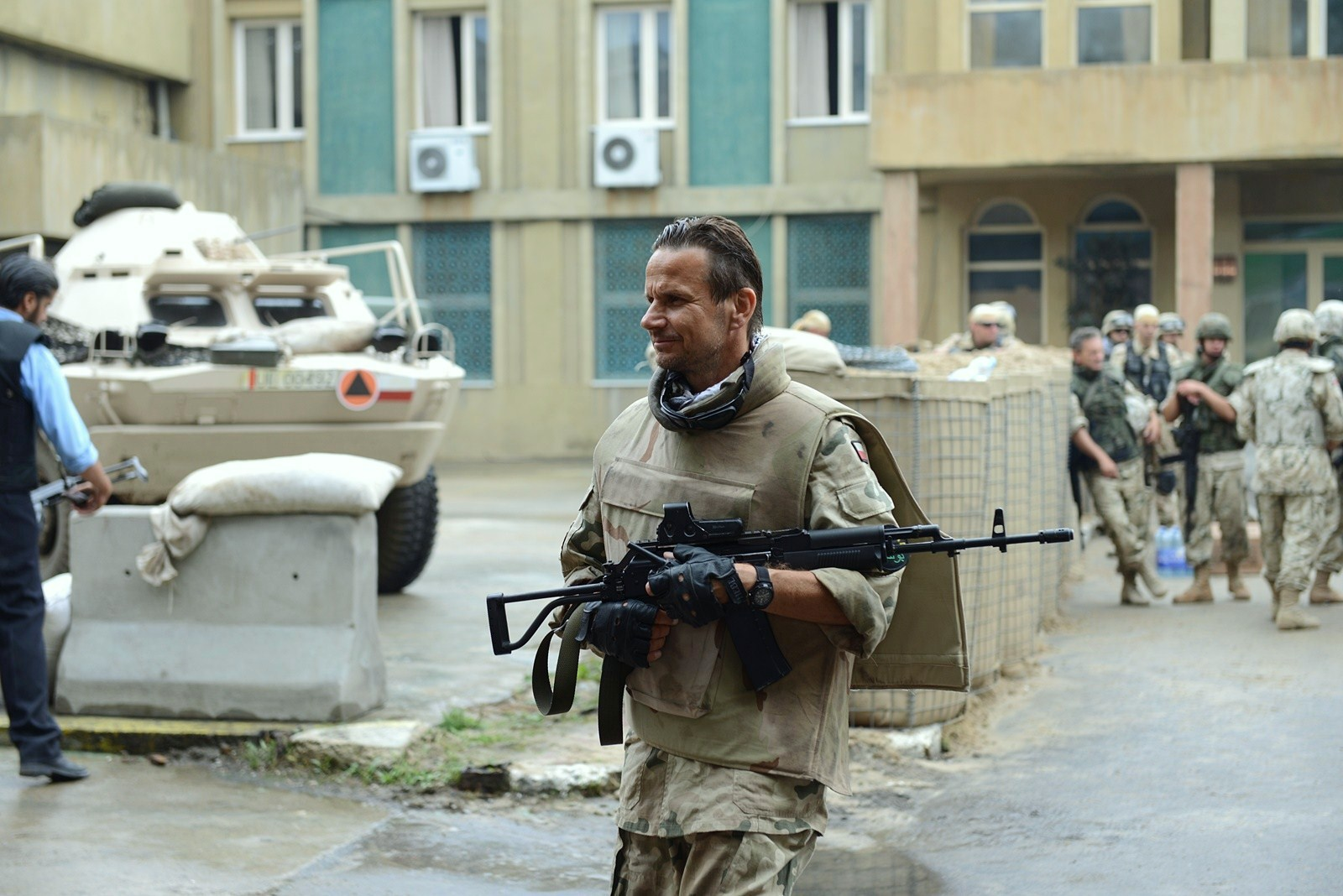
Topa on the set of Karbala

== Selected filmography ==
Film
Year	Title	Role	Notes
1990	The Bet		
2004	The Wedding		
2009	The Dark House		
2009	The Dark House		
2011	Wyjazd integracyjny	Krzysztof Dąbal	
2015	Karbala	Grzegorz Kaliciak (officer)	
2026	LARP: Love, Trolls and Other Quests	Writer Louis Lacroix	

TV
Year	Title	Role	Notes
2010	Usta usta	Mateusz	
2011	Układ Warszawski	Zbigniew Sikorek	
2014	Wataha	Adam Grzywaczewski	
2017–2019	Ultraviolet	Waldemar Kraszewski	22 episodes
2021—2023	The Convict	Piotr Serafin	17 episodes
2022	Hold Tight	Tadeusz Lewicki	
2023–present	1670	Jan Paweł Adamczewski	
2025–present	The Eastern Gate		
