= Michał Żurawski =

Polish actor

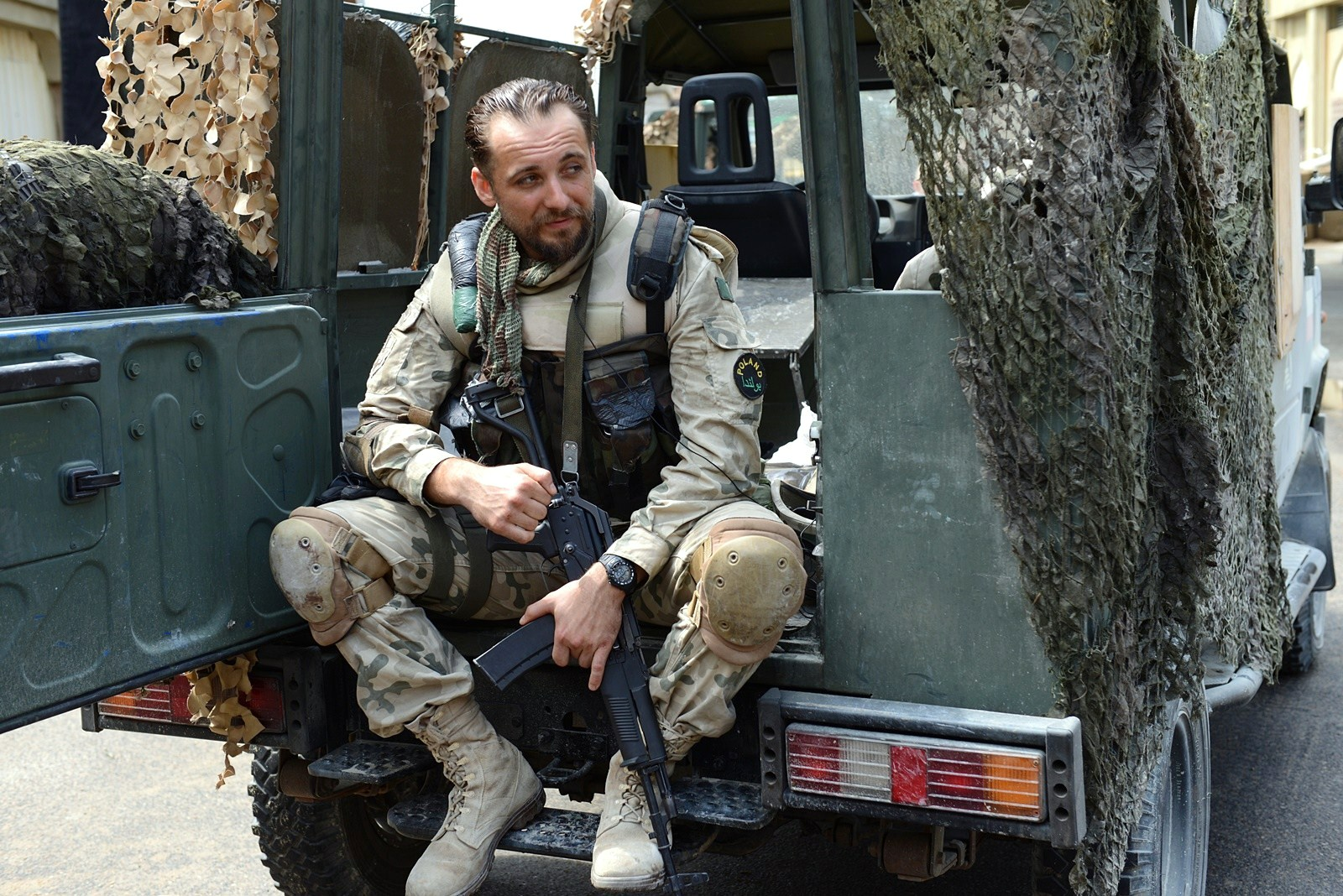
- Michał Żurawski (2014)
- Born: Poland
- Years active: 2002 – present

Michał Żurawski ([mixaw ʐuravski]) is a Polish theater, film, television, radio and dubbing actor. He is the brother of the actor Piotr Żurawski.

== Selected filmography ==
Year	Title	Role	Director	Notes
2002	Na dobre i na złe	Filip Krawczyk		soap opera, 4 episodes
2003	Samo Życie			soap opera
2004	Serce gór	Skaar	Rafał M. Lipka	
2005	Oda do radości	Waldek	Anna Kazejak-Dawid	
2007	Ekipa	Artur	Agnieszka Holland	TV series, 10 episodes
2008	Związek na odległość	Paweł		
2009	Zero	Chairman's wife lover	Paweł Borowski	
2009	Taras Bulba	Wojciech	Vladimir Bortko	
2009	Janosik. Prawdziwa historia	noncommissioned officer	Agnieszka Holland	
2010	1920. Wojna i miłość	Aleksandr Lwowicz Sribielnikow	Maciej Migas	TV series, main character
2010-2011	Ludzie Chudego	Łukasz Łukaszewicz		TV series (polish version Los hombres de Paco), main character, in original series his character is Lucas Fernández
2011	In Darkness (2011 film)	Antoni Bortnik	Agnieszka Holland	movie was nominated for the best foreign language film at the 84th Academy Awards.
2011	Kac Wawa	Grzmihuj	Łukasz Karwowski	this movie was called one of the worst polish production
2013	Czas honoru	Jabłoński		TV series, 13 episodes
2014	Warsaw 44	"Czarny"	Jan Komasa	
2014	Persona Non Grata	Nyiszli	Cellin Gluck	
2015	Karbala	Waszczuk 'Starszy'	Krzysztof Łukaszewicz	
2016	I'm a Killer	Marek	Maciej Pieprzyca	
2017	Volta	Dycha	Juliusz Machulski	
2020	Król	Jakub Szapiro	Jan Matuszyński	Canal+ Premium TV series, main character
