= The Mole (film) =

- Film poster
- Polish: Kret
- Directed by: Rafael Lewandowski
- Starring: Borys Szyc; Marian Dziędziel
- Edited by: Agnieszka Glińska
- Release dates: June 2011 (Gdynia); 5 August 2011
- Running time: 107 minutes
- Country: Poland
- Language: Polish

The Mole (Polish: Kret) is a 2011 Polish drama film directed by Rafael Lewandowski. The film premiered at the 2011 Gdynia Film Festival.

== Cast ==
- Borys Szyc as Pawel Kowal
- Marian Dziędziel as Zygmunt Kowal
- Magdalena Czerwińska as Ewa Kowal
- Wojciech Pszoniak as Stefan Grabek
- Bartłomiej Topa as Manager of 'Solidarity'
- Jerzy Janeczek as Rysiek
