= Dybala =

Dybala (Slovak: [ˈdibala], Polish: [dɨˈbala]), more commonly Dybała [dɨˈbawa] in Polish, is a surname of West Slavic origin, e.g. from the verb dybać 'to lurk'. Notable people with the surname include:

- Ignacy Dybała (1926–2016), Polish footballer
- Matej Dybala (born 1999), Slovak footballer
- Paulo Dybala (born 1993), Argentine footballer

== See also ==
- Dąbal
- Dybal
