= Defense of the Karbala City Hall =

2004 battle in the Iraq war

Defense Of the Karabala City Hall
- Part of 2004 spring fighting of Iraq War
Date	3–6 April 2004 (4 days)
Location	Karbala, Karbala Governorate, Iraq
Result	Polish-Bulgarian victory: Mahdi Army fails to capture building

Belligerents
Poland; Bulgaria; Iraq	Mahdi Army

Commanders and leaders
(Poland) Tomasz Domański (Poland) Grzegorz Kaliciak	Unknown

Units involved
Multinational Division Central-South: Polish Army; Bulgarian Army; Ministry of Interior (Iraq): Iraqi Police	Unknown

Strength
Poland: 30 soldiers; Bulgaria: 20 soldiers; Iraq: Several police officers	Unknown

Casualties and losses
Associated Press: 6 killed; 13 injured; Polish claim: 1 injured	Polish claim: (unconfirmed): 80 killed

The Defense of the Karbala City Hall (Polish: Obrona ratusza w Karbali) (Bulgarian: Отбраната на кметството в Кербала) was a series of clashes fought from April 3 to April 6, 2004, between Iraqi insurgents of the Mahdi Army, who attempted to capture the city hall in central Karbala, and Polish and Bulgarian soldiers of the Multinational Division Central-South, who defended the building.

== Background ==
On April 4, 2004, the Mahdi Army, led by Muqtada al-Sadr, launched a series of uprisings against US-led Coalition forces in several Iraqi cities, including Karbala.

== See also ==
- 2004 Ashura massacre
- 2004 Karbala bombings
- Operation Iron Saber
- Karbala (film)
