= Marian Dziędziel =

Polish actor (born 1947)

Marian Dziędziel Cross of Merit Gloria Artis Medal Order of Polonia Restituta
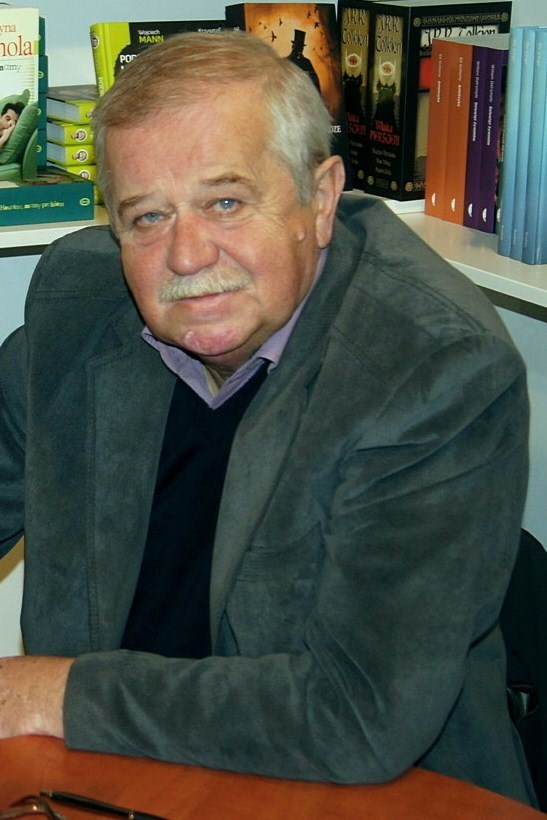
- Dziędziel in 2012
- Born: 5 August 1947 (age 78); Gołkowice, Silesian Voivodeship, Poland
- Occupation: Actor
- Years active: 1968–present
- Spouse(s): Halina Wyrodek (m. 19??; her death 2008)
- Children: 2 daughters

Marian Dziędziel (born 5 August 1947) is a Polish actor. He received three Polish Academy Award for Best Actor nominations winning for his role in The Wedding (2004). In his career spanning half a century, Dziędziel has appeared in more than one hundred films and television series.

== Selected filmography ==
| Year | Title | Role | Notes |
|---|---|---|---|
| 1986 | Boris Godunov | | |
| 2004 | My Nikifor | | |
| 2004 | The Wedding | | |
| 2004 | Vinci | | |
| 2005 | The Collector | | |
| 2006 | We're All Christs | | |
| 2009 | The Dark House | | |
| 2011 | Battle of Warsaw 1920 | | |
| 2011 | Rose | | |
| 2011 | Courage | | |
| 2011 | The Mole | | |
| 2013 | Traffic Department | | |
| 2014 | The Mighty Angel | | |
| 2015 | These Daughters of Mine | | |
