= The Dark House (2009 Polish film) =

- Directed by: Wojciech Smarzowski
- Screenplay by: Wojciech Smarzowski; Łukasz Kośmicki
- Starring: Marian Dziędziel; Arkadiusz Jakubik; Kinga Preis; Bartłomiej Topa
- Cinematography: Krzysztof Ptak
- Edited by: Paweł Laskowski
- Music by: Mikołaj Trzaska
- Distributed by: ITI Cinema
- Release date: 27 November 2009
- Running time: 106 minutes
- Country: Poland
- Language: Polish
- Budget: approx. 1 000 000 EUR
- Box office: $ 1 222 530

The Dark House (Polish: Dom zły) is a 2009 Polish horror/drama film directed by Wojciech Smarzowski.

== Plot ==
Edward Środoń, an unemployed zootechnician from Mosty with a dark past and a growing drinking problem, tries to start over with a clean slate. He sets out to the Bieszczady Mountains to take up a job there at the local State Agricultural Farm.

A twist of events makes him stop over for the night at the house of the Dziabas family. The initial feelings of mutual distrust between the guest and his hosts are softened with consecutive rounds of moonshine.

Środoń slowly learns more about the family and its own problems. The unfolding story is intertwined with a parallel one which sees Środoń four years later, during martial law in Poland, taking part in a reenactment of the events that took place at the Dziabas house during his visit. The reenactment is led by Lieutenant Mróz from the Civic Militia who is slowly unveiling the truth about what happened four years before, at the same time being troubled by ghosts of his own past.

== Cast ==
- Arkadiusz Jakubik – Edward Środoń
- Marian Dziędziel – Zdzisław Dziabas
- Kinga Preis – Bożena Dziabasowa
- Bartłomiej Topa – Mróz
- Katarzyna Cynke – Maria Lisowska / Grażyna Środoniowa
- Robert Wabich – Lisowski
- Robert Więckiewicz – Prosecutor Tomala
- Eryk Lubos – Petrycki
- Grzegorz Wojdon
- Robert Wabich
- Katarzyna Cynke
- Krzysztof Czeczot
- Lech Dyblik
- Marek Juchniewicz
- Bartosz Żukowski
- Sławomir Orzechowski
- Przemysław Witowski
- Anna Grzeszczak-Hutek
- Krzysztof Domaszczyński
- Mariusz Jakus
- Dorota Piasecka
- Paweł Miśkowiec
- Agnieszka Matysiak
- Jerzy Rogalski
- Maciej Maciejewski
- Michał Gadomski
- Zbigniew Paterak
