= Jurek Dybał =

Polish musician

Jurek Dybal
- Born: 22 June 1977 (age 47); Poland
- Occupations: conductor; Double-bassist
- Organizations: Sinfonietta Cracovia
- Website: www.JurekDybal.com

Jerzy "Jurek" Dybał (born 22 June 1977) is a Polish conductor and solo double-bassist. Since 2013, he is the director of the International Krzysztof Penderecki Festival in Zabrze, Poland. Since 2014, he is the director of orchestra at Sinfonietta Cracovia in Kraków.
