= Arkadiusz Jakubik =

Polish actor and musician

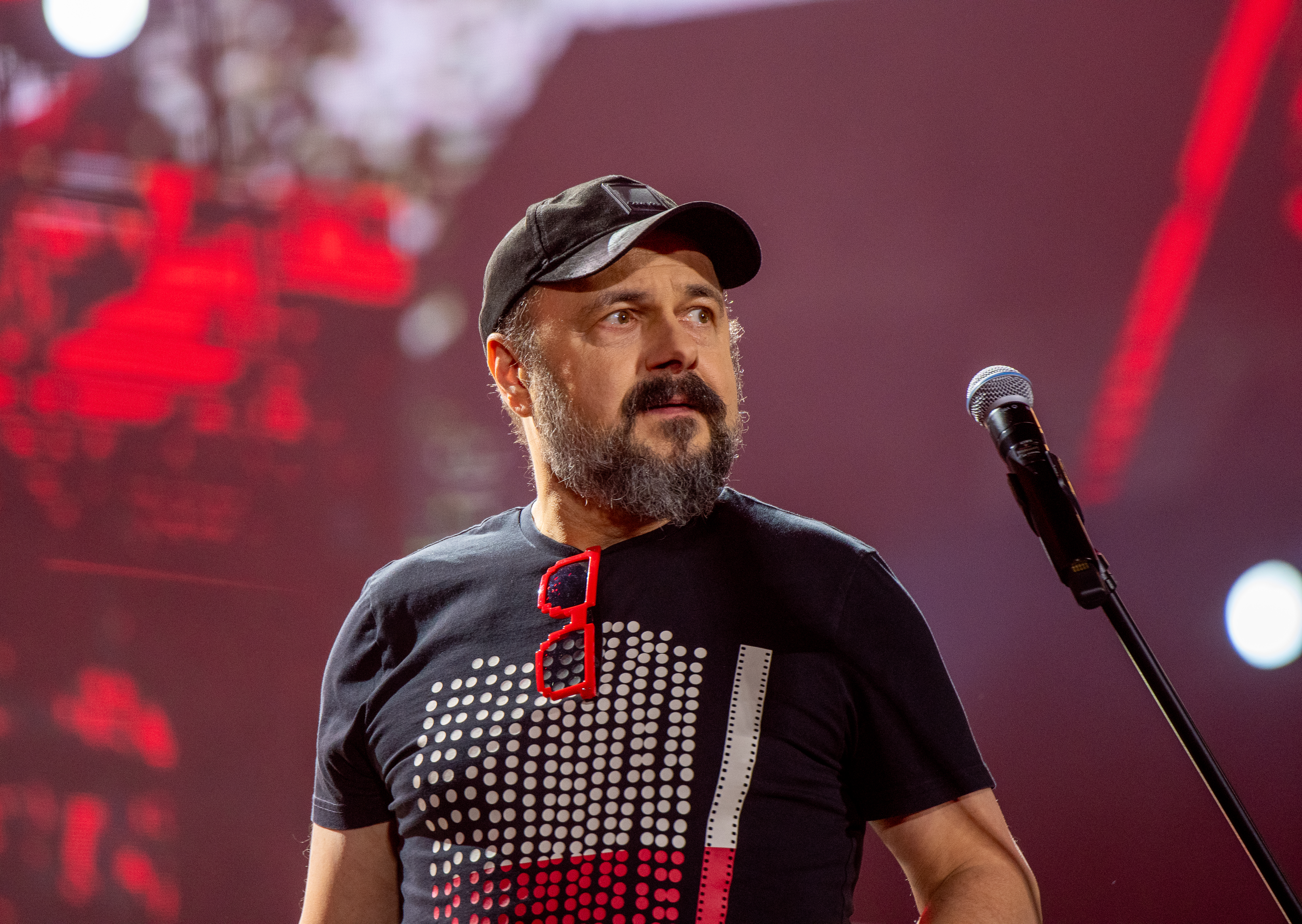
- Arkadiusz Jakubik with Dr Misio in 2023
- Born: 14 January 1969 (age 57); Strzelce Opolskie, Polish People’s Republic
- Education: Ludwik Solski Academy for the Dramatic Arts
- Years active: 1977 – present
- Spouse: Agnieszka Matysiak
- Musical career
- Genre: Rock and roll
- Instrument: Vocals
- Label: Universal Music Poland

Arkadiusz Jakubik ([jakubik]; born 14 January 1969 in Strzelce Opolskie) is a Polish actor, scriptwriter, voice actor and musician. Known mainly for portrayal of a disabled cop Rysio in 13 posterunek sitcom and for wide collaboration with Wojciech Smarzowski. A 1992 graduate of Ludwik Solski Academy for the Dramatic Arts – Faculty in Wrocław. In 2008 he founded and became the vocalist of a rock band Dr Misio. He is the recipient of four Polish Academy Awards for Best Supporting Actor.

== Filmography ==
- 13 posterunek 2 (1999–2000) – Aspirant Rysio
- Codzienna 2 m. 3 (2005–2007) – janitor Leon
- The Wedding (2004) – notary Janocha
- The Dark House (2009) – Edward Środoń
- Piąty Stadion (2012) – Jarek 'Pele' Malak
- Jesteś Bogiem (2012) – Gustaw
- Traffic Department (2012) – Senior Sergeant Bogdan Petrycki
- The Snow Queen (2013) - Orm
- Life Feels Good (2013) – Paweł Rosiński
- The Mighty Angel (2014) – Terrorist
- Volhynia (2016) – Maciej Skiba
- Jestem mordercą (2016) – Wiesław Kalicki
- Breaking the Limits (2017) – swimming pool manager
- Cicha noc (2017) – Zbigniew, Adam's father
- Clergy (2018) – Priest Andrzej Kukuła
- The Elements of Sasza – Fire (2020) – Aleksander Krysiak
- Klangor (2021) – Rafał Wejman
- Feedback (2023) – Marcin Kania
- Through the Wall (2026) – Jerzy's father
- Our Revolution (2026) – Jacek Kuroń

== References and external links ==
- Arkadiusz Jakubik at IMDb
- Filmweb.pl profile
