= Karbala (film) =

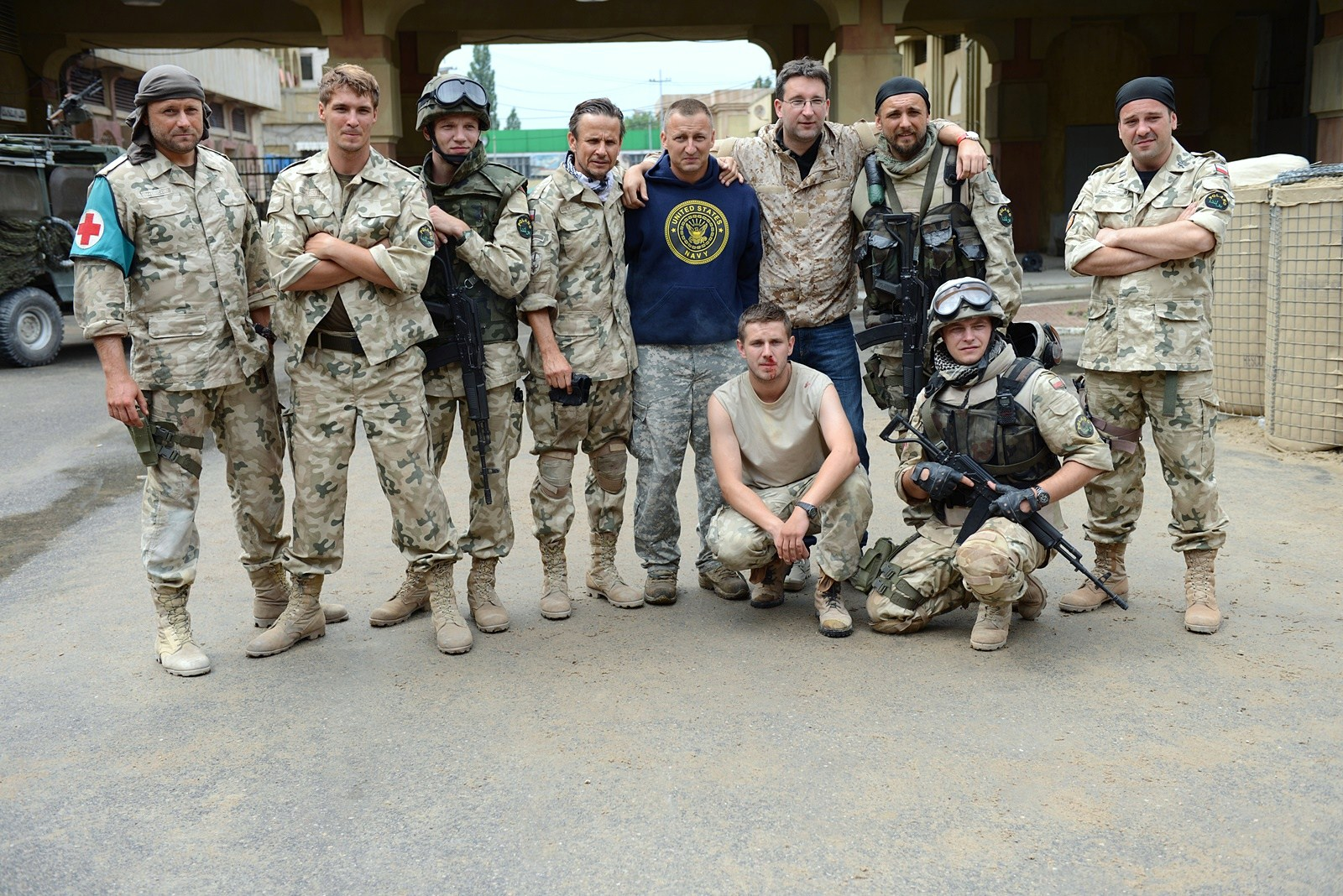
- Colonel Grzegorz Kaliciak, director Krzysztof Łukaszewicz and actors on the Karbala movie set
- Directed by: Krzysztof Łukaszewicz
- Starring: Bartłomiej Topa; Antoni Królikowski
- Cinematography: Arkadiusz Tomiak
- Release date: 11 September 2015
- Running time: 115 minutes
- Country: Poland
- Language: Polish
- Box office: $1 839 975

Karbala is a 2015 Polish war drama film based on real events directed by filmmaker Krzysztof Łukaszewicz and set during the 2003 invasion of Iraq. It portrays the defense of the Karbala City Hall by the Polish and Bulgarian stabilization forces during the Shia rebellion in 2004. The film had its premiere on 11 September 2015.

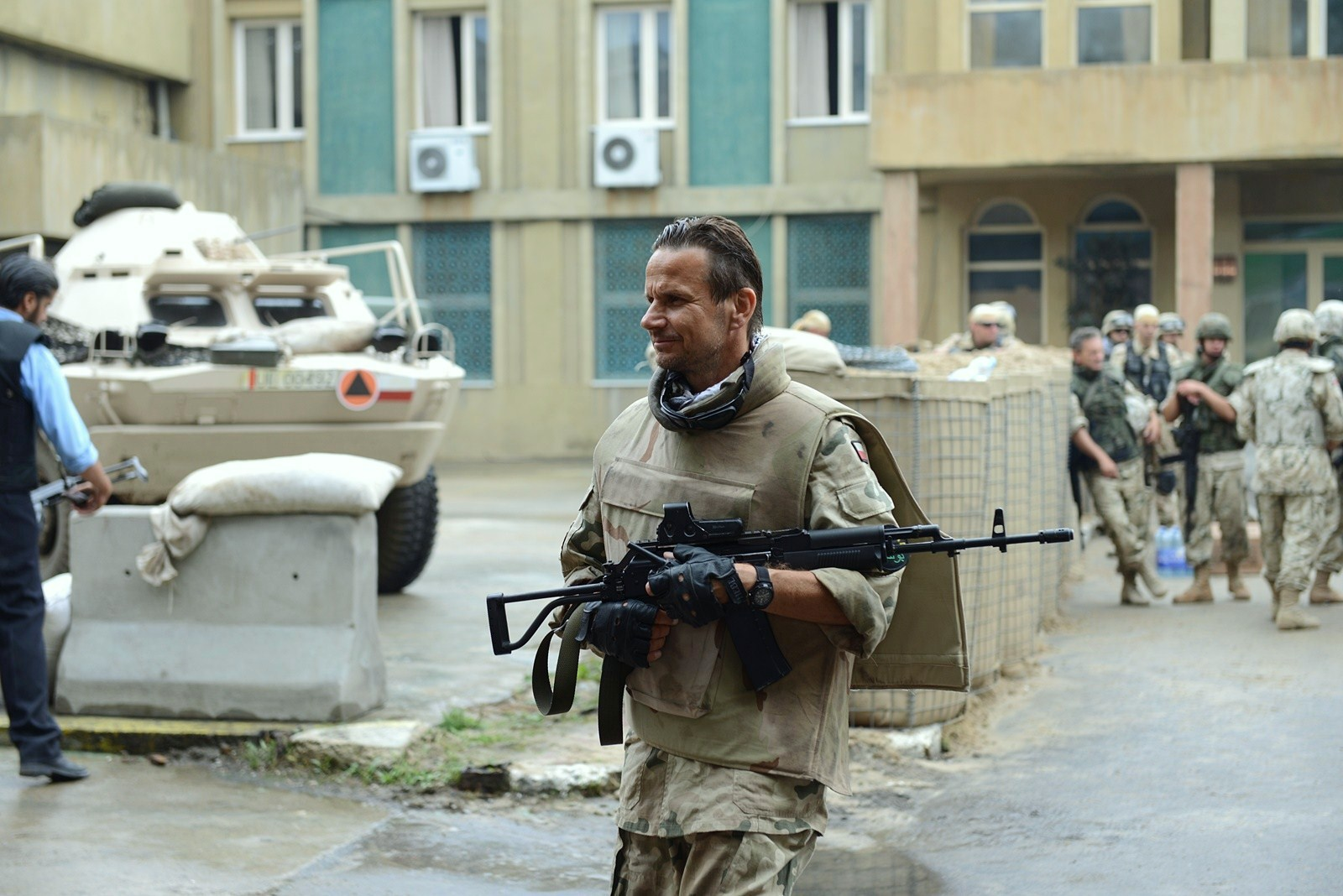
Bartłomiej Topa on the Karbala movie set

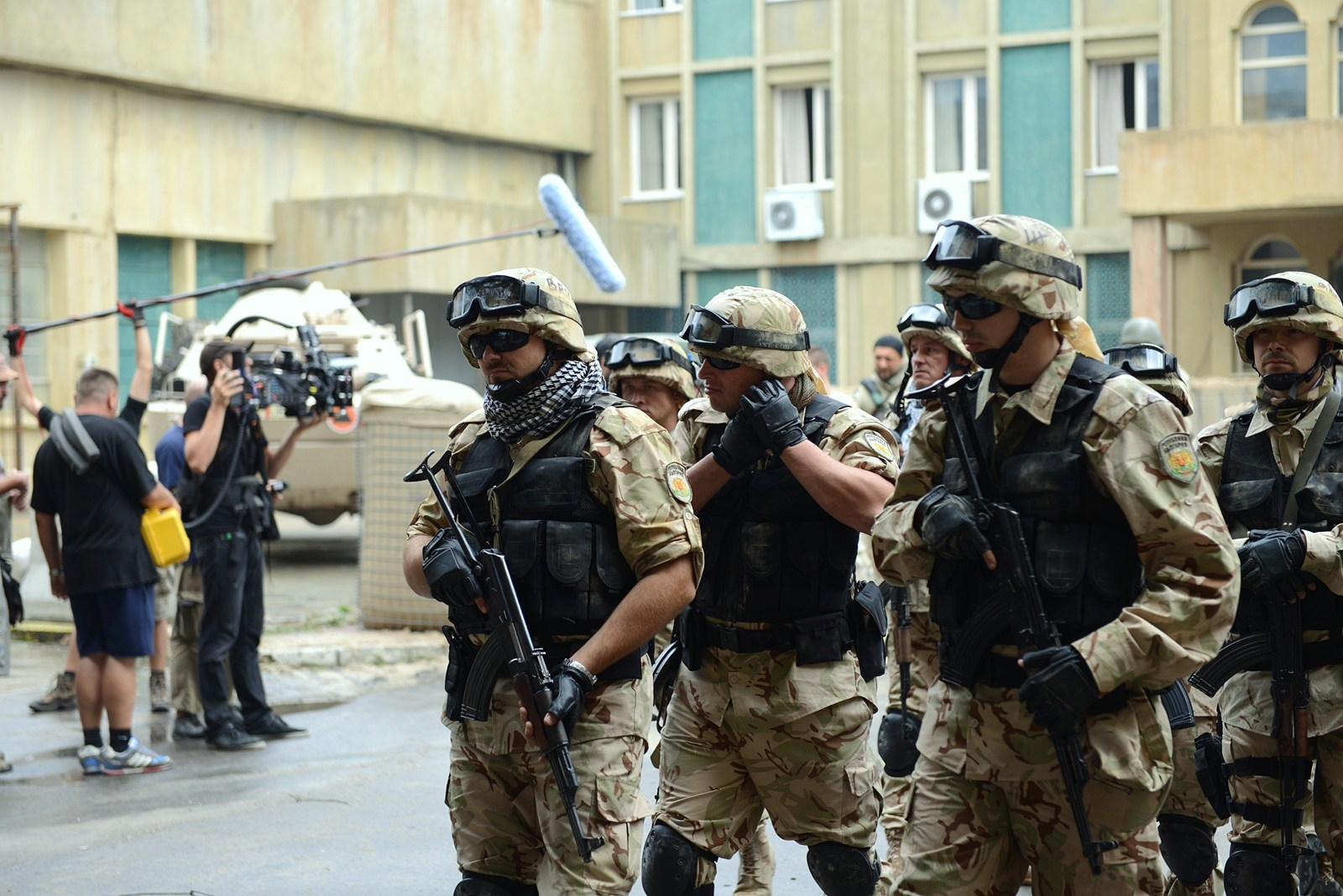
Photo plan

== Cast ==
- Bartłomiej Topa – Kalicki
- Antoni Królikowski – Kamil Grad
- Hristo Shopov – bulgarian army captain Getow
- Mikołaj Roznerski – Różdżyński "Rożen"
- Atheer Adel – Fraid
- Leszek Lichota – Malenczuk "Maly"
- Michał Żurawski – Waszczuk "Starszy"
- Tomasz Schuchardt – Sobanski
- Zbigniew Stryj -–Dabek
- Piotr Żurawski – Waszczuk "Mlody"
- Łukasz Simlat – "X"
- Fatima Yazdani – Córka Farida

== See also ==
- Grzegorz Kaliciak (officer)
- Defense of the Karbala City Hall
