= Andrzej Jakimowski =

Polish film director (born 1963)

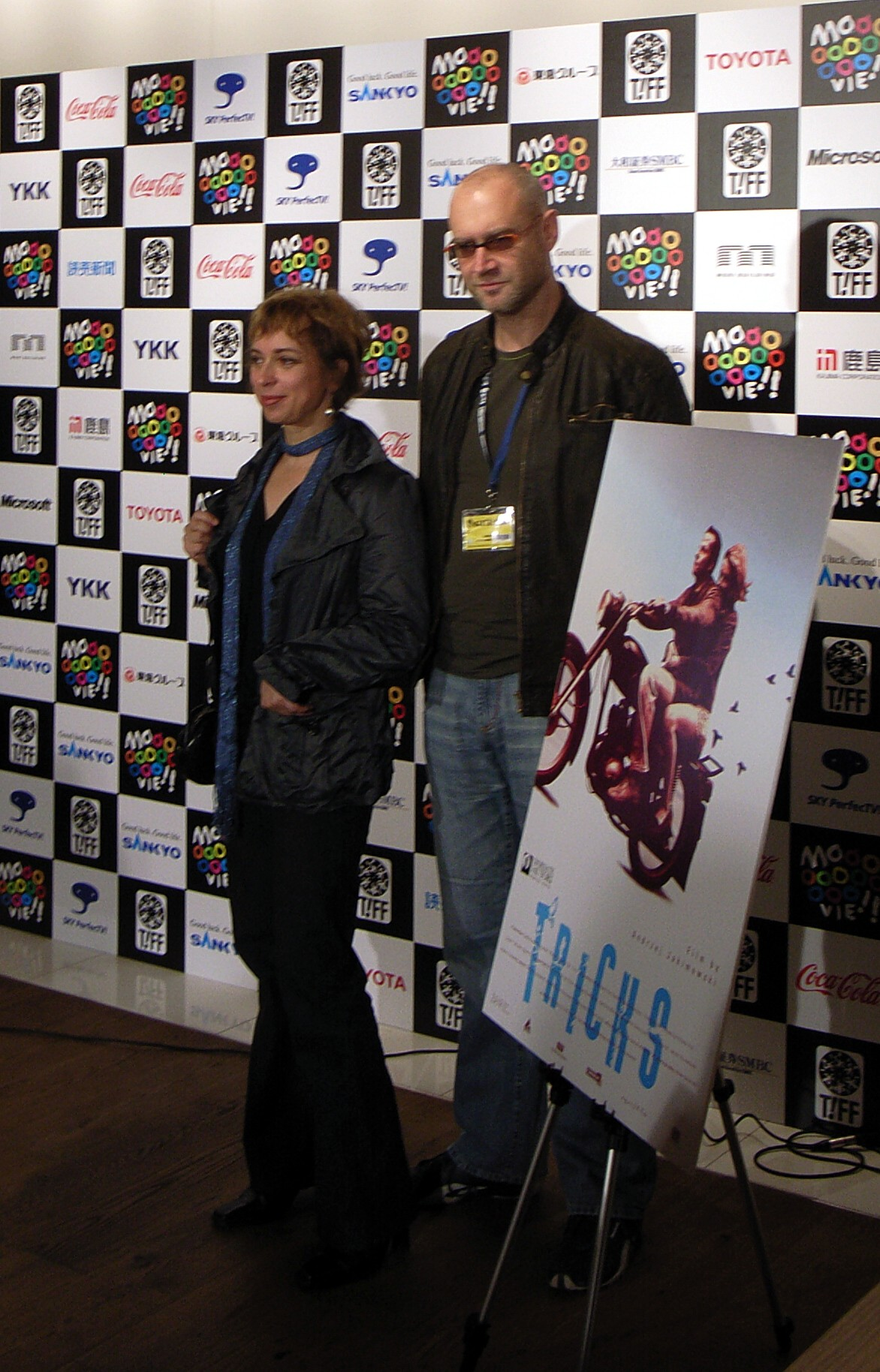
- Born: 17 August 1963 (age 63); Warsaw, Poland
- Occupations: Film director, screenwriter, producer
- Spouse: Ewa Jakimowska

Andrzej Jakimowski (born 17 August 1963) is a Polish film director, writer and producer, best known for directing the films Squint Your Eyes (Polish: Zmruż oczy) and Tricks (Polish: Sztuczki). He is an alumnus of Krzysztof Kieślowski Film School in Katowice.

== Film career ==
=== Squint Your Eyes ===
Squint Your Eyes is Andrzej Jakimowski's 2002 drama about a ten-year-old girl named Mała (The Little One). Mała runs away from the affluence of her parents home to the abandoned farm of her former teacher, Jasiek. With her parents and Jasiek both attempting to persuade Mała to return home, the story undergoes a few twists and turns, providing a fascinating meditation on the wiles of youth, and the adult reaction to them.

=== Tricks ===
Tricks is a 2007 drama written, directed and produced by Andrzej Jakimowski. It tells the tale of Stefek, 6 years old, who believes that the chain of events he sets in motion will help him get closer to his father who abandoned his mother.

=== Imagine ===
In 2012, he directed the film Imagine.

=== Once Upon a Time in November ===
The film Once Upon a Time in November referring to the co-called March of Independence of 2013 organised by the Polish far-right ultranationalist organisations All-Polish Youth and the National Radical Camp was premiered at the 33rd Warsaw Film Festival. It contains documentary shots of the demonstration.
