= Dąbale =

Part of Stany, Podkarpackie Voivodeship, Poland

Coordinates: 50°26′22″N 21°58′45″E

Dąbale is a part of the village of Stany located in the Bojanów Commune, Stalowa Wola County, Subcarpathian Voivodeship, Poland.

In the years 1975–1998, Dąbale administratively belonged to the Tarnobrzeg Voivodeship.
