= Tomasz Schuchardt =

Polish actor

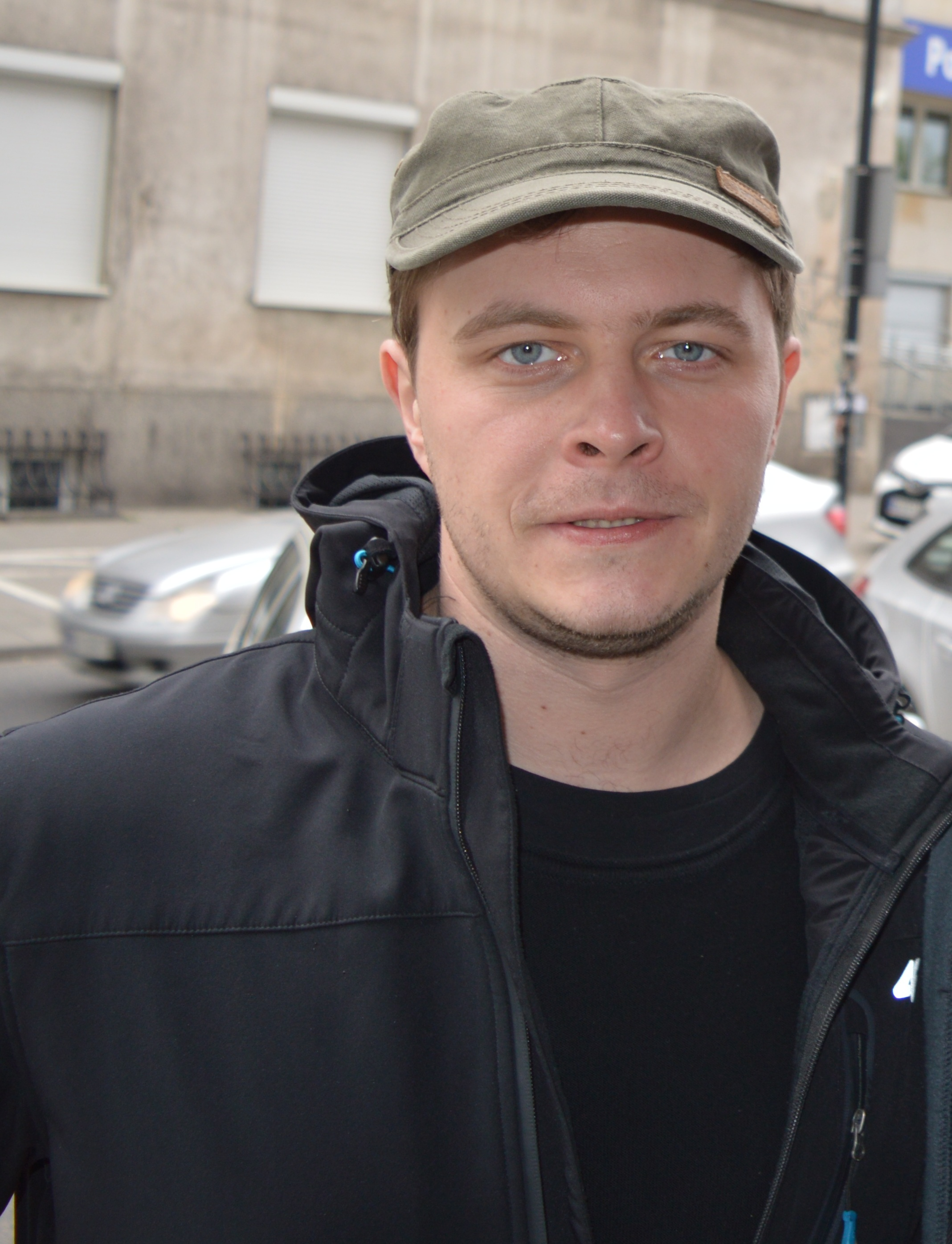
- Schuchardt in 2015
- Born: 18 September 1986 (age 39); Starogard Gdański, Poland
- Education: National Academy of Theatre Arts in Kraków
- Occupation: Actor
- Years active: 2007-present

Tomasz Schuchardt (born 18 September 1986) is a Polish actor. He has appeared in more than twenty films since 2007. He received three Gdynia Film Festival Awards and nomination for Polish Academy Award for Best Actor for 2022 drama film, Chrzciny. In 2024, he won the Polish Academy Award for Best Supporting Actor for his performance in Doppelgänger.

== Life and career ==
Schuchardt was born and raised in Starogard Gdański. He graduated from the AST National Academy of Theatre Arts in Kraków. After playing several small roles, Schuchardt starred in the drama film, The Christening, receiving his first Gdynia Film Festival Award for Best Actor. He later appeared in films Courage (2011), Suicide Room (2011), Yuma (2012), and most notable, You Are God, receiving Best Supporting Actor at Gdynia Film Festival. In 2014 he appeared in the drama film, In the Name Of directed by Małgorzata Szumowska, and in 2016 in the horror film, Demon. In 2016 he played Eugeniusz Bodo in the television miniseries, Bodo.

Schuchardt starred in the television series The Convict and High Water. He appeared in films Piłsudski, The Wedding and Operation Hyacinth. He received a Polish Academy Award for Best Actor nomination for the 2022 drama film, Chrzciny.

== Selected filmography ==
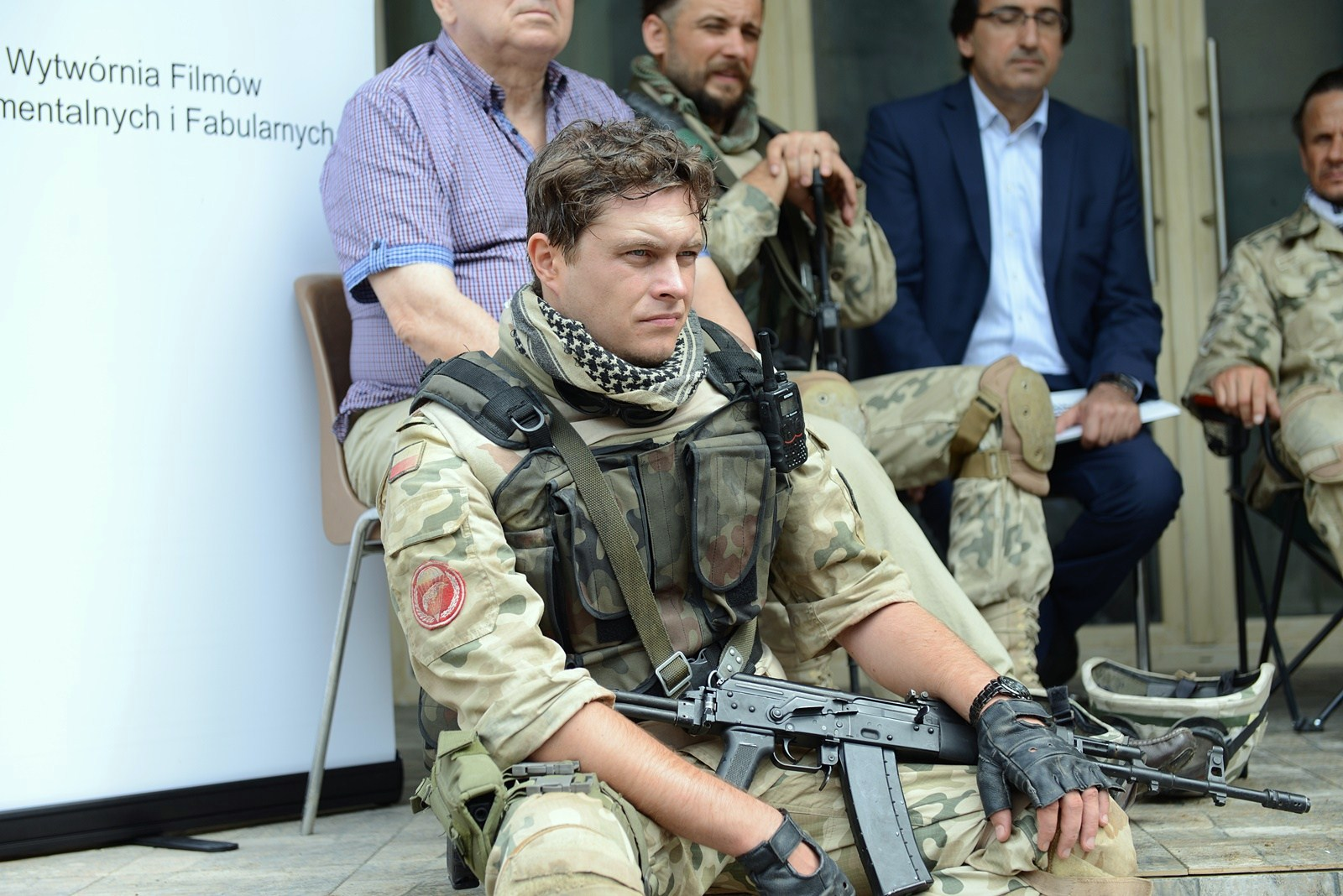
Tomasz Schuchardt on the Karbala movie set

Year	Title	Role	Notes
2010	The Christening	Janek	Gdynia Film Festival Award for Best Actor
2011	Suicide Room		
2012	You Are God	Fokus	Gdynia Film Festival Award for Best Supporting Actor
2014	In the Name Of	Adrian	
2014	Warsaw 44	Kobra	
2015	Karbala		
2016	Demon		
2017	Cicha noc	Marcin, Jolka's husband	
2019	Piłsudski	Aleksander Prystor	
2019	The Defence	Gorzym	
2021	The Wedding	Romek	
2021	Operation Hyacinth	Wojtek	
2021—2024	The Convict	Bartlomiej Dworak	
2022	Chrzciny	Wojtek	Nominated — Polish Academy Award for Best Actor
2022	High Water	Jakub Marczak	
2022	Below The Surface	lieutenant Florian Roszak “Trzonek”	
2023	Doppelgänger	Jan Bitner	Gdynia Film Festival Award for Best Supporting Actor; Polish Academy Award for Best Supporting Actor
2024	Divorce	Andrzej	
2025	Ministranci	retreat leader	
2025	Czarne stokrotki	Majcher	
2026	The Doll	Stanisław Wokulski	
