= The Mighty Angel =

2014 Polish film

- Film poster
- Directed by: Wojciech Smarzowski
- Written by: Jerzy Pilch; Wojciech Smarzowski
- Produced by: Jacek Rzehak; Zbigniew Adamkiewicz; Bartosz Grabaczyk
- Starring: Robert Więckiewicz; Julia Kijowska; Adam Woronowicz
- Cinematography: Tomasz Madejski
- Music by: Mikolaj Trzaska
- Release date: 17 January 2014
- Running time: 110 minutes
- Country: Poland
- Language: Polish
- Box office: $ 5 235 397

The Mighty Angel (Polish: Pod Mocnym Aniołem) is a 2014 Polish drama film directed by Wojciech Smarzowski based on a book of the same name by Jerzy Pilch. It won Best Actor Award during 27th Tokyo International Film Festival.

== Cast ==
- Robert Więckiewicz - Jerzy
- Julia Kijowska - She
- Adam Woronowicz - He
- Jacek Braciak - Columbus
- Lech Dyblik - Leader
- Arkadiusz Jakubik - Terrorist
- Iwona Wszolkówna - Joanna
- Kinga Preis - Mania
- Iwona Bielska - Queen of Kent
- Marian Dziedziel - Moonshine King
- Krzysztof Kiersznowski - Engineer
- Marcin Dorociński - Borys
- Izabela Kuna - Katarzyna
- Andrzej Grabowski - Dr. Granada
- Sebastian Fabijański - young Engineer
- Monika Dorota - Nurse
