= You Are God =

- Film poster
- Polish: Jesteś Bogiem
- Directed by: Leszek Dawid
- Starring: Marcin Kowalczyk; Dawid Ogrodnik
- Cinematography: Radosław Ładczuk
- Edited by: Jarosław Kamiński
- Release dates: 7 May 2012 (Gdynia); 21 September 2012
- Running time: 110 minutes
- Country: Poland
- Language: Polish
- Box office: $8,267,630

You Are God (Polish: Jesteś Bogiem) is a 2012 Polish biography film directed by Leszek Dawid. It is the story of Polish hip-hop group Paktofonika.

The film premiered at the 2012 Gdynia Film Festival.

== Cast ==
- Marcin Kowalczyk as Magik
- Dawid Ogrodnik as Rahim
- Tomasz Schuchardt as Fokus
- Arkadiusz Jakubik as Gustaw Zarzycki
- Katarzyna Wajda as Justyna Luszcz
- Marcin Dorociński as Manager
- Przemysław Bluszcz as Magik's father
- Halina Bednarz as Magik's mother
- Magdalena Kacprzak as Magda
