= Traffic Department (film) =

2013 Polish crime film

- Directed by: Wojciech Smarzowski
- Written by: Wojciech Smarzowski
- Produced by: Dariusz Pietrykowski; Andrzej Połeć
- Starring: Bartłomiej Topa; Arkadiusz Jakubik; Julia Kijowska; Eryk Lubos; Jacek Braciak; Marcin Dorociński; Robert Wabich; Marian Dziędziel
- Cinematography: Piotr Sobociński Jr.
- Edited by: Paweł Laskowski
- Music by: Mikołaj Trzaska
- Release date: 1 February 2013
- Running time: 118 minutes
- Country: Poland
- Language: Polish
- Box office: $ 6 322 254

Traffic Department (Polish: Drogówka) is a 2013 Polish crime film directed by Wojciech Smarzowski. It competed in the main competition section of the 35th Moscow International Film Festival.

== Plot ==
The film is a story of seven policemen who, apart from work, share friendship, parties, sports cars and common interests. Their small, closed world seems to work perfectly well. Everything changes when one of them dies under mysterious circumstances. Sergeant Ryszard Król (Bartek Topa) is accused of the murder. Trying to clear himself of the charges, he discovers the truth about criminal connections at the highest levels of government.

== Cast ==
- Bartłomiej Topa as Ryszard Król
- Arkadiusz Jakubik as Bogdan Petrycki
- Julia Kijowska as Maria Madecka
- Eryk Lubos as Marek Banaś
- Robert Wabich as Henryk Hawryluk
- Jacek Braciak as Jerzy Trybus
- Marcin Dorociński as Krzysztof Lisowski
- Marian Dziędziel as Gołąb
- Agata Kulesza as Jadzia
- Izabela Kuna as Ewa
- Maciej Stuhr as Zaręba
- Henryk Gołębiewski as Driver
