= Tricks (2007 film) =

Tricks Sztuczki
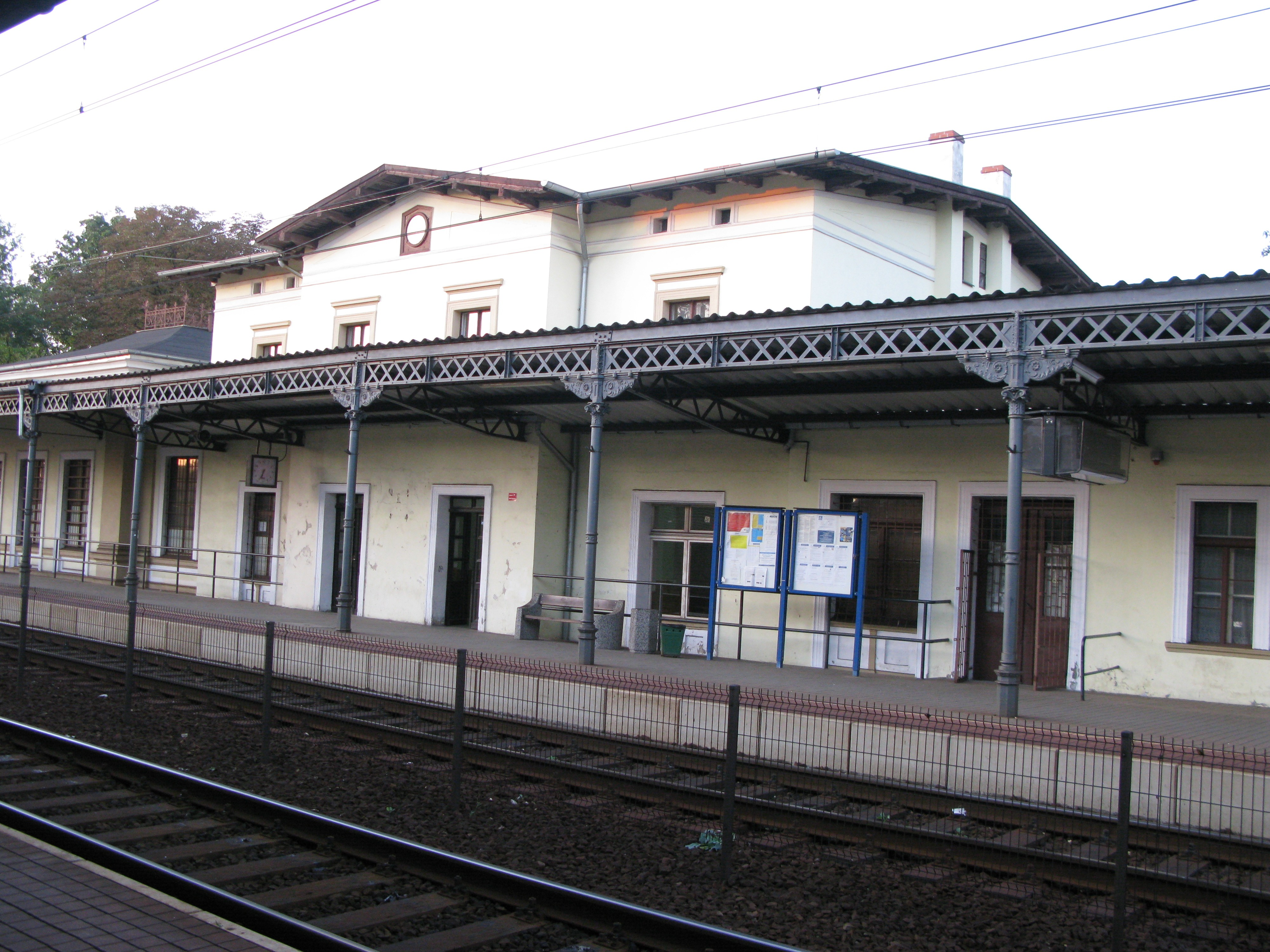
- Oława Railway Station where many scenes in the film were shot
- Directed by: Andrzej Jakimowski
- Written by: Tahila Jakimowski
- Produced by: Izabel Jakimowski
- Starring: Damian Ul; Ewelina Walendziak; Tomasz Sapryk
- Cinematography: Adam Bajerski
- Edited by: Cezary Grzesiuk
- Music by: Tomasz Gąssowski
- Release date: October 26, 2007 (Poland)
- Running time: 95 minutes
- Country: Poland
- Language: Polish

Tricks, (Polish: Sztuczki) is a 2007 Polish film written, directed and produced by Andrzej Jakimowski starring Damian Ul, Ewelina Walendziak and Tomasz Sapryk. Tricks is Andrzej Jakimowski's follow up to Squint Your Eyes (Zmruż oczy), his 2002 debut.

== Plot ==
A charming bittersweet narrative unfolds from director Andrzej Jakimowski. This is the story of siblings Stefek, 6, and Elka, 18, along with Elka's car mechanic boyfriend Jerzy during one sun-drenched summer. The siblings live with their mother who is a shopkeeper. Their father has left their mother for another woman, unaware of Stefek's existence. After a chance encounter at the local railway station, and despite a denial by his sister that this was his father, Stefek decides to challenge fate to engineer another meeting. He believes that the chain of events he sets in motion will help him get closer to his father who abandoned his mother. His sister Elka teaches him how to bribe fate with small sacrifices. Tricks played, coupled with a number of coincidences eventually bring the father to the mother's shop but the long-awaited reunion does not immediately materialise as expected. As a last chance, Stefak tries his good luck with the riskiest of his tricks.

== Cast ==
- Damian Ul as Stefek
- Ewelina Walendziak as Elka
- Tomasz Sapryk as Father of Stefek and Elka
- Rafal Guzniczak as Jerzy
- Iwona Fornalczyk as Mother of Stefek and Elka
- Joanna Liszowska as Violka
- Andrzej Golejewski as Homeless
- Grzegorz Stelmaszewski as Turek
- Simeone Matarelli as Leone

== Distribution and response ==
Tricks received a warm reception from the audience at the Venice Film Festival whilst at the same time gaining critics' approval. Iain Millar from the American channel Bloomberg wrote in his review: "The success of Sztuczki is due mostly to the incredible intuition of Jakimowski as a director. Although not nominated for the bigger awards, Tricks received attention from many film festivals. The film was chosen as Poland's official submission to the 81st Academy Awards for Best Foreign Language Film.

=== Awards ===
- Polish Film Festival
  - Best Cinematography - Adam Bajerski
  - Golden Lion - Andrzej Jakimowski
- São Paulo International Film Festival
  - Special Jury Award - Andrzej Jakimowski
- Tokyo International Film Festival
  - Best Actor Award - Damian Ul
- Venice Film Festival
  - Label Europa Cinemas - Andrzej Jakimowski
  - Laterna Magica Prize - Andrzej Jakimowski

=== Nominations ===
- São Paulo International Film Festival
  - International Jury Award - Andrzej Jakimowski
- Tokyo International Film Festival
  - Tokyo Grand Prix - Andrzej Jakimowski

== See also ==
- The Railway Children - 1970 film
