= Jacek Braciak =

Polish film and theater actor

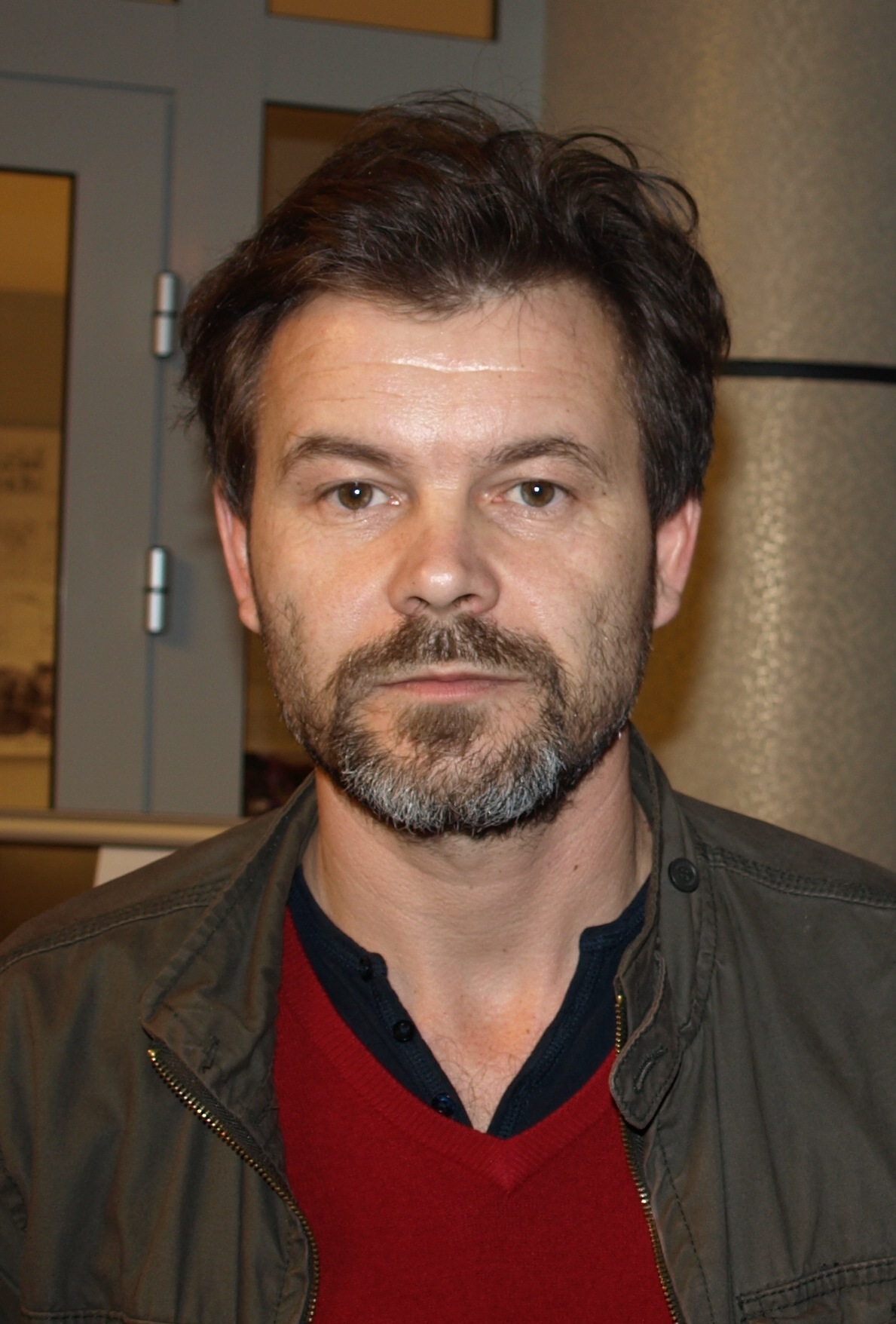
- Braciak in 2013
- Born: May 12, 1968 (age 58); Drezdenko, Polish People’s Republic
- Citizenship: Polish
- Education: National Academy of Dramatic Art, Warsaw
- Occupation: actor
- Years active: 1988–present

Jacek Braciak (Polish: [ˈjat͡sɛk ˈbrat͡sak]; born 12 May 1968) is a Polish film and theater actor. He has appeared in more than 60 films since 1991. Braciak has won three Polish Academy Awards for Best Supporting Actor for the films Edi (2003), Rose (2012) and Leave No Traces (2022).

== Selected filmography ==
- Edi (2002)
- The Master (2005)
- Retrieval (Z odzysku) (2006)
- Katyń (2007)
- Little Rose (Różyczka) (2010)
- Rose (Róża) (2011)
- Traffic Department (Drogówka) (2013)
- The Mighty Angel (2014)
- Volhynia (2016)
- Clergy (2018)
- I'll Find You (2019)
- Leave No Traces (2021)
- My Wonderful Life (2021)
- Scarborn (2023)
- Brat (2024) as Marcel, father of Dawid and Michał
