= Jerzy Rogalski =

Polish actor

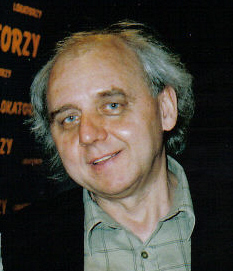
Jerzy Rogalski

Jerzy Rogalski (born 11 April 1948, Oleśnica, Poland) is a Polish film and theatre actor.

== Biography ==
Rogalski was a graduate of the National Film School in Łódź. From 1970 to 1974 he was associated with the Baltic Dramatic Theatre them. Julius Slovak in Koszalin, and from 1974 to 1975 at the Polish Theatre in Szczecin. Since 1976, he has been an actor with the Juliusz Osterwa theatre in Lublin. For many years he was associated with the Lublin cabaret "Loża 44". His role as Lieutenant Jaszczuk in the television series 07 zgłoś się was one of his more notable roles. Rogalski also appeared in films like Kogel-Mogel 3.
