= Krzysztof Kiersznowski =

Polish actor (1950–2021)

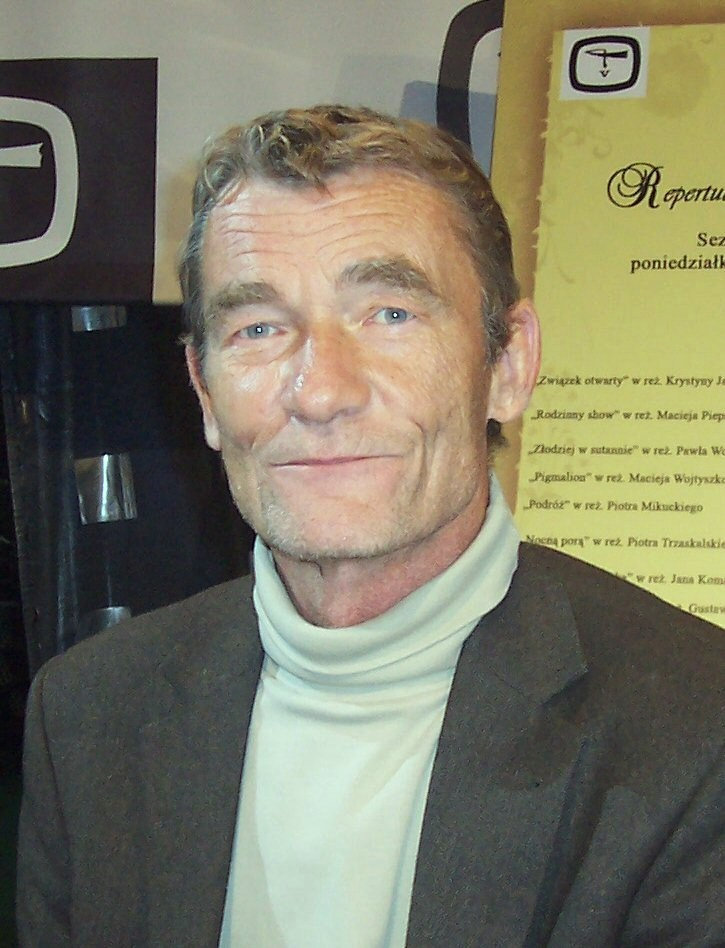
- Born: 26 November 1950; Warsaw, Poland
- Died: 24 October 2021 (aged 70); Warsaw, Poland
- Occupation: Actor
- Years active: 1977–2021

Krzysztof Kiersznowski (26 November 1950 – 24 October 2021) was a Polish actor. He appeared in more than 60 films and television shows from 1977 to 2021.

== Selected filmography ==
- Vabank (1981)
- Fever (1981)
- Kiler-ów 2-óch (1999)
- Strike (2006)
- The Mighty Angel (2014)
