= Zbigniew Stryj =

Polish actor

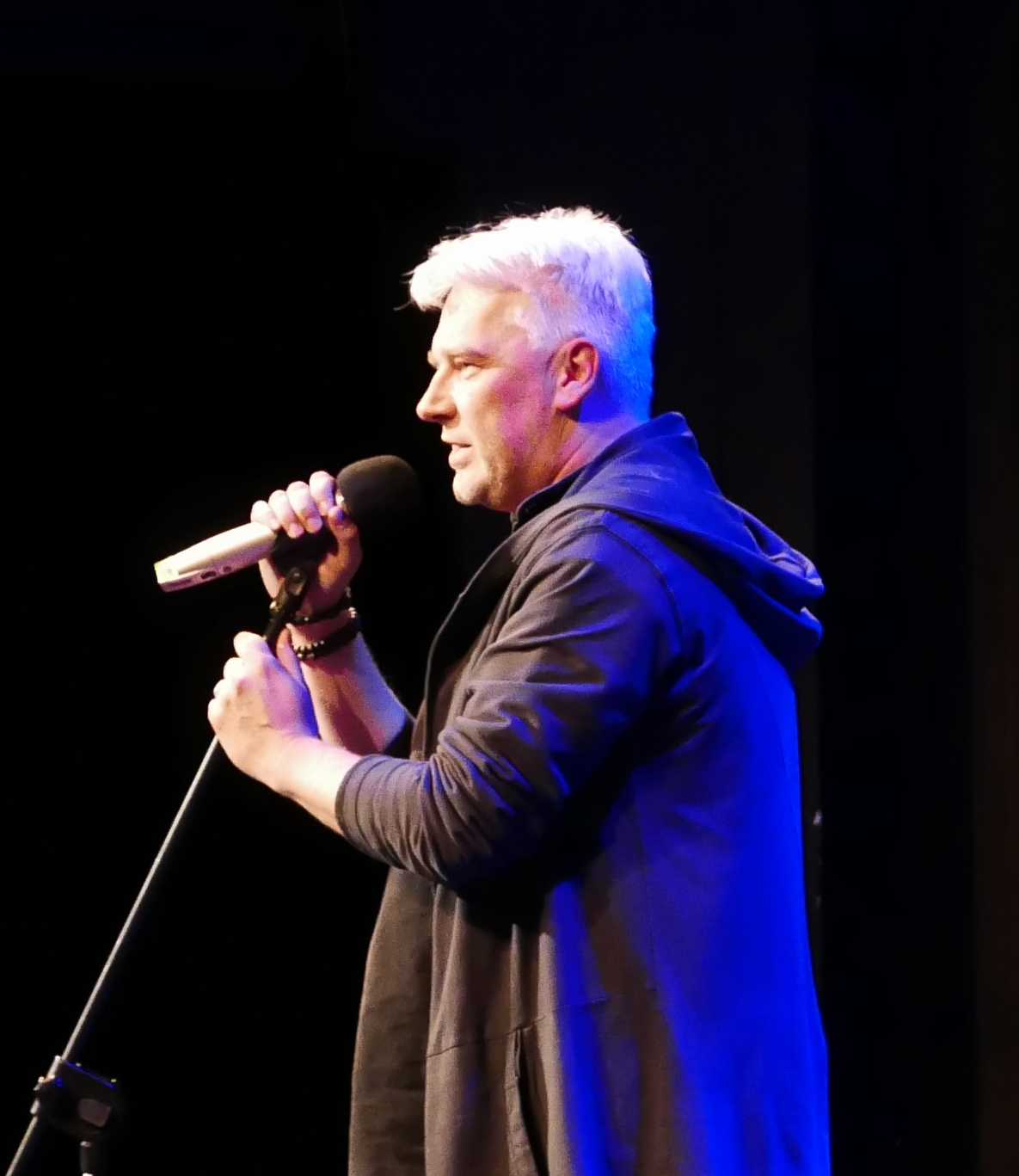
Zbigniew Stryj in 2018

Zbigniew Stryj (born 2 January 1968 in Zabrze, Poland) is a Polish actor.

== Filmography ==
- Goracy czwartek (1994)
- Święta polskie
- Barbórka (2005) as Hubert Szewczyk
- Na Wspólnej (2005 – current) as Adam Roztocki
- Kryminalni (2006) as Erwin Zych
- Co slonko widzialo (2006) as Guardian
- Benek (2007) as Eryk Kacik
- Drzazgi (2008) as Brother of Bartek's wife
- Karbala (2015)
- Raven (2021)
