= Leszek Lichota =

Polish actor

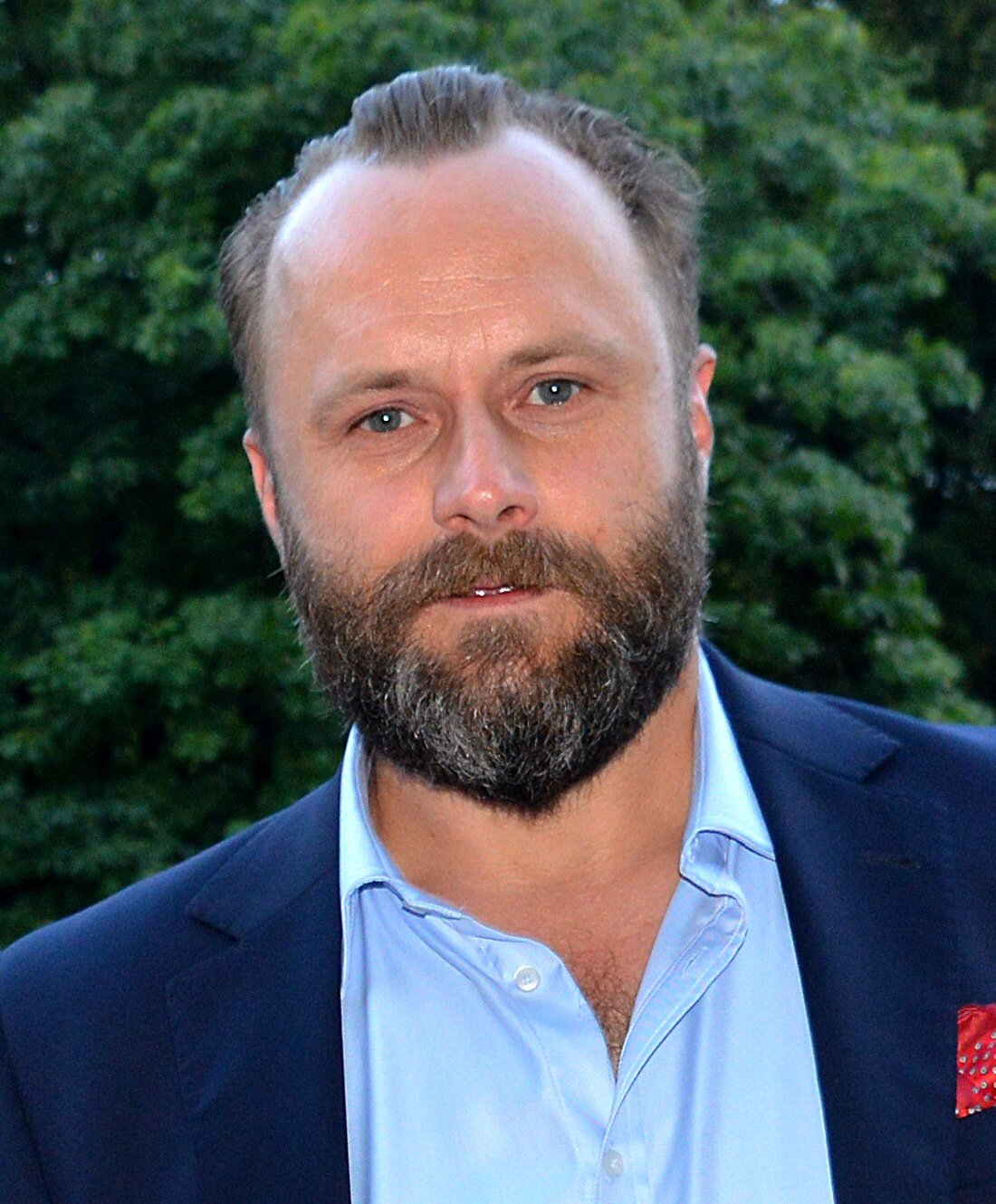
- Lichota in 2018
- Born: 17 August 1977 (age 48); Wałbrzych, Poland
- Occupation: Actor
- Years active: 1999–present

Leszek Lichota (born 17 August 1977, Wałbrzych, Poland) is a Polish actor, best known for playing Grzegorz in Polish soap opera Na Wspólnej.

== Life and career ==
In 2002, he graduated from the National Academy of Dramatic Art in Warsaw and started performing at the Polish Theatre in Poznań. He made his theatre debut in the role of Nany Sirbangh in Roman Jaworski's play Hamlet Wtóry. He also appeared on popular TV series such as Na Wspólnej and Prawo Agaty. In 2011, he was nominated to the Zbigniew Cybulski Award for his role in a 2010 film Lynch. His other notable roles are featured in Krzysztof Łukaszewicz's 2015 war drama Karbala and in Jan Komasa's 2019 film Corpus Christi.

== Personal life ==
He is married to Ilona Wrońska with whom he has two children: daughter Natasha (born 2006) and son Kajetan (born 2008). He is a fan and popularizer of snooker.

== Films ==
- 2023: Forgotten Love as Professor Rafal Wilczur/Antoni
- 2022: Hold Tight
- 2019: Corpus Christi as Mayor
- 2015: Karbala
- 2014: Wataha (original production of HBO Poland) as Wiktor Rebrow
- 2009: Generał Nil as "Klemm"
- 2007: Odwróceni as Łukasz Ozga
- 2007: Świadek koronny
- 2006: Apetyt na miłość as Lichota
- 2005: Niania (Polish version of The Nanny as Juliusz Wilczur
- 2005: Dzień dobry kochanie as a priest
- 2005–2007: Egzamin z życia as Jacek Bednarz
- 2004: Caméra Café as a firefighter
- 2003–2008, 2009-: Na Wspólnej as Grzegorz Zięba
- 2003: Cyrano
- 2002–2007: Samo Życie
- 2002: Edward II as Leicester
- 2001: Przedwiośnie as Officer
- 2001: Quo vadis
- 2001: Marszałek Piłsudski
- 2000–2001: Miasteczko
- 1999: Patrzę na ciebie, Marysiu as a student

== Polish dubbing ==
- Fantastic Four: World's Greatest Heroes (2006) – Mister Fantastic
- Danny Phantom (2004–2007)
