= Rose (2011 film) =

Polish historical drama movie

- Film poster
- Polish: Róża
- Directed by: Wojciech Smarzowski
- Written by: Michał Szczerbic
- Produced by: Włodzimierz Niderhaus
- Starring: Marcin Dorociński; Agata Kulesza; Kinga Preis; Jacek Braciak; Malwina Buss; Marian Dziędziel; Edward Linde Lubaszenko; Eryk Lubos; Lech Dyblik; Szymon Bobrowski; Andrzej Konopka
- Cinematography: Piotr Sobociński Jr
- Edited by: Paweł Laskowski
- Music by: Mikołaj Trzaska
- Production company: Warsaw Documentary Film Studio
- Release dates: 9 June 2011 (Gdynia Polish Film Festival); 3 February 2012 (Poland)
- Running time: 94 minutes
- Country: Poland
- Languages: Polish; German; Russian
- Budget: zl 5,302,677
- Box office: 2,339,514 $

Rose (Polish: Róża) is a 2011 Polish film directed by Wojciech Smarzowski. It depicts the story of a Masurian woman and an officer of the Armia Krajowa in postwar Masuria.

== Plot ==
In summer 1945 Tadeusz, an officer of the Armia Krajowa and veteran of the Warsaw Uprising, whose wife, a field medic, was raped and killed by the Germans in front of him during that time, moves to Masuria, a region in former German East Prussia, which became part of Poland as a result of the Potsdam Agreement after World War II. He visits Róża, a widow of a German Wehrmacht soldier whose death Tadeusz had witnessed, to hand over her husband’s possessions. Róża invites Tadeusz to stay at her farm to protect her against marauders and the brutal rapes she had previously experienced during the Soviet East Prussian Offensive and in the lawless atmosphere of postwar Masuria. From this partnership of purpose, slowly respect and love arises - a "frowned-upon relationship" attracting unwelcome attention of the Soviet and Soviet-created local ‘security services’.

While Róża is regarded a German by the new Polish authorities, thus facing her expulsion, Tadeusz wants her to declare her Polish nationality as many Masurians did in a "humiliating nationality verification procedure"

As director Wojciech Smarzowski calls it, the Masurians "fell victim to two instances of renationalisation and were later destroyed".

== Cast ==
- Agata Kulesza as Róża Kwiatkowska
- Marcin Dorociński as Tadeusz
- Edward Linde-Lubaszenko as pastor
- Szymon Bobrowski as Kazik
- Jacek Braciak as Władek
- Malwina Buss as Jadwiga Kwiatkowska
- Kinga Preis as Amelia
- Marian Dziędziel as Mateusz
- Eryk Lubos as Wasyl
- Lech Dyblik as Woźniak
- Robert Wabich as Hawryluk
- Grzegorz Wojdon as Madecki
- Mateusz Trembaczowski as Georg

== Reception ==
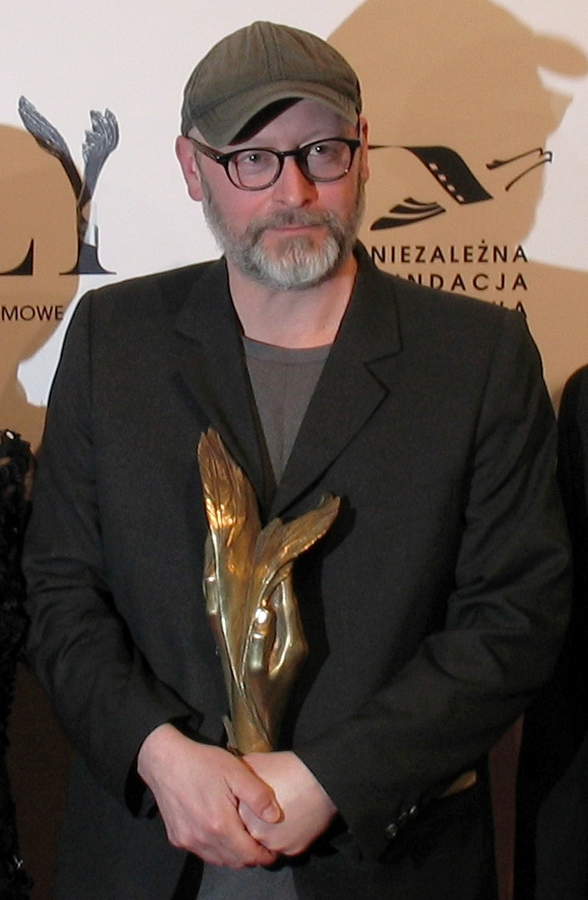
Wojciech Smarzowski with the Polish Academy Award for Best Film, 2012

Variety has called the movie "almost unbearably brutal yet hauntingly romantic" and commended "Genre-savvy helmer Smarzowski's gritty mise-en-scene augments the force of the narrative, putting into visual terms its themes of ill-fated love and a nation doomed by nationalism. What in other hands might have played as costume melodrama focused on the victimized title character here takes the perspective of the loner hero, as Smarzowski gives the pic the hallmarks of a latter-day Western."

Giuseppe Sedia in a review for the Krakow Post wrote: "From a moral point of view Róża is a Western crammed with violence but filmed without complacency. Smarzowski referred to himself as the “third Cohen brother” and there may be a kernel of truth in this, at least in his commitment to injecting a dose of realism into movie genres that have never been fully developed in Polish cinema"."

Róża distribution in Russia has been banned by authorities in 2015 for depicting rapes and other atrocities committed by Red Army soldiers in East Prussia.

== Awards ==
- Grand Prix, Warsaw Film Festival 2011
- Polish Film Awards: Best Film, Best Directing, Best Actress, Best Supporting Actor, Best Script, Best Sound and the Audience Award
- Critics' Award National Film Festival in Gdynia 2011
- Special Jury Prize of the 23rd Polish Film Festival in America for Artistic Excellence and Importance
