= I'm a Killer =

- Directed by: Maciej Pieprzyca
- Written by: Maciej Pieprzyca
- Produced by: Renata Czarnkowska-Listos; Maria Golos
- Starring: Mirosław Haniszewski; Arkadiusz Jakubik; Agata Kulesza; Magdalena Popławska; Piotr Adamczyk; Karolina Staniec
- Cinematography: Paweł Dyllus
- Edited by: Leszek Starzyński
- Music by: Bartosz Chajdecki
- Production companies: RE Studio; Telewizja Polska; Monternia; Agora SA; Silesia Film
- Release dates: 20 September 2016 (Gdynia Film Festival); 4 November 2016
- Running time: 117 minutes
- Country: Poland
- Language: Polish
- Box office: $578 768

I'm a Killer (Polish: Jestem mordercą) is a 2016 Polish crime film written and directed by Maciej Pieprzyca. It is based on the case of the serial killer Zdzisław Marchwicki.

== Plot ==
The main character of the film, Janusz Jasiński, is a young lieutenant of the Citizens' Militia. As the investigation into the female serial killer is at a standstill so far, Jasinski is appointed the new head of the investigation group. He tries to do everything to seize a life chance and catch a serial killer. After a circumstantial investigation, under the pressure of his superiors, he indicates a suspect in the person of Wiesław Kalicki, who still does not plead guilty. As the trial progresses, Jasiński basked in fame, ignoring testimony that could provide evidence pointing to a possible real murderer. Jasiński's opportunism triumphs over his doubts, and Kalicki is sentenced to death. Soon Jasiński's professional career and personal life collapse. In the last scene, Jasiński attends an exhibition showing the cast face of Kalicki; the reflection of the policeman on the site merges with the image of the alleged murderer.

== Cast ==
- Mirosław Haniszewski as Janusz Jasiński, a determined young detective who leads the manhunt for Poland's first official serial killer
- Arkadiusz Jakubik as Wiesław Kalicki, a labourer who is forced into signing a confession to being a serial killer
- Agata Kulesza as Lidia Kalicka
- Magdalena Popławska as Teresa Jasińska
- Piotr Adamczyk as Aleksander Stępski
- Karolina Staniec as Anka

== Reception ==
Deborah Young of The Hollywood Reporter said that the film utilises "quality tech work ... to create a barely colored world of bureaucracy and shadows", describing it as a "classic think piece slipped into an accessible genre".

I'm a Killer has been positively received by critics. The direction of Pieprzyca and the acting of Haniszewski and Jakubik were praised. The film was awarded many times, including the award for directing at the Shanghai International Film Festival and the Silver Lions at the Gdynia Film Festival. At the Polish Film Award I'm a Killer, was nominated in nine categories, but only the supporting roles – Jakubik and Agata Kulesza – received statuettes.

=== Accolades ===
Year	Awards ceremony / Film festival	Category	Recipient(s)	Result	Ref(s)
2016	Gdynia Film Festival	Silver Lions	I'm a Killer	Won	
2016	Gdynia Film Festival	Best Screenplay	Maciej Pieprzyca	Won	
2017	Polish Film Awards: Eagles	Best Supporting Actress	Agata Kulesza	Won	
2017	Polish Film Awards: Eagles	Best Supporting Actor	Arkadiusz Jakubik	Won	
2017	Cottbus Film Festival	Best Director	Maciej Pieprzyca	Won	
2017	Cottbus Film Festival	Outstanding Actor	Mirosław Haniszewski	Won	
2017	Shanghai International Film Festival	Best Director	Maciej Pieprzyca	Won	
