= Tomasz Sapryk =

Polish actor

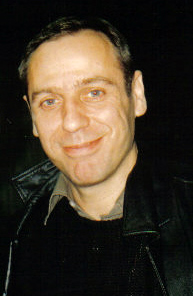

Tomasz Sapryk (born 17 November 1966 in Warsaw, Polish People’s Republic) is a Polish actor. He appeared in the television series Aby do świtu... in 1992 and in the film The Hexer in 2002. In 2007, he won a Polish Film Award Eagle for Best Supporting Actor (Najlepsza Drugoplanowa Rola Meska) in Sztuczki (a Polish comedy drama).
