= Clergy (film) =

2018 Polish drama film by Wojciech Smarzowski

- Film poster
- Polish: Kler
- Directed by: Wojciech Smarzowski
- Written by: Wojciech Smarzowski; Wojciech Rzehak
- Produced by: Jacek Rzehak
- Starring: Arkadiusz Jakubik; Robert Więckiewicz; Jacek Braciak
- Cinematography: Tomasz Madejski
- Edited by: Pawel Laskowski
- Music by: Mikolaj Trzaska
- Production companies: Profil Film; Showmax; Kino Świat
- Distributed by: Kino Świat
- Release dates: 18 September 2018 (Gdynia Polish Film Festival); 28 September 2018 (Poland)
- Running time: 133 minutes
- Country: Poland
- Language: Polish
- Box office: $29,913,342

Clergy (Polish: Kler) is a 2018 Polish drama film co-written and directed by Wojciech Smarzowski. The film stars Arkadiusz Jakubik, Robert Więckiewicz and Jacek Braciak as three priests united by an event that almost took their lives.

== Synopsis ==
Three priests meet on the same date of a past event that could have taken their lives.

== Cast ==
- Arkadiusz Jakubik as Priest Andrzej Kukula
- Robert Więckiewicz as Priest Tadeusz Trybus
- Jacek Braciak as Priest Leszek Lisowski
- Joanna Kulig as Hanka Tomala
- Janusz Gajos as Archbishop Mordowicz
- Adrian Zaremba as Vicar Jan
- Magdalena Celówna-Janikowska as Natalia
- Antoni Barłowski as Czekaj
- Jacek Beler as Priest Petarda
- Stanisław Brejdygant as Priest Teodor
- Bartosz Bielenia as Toady

== Release ==
=== Box office ===
Clergy was wide released in Poland on 28 September 2018 and grossed $29,913,342, breaking several box office records. About 935,000 viewers watched the film in its opening weekend, the best opening for a Polish film in Poland in 30 years.

=== Reception ===
Mike McCahill from The Guardian gave the film three out of five stars, stating: "Controversial in its native Poland, this ambitious drama skilfully shows its clerical cast are as much victims as villains". Richard Lewis writing for the "Wroclaw Uncut" gave Clergy a good review saying: "It's an interesting and topical film made by the leading faces of Polish cinema and will only increase the growing stature of Polish film around the world. It holds no punches and has got people talking about some difficult issues. It is amusing and shocking in equal measure. It is certainly a zeitgeist moment and I recommend you see it". However, Lewis also criticized some aspects of the movie: "The characters are a bit thin and their deeper psychological motivations are largely unexplored. Some of the plot twists and turns become somewhat difficult to follow towards the end and I think perhaps half-an-hour could have been shaved off the running time".

=== Accolades ===
Clergy received several awards and nominations.

| Award | Subject | Nominee | Result |
|---|---|---|---|
| Association of Polish Filmmakers Critics Awards | Best Polish Film | Wojciech Smarzowski | Won |
| Polish Film Awards | Best Film (Najlepszy Film) | Wojciech Smarzowski | Nominated |
| Polish Film Awards | Best Director (Najlepsza Rezyseria) | Wojciech Smarzowski | Nominated |
| Polish Film Festival | Best Film - Audience Award | Wojciech Smarzowski | Won |
| Polish Film Festival | Best Feature Film - Award of Festivals and Reviews of the Polish Film Abroad | Wojciech Smarzowski | Won |
| Polish Film Festival | Best Production Design | Jagna Janicka | Won |
| Polish Film Festival | Best Film - Don Kichot - Award of the Polish Federation of Film Discussion Clubs | Wojciech Smarzowski | Won |
| Polish Film Festival | Best Film - Journalists Awards | Wojciech Smarzowski | Won |
| Polish Film Festival | Main Competition | Wojciech Smarzowski | Won |
| Polish Film Festival | Best Film - Golden Lion | Wojciech Smarzowski | Nominated |

== Controversy ==
In Poland, Clergy, which explores polemic themes such as child abuse, corruption, and alcoholism in the Catholic Church in Poland, was "highly controversial" upon its release and it was heavily criticized by several right-wing and nationalist groups in the Polish society, including the Polish government that was at the time led by the conservative and pro-clerical party, Law and Justice.

== Sequel ==
A sequel is planned, with a budget of 20 million euros, and an Italian co-production with a possible plot about the Vatican.
