= Wojciech Smarzowski =

Polish screenwriter and director

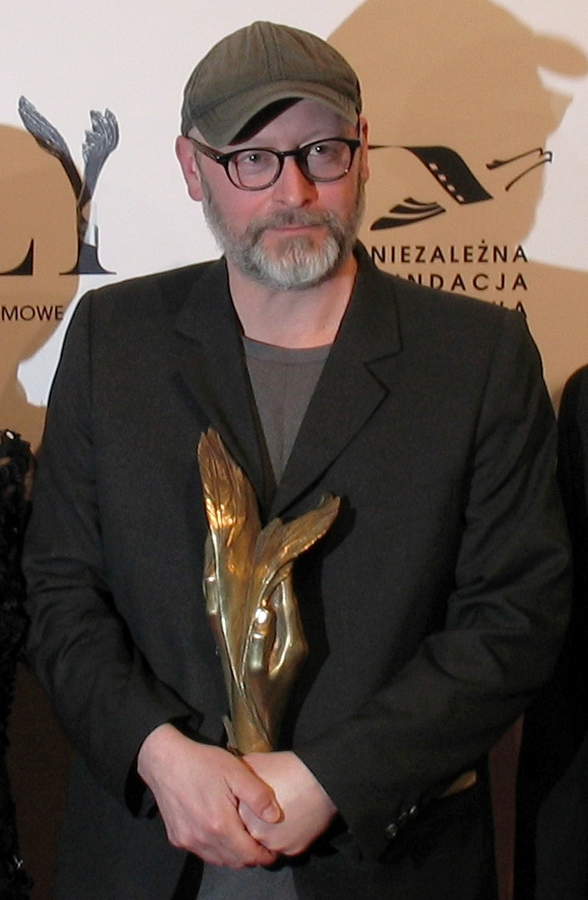
- Born: January 18, 1963 (age 63); Korczyna, Polish People’s Republic
- Occupations: film and theatre director, screenwriter
- Awards: Order of Polonia Restituta; Medal for Merit to Culture – Gloria Artis

Wojciech Smarzowski (born 18 January 1963 in Korczyna near Krosno) is a Polish screenwriter and director.

== Education and Career ==
He studied filmmaking at the Jagiellonian University and the National Film School in Łódź (1990). His 2004 film, The Wedding (not to be confused with the Andrzej Wajda film of the same title) earned special jury mention at the Karlovy Vary International Film Festival in 2005. He began his film career as a video camera operator.

Smarzowski’s film Róża gained the Polish Film Award in seven categories in 2011. His film Traffic Department (2013) tells the story of seven policemen from Warsaw - colleagues and good friends whose lives change after one of them dies in mysterious circumstances. It competed in the main competition section of the 35th Moscow International Film Festival.

Kler (2018) was described by Anne Applebaum in The Washington Post as "a searing, painful film that condemns the Polish Catholic Church as corrupt and hypocritical". In its first weekend after opening, it broke box-office records in Poland and, after three weeks had been seen by 3 1/2 million people, about 10% of Poland's population.

== Filmography ==
=== Feature films ===
==== Director and screenwriter ====
- Sezon na leszcza, 2000 - screenwriter only
- The Wedding (Wesele), 2004
- The Dark House (Dom zły), 2009
- Rose (Róża), 2011 - director only
- Traffic Department (Drogówka), 2013
- The Mighty Angel (Pod Mocnym Aniołem), 2014
- Volhynia (Wołyń), 2016
- Clergy (Kler), 2018
- The Wedding (Wesele), 2021
- Home Sweet Home (Dom dobry) (2025)

=== Television ===
==== Director ====
- Małżowina, 1998 - TV movie
- Kuracja, 2001 - Teleplay
- Na Wspólnej, 2003-2008 - TV series (125 episodes)
- Klucz, 2004 - Teleplay
- Cztery kawałki tortu, 2006 - Teleplay
- BrzydUla, 2008-2009 - TV series (25 episodes)
- The Londoners - TV series (8 episodes)
- Bez tajemnic, 2013 - TV series (7 episodes)

== Orders and decorations ==
- Knight's Cross of the Order of Polonia Restituta (decreed by Polish President Bronislaw Komorowski on May 16, 2014 for outstanding contributions to Polish culture, for achievements in creative work and artistic activity; decorated May 26, 2014).
- Silver Medal for "Meritorious Service to Culture Gloria Artis" (2014).

== See also ==
- Cinema of Poland
