= Taniec z gwiazdami season 13 =

Season of television series

Taniec z gwiazdami
- Season 13
- Hosted by: Piotr Gąsowski; Natasza Urbańska
- Judges: Iwona Pavlović; Janusz Józefowicz; Jolanta Fraszyńska; Piotr Galiński
- Celebrity winner: Kacper Kuszewski
- Professional winner: Anna Głogowska

Release
- Original network: TVN
- Original release: 4 September – 27 November 2011

Season chronology
- ← Previous; 12 Next → 14

The 13th season of Taniec z Gwiazdami, the Polish edition of Dancing with the Stars, started on 4 September 2011 and ended in November 2011. It was broadcast by TVN. Piotr Gąsowski and Natasza Urbańska were the hosts. Iwona Szymańska-Pavlović and Piotr Galiński returned as judges, and replacing Beata Tyszkiewicz and Zbigniew Wodecki, were Jolanta Fraszyńska and Janusz Józefowicz.

On 27 November, Kacper Kuszewski and his partner Anna Głogowska were crowned the champions.

== Couples ==
Celebrity	Occupation	Professional partner	Status
Zbigniew Urbański	TVN Turbo Presenter	Izabela Janachowska	Eliminated 1st on 4 September 2011
Marta Krupa	Model & Joanna Krupa's sister	Przemysław Juszkiewicz	Eliminated 2nd on 11 September 2011
Kazimierz Mazur	Na Wspólnej actor	Bianka Żubrowska	Eliminated 3rd on 18 September 2011
Stanisław Karpiel-Bułecka	Future Folk singer	Magdalena Soszyńska-Michno	Eliminated 4th on 25 September 2011
Anna Wendzikowska	Actress & television presenter	Michał Stukan; Michał Uryniuk (Week 13)	Eliminated 5th on 2 October 2011
Dariusz Kordek	Actor & singer	Blanka Winiarska	Eliminated 6th on 9 October 2011
Aleksandra Kisio	Prosto w serce actress	Łukasz Czarnecki	Eliminated 7th on 16 October 2011
Jagna Marczułajtis-Walczak	Olympic snowboarder	Krzysztof Hulboj	Eliminated 8th on 23 October 2011
Katarzyna Pakosińska	Comedian and actress	Stefano Terrazzino	Eliminated 9th on 30 October 2011
Michał Szpak	Singer & X Factor runner-up	Paulina Biernat	Eliminated 10th on 6 November 2011
Katarzyna Zielińska	Film and television actress	Rafał Maserak; Adam Król (Week 13)	Eliminated 11th on 13 November 2011
Weronika Marczuk	Actress & You Can Dance: Po prostu tańcz! former judge	Jan Kliment	Third place on 20 November 2011
Bilguun Ariunbaatar	Comedian and television presenter	Janja Lesar	Second place on 27 November 2011
Kacper Kuszewski	M jak miłość actor	Anna Głogowska	Winners on 27 November 2011

== Scores ==
Couple	Place	1	2	3	4	5	6	7	8	9	10	11	12	13
Kacper & Anna	1	35†	—	38†	39	33	30	40†	38	36†	29+38=67	38+37=75†	35+39=74	40+30+40=110‡
Bilguun & Janja	2	34	—	33	40†	27	36	33	40†	35	35+40=75†	31+40=71	39+40=79†	40+40+40=120†
Weronika & Jan	3	—	34	21	32	31	33	37	36	26	32+40=72	33+39=72	36+32=68‡	
Katarzyna & Rafał	4	—	33	38†	39	37†	37	38	34	34	32+36=68	33+36=69‡		
Michał & Paulina	5	26	—	21	26‡	26	32	25‡	33	13‡	13+21=34‡			
Katarzyna & Stefano	6	—	25	23	27	36	40†	38	33	34				
Jagna & Krzysztof	7	—	19‡	18	31	21‡	34	32	26‡					
Aleksandra & Łukasz	8	—	28	16‡	26‡	28	18‡	28						
Dariusz & Blanka	9	31	—	33	39	35	31							
Anna & Michał	10	—	36†	33	35	32								
Stanisław & Magdalena	11	26	—	32	31									
Kazimierz & Bianka	12	18	—	23										
Marta & Przemysław	13	—	31											
Zbigniew & Izabela	14	13‡												

Red numbers indicate the lowest score for each week.
Green numbers indicate the highest score for each week.
indicates the couple eliminated that week.
indicates the returning couple that finished in the bottom two.
indicates the winning couple of the week.
indicates the runner-up of the week.
indicates the third place couple of the week.

Notes:

Week 1: Kacper Kuszewski scored 35 out of 40 for his cha-cha-cha, making it the highest score in this episode. There was a record in this episode: Zbigniew Urbański got the lowest score in the history of the show, scoring 13 out of 40 for his cha-cha-cha. It was also the lowest score ever for cha-cha-cha. He was eliminated.

Week 2: Anna Wendzikoska scored 36 out of 40 for her rumba, making it the highest score in this episode. Jagna Marczułajtis-Walczak got 19 points for her quickstep, making it the lowest score of the week. Marta & Przemysław were eliminated despite being 12 points from the bottom.

Week 3: Kacper Kuszewski and Katarzyna Zielińska scored 38 out of 40 for their tango, making it the highest score in this episode. Aleksandra Kisio got 16 points for her tango, making it the lowest score of the week. It was also the lowest score ever for the tango. Kazimierz & Bianka were eliminated despite being 7 points from the bottom.

Week 4: Bilguun Ariunbaatar received the first perfect score of the season for his foxtrot. There was a three-way tie for second place, with Dariusz Kordek, Katarzyna Zielińska and Kacper Kuszewski all getting 39 out of 40. Aleksandra Kisio and Michał Szpak got 26 points for their Paso Doble, making it the lowest score of the week. Stanisław & Magdalena were eliminated despite being 5 points from the bottom.

Week 5: Katarzyna Zielińska scored 37 out of 40 for her Viennese Waltz, making it the highest score in this episode. Jagna Marczułajtis-Walczak got 21 points for her samba, making it the lowest score of the week. Anna & Michał were eliminated despite being 11 points from the bottom.

Week 6: Katarzyna Pakosińska received her first perfect score for waltz in American Smooth. Aleksandra Kisio got 18 points for her salsa, making it the lowest score of the week. Dariusz & Blanka were eliminated despite being 13 points from the bottom.

Week 7: All couples danced to songs from famous movies about crime. Kacper Kuszewski received his first perfect score for his jive. Michał Szpak got 25 points for his foxtrot, making it the lowest score of the week. Aleksandra & Łukasz were eliminated despite being 5 points from the bottom.

Week 8: All couples danced to songs from 1920s & 1930s movies. Bilguun Ariunbaatar received his second perfect score for the tango. Jagna Marczułajtis-Walczak got 26 points for her cha-cha-cha, making it the lowest score of the week. Jagna & Krzysztof were eliminated.

Week 9: All couples danced to the most famous pop songs. There was a record in this episode: Michał Szpak got the lowest score in the history of the show, scoring 13 out of 40 for his jive. It was also the lowest score ever for jive. Zbigniew Urbański also got 13 points for his cha-cha-cha in Week 1 Season 13. Kacper Kuszewski scored 36 out of 40 for his rumba, making it the highest Week 9 score in this episode. Katarzyna & Stefano were eliminated despite being 21 points from the bottom.

Week 10: Michał Szpak got the lowest score in the history of the show, scoring 13 out of 40 for his quickstep. He also got 13 points for his jive in Week 10. It was also the lowest score ever for quickstep. Weronika Marczuk received her first perfect score for her rumba. Bilguun Ariunbaatar received his third perfect score for the samba. Michał & Paulina were eliminated.

Week 11: Bilguun Ariunbaatar received his 4th perfect score for the waltz. Katarzyna & Rafał were eliminated.

Week 12: Bilguun Ariunbaatar received his 5th perfect score for the Argentine tango. Bilguun Ariunbaatar was in the bottom two for the first time in the competition. Weronika & Jan were eliminated. That was the 3rd time when Jan Kliment finished at 3rd place (also in Season 11 with Katarzyna Grochola and in Season 12 with Edyta Górniak).

Week 13: Bilguun Ariunbaatar got 120 out of 120 points. Both couples had to perform three dances: their favorite Latin dance, their favorite ballroom dance and a freestyle. There was a record in this episode: Kacper Kuszewski got the lowest score in history of the finale of the show, scoring 30 out of 40 for his Viennese Waltz. Kacper & Anna won the competition, having cast 52.68 percent of the votes. This is the second time the season's winner was second place on the judges' general scoreboard and the 7th time the winner was not first place according to the judges' scoreboard. Kacper Kuszewski became the 4th man in history to win the program since Krzysztof Tyniec won Season 5 of the show. For the third time in the history of the program in the final there were two men (also in Season 5 and Season 1).

== Average scores ==
Rank by average	Place	Couple	Average	Total	Best score	Worst score
1	2	Bilguun Ariunbaatar & Janja Lesar	36.6	623	40	27
2	1	Kacper Kuszewski & Anna Głogowska	36.2	615	40	29
3	4	Katarzyna Zielińska & Rafał Maserak	35.6	427	39	32
4	10	Anna Wendzikowska & Michał Stukan	34.0	136	36	32
5	9	Dariusz Kordek & Blanka Winiarska	33.8	169	39	31
6	3	Weronika Marczuk & Jan Kliment	33.0	462	40	21
7	6	Katarzyna Pakosińska & Stefano Terrazzino	32.0	256	40	23
8	13	Marta Krupa & Przemysław Juszkiewicz	31.0	31	31	31
9	11	Stanisław Karpiel-Bułecka & Magdalena Soszyńska-Michno	29.7	89	32	26
10	7	Jagna Marczułajtis-Walczak & Krzysztof Hulboj	25.9	181	34	18
11	8	Aleksandra Kisio & Łukasz Czarnecki	24.0	144	28	16
12	5	Michał Szpak & Paulina Biernat	23.6	236	33	13
13	12	Kazimierz Mazur & Bianka Żubrowska	20.5	41	23	18
14	14	Zbigniew Urbański & Izabela Janachowska	13.0	13	13	13
All couples			29.8	1399		

== Couples' highest and lowest scoring dances ==
Couples	Average score	Best dances	Worst dances
Bilguun & Janja	36.6	Foxtrot, Tango, Samba (twice), Waltz (twice), Argentine Tango, Freestyle (40)	Samba (27)
Kacper & Anna	36.2	Jive, Cha-cha-cha, Freestyle (40)	Viennese Waltz (29)
Katarzyna & Rafał	35.6	Paso Doble (39)	Quickstep (32)
Anna & Michał	34.0	Rumba (36)	Viennese Waltz (32)
Dariusz & Blanka	33.8	Foxtrot (39)	Waltz, American Smooth Quickstep (31)
Weronika & Jan	33.0	Rumba (40)	Tango (21)
Katarzyna & Stefano	32.0	American Smooth Waltz (40)	Jive (23)
Marta & Przemysław	31.0	Quickstep (31)	Quickstep (31)
Stanisław & Magdalena	29.7	Jive (32)	Cha-cha-cha (26)
Jagna & Krzysztof	25.9	American Smooth Waltz (34)	Jive (18)
Aleksandra & Łukasz	24.0	Rumba, Viennese Waltz, Cha-cha-cha (28)	Tango (16)
Michał & Paulina	23.6	Rumba (33)	Jive, Quickstep (13)
Kazimierz & Bianka	20.5	Tango (23)	Cha-cha-cha (18)
Zbigniew & Izabela	13.0	Cha-cha-cha (13)	Cha-cha-cha (13)

== Highest and lowest scoring performances ==
The best and worst performances in each dance according to the judges' marks are as follows:

Dance	Best dancer	Best score	Worst dancer	Worst score
Cha-cha-cha	Kacper Kuszewski	40	Zbigniew Urbański	13
Waltz	Bilguun Ariunbaatar	40	Michał Szpak	26
Rumba	Weronika Marczuk	40	Aleksandra Kisio	28
Quickstep	Kacper Kuszewski	38	Michał Szpak	13
Tango	Bilguun Ariunbaatar	40	Aleksandra Kisio	16
Jive	Kacper Kuszewski	40	Michał Szpak	13
Paso Doble	Katarzyna Zielińska; Kacper Kuszewski	39	Michał Szpak	21
Foxtrot	Bilguun Ariunbaatar	40	Michał Szpak	25
Samba	Bilguun Ariunbaatar	40	Jagna Marczułajtis-Walczak	21
Viennese Waltz	Katarzyna Zielińska	37	Michał Szpak	26
Salsa	Weronika Marczuk	39	Aleksandra Kisio	18
American Smooth Waltz	Katarzyna Pakosińska	40	Jagna Marczułajtis-Walczak	34
American Smooth Quickstep	Bilguun Ariunbaatar	36	Dariusz Kordek	31
American Smooth Foxtrot	Kacper Kuszewski	30		
Argentine tango	Bilguun Ariunbaatar	40	Weronika Marczuk	36
Freestyle	Bilguun Ariunbaatar; Kacper Kuszewski	40		

== Episodes ==
Unless indicated otherwise, individual judges' scores in the charts below (given in parentheses) are listed in this order from left to right: Iwona Szymańska-Pavlović, Janusz Józefowicz, Jolanta Fraszyńska and Piotr Galiński.

=== Week 1 ===
Running order

Couple	Score	Dance	Music	Result
Stanisław & Magdalena	26 (6,5,10,5)	Cha-cha-cha	"Corazón espinado" — Carlos Santana	Safe
Dariusz & Blanka	31 (7,7,10,7)	Waltz	"Yesterday" — The Beatles	Safe
Kazimierz & Bianka	18 (3,3,10,2)	Cha-cha-cha	"(I Can't Get No) Satisfaction" — The Rolling Stones	Bottom two
Bilguun & Janja	34 (8,8,10,8)	Waltz	"It Is You (I Have Loved)" — Dana Glover	Safe
Zbigniew & Izabela	13 (2,1,9,1)	Cha-cha-cha	"Daddy Cool" — Boney M.	Eliminated
Michał & Paulina	26 (4,7,10,5)	Waltz	"You Are So Beautiful" — Joe Cocker	Safe
Kacper & Anna	35 (8,8,10,9)	Cha-cha-cha	"A Night like This" — Caro Emerald	Safe
Aleksandra & Łukasz; Jagna & Krzysztof; Anna & Michał; Marta & Przemysław; Weronika & Jan; Katarzyna & Stefano; Katarzyna & Rafał	N/A	Group salsa	"La Bomba" — Ricky Martin	

=== Week 2 ===
Running order

Couple	Score	Dance	Music	Result
Aleksandra & Łukasz	28 (5,5,10,8)	Rumba	"Purple Rain" — Prince	Bottom two
Jagna & Krzysztof	19 (3,5,9,2)	Quickstep	"Cha Cha" — Chelo	Safe
Anna & Michał	36 (8,8,10,10)	Rumba	"Like a Virgin" — Madonna	Safe
Marta & Przemysław	31 (5,7,10,9)	Quickstep	"Valerie" — Mark Ronson featuring Amy Winehouse	Eliminated
Weronika & Jan	34 (7,8,10,9)	Rumba	"If I Were a Boy" — Beyoncé	Safe
Katarzyna & Stefano	25 (4,6,10,5)	Quickstep	"Satellite" — Lena Meyer-Landrut	Safe
Katarzyna & Rafał	33 (6,7,10,10)	Rumba	"Diamonds are Forever" — Shirley Bassey	Safe
Stanisław & Magdalena; Dariusz & Blanka; Kazimierz & Blanka; Bilguun & Janja; Michał & Paulina; Kacper & Anna	N/A	Group Swing	"Dance with Me" — Nouvelle Vague	

=== Week 3 ===
Running order

Couple	Score	Dance	Music	Result
Anna & Michał	33 (9,6,9,9)	Tango	Last Tango in Paris theme — Gato Barbieri	Safe
Kazimierz & Bianka	23 (5,4,8,6)	Tango	"Et si tu n'existais pas" — Joe Dassin	Eliminated
Jagna & Krzysztof	18 (2,6,8,2)	Jive	"Monday Morning" — Melanie Fiona	Safe
Aleksandra & Łukasz	16 (1,6,8,1)	Tango	"Objection (Tango)" — Shakira	Safe
Dariusz & Blanka	33 (9,6,9,9)	Jive	"We Belong Together" — Randy Newman	Safe
Weronika & Jan	21 (2,7,10,2)	Tango	"Hey Sexy Lady" — Shaggy	Safe
Stanisław & Magdalena	32 (7,7,10,8)	Jive	"Rock&Rollin' Love" — Afromental	Bottom two
Kacper & Anna	38 (10,8,10,10)	Tango	"El Choclo" — Ángel Villoldo	Safe
Katarzyna & Stefano	23 (4,5,9,5)	Jive	"You Never Can Tell" — Chuck Berry	Safe
Katarzyna & Rafał	38 (10,8,10,10)	Tango	"Tanguera" — Mariano Mores	Safe
Bilguun & Janja	33 (8,6,10,9)	Jive	"Nie bądź taki szybki Bill" — Katarzyna Sobczyk	Safe
Michał & Paulina	21 (1,10,9,1)	Tango	"El Tango del Dosiente" — Grzegorz Sieradzki	Safe

=== Week 4 ===
Running order

Couple	Score	Dance	Music	Result
Weronika & Jan	32 (7,8,9,8)	Paso Doble	"La Campanera" — Aniceto Molina	Safe
Stanisław & Magdalena	31 (8,7,9,7)	Foxtrot	Janosik theme — Jerzy Matuszkiewicz	Eliminated
Aleksandra & Łukasz	26 (5,7,8,6)	Paso Doble	"Don't Let Me Be Misunderstood" – Santa Esmeralda	Safe
Dariusz & Blanka	39 (10,9,10,10)	Foxtrot	"Manhattan" – Ella Fitzgerald	Safe
Michał & Paulina	26 (4,8,9,5)	Paso Doble	"Ramalama (Bang Bang)" – Róisín Murphy	Safe
Jagna & Krzysztof	31 (6,8,9,8)	Foxtrot	"Baby I'm a Fool" — Melody Gardot	Safe
Katarzyna & Rafał	39 (10,9,10,10)	Paso Doble	"It's My Life" — Bon Jovi	Safe
Bilguun & Janja	40 (10,10,10,10)	Foxtrot	"A Wink and a Smile" — Harry Connick Jr.	Safe
Kacper & Anna	39 (10,9,10,10)	Paso Doble	"El Conquistador" — Jose Esparza	Safe
Katarzyna & Stefano	27 (4,8,8,7)	Foxtrot	"Raindrops Keep Fallin' on My Head" — B. J. Thomas	Bottom two
Anna & Michał	35 (6,9,10,10)	Paso Doble	"Ayo Mi Son" — Legin Resel	Safe

=== Week 5 ===
Running order

Couple	Score	Dance	Music	Result
Jagna & Krzysztof	21 (4,5,8,4)	Samba	"El Matador" — Los Fabulosos Cadillacs	Safe
Anna & Michał	32 (8,8,8,8)	Viennese Waltz	"Utopia" — Within Temptation	Eliminated
Kacper & Anna	33 (8,7,9,9)	Samba	"Oblivion" — Matt Pokora	Safe
Aleksandra & Łukasz	28 (6,7,8,7)	Viennese Waltz	"Cry Me Out" — Pixie Lott	Bottom two
Katarzyna & Stefano	36 (10,7,9,10)	Samba	"Aquarela do Brasil" — Ary Barroso	Safe
Michał & Paulina	26 (3,8,8,7)	Viennese Waltz	"Crazy" — Aerosmith	Safe
Dariusz & Blanka	35 (9,7,9,10)	Samba	"Conga" — Gloria Estefan	Safe
Katarzyna & Rafał	37 (7,10,10,10)	Viennese Waltz	"The Killing Moon" — Nouvelle Vague	Safe
Bilguun & Janja	27 (6,7,8,6)	Samba	"Hey Mama" — The Black Eyed Peas	Safe
Weronika & Jan	31 (6,10,9,6)	Viennese Waltz	"Sophie" — Tomasz Szymuś	Safe

=== Week 6 ===
Running order

Couple	Score	Dance	Music	Result
Katarzyna & Stefano	40 (10,10,10,10)	American Smooth Waltz	"Earth Song" — Michael Jackson	Safe
Aleksandra & Łukasz	18 (3,6,7,2)	Salsa	"No Woman, No Cry" — Bob Marley & The Wailers	Safe
Dariusz & Blanka	31 (7,7,9,8)	American Smooth Quickstep	"Bye Bye Love" — The Everly Brothers	Eliminated
Kacper & Anna	30 (8,6,9,7)	American Smooth Foxtrot	"Let's Groove" — Earth, Wind & Fire	Safe
Weronika & Jan	33 (8,9,9,7)	Salsa	"Hotel California" — Eagles	Bottom two
Bilguun & Janja	36 (10,7,10,9)	American Smooth Quickstep	"Puttin' on the Ritz" — Irving Berlin	Safe
Katarzyna & Rafał	37 (10,7,10,10)	Salsa	"Nadie como ella" — Marc Anthony	Safe
Jagna & Krzysztof	34 (7,9,10,8)	American Smooth Waltz	"Just the Way You Are" — Billy Joel	Safe
Michał & Paulina	32 (5,8,9,10)	Salsa	"Vehicle" — The Ides of March	Safe

=== Week 7: Criminal Movies Theme Week ===
Running order

Couple	Score	Dance	Music	Movie	Result
Aleksandra & Łukasz	28 (5,6,9,8)	Cha-cha-cha	"To Live and Die in L.A." — Wang Chung	To Live and Die in L.A.	Eliminated
Jagna & Krzysztof	32 (7,8,9,8)	Tango	Murder on the Orient Express theme — Richard Rodney Bennett	Murder on the Orient Express	Bottom two
Bilguun & Janja	33 (6,9,10,8)	Rumba	"With or Without You" — U2	Match Point	Safe
Weronika & Jan	37 (8,10,10,9)	Waltz	Léon theme — Éric Serra	Léon	Safe
Kacper & Anna	40 (10,10,10,10)	Jive	"Runaway" — Todd Rundgren	Crime Story	Safe
Michał & Paulina	25 (3,7,8,7)	Foxtrot	"Ain't That a Kick in the Head?" — Dean Martin	A Bronx Tale	Safe
Katarzyna & Stefano	38 (10,10,8,10)	Rumba	"Wicked Game" — Chris Isaak	Wild at Heart	Safe
Katarzyna & Rafał	38 (10,9,9,10)	Waltz	"Against All Odds (Take a Look at Me Now)" — Phil Collins	Against All Odds	Safe

=== Week 8: 20s and 30s Movies Theme Week ===
Running order

Couple	Score	Dance	Music	Movie	Result
Kacper & Anna	38 (9,9,10,10)	Waltz	"Smile" — Charlie Chaplin	Modern Times	Safe
Weronika & Jan	36 (8,9,10,9)	Jive	"Umówiłem się z nią na dziewiątą" — Eugeniusz Bodo	Piętro wyżej	Safe
Katarzyna & Stefano	33 (7,8,9,9)	Viennese Waltz	"Over the Rainbow" — Judy Garland	The Wizard of Oz	Bottom two
Jagna & Krzysztof	26 (5,6,9,6)	Cha-cha-cha	"Ach śpij kochanie" — Adolf Dymsza & Eugeniusz Bodo	Paweł i Gaweł	Eliminated
Michał & Paulina	33 (6,9,10,8)	Rumba	"Tara's Theme" — Max Steiner	Gone with the Wind	Safe
Katarzyna & Rafał	34 (8,8,9,9)	Jive	"Już nie zapomnisz mnie" — Aleksander Żabczyński	Zapomniana melodia	Safe
Bilguun & Janja	40 (10,10,10,10)	Tango	"Serce" — Irena Santor	Jolly Fellows	Safe
Jagna & Krzysztof; Bilguun & Janja; Weronika & Jan; Michał & Paulina; Katarzyna & Stefano; Kacper & Anna; Katarzyna & Rafał	N/A	Group Foxtrot	"Summertime" — George Gershwin	Porgy and Bess	

=== Week 9: Female Pop Singers Week ===
Running order

Couple	Score	Dance	Music	Result
Katarzyna & Rafał	34 (9,7,9,9)	Samba	"Hips Don't Lie" — Shakira featuring Wyclef Jean	Safe
Michał & Paulina	13 (1,3,7,2)	Jive	"The Boy Does Nothing" — Alesha Dixon	Bottom two
Katarzyna & Stefano	34 (7,8,10,9)	Paso Doble	"Paparazzi" — Lady Gaga	Eliminated
Weronika & Jan	26 (8,4,9,5)	Cha-cha-cha	"California Gurls" — Katy Perry featuring Snoop Dogg	Safe
Bilguun & Janja	35 (7,9,10,9)	Salsa	"Si ya se acabó" — Jennifer Lopez	Safe
Kacper & Anna	36 (7,9,10,10)	Rumba	"...Baby One More Time" — Britney Spears	Safe
Bilguun & Janja; Weronika & Jan; Michał & Paulina; Katarzyna & Stefano; Kacper & Anna; Katarzyna & Rafał	N/A	Group Viennese Waltz	"One and Only" – Adele	

=== Week 10 ===
Running order

Couple	Score	Dance	Music	Result
Bilguun & Janja	35 (8,8,10,9)	Viennese Waltz	"With a Little Help from My Friends" — Joe Cocker	Safe
Bilguun & Janja	40 (10,10,10,10)	Samba	"La Mucura" — Beto Villa	Safe
Katarzyna & Rafał	32 (8,8,8,8)	Quickstep	"Le Jazz Hot" — Julie Andrews	Safe
Katarzyna & Rafał	36 (8,8,10,10)	Salsa	"La Tortura" — Shakira featuring Alejandro Sanz	Safe
Weronika & Jan	32 (7,9,9,7)	Foxtrot	"As Time Goes By" — Dooley Wilson	Bottom two
Weronika & Jan	40 (10,10,10,10)	Rumba	"Take a Bow" — Rihanna	Bottom two
Kacper & Anna	29 (5,9,10,5)	Viennese Waltz	"Paccionatta" — Tomasz Szymuś	Safe
Kacper & Anna	38 (9,9,10,10)	Cha-cha-cha	"¿Dónde Estabas Tú?" — Omara Portuondo	Safe
Michał & Paulina	13 (2,3,7,1)	Quickstep	"Suddenly I See" — KT Tunstall	Eliminated
Michał & Paulina	21 (3,5,8,5)	Paso Doble	"Casino" — Tomasz Szymuś	Eliminated

=== Week 11 ===
Running order

Couple	Score	Dance	Music	Result
Weronika & Jan	33 (7,8,9,9)	Quickstep	"Faith" — George Michael	Bottom two
Weronika & Jan	39 (10,9,10,10)	Salsa	"Ahora Quien" — Marc Anthony	Bottom two
Bilguun & Janja	31 (7,8,9,7)	Paso Doble	"Zorro Song" — Engelbert Humperdinck	Safe
Bilguun & Janja	40 (10,10,10,10)	Waltz	"If I Ain't Got You" — Alicia Keys	Safe
Kacper & Anna	38 (9,9,10,10)	Quickstep	"Nie dokazuj" — Marek Grechuta	Safe
Kacper & Anna	37 (9,9,10,9)	Paso Doble	"Steam" — Peter Gabriel	Safe
Katarzyna & Rafał	33 (8,8,9,8)	Cha-cha-cha	"Smooth Operator" — Sade	Eliminated
Katarzyna & Rafał	36 (9,8,10,9)	Tango	"Mama Do (Uh Oh, Uh Oh)" — Pixie Lott	Eliminated

=== Week 12 ===
Running order

Couple	Score	Dance	Music	Result
Kacper & Anna	35 (9,8,9,9)	Rumba	"One" — U2	Safe
Kacper & Anna	39 (10,9,10,10)	Argentine Tango	"Tango" — René Dupéré	Safe
Weronika & Jan	36 (8,10,9,9)	Argentine Tango	"Por una Cabeza" — Carlos Gardel	Eliminated
Weronika & Jan	32 (7,8,9,8)	Paso Doble	"España cañí" — Pascual Marquina Narro	Eliminated
Bilguun & Janja	39 (10,9,10,10)	Jive	"Just a Gigolo" — Leonello Casucci	Bottom two
Bilguun & Janja	40 (10,10,10,10)	Argentine Tango	"Libertango" — Ástor Piazzolla	Bottom two

=== Week 13: Final ===
Running order

Couple	Score	Dance	Music	Result
Bilguun & Janja	40 (10,10,10,10)	Samba	"La Mucura" — Beto Villa	Runner-up
Bilguun & Janja	40 (10,10,10,10)	Waltz	"If I Ain't Got You" — Alicia Keys	Runner-up
Bilguun & Janja	40 (10,10,10,10)	Freestyle	"Dziwny jest ten świat" — Czesław Niemen	Runner-up
Kacper & Anna	40 (10,10,10,10)	Cha-cha-cha	"A Night like This" — Caro Emerald	Winner
Kacper & Anna	30 (6,7,10,7)	Viennese Waltz	"Paccionatta" — Tomasz Szymuś	Winner
Kacper & Anna	40 (10,10,10,10)	Freestyle	"Samba przed rozstaniem" — Hanna Banaszak	Winner

Other dances

Couple	Dance	Music
Zbigniew & Izabela	Cha-cha-cha	"Daddy Cool" — Boney M.
Marta & Przemysław	Quickstep	"Valerie" — Mark Ronson featuring Amy Winehouse
Kazimierz & Bianka	Cha-cha-cha	"(I Can't Get No) Satisfaction" — The Rolling Stones
Stanisław & Magdalena	Foxtrot	"Janosik theme" — Jerzy Matuszkiewicz
Anna & Michał	Rumba	"Like a Virgin" — Madonna
Dariusz & Blanka	American Smooth Quickstep	"Bye Bye Love" — The Everly Brothers
Aleksandra & Łukasz	Cha-cha-cha	"To Live and Die in L.A." — Wang Chung
Jagna & Krzysztof	Foxtrot	"Baby I'm a Fool" — Melody Gardot
Katarzyna & Stefano	Rumba	"Wicked Game" — Chris Isaak
Michał & Paulina	Salsa	"Vehicle" — The Ides of March
Katarzyna & Adam	Tango	"Tanguera" — Mariano Mores
Weronika & Jan	Rumba	"Take a Bow" — Rihanna
Zbigniew & Izabela; Marta & Przemysław; Kazimierz & Bianka; Stanisław & Magdalena; Anna & Michał; Dariusz & Blanka; Aleksandra & Łukasz; Jagna & Krzysztof; Katarzyna & Stefano; Michał & Paulina; Katarzyna & Adam; Weronika & Jan	Group Freestyle	"Evacuate the Dancefloor" — Cascada ft. Carlprit
Monika Pyrek & Robert Rowiński (Season 12 champions)	Viennese Waltz	"Where the Wild Roses Grow" — Nick Cave and the Bad Seeds & Kylie Minogue

== Dance schedule ==
The celebrities and professional partners danced one of these routines for each corresponding week.

- Week 1: Cha-cha-cha or waltz (men) & group salsa (women)
- Week 2: Rumba or quickstep (women) & group swing (men)
- Week 3: Jive or tango
- Week 4: Paso Doble or foxtrot
- Week 5: Samba or Viennese Waltz
- Week 6: Salsa or an unlearned ballroom dance in American Smooth style
- Week 7: One unlearned dance (crime film week)
- Week 8: One unlearned dance & group foxtrot (1920s & 1930s movies week)
- Week 9: One unlearned Latin dance & Group Viennese Waltz (contemporary pop music week)
- Week 10: One unlearned ballroom dance & one repeated Latin dance
- Week 11: One unlearned dance & one repeated dance
- Week 12: Argentine tango & one repeated Latin dance
- Week 13: Favorite Latin dance, favorite ballroom dance & freestyle

== Dance chart ==
Couple	1	2	3	4	5	6	7	8		9		10		11		12		13		
Kacper & Anna	Cha-cha-cha	Swing	Tango	Paso Doble	Samba	American Smooth Foxtrot	Jive	Waltz	Foxtrot	Rumba	Viennese Waltz	Viennese Waltz	Cha-cha-cha	Quickstep	Paso Doble	Rumba	Argentine Tango	Cha-cha-cha	Viennese Waltz	Freestyle
Bilguun & Janja	Waltz	Swing	Jive	Foxtrot	Samba	American Smooth Quickstep	Rumba	Tango	Foxtrot	Salsa	Viennese Waltz	Viennese Waltz	Samba	Paso Doble	Waltz	Jive	Argentine Tango	Samba	Waltz	Freestyle
Weronika & Jan	Salsa	Rumba	Tango	Paso Doble	Viennese Waltz	Salsa	Waltz	Jive	Foxtrot	Cha-cha-cha	Viennese Waltz	Foxtrot	Rumba	Quickstep	Salsa	Argentine Tango	Paso Doble			Rumba
Katarzyna & Rafał	Salsa	Rumba	Tango	Paso Doble	Viennese Waltz	Salsa	Waltz	Jive	Foxtrot	Samba	Viennese Waltz	Quickstep	Salsa	Cha-cha-cha	Tango					Tango
Michał & Paulina	Waltz	Swing	Tango	Paso Doble	Viennese Waltz	Salsa	Foxtrot	Rumba	Foxtrot	Jive	Viennese Waltz	Quickstep	Paso Doble							Salsa
Katarzyna & Stefano	Salsa	Quickstep	Jive	Foxtrot	Samba	American Smooth Waltz	Rumba	Viennese Waltz	Foxtrot	Paso Doble	Viennese Waltz									Rumba
Jagna & Krzysztof	Salsa	Quickstep	Jive	Foxtrot	Samba	American Smooth Waltz	Tango	Cha-cha-cha	Foxtrot											Foxtrot
Aleksandra & Łukasz	Salsa	Rumba	Tango	Paso Doble	Viennese Waltz	Salsa	Cha-cha-cha													Cha-cha-cha
Dariusz & Blanka	Waltz	Swing	Jive	Foxtrot	Samba	American Smooth Quickstep														American Smooth Quickstep
Anna & Michał	Salsa	Rumba	Tango	Paso Doble	Viennese Waltz															Rumba
Stanisław & Magdalena	Cha-cha-cha	Swing	Jive	Foxtrot																Foxtrot
Kazimierz & Blanka	Cha-cha-cha	Swing	Tango																	Cha-cha-cha
Marta & Przemysław	Salsa	Quickstep																		Quickstep
Zbigniew & Izabela	Cha-cha-cha																			Cha-cha-cha

Highest scoring dance
Lowest scoring dance
Performed, but not scored

== Weekly results ==
The order is based on the judges' scores combined with the viewers' votes.

Order	Week 1	Week 2	Week 3	Week 4	Week 5	Week 6	Week 7	Week 8	Week 9	Week 10	Week 11	Week 12	Week 13 Final
1	Kacper & Anna	Katarzyna & Rafał	Kacper & Anna	Bilguun & Janja	Kacper & Anna	Jagna & Krzysztof	Kacper & Anna	Bilguun & Janja	Kacper & Anna	Bilguun & Janja	Kacper & Anna	Kacper & Anna	Kacper & Anna
2	Bilguun & Janja	Weronika & Jan	Katarzyna & Rafał	Katarzyna & Rafał	Katarzyna & Rafał	Katarzyna & Rafał	Katarzyna & Stefano	Katarzyna & Rafał	Weronika & Jan	Kacper & Anna	Bilguun & Janja	Bilguun & Janja	Bilguun & Janja
3	Michał & Paulina	Katarzyna & Stefano	Bilguun & Janja	Dariusz & Blanka	Katarzyna & Stefano	Katarzyna & Stefano	Katarzyna & Rafał	Kacper & Anna	Katarzyna & Rafał	Katarzyna & Rafał	Weronika & Jan	Weronika & Jan	
4	Stanisław & Magdalena	Anna & Michał	Michał & Paulina	Kacper & Anna	Michał & Paulina	Michał & Paulina	Michał & Paulina	Michał & Paulina	Bilguun & Janja	Weronika & Jan	Katarzyna & Rafał		
5	Dariusz & Blanka	Jagna & Krzysztof	Weronika & Jan	Michał & Paulina	Bilguun & Janja	Kacper & Anna	Weronika & Jan	Weronika & Jan	Michał & Paulina	Michał & Paulina			
6	Kazimierz & Bianka	Aleksandra & Łukasz	Dariusz & Blanka	Jagna & Krzysztof	Weronika & Jan	Bilguun & Janja	Bilguun & Janja	Katarzyna & Stefano	Katarzyna & Stefano				
7	Zbigniew & Izabela	Marta & Przemysław	Anna & Michał	Weronika & Jan	Dariusz & Blanka	Aleksandra & Łukasz	Jagna & Krzysztof	Jagna & Krzysztof					
8			Katarzyna & Stefano	Anna & Michał	Jagna & Krzysztof	Weronika & Jan	Aleksandra & Łukasz						
9			Aleksandra & Łukasz	Aleksandra & Łukasz	Aleksandra & Łukasz	Dariusz & Blanka							
10			Jagna & Krzysztof	Katarzyna & Stefano	Anna & Michał								
11			Stanisław & Magdalena	Stanisław & Magdalena									
12			Kazimierz & Bianka										

This couple came in first place with the judges.
This couple came in first place with the judges and gained the highest number of viewers' votes.
This couple gained the highest number of viewers' votes.
This couple came in last place with the judges and gained the highest number of viewers' votes.
This couple came in last place with the judges.
This couple came in last place with the judges and was eliminated.
This couple was eliminated.
This couple won the competition.
This couple came in second in the competition.
This couple came in third in the competition.

== Audience voting results ==
The percentage of votes cast by a couple in a particular week is given in parentheses.

Order	Week 1	Week 2	Week 3	Week 4	Week 5	Week 6	Week 7	Week 8	Week 9	Week 10	Week 11	Week 12	Week 13 Final
1	Kacper & Anna (28.22%)	Katarzyna & Stefano (20.23%)	Michał & Paulina (18.7%)	Michał & Paulina (16.75%)	Michał & Paulina (14.72%)	Kacper & Anna (17.29%)	Michał & Paulina (20.28%)	Bilguun & Janja (21.91%)	Weronika & Jan (22.54%)	Kacper & Anna (39.07%)	Kacper & Anna (30.11%)	Kacper & Anna (45.14%)	Kacper & Anna (52.68%)
2	Michał & Paulina (24.55%)	Katarzyna & Rafał (18.8%)	Weronika & Jan (13.01%)	Bilguun & Janja (13.38%)	Bilguun & Janja (14.68%)	Michał & Paulina (16.12%)	Kacper & Anna (17.41%)	Katarzyna & Rafał (18.97%)	Michał & Paulina (20.15%)	Bilguun & Janja (20.96%)	Bilguun & Janja (29.5%)	Bilguun & Janja (35.87%)	Bilguun & Janja (47.32%)
3	Bilguun & Janja (24.39%)	Jagna & Krzysztof (16.59%)	Kacper & Anna (12.48%)	Katarzyna & Rafał (9.85%)	Kacper & Anna (12.52%)	Jagna & Krzysztof (11.48%)	Katarzyna & Stefano (12.9%)	Michał & Paulina (13.95%)	Kacper & Anna (19.82%)	Katarzyna & Rafał (16.10%)	Katarzyna & Rafał (20.63%)	Weronika & Jan (18.99%)	
4	Kazimierz & Bianka (8.18%)	Weronika & Jan (16.35%)	Aleksandra & Łukasz (11.58%)	Dariusz & Blanka (9.53%)	Jagna & Krzysztof (10.94%)	Aleksandra & Łukasz (10.39%)	Katarzyna & Rafał (12.54%)	Kacper & Anna (13.58%)	Katarzyna & Rafał (13.1%)	Weronika & Jan (13.10%)	Weronika & Jan (19.76%)		
5	Stanisław & Magdalena (7.02%)	Aleksandra & Łukasz (10.74%)	Jagna & Krzysztof (9.66%)	Jagna & Krzysztof (8.98%)	Weronika & Jan (10.69%)	Katarzyna & Rafał (9.61%)	Weronika & Jan (11.17%)	Jagna & Krzysztof (12.01%)	Bilguun & Janja (13.05%)	Michał & Paulina (10.77%)			
6	Dariusz & Blanka (4.84%)	Anna & Michał (10.05%)	Bilguun & Janja (8.91%)	Kacper & Anna (8.94%)	Katarzyna & Rafał (10.47%)	Katarzyna & Stefano (9.54%)	Bilguun & Janja (9.86%)	Katarzyna & Stefano (10.21%)	Katarzyna & Stefano (11.34%)				
7	Zbigniew & Izabela (2.8%)	Marta & Przemysław (7.26%)	Katarzyna & Rafał (7.69%)	Aleksandra & Łukasz (8.28%)	Katarzyna & Stefano (8.8%)	Bilguun & Janja (9.25%)	Jagna & Krzysztof (8.41%)	Weronika & Jan (9.37%)					
8			Katarzyna & Stefano (4.71%)	Weronika & Jan (7.92%)	Aleksandra & Łukasz (8.52%)	Weronika & Jan (8.28%)	Aleksandra & Łukasz (7.43%)						
9			Dariusz & Blanka (4.23%)	Katarzyna & Stefano (7.78%)	Dariusz & Blanka (5.5%)	Dariusz & Blanka (8.04%)							
10			Anna & Michał (3.47%)	Anna & Michał (4.46%)	Anna & Michał (3.16%)								
11			Stanisław & Magdalena (2.91%)	Stanisław & Magdalena (4.13%)									
12			Kazimierz & Bianka (2.65%)										

== Guest performances ==
Episode	Date	Artist(s)	Song(s)	Dancer(s)
1	4 September 2011	Natasza Urbańska	"All the Wrong Places"	Studio Buffo theater dancers
2	11 September 2011	Tomasz Szymuś's Orchestra	"Express"	VOLT Dance Group
3	18 September 2011	Irma	"I Know"	VOLT Dance Group
4	25 September 2011	Feel	"Cały ten świat"	–
5	2 October 2011	Sharon Corr	"Over It"	VOLT Dance Group
6	9 October 2011	Melanie C	"Rock Me"	VOLT Dance Group
6	9 October 2011	Melanie C	"Think About It"
7	16 October 2011	Tomasz Szymuś's Orchestra	Theme from The Godfather	Jan Kliment, Stefano Terrazzino, Krzysztof Hulboj, Rafał Maserak, Janja Lesar, Paulina Biernat, Anna Głogowska, Lenka Tvrzova
8	23 October 2011	Tomasz Szymuś's Orchestra	"Babilon" (from Pola Negri musical)	Natasza Urbańska & Studio Buffo theater dancers
9	30 October 2011	Ewa Farna	"Nie przegap"	–
10	6 November 2011	Tomasz Szymuś's Orchestra	"Judas"	VOLT Dance Group
11	13 November 2011	Miss 600	"Twist"	VOLT Dance Group
12	20 November 2011	Tomasz Szymuś's Orchestra	"Valentino" (from Polita musical)	Natasza Urbańska & Stefano Terrazzino
13	27 November 2011	Dionne Bromfield	"Foolin"	VOLT Dance Group

== Rating figures ==
Date	Episode	Official rating 4+	Share 4+	Official rating 16–39	Share 16–39
4 September 2011	1	4,286,482	27.54%	1,720,266	25.24%
11 September 2011	2	4,081,186	26.30%	1,617,378	23.68%
18 September 2011	3	3,960,975	26.23%	1,430,772	20.73%
25 September 2011	4	4,120,271	26.72%	1,503,758	21.20%
2 October 2011	5	3,802,996	24.38%	1,324,572	19.25%
9 October 2011	6	3,539,262	20.81%	1,236,076	16.72%
16 October 2011	7	3,824,196	23.17%	1,238,771	17.29%
23 October 2011	8	4,120,223	24.39%	1,379,331	18.45%
30 October 2011	9	4,181,987	24.96%	1,587,739	20.46%
6 November 2011	10	3,990,285	23.53%	1,371,894	17.71%
13 November 2011	11	4,226,253	25.42%	1,513,486	20.79%
20 November 2011	12	4,574,627	26.78%	1,705,726	23.09%
27 November 2011	13	4,709,919	29.06%	1,747,351	23.95%
Average	Season 13	4,094,982	25.30%	1,483,513	20.57%
