= Majka =

Majka, Slavic-language feminine given name, originally a diminutive of the name Maria or Maja, it can be a spelling variation of Mayka.

== Given name ==
- Majka Jeżowska (born 1960), Polish singer
- Majka Olkowicz, Majka (soap opera) character
- Majka, Dekalog: Seven character
- Mayka Mecheba, (born 1987), Guinean painter and football player
- Mayka Villaverde Freire, The Body (2012 film) character
- Mayka Zima (born 1992), New Caledonian tennis player

== Surname ==
- Jolanta Majka (born 1978), Polish rower
- Marek Majka (born 1959), Polish football manager and player
- Matěj Majka (born 2000), Czech football player
- Rafał Majka (born 1989), Polish road bicycle racer

== Mononym ==
- Majka (rapper) (born 1979 as Péter Majoros), Hungarian rapper

== Other ==
- Majka (soap opera)
- Nizhnyaya Mayka, rural locality (a village) in Mrakovsky Selsoviet, Kugarchinsky District, Bashkortostan, Russia
