= Olimpia Ajakaiye =

Polish interior designer, actress, and television presenter (born 1974)

- Born: 24 July 1974 (age 51); Kraków, Poland
- Education: Jan Matejko Academy of Fine Arts; Pedagogical University of Kraków
- Occupations: Actress, interior designer, television presenter
- Years active: 1998–present
- Spouse: Bogusław Kudłek (m. 2024)
- Children: 1

Olimpia Anna Ajakaiye (born 24 July 1974; English: /ə.d͡ʒɑː.kɑɪː.jeɪ/, Polish: [a.d͡za.kaˈi.jɛ]) is a Polish interior designer, actress and television presenter.

== Biography ==
Olimpia Ajakaiye was born on 24 July 1974 in Kraków, Poland. Ajakaiye graduated from the Faculty of Interior Design of the Jan Matejko Academy of Fine Arts, with a specialisation in furniture design, as well as from the Pedagogical University of Kraków. Her designs are characterised by organic and simple shapes with elements of European minimalism and African styles. The Polish Investment and Trade Agency exhibited her works in Berlin, Hamburg, Helsinki, Geneva, and Madrid to promote Polish design. Ajakaiye also teaches interior design, and organises art events, and children's art classes. Since 2018, together with company AQForm, she develops light fittings.

She also works as an actress, and was in television series such as Klasa na obcasach (1998–2000), Na dobre i na złe (2000), Sukces (2000), Zostać miss (2001), True Law (2005), Na Wspólnej (2007), Julia (2012), Święty (2020), and Na sygnale (2021–2024). In the past she was also a television presenter, among others, hosting shows such as Na gapę for Canal+, Przytul mnie for Polsat, Pytanie na śniadanie for Polish Television, and Good Morning TVN for TVN.

In 2007, she was a brand ambassador of Kraków-based spa and beauty salons Le Premier.

Since 2023, Ajakaiye hosts a YouTube webseries Show Room, in which she showcases interior design, and teaches how to arrange rooms. The programme is produced by KRK FILM.

== Private life ==
In 2024, Ajakaiye married actor Bogusław Kudłek. She has a son.

== Filmography ==
Year	Title	Role	Notes
1998–2000	Klasa na obcasach	Olivia	Television series
2000	Na dobre i na złe	Marysia, dr Diolo's fiancée	Television series; 2 episodes
2000	Sukces	Casting coordinator	Television series
2000	To my		Feature film
2001	Zostać miss	Marzena Romario	Television series
2005	True Law	Julia Szulc's secretary	Television series; episode no. 8
2007	Na Wspólnej	Sabina	Television series; 2 episodes
2012	Julia	TV presenter	Television series; episode no. 90
2020	Święty	Zarina	Television series; 7 episodes
2021–2024	Na sygnale	Afiya Ogrodnik	Television series; main role; 85 episodes
