= Julia (2012 TV series) =

- Genre: soap opera
- Directed by: Arkadiusz Luboń; Sławomir Pstrong; Marcin Solarz; Adrian Kręciszewski
- Starring: Julia Rosnowska; Krystian Wieczorek; Marta Żmuda Trzebiatowska; Michał Lewandowski; Bartosz Obuchowicz
- Theme music composer: Lenka – Trouble Is a Friend
- Composer: Grzegorz Daroń
- Country of origin: Poland
- Original language: Polish
- No. of seasons: 2
- No. of episodes: 186

Production
- Executive producer: Krystyna Lasoń
- Running time: 22-25 minutes

Original release
- Network: TVN
- Release: January 2 – December 14, 2012

Related
- Prosto w serce

Julia is a Polish soap opera. It is broadcast on weekdays on TVN since Monday, January 2, 2012. The pilot episode was broadcast on Friday, December 23, 2011, after the final episode of Prosto w serce (Straight Into the Heart).

== Plot ==
The series follows the fortunes of a young woman, Julia Chmielewska, who gets cold feet before her wedding and decides to start over in Kraków. There she stays with her cousin Katarzyna and her family. She later meets the rich Janicki family, who are the owners of the Beauty Clinic.

== Cast ==
| Actor | Role |
|---|---|
| Julia Rosnowska | Julia Chmielewska |
| Krystian Wieczorek | Jan Janicki |
| Marta Żmuda Trzebiatowska | Monika Miller |
| Michał Lewandowski | Maciej Janicki |
| Bartosz Obuchowicz | Dariusz Nogaj |
| Tadeusz Huk | Tadeusz Janicki |
| Anna Tomaszewska | Hanna Janicka (née Wójtowicz) |
| Aldona Jankowska | Bożena Miller |
| Alina Kamińska | Alicja Chmielewska |
| Gabriela Mazurek | Natalia Chmielewska |
| Ewa Kaim | Katarzyna Baran |
| Grzegorz Mielczarek | Krzysztof Baran |
| Emilia Stachurska | Pola Baran |
| Weronika Humaj | Kaja Baran |
| Maja Bohosiewicz | Anita Ziółkowska |
| Maciej Kosmala | Esteban |
