= Piotr Trzaskalski =

Polish film director and screenwriter (born 1964)

- Born: February 5, 1964 (age 62); Łódź, Poland
- Occupation: film director
- Years active: 2003 -

Piotr Trzaskalski (Polish pronunciation: [ˈpjɔtr tʂasˈkalskʲi]; born February 5, 1964, in Łódź, Poland) is a Polish film director and screenwriter.

== Biography ==
A graduate of the National Film School in Łódź. He is probably best known for his film Edi (2002), which won several awards at the Berlin International Film Festival (2003) in Berlin, Germany, and also won the special Audience Award at the 2003 Polish Film Awards from the Polish Academy. In 2004, he became a member of the European Film Academy.

His later film Mistrz (English: The Master) (2005) won the FIPRESCI Prize at the Miami International Film Festival (2006) in Miami, Florida.

== Selected filmography ==
- 2002: Edi
- 2005: The Master (Mistrz)
- 2005: Długopis w Solidarność, Solidarność...
- 2012: My Father's Bike
