= Majka (TV series) =

- Genre: Soap opera
- Directed by: Jarosław Banaszek; Arkadiusz Luboń; Marcin Solarz; Pedro Gorostiza; Sławomir Pstrong
- Starring: Joanna Osyda; Tomasz Ciachorowski; Marieta Żukowska
- Composer: Łukasz Targosz
- Country of origin: Poland
- Original language: Polish
- No. of episodes: 190

Production
- Executive producer: Krystyna Lasoń
- Running time: 25 minutes

Original release
- Network: TVN
- Release: January 4 – December 23, 2010

Related
- BrzydUla; Prosto w serce; Juana la virgen

Majka is a Polish television soap opera which aired on TVN in 2001. The series stars Joanna Osyda in the title role, as a photography student at the Academy of Fine Arts in Krakow, who unexpectedly becomes pregnant. It was broadcast on weekdays from 4 January 2010, to 23 December 2010, following a pilot episode on 22 December 2009.

The series was popular with viewers. It was an adaptation of the popular Venezuelan soap opera Juana la virgen.

== Plot ==
The series follows the fortunes of Majka Olkowicz, who is a photography student at the Academy of Fine Arts in Kraków and fighting for a scholarship to a prestigious university in Florence. However, an unintended pregnancy destroys these plans. Majka begins work in the Panorama Project company, whose boss is Michał Duszyński, the father of the baby.

== Cast ==
Actor	Role
Joanna Osyda	Majka Olkowicz
Tomasz Ciachorowski	Michał Duszyński
Marieta Żukowska	Aleksandra Duszyńska
Ewa Kaim	Anna Olkowicz
Anna Tomaszewska	Róża Olkowicz
Jakub Bohosiewicz	Piotr Olkowicz
Katarzyna Gniewkowska	Lucyna Duszyńska
Tadeusz Huk	Kazimierz Duszyński
Magdalena Grąziowska	Lila Jędrych
Andrzej Andrzejewski	Stefan Lisowski
Beata Rybotycka	Grażyna Piotrowska
Barbara Wilk	Barbara Duszyńska
Michał Lewandowski	Adam Stankiewicz
Karolina Stefańska	Eliza Wolańska
Gracja Niedźwiedź	Katarzyna Orłow
Bogusław Kudłek	Bartosz Orłow
Marta Ojrzyńska	Sabina Kowalik
Weronika Rosati	Dagmara Szybicka
Andrzej Deskur	Wiktor Olszewski
