= Bangistan =

2015 Indian film by Karan Anshuman

- Theatrical release poster
- Directed by: Karan Anshuman
- Written by: Puneet Krishna; Sumit Purohit; Karan Anshuman
- Produced by: Ritesh Sidhwani; Farhan Akhtar
- Starring: Riteish Deshmukh; Pulkit Samrat; Jacqueline Fernandez
- Cinematography: Szymon Lenkowski
- Music by: Ram Sampath
- Production companies: Junglee Pictures; Excel Entertainment
- Distributed by: AA Films
- Release date: 7 August 2015
- Running time: 135 minutes
- Country: India
- Language: Hindi

Bangistan is a 2015 Indian black comedy satirical film directed by Karan Anshuman, produced by Farhan Akhtar and Ritesh Sidhwani, and starring Riteish Deshmukh and Pulkit Samrat, with Jacqueline Fernandez appearing in a cameo. In the film, Hafeez and Praveen, two brainwashed terrorists from conflicting religions, plan to perform a suicide attack at a religious conference in Poland. However, a turn of events saw them change their minds.

The film was scheduled to release on 31 July 2015 but was delayed to 7 August 2015. It was banned by Pakistan's Central Board of Film Censors for depicting suicide bombers.

== Plot ==
The story is set in Bangistan, a fictitious country perpetually beset by violence between Muslims in the north and Hindus in the south.

Hafeez Ali is a Muslim call centre worker who quit his job and became a terrorist after an imam persuaded him to perform a suicide bombing at the World Religious Conference in Kraków, Poland. To cover his identity and relationship with the imam, Hafeez enters Poland as a Hindu named Ishwarchand Sharma.

Praveen Chaturvedi is an extremist kar sevak tasked by his revered godman Guruji to attack the same World Religious Conference. Disguising as a Muslim named Allah Rakha Khan, he and Hafeez quickly befriended each other, shared a hotel in Kraków and fell in love with Rosie, an Indian waitress who would never be seen again.

Hafeez and Praveen buy explosives from arms dealers Bobbitsky and Chang Ping respectively, using them to make bombs in their respective hotel rooms. After Praveen realised that Hafeez's intention of terrorism is just like his own, the two men started working together while also acknowledging how their respective bosses influenced them. However, things turned sour when they revealed each other's true identities, accidentally set off the bomb after a fight and got arrested.

Meanwhile, back in Bangistan, both Guruji and the imam discover their situation and decide to conduct the attack on their own. The latter sends a hitman to kill Hafeez in the hospital, but the police had begun sending him and Praveen to prison until they escaped along the way. Hafeez and Praveen agreed to stop the bombing from going ahead, not knowing that the latter was still in touch with Guruji.

At the conference, Hafeez sees Praveen tying bombs around his body, causing another scuffle that was resolved peacefully. He then snatches another bomb from the imam's henchman only for police to intervene. Amidst the chaos, the terrorist reclaims his bomb and detonates it as Hafeez and Praveen jumped away. However, the resulting blast was too weak and they survived. Bobbitsky sneered: "Useless bomb, must be Chinese" – a claim eventually proven true.

== Cast ==
- Ritesh Deshmukh as Hafeez Ali/Ishwarchand Sharma
- Pulkit Samrat as Praveen Chaturvedi/Allah Rakha Khan
- Jacqueline Fernandez as Rosie
- Tom Alter as the Imam
- Kumud Mishra as Guruji
- Chandan Roy Sanyal as Tamim Iqbal
- Arya Babbar as Zulfi
- Shiv Kumar Subramaniam as Shankaracharya
- Janusz Chabior as Mikhail Bobbitsky
- Jacek Lenartowicz as Mr. Polanski
- Marta Żmuda Trzebiatowska as Katherine Polanski
- Tomasz Karolak as Wilhelm
- Andrzej Blumenfeld as Wilfred
- Bilguun Ariunbaatar as Constable Wong
- Zachary Coffin as Stanislav
- Saharsh Kumar Shukla as Kaaluram
- Vinod Rai as Chang Ping

== Music ==
The soundtrack of the album is composed by Ram Sampath, and lyrics written by Puneet Krishna. The Soundtrack Album of this film was released on July 11, 2015.

No.	Title	Singers	Length
1.	"Ishq Karenge"	Sona Mohapatra, Abhishek Nailwal & Shadab Faridi	04:26
2.	"Hogi Kranti"	Ram Sampath & Abhishek Nailwal	03:08
3.	"Saturday Night"	Aditi Singh Sharma, Benny Dayal, Neeraj Shridhar and Janusz Krucinski	03:40
4.	"Maula"	Ram Sampath & Rituraj Mohanty	04:45
5.	"Meri Zidd"	Ram Sampath & Siddharth Basrur	03:24
6.	"Is Duniya Se Ladna Hai"	Suraj Jagan & Abhishek Nailwal	02:39
7.	"Ishq Karenge (EDM Version)"	Sona Mohapatra, Abhishek Nailwal & Shadab Faridi	04:12
Total length:			18:20

== Marketing and release ==
The film was released on 7 August. Mike McCahill gave it three stars in The Guardian. Bangistan was released on 700 screens in India.
