= Sławomir Pstrong =

- Born: 29 December 1975; Skórcz, Poland
- Died: 23 December 2015 (aged 39); Poland
- Education: University of Silesia in Katowice
- Occupations: Film and television director, screenwriter, author
- Years active: 2003–2015
- Awards: Camerimage Bronze Tadpole (2003); Johnnie Waterman award (2004); Blue Tadpole (2008); Koszalin Audience Award (2010)
- Website: slawek.pstrong.pl

Sławomir Pstrong (29 December 1975, Skórcz, Poland – 23 December 2015) was a Polish film and television director, screenwriter, and author of short stories.

His thesis film for the University of Silesia in Katowice, T-Rex, received awards at multiple festivals (including the Bronze Tadpole at the 2003 Camerimage awards, the Blue Tadpole for the best short film of the decade 1997-2007 at Camerimage 2008, and the Johnnie Waterman award at Prowincjonalia 2004).

He also directed the independent film Plan, among others, honored at the Polish Film Festival in Gdynia in 2010, and in the same year, his other film, Cisza, received the Audience Award at the Koszalin Debut Film Festival "Młodzi i Film".

Pstrong died under tragic circumstances on 23 December 2015.

== Filmography ==
- Szkoła (TV series, 2014)
- Julia (TV series, 2012)
- Majka (TV series, 2010)
- Cisza (2009)
- Plan (2009)
- T-Rex (2003)
