= Marta Żmuda Trzebiatowska =

Polish actress (born 1984)

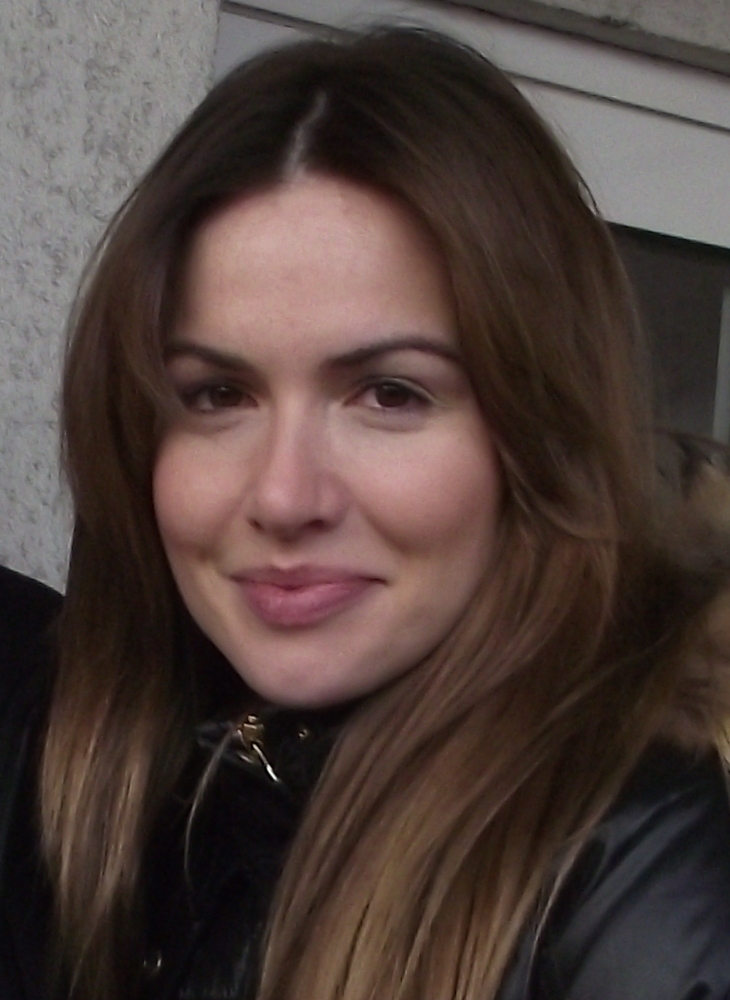
- Żmuda Trzebiatowska in 2014
- Born: July 26, 1984 (age 42); Człuchów, Poland
- Occupation: Actress
- Years active: 2005–present
- Spouse: Kamil Kula (m. 2015)
- Children: 2

Marta Żmuda Trzebiatowska (born 26 July 1984, in Człuchów) is a Polish film, television and theater actress.

== Career ==
She is best known for playing the role of Marta Orkisz in Polish TV series Teraz albo nigdy! and Monika Miller in Julia. She has also appeared in a number of other television series, including Kryminalni (Crime Detectives), Na dobre i na złe (For better and for worse), Magda M., and Twarzą w twarz (Face to Face).

In 2008 she took part in the 8th season of the popular TV show Taniec z gwiazdami (Dancing with the Stars). Her dance partner was Adam Król. They took 3rd place.

== Filmography ==
=== Film ===
Year	English title	Original Title	Role	Notes
2005		Dom niespokojnej starości	Bella	
2007	Winx Club: The Secret of the Lost Kingdom	Winx Club - Il segreto del regno perduto	Flora	Polish dubbing
2008		Nie kłam, kochanie	Ania	
2008		Serce na dłoni	Małgorzata	
2009		Wszystko	Monika	
2010		Ciacho	Basia	
2010		Śluby panieńskie	Klara, Dobrójska's niece	
2011		Och, Karol 2	Paulina	
2011		Wygrany	Kornelia	
2011	Love, Wedding, Marriage		Kasia	
2011		Komisarz Rozen	Ewa Rybaczyńska	
2012		Vocuus	psychologist	
2012		Hans Kloss. Stawka większa niż śmierć	Elza	
2012	Mirror Mirror		Snow White	Polish dubbing
2015		Wkręceni 2	Czesława Zmrażdżycka vel Dolores Madeiros	
2015		Listy do M. 2	Monika	
2015	Bangistan		Katherine Polanski	
2015		Gejsza	Dominika "Velvet"	
2019		Mowa ptaków	Jakubcowa	

=== Television ===
Year	English title	Original Title	Role	Notes
2005	Crime Detectives	Kryminalni	Jagoda Dobroń	ep. 28
2005	For better and for worse	Na dobre i na złe	Dzidka Fryckiewicz, Malwina's sister	ep. 233
2006		Fałszerze – powrót Sfory	Basia, Gozdawa's secretary	ep. 1, 9, 14
2006		Magda M.	Jagoda Rajewska	
2006–2007		Dwie strony medalu	Iza Dorosz	
2007	Face to Face	Twarzą w twarz	Halina "Ola" Słomińska	
2007		Przymierzalnia		show host
2008–2009		Teraz albo nigdy!	Marta Orkisz	
2011		Chichot losu	Joanna Konieczna	
2011		Hotel 52	Alicja	ep. 36
2011–2012	Julia	Julia	Monika Miller	
2014		Ojciec Mateusz	dr Izabela Nejman	ep. 149
2014, 2018		O mnie się nie martw	Monika Kuczyńska	ep. 9; season IX
2015		Przyjaciółki	Natalia	ep. 51-54
2017		Niania w wielkim mieście	Matylda	ep. 12
2018–present	For better and for worse	Na dobre i na złe	dr Hanna Sikorka	
2019	The Mandalorian		Omera	Polish dubbing
2019–present		Blondynka	Sylwia Kubus	from ep. 92, season 8
2019–present	War Girls	Wojenne dziewczyny	"Alosza"	

=== Video games ===
Year	Title	Voice role	Notes
2020	Cyberpunk 2077	Judy Alvarez	Polish voiceover
