= Mistrz =

Mistrz is Polish for "Master" and can refer to:

- The Master (2005 film)
- The Champion (2020 film)
