= Henryk Gołębiewski (actor) =

Polish actor (born 1956)

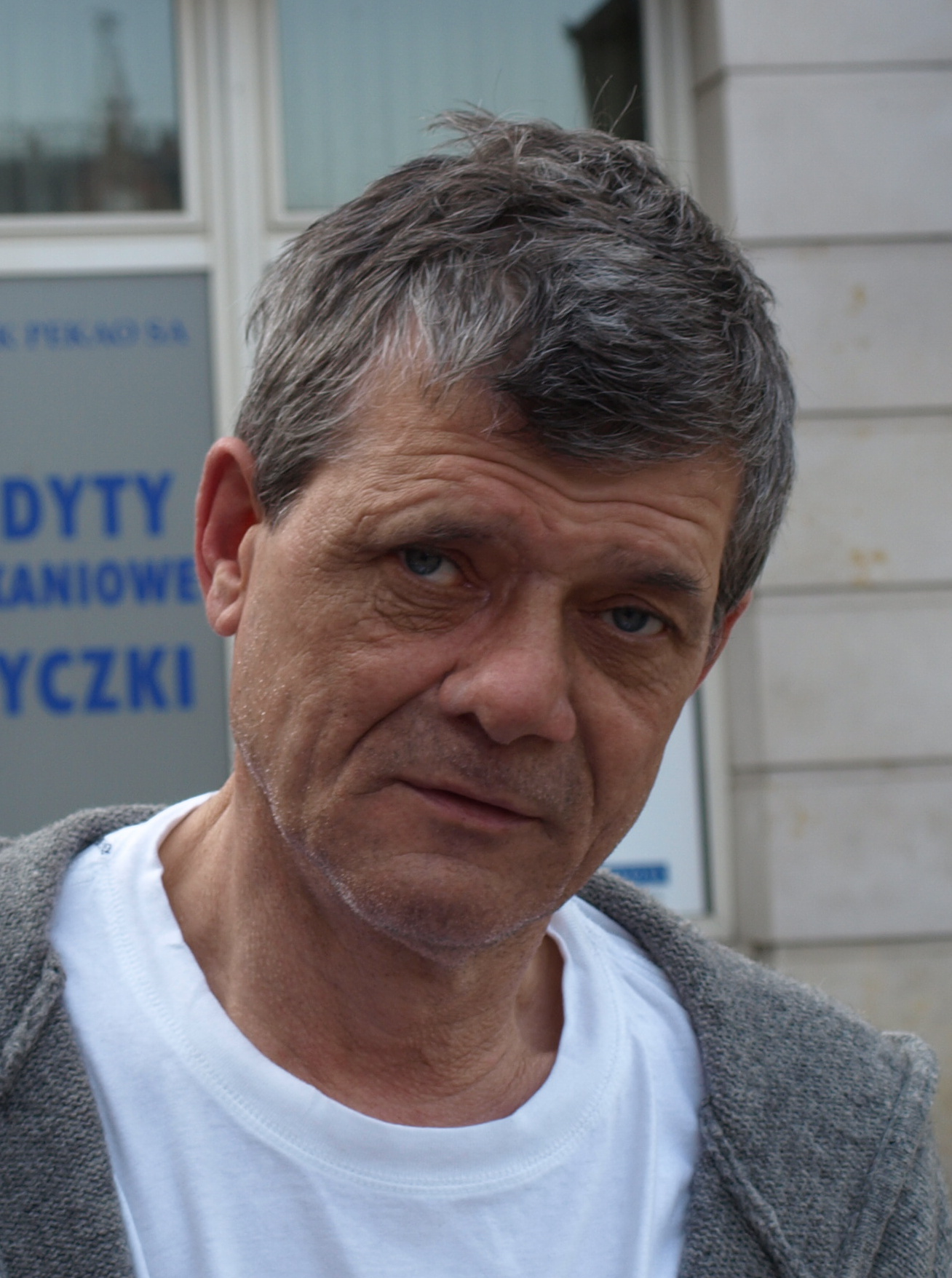
- Gołębiewski in 2011
- Born: Henryk Julian Gołębiewski; 15 June 1956 (age 69); Warsaw, Poland
- Other names: Henryk Golebiewski
- Occupation: Actor
- Years active: 1970–present
- Spouse: Marzenna Matusik (m. 2006)
- Children: 1 daughter

Henryk Julian Gołębiewski (born 15 June 1956) is a Polish actor. He is best known for his role in the film Edi (2002), for which he received a Polish Academy Award for Best Actor nomination.
