= My Father's Bike =

- Film poster
- Polish: Mój rower
- Directed by: Piotr Trzaskalski
- Written by: Piotr Trzaskalski; Wojciech Lepianka
- Starring: Michał Urbaniak; Artur Żmijewski
- Edited by: Cezary Kowalczuk
- Music by: Przemysław Stangierski, Wojciech Lemazski
- Release date: 9 May 2012 (GFF)
- Running time: 90 minutes
- Country: Poland
- Language: Polish

My Father's Bike (Polish: Mój rower) is a 2012 Polish comedy film directed by Piotr Trzaskalski. The film premiered at the Gdynia Film Festival, where Trzaskalski and Wojciech Lepianka won best screenplay.

== Cast ==
- Michał Urbaniak as Wlodzimierz Starnawski
- Artur Żmijewski as Pawel Starnawski
- Krzysztof Chodorowski as Maciek Starnawski
- Witold Dębicki as Franek Wera
- Anna Nehrebecka as Barbara Starnawska
- Piotr Szczepanik as Mirek

== Reception and awards ==
Neil Young of The Hollywood Reporter wrote that a "music-themed Polish comedy-drama of inter-generational family matters may strike a chord with domestic audiences".

The film was awarded the Golden Teeth Award at the 2005 Polish Film Festival in America.
