= Bilguun Ariunbaatar =

Polish actor, television presenter, and singer

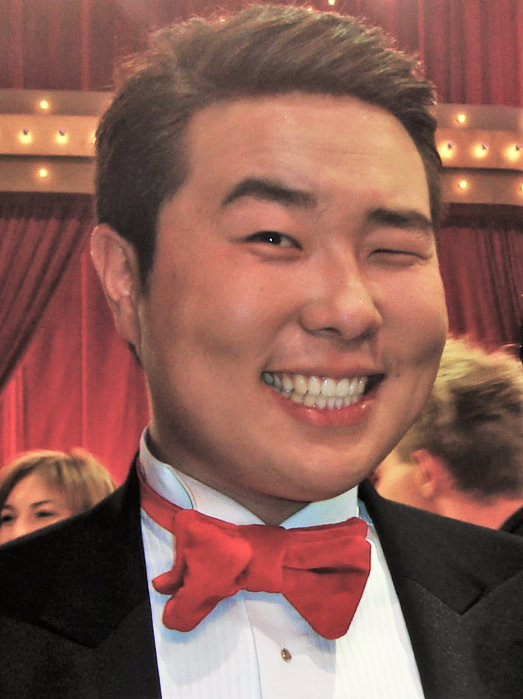
- Bilguun Ariunbaatar in 2011.
- Born: 31 January 1987 (age 39); Ulaanbaatar, Mongolia
- Occupations: Actor, television presenter, singer
- Years active: 2010–present
- Spouse: Kamila Rolak (m. 2025)
- Musical career
- Genre: Rock
- Formerly of: Lavina (2015–2023)

Bilguun Ariunbaatar (Note: Polish pronunciation: [bilˈɡun a.rjun.baˈtar]; Mongolian: Ариунбаатарын Билгүүн, [æryŋpaːtʰər piɬkuŋ], transcription: Ariunbaataryn Bilgüün) (born 31 January 1987) is a Polish actor, television presenter, and singer. He is best known for acting in the TVN sketch comedy and talk shows Szymon Majewski Show from 2010 to 2011, and Szymon na żywo in 2012, hosted by Szymon Majewski, where he portrayed a Mongolian journalist who speaks in broken Polish and is confused by Polish customs. Ariunbaatar also appeared in the feature films Brzuszek (2014), Bangistan (2015), Szczęścia chodzą parami (2022), Baśka (2026), and Baśka 2 (2026), and on the television series Komisarz Alex (2018), and Pawned & Perilous (2024), and in feature films Brzuszek (2014). He also co-hosted the TVN talk show HDw3D Telewision (2012), and hosted Viva Polska reality shows Puk, puk, to my! (2013) and Spanie z gwiazdami (2013). He also was a lead vocalists in the rock band Lavina, which operated from 2015 to 2023.

== Early life and education ==
Ariunbaatar was born on 31 January 1987 in Ulaanbaatar, Mongolia. His parents were physicians, and in 1998, when he was nine years old, his family emigrated to Warsaw, Poland. He has two siblings; a brother born in 1990, and a sister born in 2009. In 2010, he received the Polish citizenship. He studied for two years at the Medical University of Warsaw before dropping out. He later graduated with a bachelor's degree from a private university in Warsaw.

== Career ==
From 2010 to 2013, Ariunbaatar acted in the TVN sketch comedy and talk shows Szymon Majewski Show from 2010 to 2011, and Szymon na żywo in 2012, hosted by Szymon Majewski. He portrayed a Mongolian journalist who speaks in broken Polish and is confused by Polish customs. In 2011, together with Majewski, Ariunbaatar also co-hosted the TVN comedy talk show HDw3D Telewision, where he had a segment in which he interviewed politicians.

In 2011 Ariunbaatar participated in the dance talent show Dancing with the Stars. Taniec z gwiazdami, where, being paried with Janja Lesar, he finished at the second place. Later, from 2014 to 2015, together with Agnieszka Hyży, Ariunbaatar also co-hosted the Polsat Café behind-the-scenes documentary series dedicated to the show's creation, titled Kulisy "Tańca z Gwiazdami". In 2013, he hosted the Viva Polska reality shows Puk, puk, to my! and Spanie z gwiazdami. Ariunbaatar participated in the Polsat talent show Twoja twarz brzmi znajomo in 2014, the Polsat reality competition Celebrity Splash! in 2015, the TVP1 game show Big Music Quiz, and the Polsat reality competition cooking show Hell's Kitchen. Piekielna kuchnia in 2015. (Note: Attributed to multiple references:) Between 2013 and 2018, Ariunbaatar also performed as a guest singer in several episodes of the TVP1 game show Jaka to melodia?.

Ariunbaatar voiced Fawn, a secondary character in the Polish-language dubbed version of the 2011 animated musical fantasy romantic comedy film Gnomeo & Juliet. He also had secondary roles in the 2014 romantic comedy film Brzuszek and in the 2015 black comedy satirical film Bangistan.

In 2012 also Ariunbaatar worked for Rock Radio, and hosted the radio show Szybki Bill (lit. 'The Fast Bill') on Radio Zet. Since 2024, he is a part of the crew of the radio show Dzień dobry bardzo on Radio Zet, in which he hosts a segment where he questions people on the city streets.

Ariunbaatar acted in the play Udając ofiarę, directed by Krystyna Janda, and performed at the theatre Och-Teatr in Warsaw from 2015 to 2016. He again perfumed on state in the play (Nie) wszystko Ci oddam, directed by Dariusz Taraszkiewicz at the Skene Theatre in Warsaw.

In 2015, he joined the rock band Lavina, formed by Mateusz Banasiuk, Paweł Paszczyk, and Rafał Żukowski, becoming its lead vocalist and primary lyristist. Its debut album was released on 4 September 2020, and the band was disbanded in October 2023.

Ariunbaatar was named in a leaked list of the clients of a prominent cocaine dealer in 2018. He was subsequently blacklisted by the major television studios in Poland. At the time, he was also struggling with the clinical depression. Ariunbaatar decided to end his career and retreat from public life.

He returned to acting in 2020, appearing in an episode of the comedy drama webseries #Kwarantanna, and later in the 2022 romantic comedy film Szczęścia chodzą parami.

In 2024, Ariunbaatar also appeared on the television series Komisarz Alex and Pawned & Perilous. He portrayed Jargal, a secondary character in the comedy drama films Baśka and Baśka 2, both released in 2026. Ariunbaatar was also a participant in the Viaplay game show Fort Boyard Polska in 2024, and the Amazon Prime Video reality competition The 50 in 2025.

== Personal life ==
He has daughter Antonina, born in 2016, from an unmarried relationship. In 2025, he became engaged with dancer and actress Kamila Rolak, with whom he has a daughter Ofelia, born in 2024. For years, he struggled with the clinical depression.

== Filmography ==
=== Film ===
Year	Title	Role	Notes	Ref.
2014	Brzuszek	Dentist	Feature film	
2015	Bangistan	Wong	Feature film	
2022	Szczęścia chodzą parami	Taxi driver	Feature film	
2022	The Last Day of Work	Hero	Short film; also screenwriter	
2026	Baśka	Jargal	Feature film	
2026	Baśka 2	Jargal	Feature film	

=== Television ===
Year	Title	Role	Notes	Ref.
2010–2011	Szymon Majewski Show	Mongolian journalist	Comedy show	
2011	Dancing with the Stars. Taniec z gwiazdami	Himself (contestant)	Talent show	
2011	HDw3D Telewision	Himself (co-host)	Talk show; 12 episodes	
2012	Szymon na żywo	Mongolian journalist	Comedy show	
2013	Spanie z gwiazdami	Himself (host)	Reality show	
2013	Puk, puk, to my!	Himself (host)	Reality show	
2013–2018	Jaka to melodia?	Himself (guest singer)	Game show	
2014	Twoja twarz brzmi znajomo	Himself (contestant)	Talent show	
2014–2015	Kulisy "Tańca z gwiazdami"	Himself (co-host)	Documentary series	
2015	Celebrity Splash!	Himself (contestant)	Reality show	
2015	Hell's Kitchen. Piekielna kuchnia	Himself (contestant)	Reality show	
2018	Big Music Quiz	Himself (contestant)	Game show	
2018	Polacy z wyboru	Himself (guest)	Talk show	
2020	#Kwarantanna	Pizza delivery person	Webseries; episode no. 2	
2021	Fort Boyard Polska	Himself (contestant)	Game show	
2021	Kuba Wojewódzki	Himself (guest)	Talk show; 1 episode	
2024	Komisarz Alex	Ant Van	Episode: "Kret"	
2024	Pawned & Perilous	Himself	Episode no. 730	
2025	The 50	Himself (contestant)	Reality show	

=== Polish-language dubbing ===
Year	Title	Role	Notes	Ref.
2011	Gnomeo & Juliet	Fawn	Feature film	

== Theatre credits ==
Year	Title	Role	Venue	Director	Ref.
2015	Udając ofiarę	Zakirow	Och-Teatr (Warsaw, Poland)	Krystyna Janda	
2023	(Nie) wszystko Ci oddam	Tadeusz	Skene Theatre (Warsaw, Poland)	Dariusz Taraszkiewicz	

== Accolades and nominations ==
Awards and nominations received by Patrick Keleher
Award	Year	Category	Nominated work	Result	Ref.
Wiktor Awards	2012	Television Discovery of the Year	—N/a	Nominated	
