= Edi (film) =

- Directed by: Piotr Trzaskalski
- Written by: Piotr Trzaskalski; Wojciech Lepianka
- Produced by: Piotr Dzięcioł
- Starring: Henryk Gołębiewski; Jacek Braciak; Jacek Lenartowicz; Aleksandra Kisio; Dominik Bąk; Grzegorz Stelmaszewski
- Cinematography: Krzysztof Ptak
- Edited by: Cezary Kowalczuk
- Music by: Wojciech Lemański
- Production company: Opus Film
- Distributed by: Opus Film; SPI International
- Release date: 18 October 2002
- Running time: 97 minutes
- Country: Poland
- Language: Polish
- Box office: $1,310,652

Edi is a 2002 Polish drama film directed and co-written by Piotr Trzaskalski. It received critical acclaim and eleven Polish Film Award nominations, winning two for Best Supporting Actor and Audience Award.

The film was selected as the Polish entry for Best Foreign Language Film at the 75th Academy Awards, but it was not nominated.

== Plot ==
The film concerns two "scrap pickers" one of whom is falsely accused of seducing a woman and then forced to take care of her child.

== Cast ==
- Henryk Gołębiewski – Edi
- Jacek Braciak – Jureczek
- Jacek Lenartowicz – Brat I
- Grzegorz Stelmaszewski – Brat II
- Aleksandra Kisio – Księżniczka
- Dominik Bąk – Cygan
- Małgorzata Flegel-Siedler – Krysia
- Maria Maj – żona Małego
- Tomasz Jarosz – Andrzej
- Stefan Rola – Stefan
- Grażyna Suchocka – sklepowa

== Awards and nominations ==
It was submitted for the List of submissions to the 75th Academy Awards for Best Foreign Language Film, but did not make the cut. However it did win the Polish Academy Audience Award.
