= Jagna Marczułajtis-Walczak =

Polish snowboarder and politician

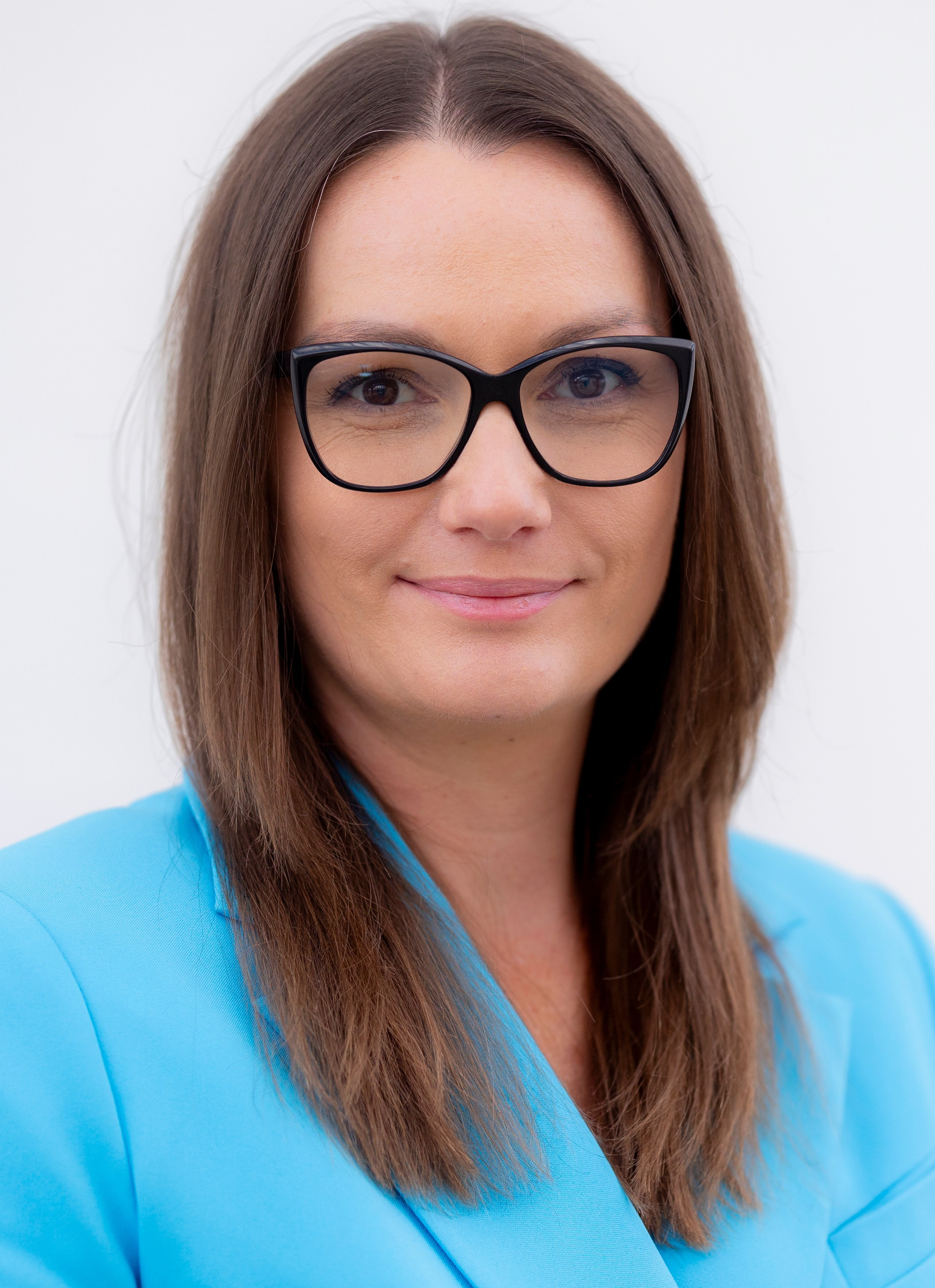
Jagna Marczułajtis-Walczak (2024)

Jagna Kinga Marczułajtis-Walczak (born 15 December 1978 in Zakopane) is a Polish politician and former snowboarder who competed in parallel slalom and parallel giant slalom. Since November 2011, she has been a member of the Polish Sejm. Elected as a Member of the European Parliament in 2024.

Marczułajtis' best finishes in the World Cup in parallel slalom are two 1st places: in January 2006 in Nendaz and in January 2004 in Bad Gastein. She competed for Poland in three Olympic Games: Nagano 1998, Salt Lake City 2002 (where she placed 4th), and Turin 2006.

She is also a 14-time Champion of Poland (including currently, in 2006), a one-time European Champion and a one-time European Championships Runner-up. She has won a medal at the World Championships. She is also a two-time World Junior Champion.

Marczułajtis is the former wife of fellow Polish Olympian, ice dancer Sebastian Kolasiński. She was born and lives in Zakopane, Poland with her two daughters, Jagoda Olimpia (born in 2002), and Iga (born in 2008).

She chaired the committee organising the Kraków bid for the 2022 Winter Olympics, but resigned from this position in April 2014.
