= Nizhnyaya Mayka =

Nizhnyaya Mayka Нижняя Майка
- Village
- Location within Bashkortostan Location within Russia
- Coordinates: 52°39′N 56°37′E
- Country: Russia
- Region: Bashkortostan
- District: Kugarchinsky District
- Time zone: UTC+5:00

Nizhnyaya Mayka (Russian: Нижняя Майка; Bashkir: Түбәнге Майҡы, Tübänge Mayqı) is a rural locality (a village) in Mrakovsky Selsoviet, Kugarchinsky District, Bashkortostan, Russia. The population was 2 as of 2010. There is 1 street.

== Geography ==
Nizhnyaya Mayka is located 8 km south of Mrakovo (the district's administrative centre) by road. Mrakovo is the nearest rural locality.
