= Aleksandra Kisio =

Polish actress (born 1983)

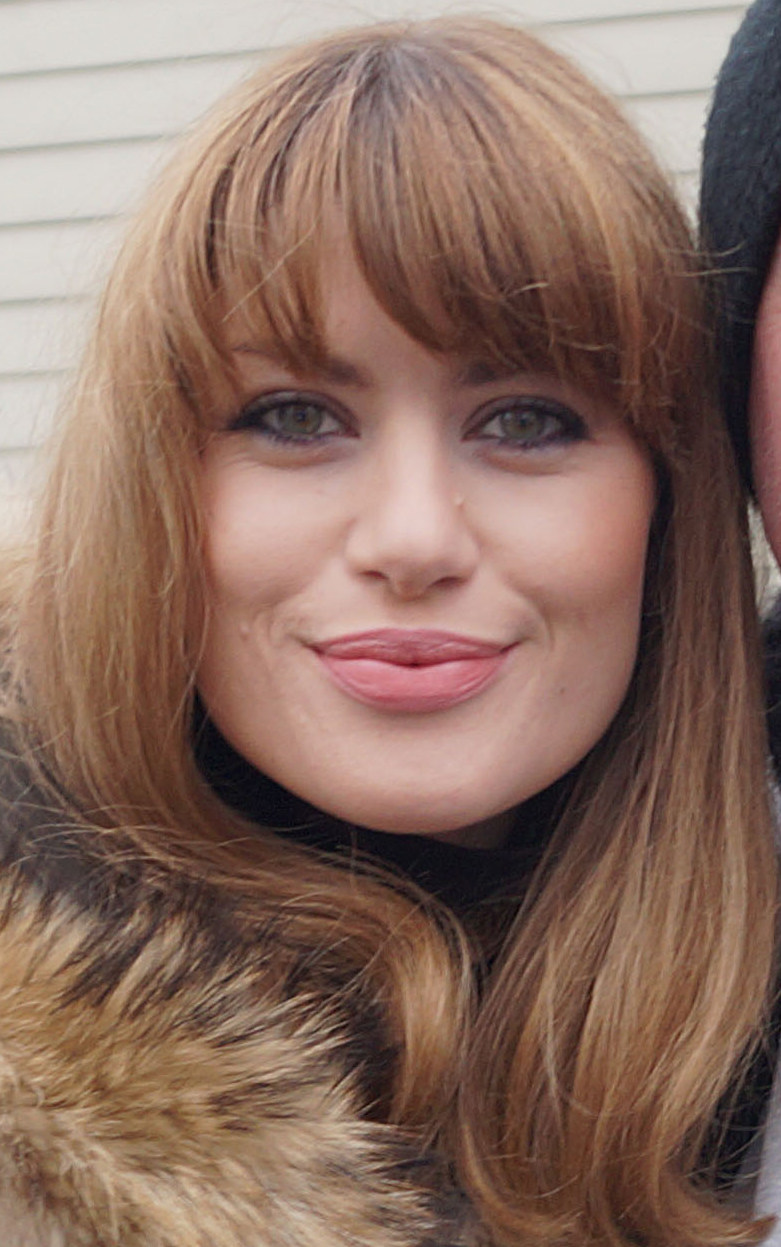
- Aleksandra Kisio (2017)
- Born: 22 March 1983 (age 43); Stargard Szczeciński, Poland
- Occupation: actress
- Years active: since 2002
- Mother: Izabela Kisio-Skorupa

Aleksandra Kisio (born 22 March 1983) is a Polish actress.

== Filmography ==
- 1999: Chłopaki nie płaczą – guest's in bar partner
- 2002: Edi
- 2002: Kariera Nikosia Dyzmy
- 2002: Jak to się robi z dziewczynami
- 2005: Szaleńcy
- 2005: The Call of the Toad
- 2006: Dublerzy
- 2006: Rzeźnia numer 1
- 2006-2007: Kopciuszek
- 2007: Testosteron
- 2009: Brzydula
- 2014: Galeria
- 2011: Prosto w serce
- 2013: Pierwsza miłość
