= Katarzyna Pakosińska =

Polish actress and comedian

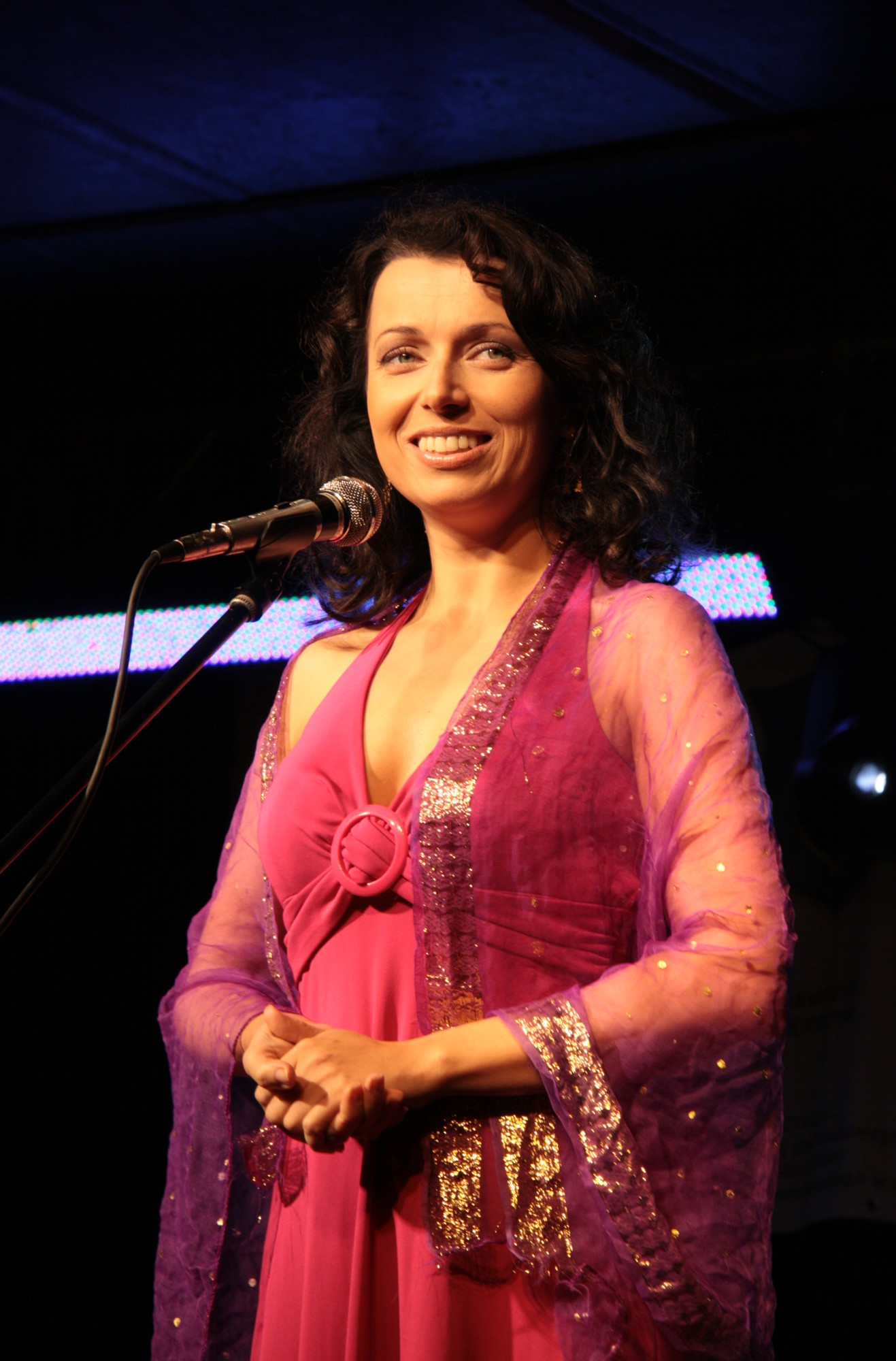
- Katarzyna Pakosińska
- Born: April 9, 1972 (age 54); Warsaw, Poland
- Occupations: Actress, comic
- Years active: 1996–present

Katarzyna Pakosińska (born April 9, 1972) is a Polish actress, comedian and former member of Polish cabaret group Kabaret Moralnego Niepokoju.

== Biography ==
Pakosińska was born in Warsaw on April 9, 1972. In 1991 she graduated from Arts High School and began Polish studies at the University of Warsaw.

Since 1996 to 2011, she was a member of cabaret group Kabaret Moralnego Niepokoju.

With her ex-husband, Tomasz, Pakosińska has a daughter, Maja. They live in Milanówek.

== Filmography ==
- 1995 - Deborah as Hana Hofstein
- 1997 - Łóżko Wierszynina as Ewa
- 1997 - Boża podszewka as Jewish woman
- 1999 - Dr Jekyll i Mr Hyde według Wytwórni A'YoY as Ann
- 1999 - Badziewiakowie as journalist
- 2007 - Niania as psychologist
- 2011 - Hotel 52
- 2011 - Linia życia
