= Mayka Mecheba =

Equatoguinean footballer and painter

Mayka
Personal information
- Full name: Milagrosa Mecheba Ebaco
- Date of birth: 12 February 1987 (age 39)
- Place of birth: Bata, Equatorial Guinea
- Height: 1.62 m (5 ft 4 in)
- Positions: Midfielder; winger

Team information
- Current team: Inter Promesas
- Number: 6

Senior career*
Years	Team	Apps	(Gls)
2011	Torrelodones CF		
2011–2012	Madrid CFF		
2012–2013	CDAV San Nicasio		
2014–2018	CD Amistades Guadalajara	96	(40)
2018–2019	EMF Fuensalida	23+	(14+)
2019–2020	Dinamo Guadalajara	1	(0)
2020–2021	AD Fundación	12	(13)
2023–	Inter Promesas	2	(0)

International career^{‡}
2017–	Equatorial Guinea	1	(0)
- * Club domestic league appearances and goals as of 19 February 2023 ‡ National team caps and goals as of 26 November 2017

Milagrosa Mecheba Ebaco (born 12 February 1987), commonly known as Mayka, is an Equatorial Guinean painter and footballer who plays as a midfielder for Primera Madrid club CD Inter Promesas and the Equatorial Guinea women's national team. She also holds Spanish citizenship.

== Club career ==
Mayka started with Torrelodones CF in Segunda División. She suffered a serious injury during the final stretch of the 2010-2011 campaign. She moved to Madrid CFF for the next season.

She joined Segunda División club CDAV San Nicasio in the summer of 2012. She remained there until the middle of the 2013-2014 campaign. Then, she moved to CD Amistades Guadalajara, playing her first match for them on 1 March 2014. Over the years, she became the team captain.

In early 2018, she left her long-time team Amistades Guadalajara to join Segunda División side EMF Fuensalida.

== International career ==
Mayka made her international debut for Equatorial Guinea on 26 November 2017, coming on as a second-half substitute in a 4–0 home friendly win against Comoros.
