= Weronika Marczuk =

Polish actress

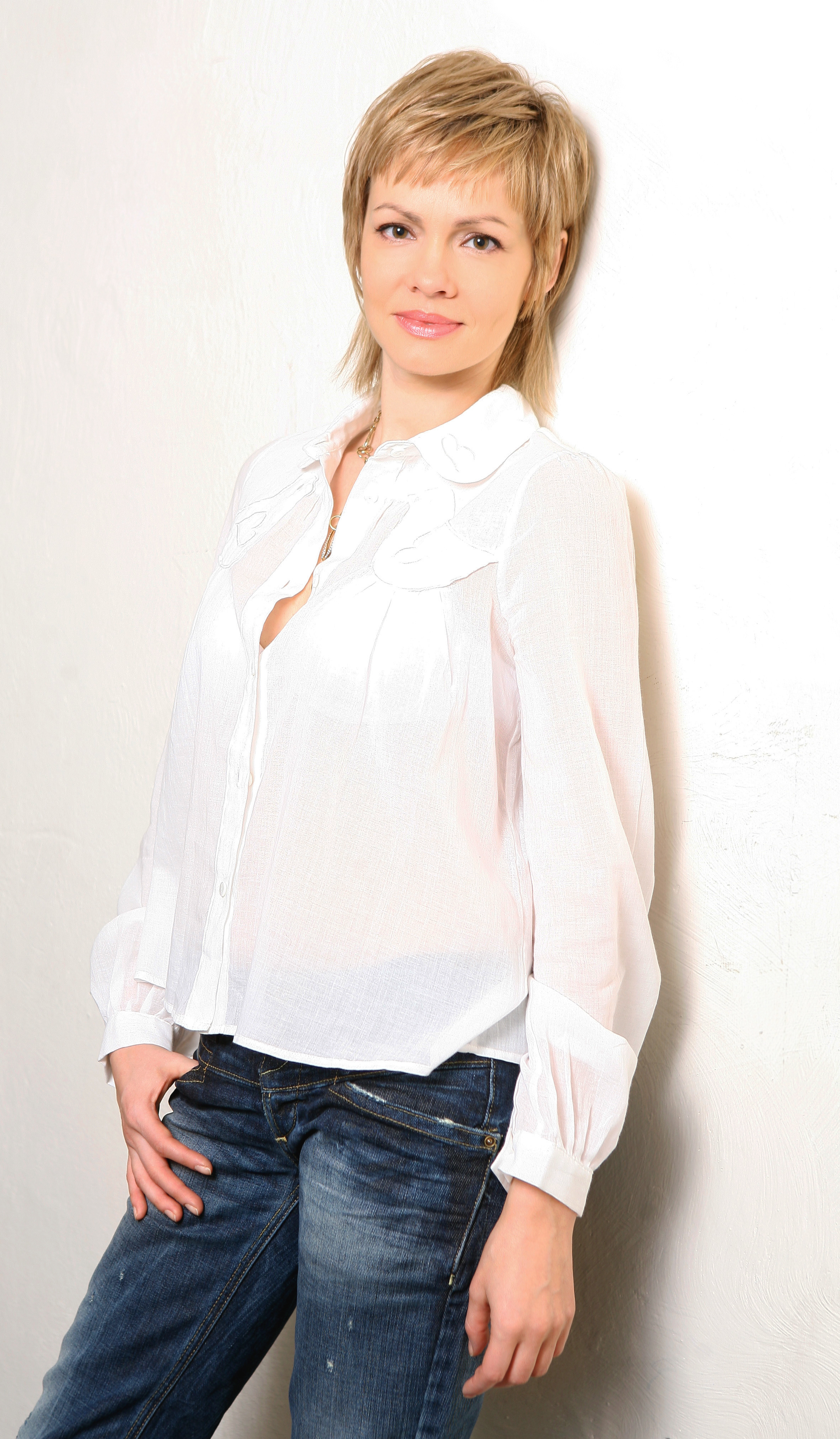
- Born: Olena Marchuk; 28 November 1971 (age 54); Kyiv, Ukrainian SSR, Soviet Union
- Occupations: Film producer, television personality, actress
- Spouse(s): Bartosz Nowopolski (1993–1995); Cezary Pazura (1995–2007)
- Children: 3 (Note: 2 deceased)

Weronika Olena Marczuk (Ukrainian: Олена Марчук; born 28 November 1971) is a Ukrainian-born Polish film producer, lawyer, actress, author, social activist, and television personality.

== Early life and education ==
Marczuk was born and raised in Kyiv, the daughter of Michał and Nina Marczuk. Her father worked as a driver, and her mother was the head of the passport office. She had a sister, Inna, three years younger than her, who died less than a year after birth. In her youth, she graduated from music school and attended pantomime and dance classes. From 1989 to 1991, she worked as an organizer of extracurricular activities at school No. 224 of Kyiv and studied chemistry and biology at the Pedagogical University. At the age of 20, she came to Poland to work, not knowing Polish. For a year she worked as a show dancer in the Marina, Gdynia, Posejdon and Heweliusz hotels and studied foreign trade at the economic school in Sopot. She graduated in law and administration from the University of Warsaw and completed legal counsel training. In the years 2006–2008 she obtained an MBA diploma at the Business Center Club. She ran the Anvero law firm, specializing in copyright and press law.

== Career ==
Marczuk is the co-owner of the production company Sting Communication and a member of the Polish Film Academy. She was one of the originators and managing director of the SAFT Film and Television Actors Association (2002–2008). From its founding until 2007, she was vice-president of the Art. Sport Foundation, which supervises the football representation of Polish Artists. By October 2006, Marczuk became been the president of the Society of Friends of Ukraine TPU in Poland. From 2007 to 2009, she sat on the jury of the first four editions of the TVN program You Can Dance – Po prostu tańcz!. From 2008 to 2009, she co-hosted the TVN Style talk show Miasto kobiet. By decision of the supervisory board of WSEInfoEngine SA, a subsidiary of the Warsaw Stock Exchange, on 1 July 2009, she was appointed president of the management board of WSEInfoEngine S.A. On 25 September 2009, she was dismissed from her position due to her arrest by the Central Anticorruption Bureau. She described the details of the arrest in a book entitled Chcę być jak agent (2010).

In June 2011, the first edition of the international festival "Neighbors at the Table" took place in Iława, of which Marczuk was the originator and artistic director. In 2011, together with Jan Kliment, she took third place in the 13th edition of the TVN entertainment program Dancing with the Stars. Taniec z gwiazdami. In March 2012, she won together with Rafał Maserak in the final of the Star Dance Tournament "Elixa 2012". On 29 April, at the National Stadium in Warsaw, the Great All-Star Match between the two nations Poland and Ukraine took place, which was co-organized with the Society of Friends of Ukraine. The income from the tickets was intended to help children's home No. 1 in Warsaw and the MALIATKO children's home in Ukraine.

In 2013, Marczuk produced a modern dance performance entitled "I Move You" directed by Maciej Zakliczyński; the play premiered at the Dramatyczny Theater in Białystok and was played in Poland, among others, at the Buffo Theater. Also in 2013, she founded the organization "White Ribbon Ukraine" and conducted the first large social campaign in Ukraine against violence against women entitled You like it, don't be! In 2014, she unsuccessfully ran for a seat in the Łódź district in the European Parliament elections, starting from the first place on the list of the Democratic Left Alliance - Labor Union electoral committee and obtaining 14,572 votes.

From 2015 to 2016, Marczuk was the organizer of a series of exhibitions "Genotype of Freedom" by Ivan Marczuk, listed by the Daily Telegraph among the hundred living geniuses of the world. The first exhibition took place at the Kordegarda Gallery in Warsaw with the participation of the Ministers of Culture of both countries, the next ones were organized at the NCK Gallery in Krakow and the Museum in Żyrardów.

In 2016, she was invited to Kyiv, together with a team of Polish managers, to manage the state-owned Ukrainian Railways, where she worked as the Management Board Director for two years. Also in 2016, she became the president and co-founder of a women's non-governmental organization in Kyiv "International Women's Entrepreneurship Embassy". In 2018, she started working at the Polish-Ukrainian Chamber of Commerce as the managing director of the subsidiary Polish Business Center in Kyiv. Since 2019, she has been the PUIG representative for the Ukrainian market and a member of the Chamber Council.

In 2020, Marczuk wrote a second book titled Walka o macierzyństwo.

== Personal life ==
From 1993 to 1995, Marczuk first husband was Bartosz Nowopolski. In 1995, she married actor Cezary Pazura in a civil ceremony, whom she met in Sopot in 1994. Their church wedding took place in 2003. In 2007, they divorced. At the end of 2009, at the request of Pazura, she reverted to her maiden name.

Marczuk has been in long-term relationship with anonymous man since 2012, and in January 2020, she gave birth to their daughter, Anna. Before having her daughter, Marczuk had suffered loss of twin children, a boy and a girl, who were born prematurely, as well as multiple miscarriages.
