= Och-Teatr =

Theater in Warsaw, Poland

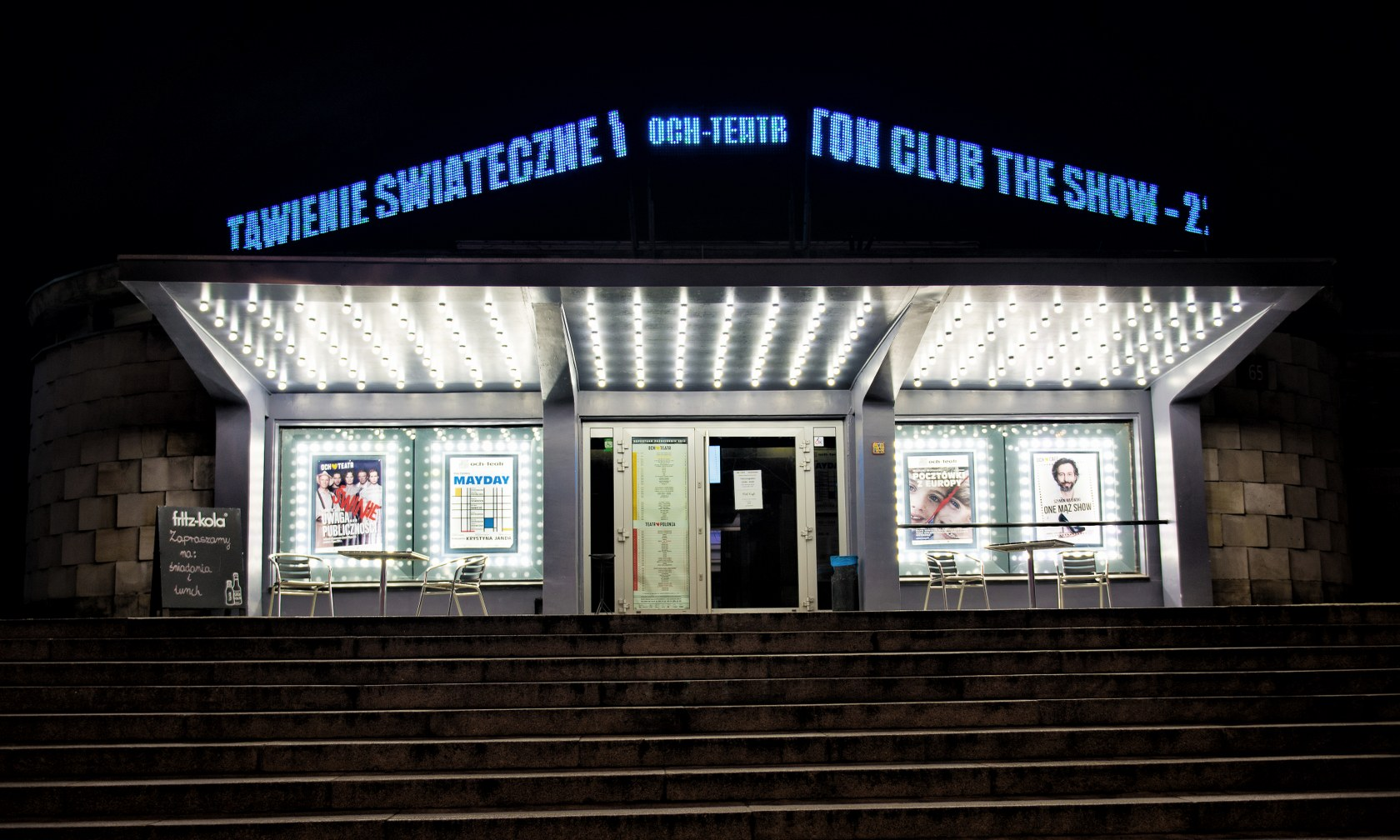
- Interactive map of Och-Teatr
- Address: ul. Grójecka 65; Warsaw; Poland
- Coordinates: 52.214199°N 20.980147°E
- Capacity: 454 (main stage), 100 (Och-Cafe Theater)

Construction
- Opened: 2010

Website
- https://ochteatr.com.pl/

Och-Teatr is a privately owned performing arts theater located in Ochota, Warsaw. It was founded in 2010 by Krystyna Janda's Foundation for Culture. It has a total of 554 seats, 100 of which are unnumbered in the smaller Och-Cafe Theater section.

== History ==
The theater is located in the building of a former cinema called Ochota, established in 1949.

On January 16, 2010, Och-Theater opened with a 447-seat auditorium and a premiere of Maxim Gorky's Vassa Zheleznova. The theater began to play regularly, taking over some of the repertoire from the Polonia Theater and creating its own, while also moving toward the music scene.

It has hosted concerts by Maria Peszek, Ania Dąbrowska and Kult, among others. On September 21, 2013, the premiere of the play Pierwsza Dama (English: The First Lady), directed by Grzegorz Warchoł, inaugurated the new Och-Cafe Theater stage, located in the theater's café and halls, with plans to play repertoire different from the other stages touching on current social issues. Every summer, Och-Theater invites the public to free outdoor performances.

== Staff ==
• Foundation President: Krystyna Janda

• Director of Och-Theater: Alicja Przerazińska
