= Prosto w serce =

- Genre: soap opera
- Directed by: Jarosław Banaszek; Filip Zylber; Kinga Lewińska; Anna Jadowska
- Starring: Anna Mucha; Filip Bobek; Małgorzata Socha
- Composer: Łukasz Targosz
- Country of origin: Poland
- Original language: Polish

Production
- Executive producer: Robert Wieczorek
- Running time: 25 minutes

Original release
- Network: TVN
- Release: 3 January 2011 – 2012

Related
- Majka; Sos mi vida

Prosto w serce (English: Straight Into the Heart) is the Polish version of the popular Argentinean soap opera Sos mi vida. It is broadcast on weekdays at 17:55 on TVN since Monday, January 3, 2011. The pilot episode was broadcast on Thursday, December 23, 2010 at 18:25 after the final episode of Majka.

== Cast ==
Actor	Role
Anna Mucha	Monika Milewska
Filip Bobek	Artur Sagowski
Małgorzata Socha	Konstancja Grylak
Grzegorz Małecki	Cezary Wójcik
Ewa Kasprzyk	Nina Wójcik
Aleksandra Kisio	Gośka Figura
Marta Powałowska	Basia Stasiak
Jacek Braciak	Rafał Sagowski
Agnieszka Sienkiewicz	Wiki Sagowska
Agata Kulesza	Aneta Sienkiewicz
Krzysztof Stelmaszyk	Feliks Warecki
Maria Winiarska	Krystyna Kobierzyńska
Marianna Januszewicz	Laura Dobroś
Wojciech Rotowski	Jakub Dobroś
Amelia Gontarczuk	Hania Dobroś
