= Michał Lewandowski =

Polish footballer

Personal information
- Date of birth: 2 August 1996 (age 30)
- Place of birth: Mielec, Poland
- Height: 1.91 m (6 ft 3 in)
- Position: Goalkeeper

Team information
- Current team: Sokół Kolbuszowa Dolna
- Number: 1

Youth career
- –2014: Stal Mielec
- 2014–2016: Crotone

Senior career*
Years	Team	Apps	(Gls)
2016–2017	Avezzano	33	(0)
2017–2021	Teramo	62	(0)
2018	→ Monopoli (loan)	0	(0)
2021–2023	Messina	46	(1)
2023–	Sokół Kolbuszowa Dolna	73	(0)

International career
2013	Poland U18	1	(0)
- * Club domestic league appearances and goals as of 17:04, 4 June 2026 (UTC)

Michał Lewandowski (born 2 August 1996) is a Polish professional footballer who plays as a goalkeeper for III liga club Sokół Kolbuszowa Dolna.

== Club career ==
Lewandowski started his football with polish club Stal Mielec before moving to Italy and signing with second division side Crotone. He played for the club in the youth Campionato Nazionale Primavera before leaving the start of the 2016–17 season due to needing to have surgery on his wrist.

In 2016, he started his senior career with Avezzano in the Italian fourth division where he would play in 33 matches, keeping 10 clean sheets. Lewandowski then went on to sign with Italian third division club Teramo who he played for, for four years making 69 appearances in the championship and the cup, keeping 24 clean sheets. His time at the club also included a brief spell at Monopoli.

On 3 August 2021, he signed a two-year contract for Messina.

On 6 November 2022, he scored the second goal in a 3–2 home Serie C league win against Monterosi by means of a free kick from his own half.

On 9 September 2023, after spending the summer training with Stal Mielec's reserve team, Lewandowski joined IV liga club Sokół Kolbuszowa Dolna.

== Honours ==
Sokół Kolbuszowa Dolna

- IV liga Subcarpathia: 2024–25
