= Ludens =

Ludens may refer to:

- Ludens, (singular: luden) a fictional race in the Noon Universe
- Ludens (skipper), a genus of skippers in the family Hesperiidae
- "Ludens", a song by Bring Me the Horizon from the Death Stranding soundtrack album and their EP Post Human: Survival Horror

== See also ==
- Luden, a surname
- Luden's, a brand of throat lozenge
- Homo Ludens ("Playing Man"), a 1938 book about the play element in culture
- Deus ludens, the concept of a playful God
