= Luden =

Luden is a surname. Notable people with the surname include:

- Heinrich Luden (1778-1847), German historian
- Jack Luden (1902-1951), American film actor
- William H. Luden (1859-1949), American businessman
  - Luden's, a brand of cough drop developed by William H. Luden
- Yitzhak Luden (1922–2017) Isrtaeli journalist, writer, and Bund activist

== See also ==
- Ludens (disambiguation)
