= Creation myth =

Symbolic narrative of how the world began

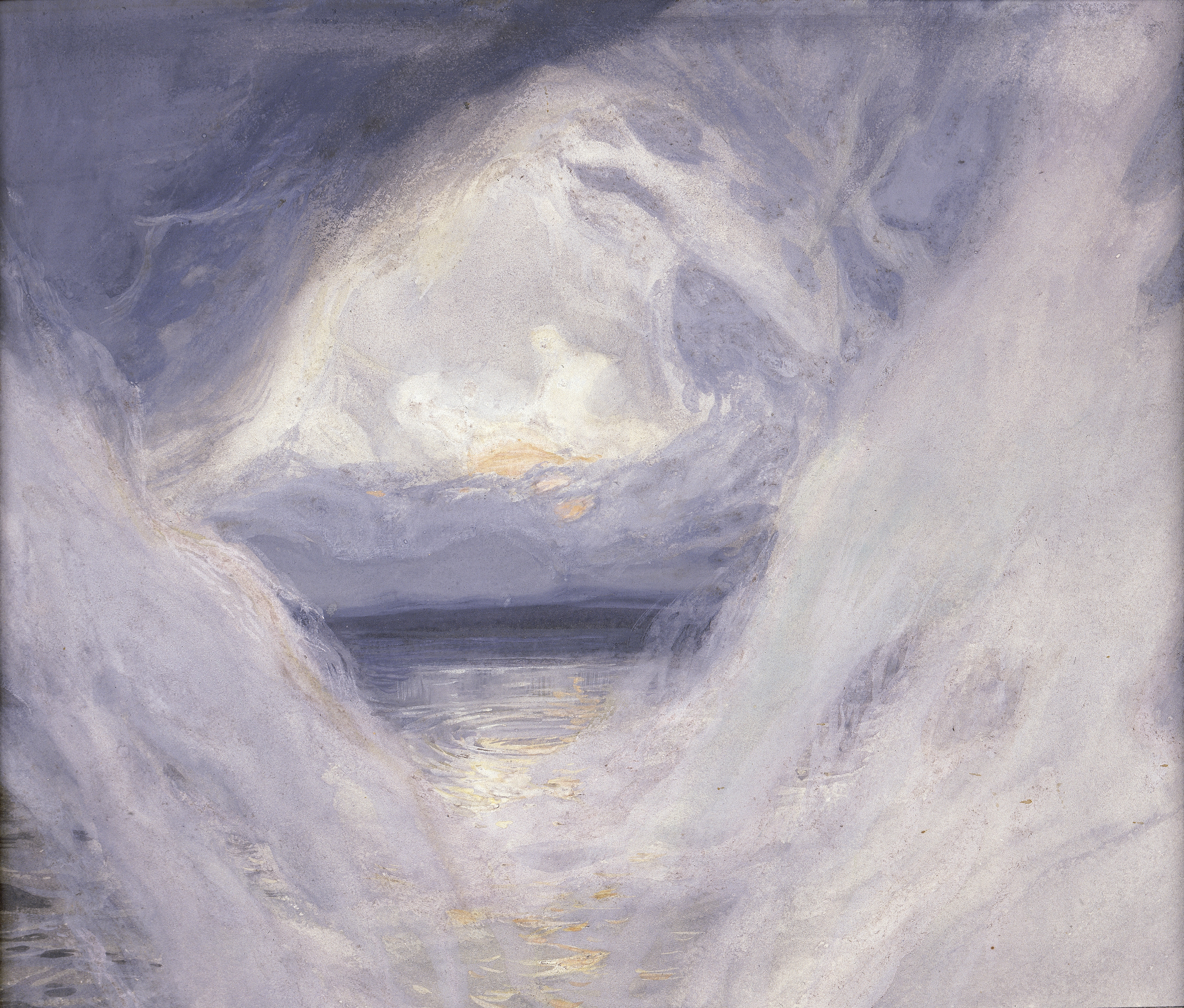
The Creation (c. 1896–1902), painting by James Tissot

A creation myth or cosmogonic myth is a type of cosmogony, a symbolic narrative of how the world began and how people first came to inhabit it. While in popular usage the term myth often refers to false or fanciful stories, members of cultures often ascribe varying degrees of truth to their creation myths. In the society in which it is told, a creation myth is usually regarded as conveying profound truths – metaphorically, symbolically, historically, or literally. They are commonly, although not always, considered cosmogonical myths – that is, they describe the ordering of the cosmos from a state of chaos or amorphousness.

Creation myths often share several features. They often are considered sacred accounts and can be found in nearly all known religious traditions. They are all stories with a plot and characters who are either deities, human-like figures, or animals, who often speak and transform easily. They are often set in a dim and nonspecific past that historian of religion Mircea Eliade termed in illo tempore ('at that time'). Creation myths address questions deeply meaningful to the society that shares them, revealing their central worldview and the framework for the self-identity of the culture and individual in a universal context.

Creation myths develop in oral traditions and therefore typically have multiple versions; found throughout human culture, they are the most common form of myth.

== Definitions ==
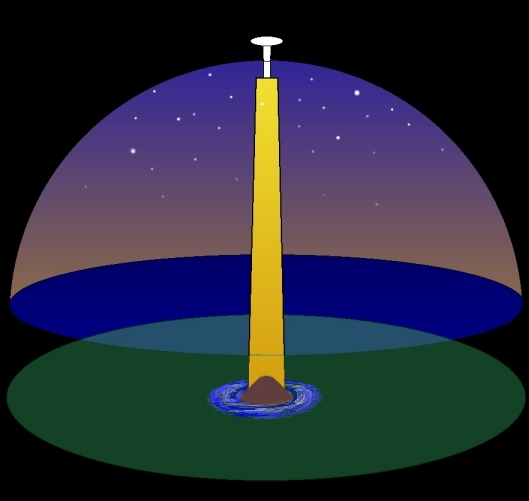
Structure of the world, according to Finnish mythology

Creation myth definitions from modern references:

- A "symbolic narrative of the beginning of the world as understood in a particular tradition and community. Creation myths are of central importance for the valuation of the world, for the orientation of humans in the universe, and for the basic patterns of life and culture."
- "Creation myths tell us how things began. All cultures have creation myths; they are our primary myths, the first stage in what might be called the psychic life of the species. As cultures, we identify ourselves through the collective dreams we call creation myths, or cosmogonies. ... Creation myths explain in metaphorical terms our sense of who we are in the context of the world, and in so doing they reveal our real priorities, as well as our real prejudices. Our images of creation say a great deal about who we are."
- A "philosophical and theological elaboration of the primal myth of creation within a religious community. The term myth here refers to the imaginative expression in narrative form of what is experienced or apprehended as basic reality ... The term creation refers to the beginning of things, whether by the will and act of a transcendent being, by emanation from some ultimate source, or in any other way."

Religion professor Mircea Eliade defined the word myth in terms of creation:

Myth narrates a sacred history; it relates an event that took place in primordial Time, the fabled time of the "beginnings." In other words, myth tells how, through the deeds of Supernatural Beings, a reality came into existence, be it the whole of reality, the Cosmos, or only a fragment of reality – an island, a species of plant, a particular kind of human behavior, an institution.

== Meaning and function ==
In Daoist creation myth, "The Way gave birth to unity; unity gave birth to duality; duality gave birth to trinity; trinity gave birth to the myriad creatures." (Daodejing, 4th century BCE)

Creation myths have been around since ancient history and have served important societal roles. Over 100 "distinct" ones have been discovered. All creation myths are in one sense etiological because they attempt to explain how the world formed and where humanity came from. Myths attempt to explain the unknown and sometimes teach a lesson.

Ethnologists and anthropologists who study origin myths say that in the modern context theologians try to discern humanity's meaning from revealed truths and scientists investigate cosmology with the tools of empiricism and rationality, but creation myths define human reality in very different terms. In the past, historians of religion and other students of myth thought of such stories as forms of primitive or early-stage science or religion and analyzed them in a literal or logical sense. Today, however, they are seen as symbolic narratives which must be understood in terms of their own cultural context. Charles Long, for example, writes: "The beings referred to in the myth – gods, animals, plants – are forms of power grasped existentially. The myths should not be understood as attempts to work out a rational explanation of deity."

While creation myths are not literal explications, they do serve to define an orientation of humanity in the world in terms of a birth story. They provide the basis of a worldview that reaffirms and guides how people relate to the natural world, to any assumed spiritual world, and to each other. A creation myth acts as a cornerstone for distinguishing primary reality from relative reality, the origin and nature of being from non-being. In this sense cosmogonic myths serve as a philosophy of life – but one expressed and conveyed through symbol rather than through systematic reason. And in this sense they go beyond etiological myths (which explain specific features in religious rites, natural phenomena, or cultural life). Creation myths also help to orient human beings in the world, giving them a sense of their place in the world and the regard that they must have for humans and nature.

Historian David Christian has summarized issues common to multiple creation myths:

How did everything begin? This is the first question faced by any creation myth and ... answering it remains tricky. ... Each beginning seems to presuppose an earlier beginning. ... Instead of meeting a single starting point, we encounter an infinity of them, each of which poses the same problem. ... There are no entirely satisfactory solutions to this dilemma. What we have to find is not a solution but some way of dealing with the mystery .... And we have to do so using words. The words we reach for, from God to gravity, are inadequate to the task. So we have to use language poetically or symbolically; and such language, whether used by a scientist, a poet, or a shaman, can easily be misunderstood.

== Classification ==
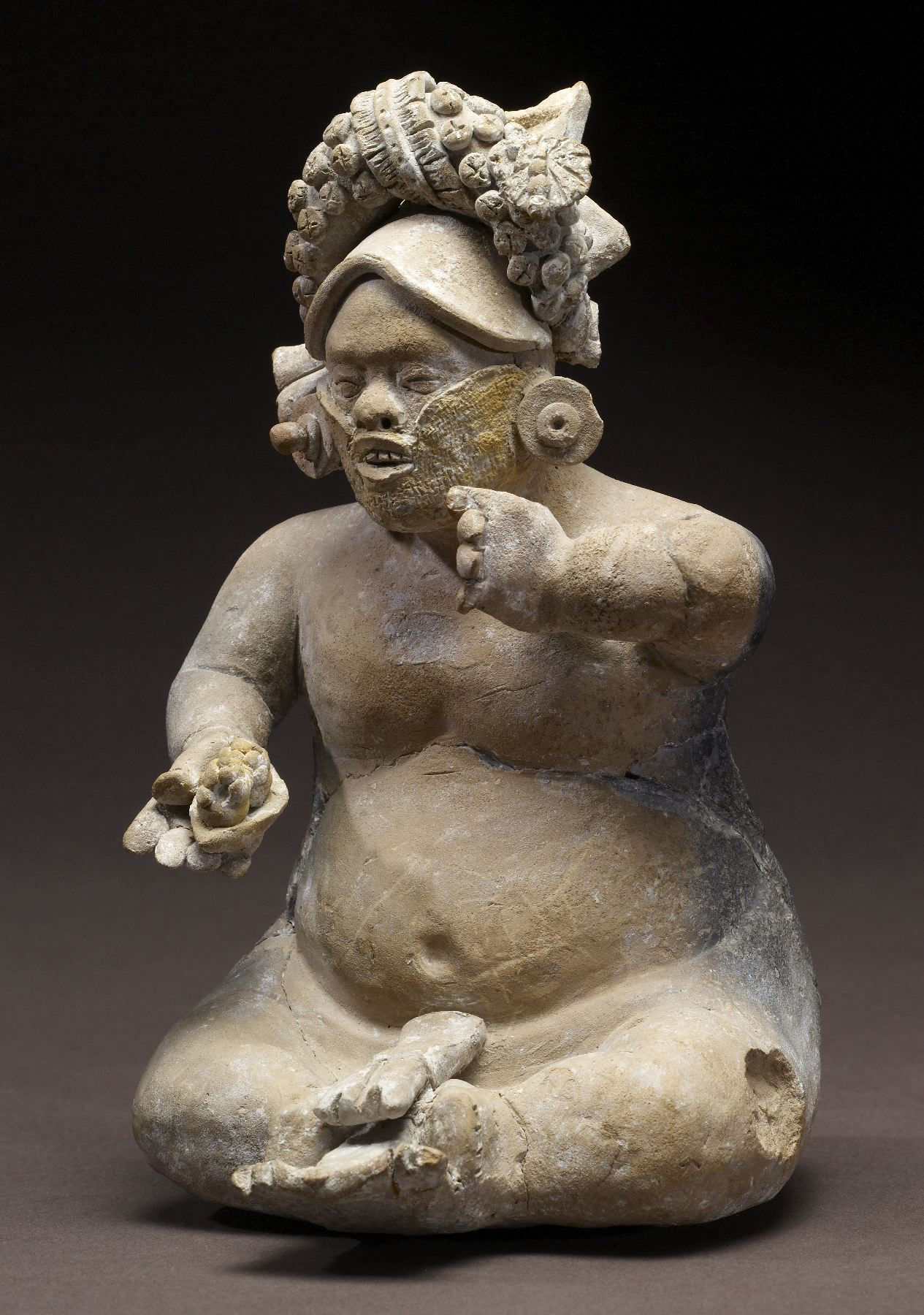
In Maya religion, the dwarf was an embodiment of the Maize God's helpers at creation.

Mythologists have applied various schemes to classify creation myths found throughout human cultures. Eliade and his colleague Charles Long developed a classification based on some common motifs that reappear in stories the world over. The classification identifies five basic types:

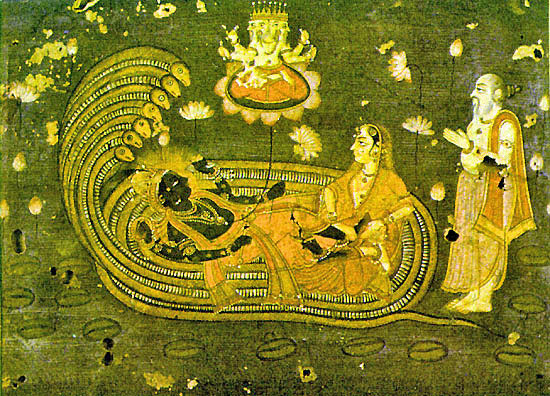
Brahmā, the Hindu deva of creation, emerges from a lotus risen from the navel of Viṣņu, who lies with Lakshmi on the serpent Ananta Shesha.

- Creation ex nihilo in which the creation is through the thought, word, dream, or bodily secretions of a divine being.
- Earth-diver creation in which a diver, usually a bird or amphibian sent by a creator, plunges to the seabed through a primordial ocean to bring up sand or mud which develops into a terrestrial world.
- Emergence myths in which progenitors pass through a series of worlds and metamorphoses until reaching the present world.
- Creation by the dismemberment of a primordial being.
- Creation by the splitting or ordering of a primordial unity such as the cracking of a cosmic egg or a bringing order from chaos.

Marta Weigle further developed and refined this typology to highlight nine themes, adding elements such as deus faber, a creation crafted by a deity, creation from the work of two creators working together or against each other, creation from sacrifice and creation from division/conjugation, accretion/conjunction, or secretion.

An alternative system based on six recurring narrative themes was designed by Raymond Van Over:

- Primeval abyss, an infinite expanse of waters or space
- Originator deity which is awakened or an eternal entity within the abyss
- Originator deity poised above the abyss
- Cosmic egg or embryo
- Originator deity creating life through sound or word
- Life generating from the corpse or dismembered parts of an originator deity

=== Ex nihilo ===
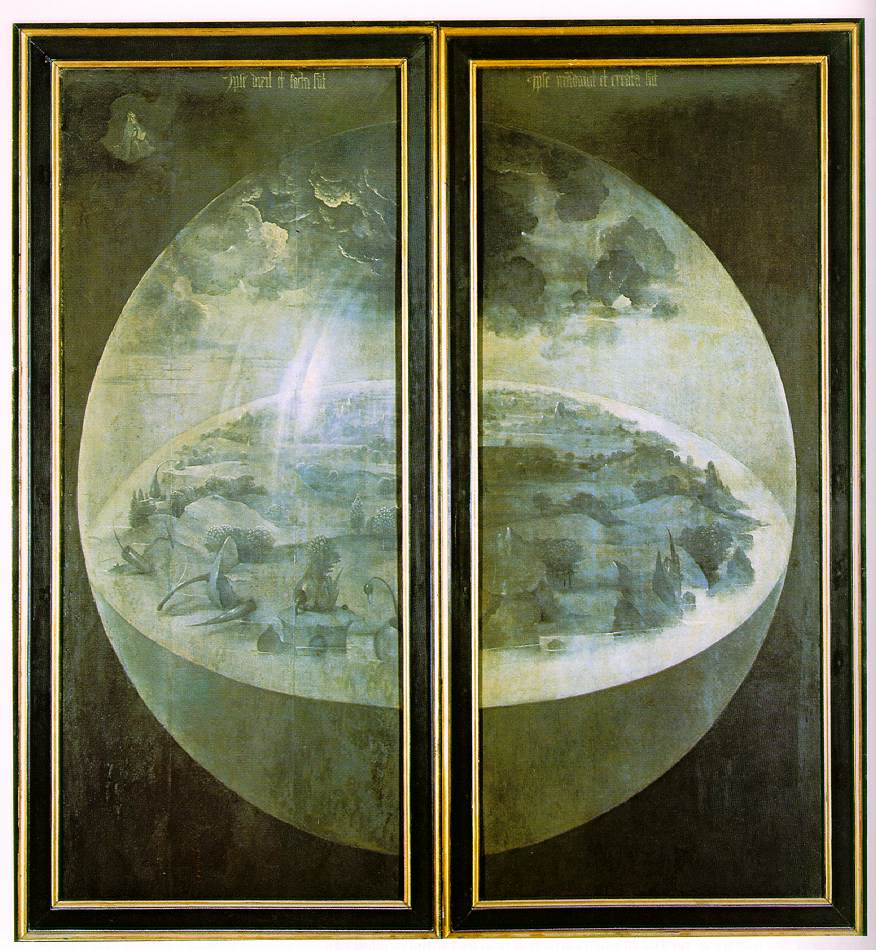
Creation on the exterior shutters of Hieronymus Bosch's triptych The Garden of Earthly Delights (c. 1490–1510)

The belief that God created the world out of nothing – ex nihilo – is central today to Judaism, Christianity, and Islam, and the medieval Jewish philosopher Maimonides felt it was the only concept that the three religions shared. Nonetheless, the concept is not found anywhere in the Hebrew Bible. The authors of Genesis 1 were concerned not with the origins of matter (the material which God formed into the habitable cosmos), but with assigning roles so that the cosmos should function. In the early 2nd century CE, early Christian scholars were beginning to see a tension between the idea of world-formation and the omnipotence of God, and by the beginning of the 3rd century creation ex nihilo had become a fundamental tenet of Christian theology.

Ex nihilo creation is found in creation stories from ancient Egypt, the Rig Veda, and many animistic cultures in Africa, Asia, Oceania, and North America. In most of these stories, the world is brought into being by the speech, dream, breath, or pure thought of a creator but creation ex nihilo may also take place through a creator's bodily secretions.

The literal translation of the phrase ex nihilo is "from nothing" but in many creation myths the line is blurred whether the creative act would be better classified as a creation ex nihilo or creation from chaos. In ex nihilo creation myths, the potential and the substance of creation springs from within the creator. Such a creator may or may not be existing in physical surroundings such as darkness or water, but does not create the world from them, whereas in creation from chaos the substance used for creation is pre-existing within the unformed void.

=== Creation from chaos ===
In creation from chaos myths, there is nothing initially but a formless, shapeless expanse. In these stories the word "chaos" means "disorder", and this formless expanse, which is also sometimes called a void or an abyss, contains the material with which the created world will be made. Chaos may be described as having the consistency of vapor or water, dimensionless, and sometimes salty or muddy. These myths associate chaos with evil and oblivion, in contrast to "order" (cosmos) which is the good. The act of creation is the bringing of order from disorder, and in many of these cultures it is believed that at some point the forces preserving order and form will weaken and the world will once again be engulfed into the abyss. One example is the Genesis creation narrative from the first chapter of the Book of Genesis.

=== World parent ===
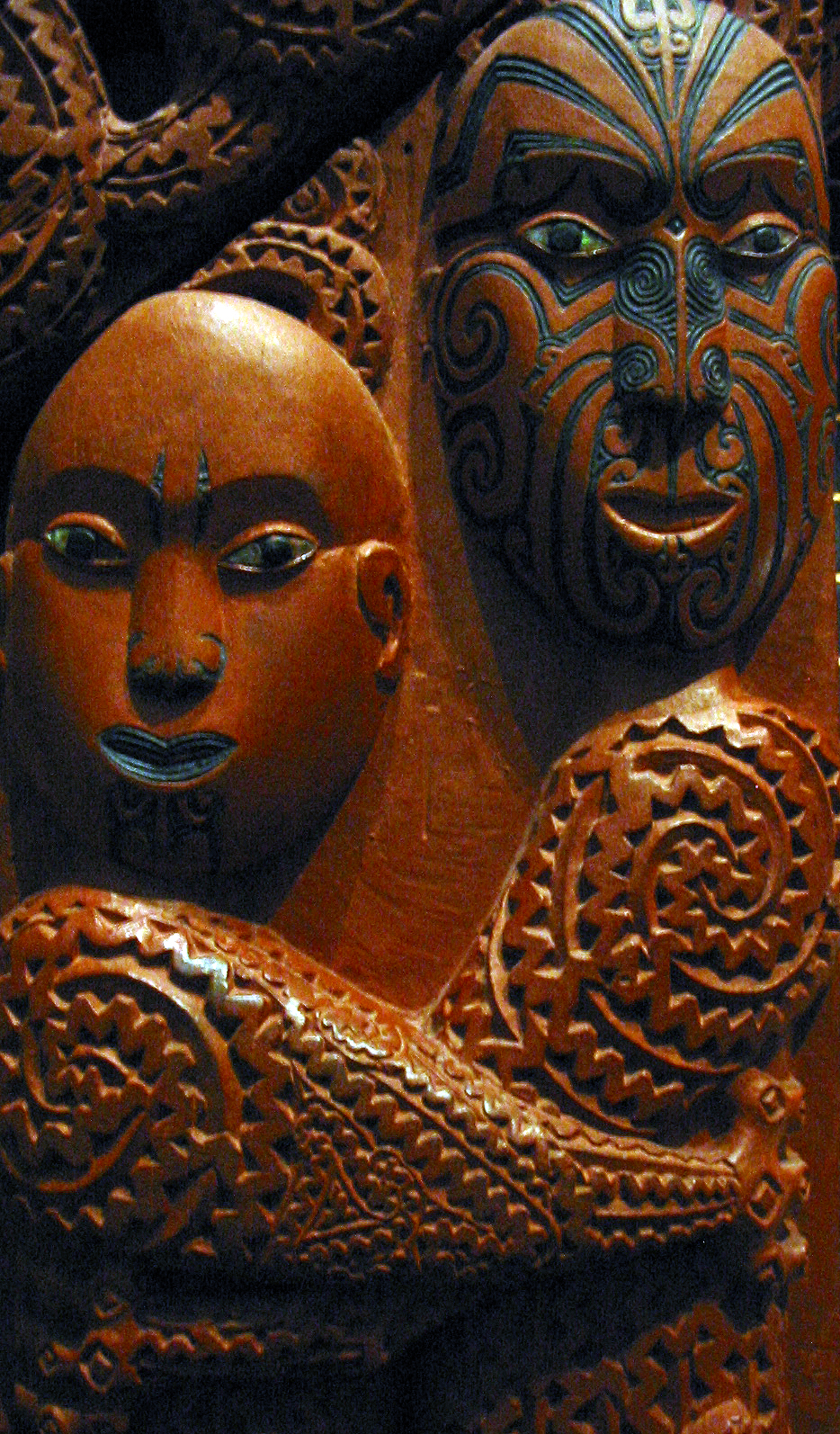
In one Maori creation myth, the primal couple are Rangi and Papa, depicted holding each other in a tight embrace.

There are two types of world parent myths, both describing a separation or splitting of a primeval entity, the world parent or parents. One form describes the primeval state as an eternal union of two parents, and the creation takes place when the two are pulled apart. The two parents are commonly identified as Sky (usually male) and Earth (usually female), who were so tightly bound to each other in the primeval state that no offspring could emerge. These myths often depict creation as the result of a sexual union and serve as genealogical record of the deities born from it.

In the second form of world parent myths, creation itself springs from dismembered parts of the body of the primeval being. Often, in these stories, the limbs, hair, blood, bones, or organs of the primeval being are somehow severed or sacrificed to transform into sky, earth, animal or plant life, and other worldly features. These myths tend to emphasize creative forces as animistic in nature rather than sexual, and depict the sacred as the elemental and integral component of the natural world. One example of this is the Norse creation myth described in "Völuspá", the first poem in the Poetic Edda, and in Gylfaginning.

=== Emergence ===
In emergence myths, humanity emerges from another world into the one they currently inhabit. The previous world is often considered the womb of the earth mother, and the process of emergence is likened to the act of giving birth. The role of midwife is usually played by a female deity, like the spider woman of several mythologies of Indigenous peoples in the Americas. Male characters rarely figure into these stories, and scholars often consider them in counterpoint to male-oriented creation myths, like those of the ex nihilo variety.

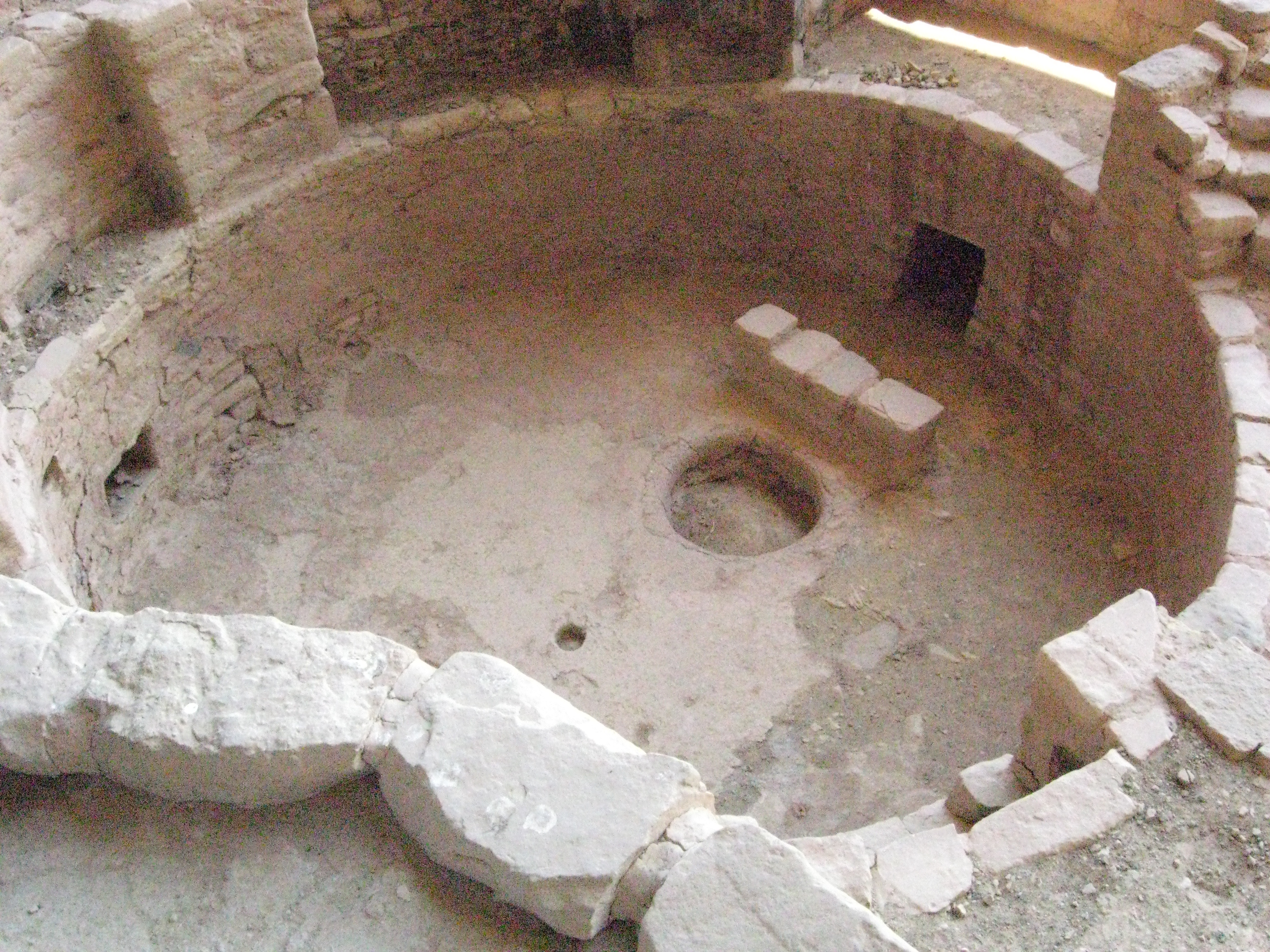
In the kiva of both ancient and present-day Pueblo peoples, the sipapu is a small round hole in the floor that represents the portal through which the ancestors first emerged. (The larger hole is a fire pit, here in a ruin from the Mesa Verde National Park.)

Emergence myths commonly describe the creation of people and/or supernatural beings as a staged ascent or metamorphosis from nascent forms through a series of subterranean worlds to arrive at their current place and form. Often the passage from one world or stage to the next is impelled by inner forces, a process of germination or gestation from earlier, embryonic forms. The genre is most commonly found in Native American cultures where the myths frequently link the final emergence of people from a hole opening to the underworld to stories about their subsequent migrations and eventual settlement in their current homelands.

=== Earth-diver ===
The earth-diver is a common character in various traditional creation myths. In these stories a supreme being usually sends an animal (most often a type of bird, but also crustaceans, insects, and fish in some narratives) into the primal waters to find bits of sand or mud with which to build habitable land. Some scholars interpret these myths psychologically while others interpret them cosmogonically. In both cases emphasis is placed on beginnings emanating from the depths.

==== Motif distribution ====
According to Gudmund Hatt and Tristram P. Coffin, Earth-diver myths are common in Native American folklore, among which Shoshone, Meskwaki, Blackfoot, Chipewyan, Newettee, Yokuts of California, Mandan, Hidatsa, Cheyenne, Arapaho, Ojibwe, Yuchi, and Cherokee.

American anthropologist Gladys Reichard located the distribution of the motif across "all parts of North America", save for "the extreme north, northeast, and southwest". David Adams Leeming pointed to its existence among the populations of the eastern United States. In a 1977 study, anthropologist Victor Barnouw surmised that the earth-diver motif appeared in "hunting-gathering societies", mainly among northerly groups such as the Hare, Dogrib, Kaska, Beaver, Carrier, Chipewyan, Sarsi, Cree, and Montagnais.

Similar tales are also found among the Chukchi and Yukaghir, the Tatars, and many Finno-Ugric traditions, as well as among the Buryat and the Samoyed. In addition, the earth-diver motif also exists in narratives from Eastern Europe, namely Romani, Romanian, Slavic (namely, Bulgarian, Polish, Ukrainian, and Belarusian), and Lithuanian mythological traditions.

The pattern of distribution of these stories suggest they have a common origin in the eastern Asiatic coastal region, spreading as peoples migrated west into Siberia and east to the North American continent. However, there are examples of this mytheme found well outside of this boreal distribution pattern, for example the West African Yoruba creation myth of Ọbatala and Oduduwa.

==== Native American narrative ====
Characteristic of many Native American myths, earth-diver creation stories begin as beings and potential forms linger asleep or suspended in the primordial realm. The earth-diver is among the first of them to awaken and lay the necessary groundwork by building suitable lands where the coming creation will be able to live. In many cases, these stories will describe a series of failed attempts to make land before the solution is found.

Among the indigenous peoples of the Americas, the earth-diver cosmogony is attested in Iroquois mythology: a female sky deity falls from the heavens, and certain animals, the beaver, the otter, the duck, and the muskrat dive in the waters to fetch mud to construct an island.

In a similar story from the Seneca, people lived in a sky realm. One day, the chief's daughter was afflicted with a mysterious illness, and the only cure recommended for her (revealed in a dream) was to lie beside a tree and to have it be dug up. The people do so, but a man complains that the tree was their livelihood, and kicks the girl through the hole. She ends up falling from the sky to a world of only water, but is rescued by waterfowl. A turtle offers to bear her on its shell, but asked where would be a definitive dwelling place for her. They decide to create land, and the toad dives into the depths of the primal sea to get pieces of soil. The toad puts it on the turtle's back, which grows larger with every deposit of soil.

In another version from the Wyandot, the Wyandot lived in heaven. The daughter of the Big Chief (or Mighty Ruler) was sick, so the medicine man recommends that they dig up the wild apple tree that stands next to the Lodge of the Mighty Ruler, because the remedy is to be found on its roots. However, as the tree has been dug out, the ground begins to sink away, and the treetops catch and carry down the sick daughter with it. As the girl falls from the skies, two swans rescue her on their backs. The birds decide to summon all the Swimmers and the Water Tribes. Many volunteer to dive into the Great Water to fetch bits of earth from the bottom of the sea, but only the toad (female, in the story) is the one successful.

== See also ==
- Abiogenesis
- Anthropology of religion
- Australian Aboriginal religion and mythology
- Big Bang
- Ceremonial pole
- Chinese creation myths
- Creationism
  - Young Earth creationism
- Creator deity
- Evolutionary origin of religion
- Mother goddess
- Origin myth
- Origin of death
- Religious cosmology
- Theism
- Xirang

== Bibliography ==
- Ashkenazi, Michael (2008). Handbook of Japanese mythology (illustrated ed.). OUP (US). ISBN 978-0-19-533262-9.
- Barbour, Ian G. (1997). Religion and Science: Historical and Contemporary Issues (first revised ed.). HarperSanFrancisco. pp. 58, 65. ISBN 978-0-06-060938-2.
- Bastian, Dawn E.; Mitchell, Judy K. (2004). Handbook of Native American Mythology. Santa Barbara: ABC-CLIO. ISBN 978-1-85109-533-9.
- Boas, Franz (1916). "Tsimshian Mythology". Annual Report of the Bureau of American Ethnography. U.S. Government Printing Office: 651.
- Bodde, Derk (1961). "Myths of Ancient China". In Samuel Noah Kramer (ed.). Mythologies of the Ancient World. Anchor.
- Booth, Anna Birgitta (1984). "Creation myths of the North American Indians". In Alan Dundes (ed.). Sacred Narrative: Readings in the Theory of Myth. University of California Press. ISBN 978-0-520-05192-8.
- Courlander, Harold (2002). A Treasury of African Folklore: The Oral Literature, Traditions, Myths, Legends, Epics, Tales, Recollections, Wisdom, Sayings, and Humor of Africa. Marlowe & Company. ISBN 978-1-56924-536-1.
- "Creation Myth". Merriam-Webster's Encyclopedia of World Religions. Merriam-Webster. Merriam-Webster. 1999. ISBN 978-0-87779-044-0.
- Doty, William (2007). Myth: A Handbook. University Alabama Press. ISBN 978-0-8173-5437-4.
- Eliade, Mircea (1963). Patterns in comparative religion. The New American Library-Meridian Books. ISBN 978-0-529-01915-8.
- Eliade, Mircea (1964). Myth and Reality. Allen & Unwin. ISBN 978-0-04-291001-7.
- Frank; Leaman, Oliver (2004). History of Jewish Philosophy. Psychology Press. ISBN 978-0-415-32469-4.
- Frankfort, Henri (1977). The Intellectual Adventure of Ancient Man: An Essay on Speculative Thought in the Ancient Near East. University of Chicago Press. ISBN 978-0226260082.
- Giddens, Sandra; Giddens, Owen (2006). African Mythology. The Rosen Publishing Group. ISBN 978-1-4042-0768-4.
- Honko, Lauri (1984). "The Problem of Defining Myth". In Alan Dundes (ed.). Sacred Narrative: Readings in the Theory of Myth. University of California Press. ISBN 978-0-520-05192-8.
- Johnston, Susan A. (2009). Religion, Myth, and Magic: The Anthropology of Religion-a Course Guide. Recorded Books, LLC. ISBN 978-1-4407-2603-3.
- Kimball, Charles (2008). "Creation Myths and Sacred Stories". Comparative Religion. The Teaching Company. ISBN 978-1-59803-452-3.
- Knappert, Jan (1977). Bantu Myths and Other Tales. Brill Archive. ISBN 978-90-04-05423-3.
- Leeming, David Adams; Leeming, Margaret Adams (1994). Encyclopedia of Creation Myths (2nd ed.). ABC-CLIO. ISBN 978-0-87436-739-3.
- Leeming, David A. (2001). Myth: A Biography of Belief. Oxford University Press. ISBN 978-0-19-514288-4.
- Leeming, David Adams; Leeming, Margaret Adams (2009). A Dictionary of Creation Myths (Oxford Reference Online ed.). Oxford University Press. ISBN 978-0-19-510275-8.
- Leeming, David A. (2010). Creation Myths of the World (2nd ed.). ABC-CLIO. ISBN 978-1-59884-174-9.
- Leeming, David A. (2011a). "Creation". The Oxford Companion to World Mythology (online ed.). Oxford University Press. ISBN 978-0195156690.
- Leeming, David A. (2011b). "Earth-Diver Creation". The Oxford companion to world mythology (online ed.). Oxford University Press. ISBN 978-0195102758.
- Leonard, Scott A; McClure, Michael (2004). Myth and Knowing (illustrated ed.). McGraw-Hill. ISBN 978-0-7674-1957-4.
- Littleton, C. Scott (2005). Gods, goddesses, and mythology. Vol. 1. Marshall Cavendish. ISBN 978-0-7614-7559-0.
- Long, Charles H. (1963). Alpha: The Myths of Creation. New York: George Braziller.
- MacClaglan, David (1977). Creation Myths: Man's Introduction to the World. Thames & Hudson. ISBN 978-0-500-81010-1.
- Mair, Victor H. (1990). Tao Te Ching: The Classic Book of Integrity and the Way, by Lao Tzu. Bantam Books. ISBN 978-0-553-07005-7.
- McMullin, Ernan (2010). "Creation ex nihilo: early history". In Burrell, David B.; Cogliati, Carlo; Soskice, Janet M.; Stoeger, William R. (eds.). Creation and the God of Abraham. Cambridge University Press. ISBN 978-1139490788.
- May, Gerhard (2004). Creatio ex nihilo (English trans. of 1994 ed.). T&T Clarke International. ISBN 978-0567083562.
- "myth". Encyclopædia Britannica. Encyclopædia Britannica Online. 2009.
- Nassen-Bayer; Stuart, Kevin (October 1992). "Mongol creation stories: man, Mongol tribes, the natural world and Mongol deities". Asian Folklore Studies. 2. 51 (2): 323–34. doi:10.2307/1178337. JSTOR 1178337.
- Nebe, Gottfried (2002). "Creation in Paul's Theology". In Hoffman, Yair; Reventlow, Henning Graf (eds.). Creation in Jewish and Christian Tradition. Sheffield Academic Press. ISBN 978-0567573933.
- Pettazzoni, Raffaele; Rose, H A (1954). Essays on the History of Religions. E J Brill.
- Segal, Robert (2004). Myth: A Very Short Introduction. Oxford University Press. ISBN 978-0-19-280347-4.
- Soskice, Janet M. (2010). "Creatio ex nihilo: its Jewish and Christian foundations". In Burrell, David B.; Cogliati, Carlo; Soskice, Janet M.; Stoeger, William R. (eds.). Creation and the God of Abraham. Cambridge University Press. ISBN 978-1139490788.
- Sproul, Barbara C. (1979). Primal Myths. HarperOne HarperCollinsPublishers. ISBN 978-0-06-067501-1.
- Stocker, Terry (2009). The Paleolithic Paradigm. AuthorHouse. ISBN 978-1-4490-2292-1.
- Sweetman, James Windrow (2002). Islam and Christian Theology. James Clarke & Co. ISBN 978-0-227-17203-2.
- Thomas, Cullen (2008). Brother One Cell: An American Coming of Age in South Korea's Prisons. Penguin. ISBN 978-0-14-311311-9.
- Walton, John H. (2006). Ancient Near Eastern Thought and the Old Testament: Introducing the Conceptual World of the Hebrew Bible. Baker Academic. ISBN 978-0-8010-2750-5.
- Wasilewska, Ewa (2000). Creation stories of the Middle East. Jessica Kingsley Publishers. ISBN 978-1-85302-681-2.
- Wheeler-Voegelin, Erminie; Moore, Remedios W. (1957). "The Emergence Myth in Native North America". In W. Edson Richmond (ed.). Studies in Folklore, in Honor of Distinguished Service Professor Stith Thompson. Indiana University Press. ISBN 978-0-8371-6208-9.
- Weigle, Marta (1987). "Creation and Procreation, Cosmogony and Childbirth: Reflections on Ex Nihilo Earth Diver, and Emergence Mythology". Journal of American Folklore. 100 (398): 426–35. doi:10.2307/540902. JSTOR 540902.
- Winzeler, Robert L. (2008). Anthropology and religion: what we know, think, and question. AltaMira Press. ISBN 978-0-7591-1046-5.
- Womack, Mari (2005). Symbols and Meaning: A Concise Introduction. AltaMira Press. ISBN 978-0-7591-0322-1.
- Y.Z. (June 1824). "Some Account of the Tangousians in general and the Transbaikal Tangousians in particular". Asiatic Journal and Monthly Miscellany. 17.
