= Borys Lankosz =

Polish film director (born 1973)

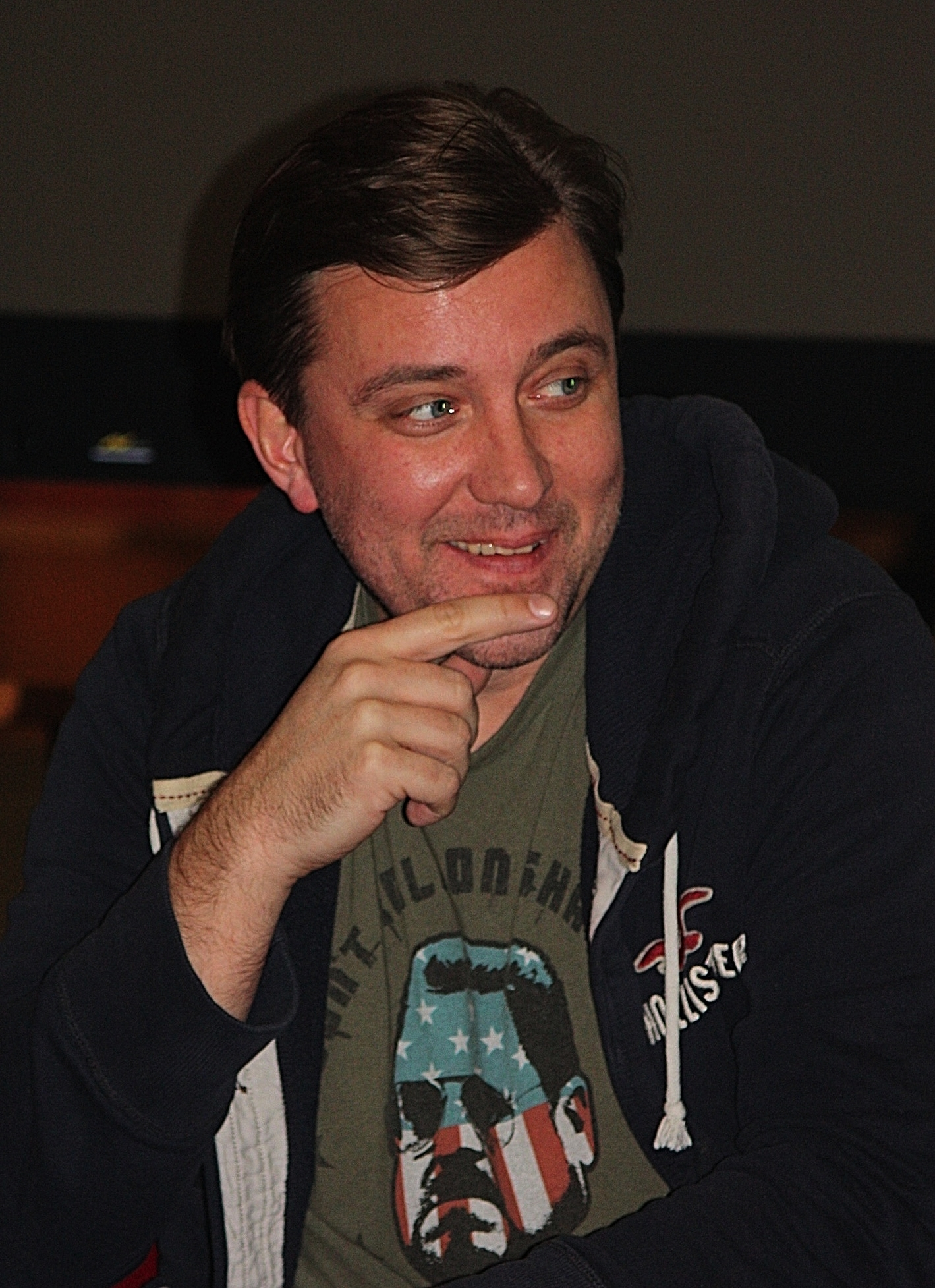
- Born: 31 March 1973 (age 53); Kraków, Poland
- Occupations: Film director, screenwriter

Borys Lankosz (Polish: [ˈbɔrɘs ˈlankɔʂ]; born 31 March 1973, Kraków) is a Polish film director.

He graduated from the National Film School in Łódź. His debut film "Evolution" (2001) received several awards, i.a. the Golden Gate Award at the San Francisco International Film Festival. He is the creator of the documentary series From a Different Angle, filmed in Iran, China and Zimbabwe, and the films Kurc and Poles Poles (with Wislawa Szymborska, Stanislaw Lem, Krzysztof Penderecki).

His feature debut titled Rewers (Reverse) won first prize, the Golden Lion, at the Polish Film Festival in 2009 in Gdynia. Lankosz is also a director and screenwriter of several documentary and short films: Radegast (documentary film), Alien VI (short).

His thriller “A Grain of Truth”, where the phantoms of medieval antisemitism seem to reappear in a contemporary small Polish town, was a box office hit of 2015.

== Education ==
Lankosz is a graduate of the National Film School in Łódź, which counts directors such as Roman Polanski and Krzysztof Kieślowski among its graduates, where he studied under Polish film director Wojciech Has.

== Career ==
=== Documentaries ===
Lankosz's diploma film, a 2001 documentary entitled Evolution, won the 45th San Francisco International Film Festival as well as many other international and Polish film festivals. The jury in San Francisco decided to award the film "because of its remarkable mood, tone and beauty." According to the jury, Evolution's "every shot, cut, sound effect conspires to involve the audience in its tense, astonishing and provocative world. [...] Its grip is unrelenting, and lasts long after its beautiful final moments."

This film marked a clear direction in Lankosz's creative work which would follow. The central themes of this work revolve around notions of otherness and the attempt to come to terms with it through the medium of film.

The success of his first film Evolution, opened many doors at the outset of the young director's career. In proceeding years, with the Polish Television as the producer, Lankosz made many documentary films which won the acclaim of audiences, critics, and awards at prestigious international film festivals. Among the most notable of which are: Poles Poles, a documentary about some of the most eminent Polish figures (such as Nobel prize-winning poet Wisława Szymborska, as well as the legendary science fiction writer and author of Solaris, Stanisław Lem, among others) and Radegast, a harrowing documentary tale about Western European Jews, who in 1941 were sent to the Łódź ghetto, which received the Silver Phoenix Award at the International Film Festival Jewish Motifs in Warsaw, the Finalist Award Winner of The New York Festivals, as well as being awarded a Monumentum Iudaicum Lodzense Medal.

Borys Lankosz is also the author of a film series entitled From the Different Angle, filmed in China, Zimbabwe, Iran and France. This four-part series was broadcast in prime time by the first channel of the public Polish Television (TVP).

=== Feature films ===
In 2009, Lankosz directed his first feature film Reverse, which became a staggering success and marked a new direction in his work. The film was produced by legendary film studio Kadr, responsible for the creation of the most important, now classic films of the so-called Polish Film School of the 1950s and 1960s. Reverse, the studio's first production in over fourteen years, turned out to be a smashing success. Already at its premiere at the Polish Film Festival in Gdynia, Reverse was heralded as the forerunner of a "New Wave" of Polish cinema, and Lankosz himself was appointed its patron.

Moreover, Reverse won the acclamation of the jury, winning 11 of the festival's awards, including the prestigious Golden Lion Award for Best Film. Other notable awards included: the Audience Award and the selection of the film as the Poland's official entry for the Academy Award for Best Foreign language film Oscar.

Borys Lankosz became the center of massive media attention, whose goal was to turn him into a celebrity, an attempt which he effectively evaded. He did however joyously accept two distinguished awards: one from the Minister of Culture and National Heritage who bestowed upon him the Artist of the Year Award; as well as the prestigious Paszport Polityki, an award granted by the magazine Polityka for an artistic event which was the "best debut of at least a decade."

Recently Lankosz completed thriller A Grain of Truth an adaptation of Polish bestselling novel by Zygmunt Miłoszewski, which was named novel of the year by Polish biggest bookstore chain Empik, was published in UK, US, France and Israel. According to NPR Books A Grain of Truth, like every great crime novel, digs up more unsettling questions than it does answer; it also demonstrates the seemingly endless possibilities of the form itself to serve as smart social criticism. Who knows? Maybe 2013 will be the year Poland snatches the crime fiction crown away from the Swedes and Norwegians. The movie, which was directed, co-written and produced by Lankosz premiered January 2015.

Lankosz is now in pre-production of his next project, adaptation of another bestselling novel Dark, Almost Night by Joanna Bator a winner of Poland's leading literary award NIKE. Dark, Almost Night is a cruel tale that invites viewers to a labyrinth of tangled tales and legends of Waldenburg, once a German city, that became a part of Poland after World War II. In the company of the central character, Alicja Tabor, who is a newspaper reporter, we will learn the painful history of her family and those closely connected with it, which goes back to World War II. she discovers the truth about herself and her own tragic childhood, over which a shadow was cast by her mother's madness and the death of her sister, who was obsessed with the legend of Książ Castle and its beautiful resident, Princess Daisy, who was under a curse. Referring to the Gothic the book offers serious thoughts about a world that is permeated by evil (which here becomes personified in the mysterious "cat-eaters"), suffering in the historical past, madness and the tragedy of those who are too sensitive to bear the weight of it all. The past turns out to be a difficult, if not insuperable burden, history likes to repeat itself, and the demons can reawaken at any moment. And somewhere beyond these reflections of a general nature, the story of the heroine's loneliness is being told too, a woman who is incapable of entering into a deep, satisfying relationship with another person. Bator describes it all in language where simplicity appears alongside lyricism, and legend alternates with raw modernity.

=== Television ===
Lankosz directed a modern crime story TV series Paradoks (2012) as well as two-part TV musical Memoir of Ms. Hannah (2013), set in late 30. in bourgeois Warsaw. Starry cast "Memoir of Ms. Hannah" follows a young and attractive woman (Joanna Kulig) who by careless romance gets involved in a spy affair.

=== Theatre ===
In 2014 Borys Lankosz made his debut in theatre. He directed a French play Le Repas des faves by Vahe Katcha in one of the most popular theaters in Warsaw, Polonia Theatre. 1942, occupied France. Seven friends get together to celebrate the anniversary of their host. The event takes place under the best auspices, until at the foot of their building are slaughtered two German officers. In retaliation, the Gestapo demands they designate two hostages from among themselves .

== Reception of Rewers ==
Soon after its premiere, it became evident that this modest black and white film about Stalinist Poland (now a subject of research of film theorists as well as sociologists), was to become a box office hit, which in the Polish domestic market effectively competes with the biggest Hollywood hits such as Twilight Saga or 2012.

Pre-premiere screenings of Rewers at the oldest Warsaw cinema Wisła became the site of meetings of the Polish intelligentsia and "high society," renewing a forgotten Polish tradition of spontaneous post-screening meetings and film discussions. Rewers became a cultural event incomparable to anything which was previously known to the Polish public.

In conjunction with an Oscar promotional campaign, Rewers was shown in New York City at MOMA and the Directors Guild of America Theatre.

Rewers was also very well received by American film critics as evidenced by reviews which appeared in Variety and The Hollywood Reporter.

The Polish Film Academy nominated Rewers for the Polish Film Awards: Eagles in 13 categories, eventually granting awards in eight of those, among them the Best Film Award. Rewers set a new record for the number of awards granted, surpassing the previous record held by Roman Polanski's film The Pianist.

Soon thereafter, awards began to appear on the international arena. Rewers received FIPRESCI Award at the Warsaw Film Festival; the St. George Award at the Moscow International Film Festival; as well as the Grand Jury Prize for Best New Director at the Seattle International Film Festival. The decision of the latter award was articulated by the jury as follows: "Borys Lankosz’s Rewers succeeds its substantial ambition to tell the story of love, family, and loyalty in a brutal post war Warsaw. Uniquely, first time director Lankosz manages to deliver a highly stylized vision without sacrificing character, story, or performance. We are happy and honored to give the Best New Director Award to this touching, thrilling, and deeply human film."

== Personal life ==
Borys Lankosz is married to Magdalena Lankosz and has a step-son Antoni.

== Filmography ==
- Dark, Almost Night - Director, Writer
- Autor Solaris - Director
- A Grain of Truth ("Ziarno prawdy") - Director, Writer, Producer
- Reverse (Rewers) – Director
- Alien VI (Obcy VI) – Director
- Radegast – Director
- Kurc – Director, Writer
- Poles Poles – Director, Writer
- Evolution (Rozwój) – Director, Writer

== Awards ==
Rewers

- Seattle International Film Festival 2010 – Grand Jury Prize for Best New Director
- Moscow International Film Festival 2010 - St. George Award
- Warsaw International Film Festival 2009 – FIPRESCI Award
- Polish Film Awards: Eagles 2010 - Best Picture, Discovery of the year
- Polish Film Festival Gdynia 2009 - Grand Prix Jury Golden Lion, Don Kichot Award, Journalists’ Award, Arthouse Cinemas Association Award, Audience Award
- Paszport Polityki 2010
- Ministry of Culture and National Heritage Award 2010 - Artist of the year
- Tarnów Film Award 2010 - Special Jury Award, Audience Award

Radegast

- The New York Festivals 2010 – Finalist Certificate
- International Film Festival Jewish Motifs 2009 – Silver Phoenix for Best Documentary
- Man in Danger Festival 2009 – Monumentum Iudaicum Lodzense Foundation Award

Evolution

- San Francisco International Film Festival 2002 – Golden Gate Award
- Kraków Film Festival 2002 - Silver Dragon Award for Best Documentary Director
- Kraków Film Festival 2002 - Bronze Hobby Horse Award

Alien VI

- International Film Festival Jewish Motifs 2008 – Silver Phoenix Award for Best Short

Kurc

- Summer Frames Films Festival 2006 – Best Documentary

== See also ==
- Rewers
- Borys Lankosz profile on imdb.com https://www.imdb.com/name/nm1346665/
- Borys Lankosz profile on filmpolski.pl http://www.filmpolski.pl/fp/index.php/419041
- Borys Lankosz profile on Directors' Guild of Poland http://polishdirectors.com/en/member_post/lankosz-borys/
