= Zygmunt Miłoszewski =

Polish journalist and writer

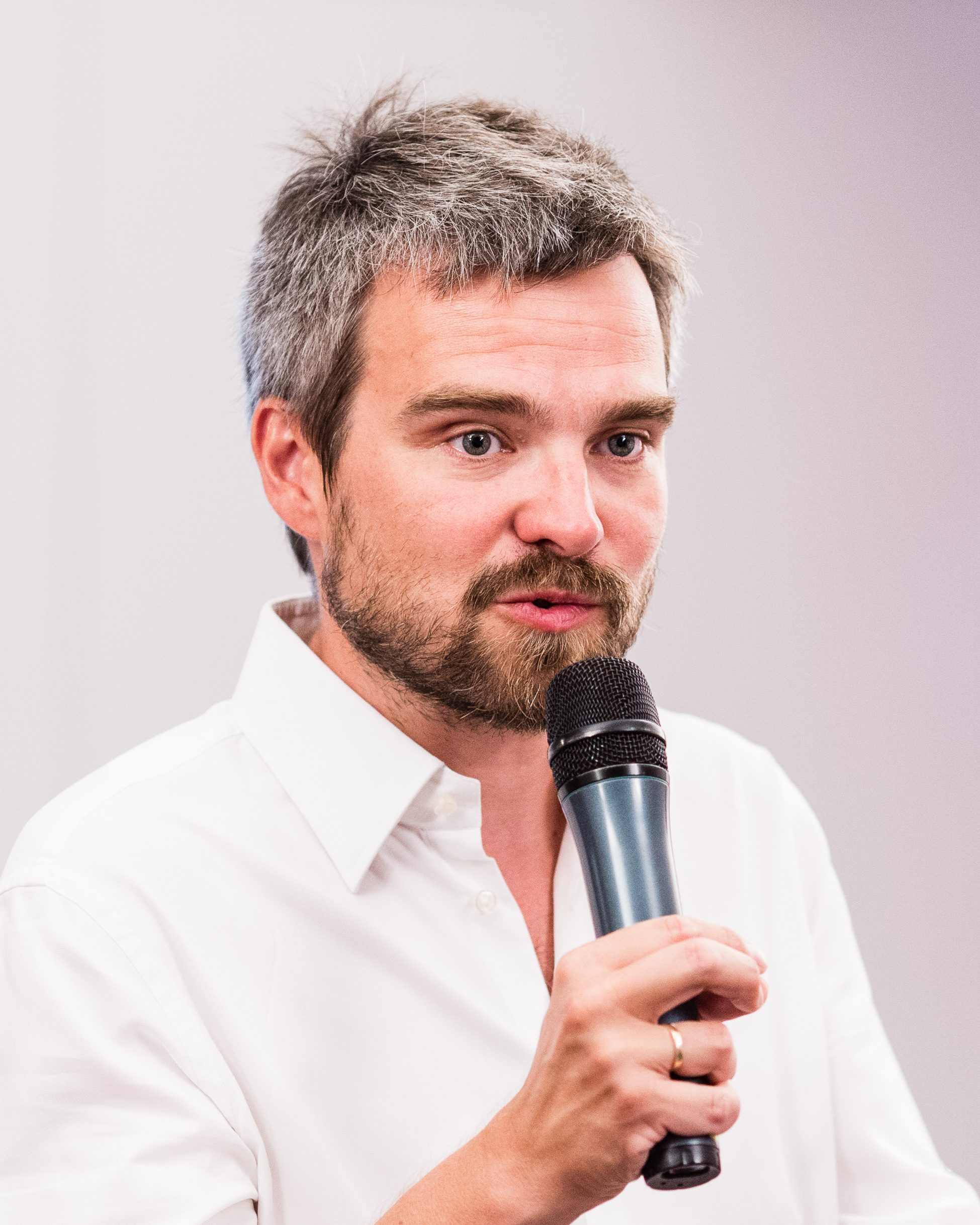
Zygmunt Miłoszewski, 2019

Zygmunt Miłoszewski (born May 8, 1976 in Warsaw) is a Polish writer. Previously he was a journalist and editor for the Polish edition of Newsweek. He is an author of novels, features and short stories.

== Novels ==
Zygmunt Miłoszewski published his first novel Domofon ("The Intercom") in 2005. It is a horror/mystery story about a group of people trapped in a haunted block of flats. Film Studio Zebra and Juliusz Machulski bought the rights for a film adaptation of Domofon.

His second novel was The Adder Mountains ("Góry Zmijowe"), a fantasy for younger readers.

His third book, Entanglement ("Uwikłanie"), Miłoszewski's biggest success so far, is a crime novel for which Miłoszewski was awarded the High Calibre Prize for the Best Polish Crime Novel of the Year 2007 ("Nagroda Wielkiego Kalibru dla najlepszej polskiej powieści kryminalnej i sensacyjnej roku 2007"). Entanglement was published in the UK and US in 2010 by Bitter Lemon Press.

The next instalment of Entanglement's protagonist, prosecutor Teodor Szacki, A Grain of Truth ("Ziarno Prawdy"') was published on October 5, 2011 in Poland, and in 2012 in the UK and US by Bitter Lemon Press. The next part was announced to be published in 2013.

All of Miłoszewski's books have been translated into a number of languages, including English, French and German.

A Grain of Truth ("Ziarno Prawdy") was awarded the High Calibre Prize for the Best Polish Crime Novel of the Year 2011 ("Nagroda Wielkiego Kalibru dla najlepszej polskiej powieści kryminalnej i sensacyjnej roku 2011").

== Critical reception ==
Publishers Weekly (June 28, 2010) wrote about Miłoszewski's novel Entanglement and gave it a starred review:

Miloszewski takes an engaging look at modern Polish society in this stellar first in a new series starring Warsaw prosecutor Teodor Szacki. (...) Szacki, who's undergoing a midlife crisis and has ambivalent feelings about his wife, considers an affair with journalist hoping to get exclusive details on his inquiry. Readers will want to see more of the complex, sympathetic Szacki.

For "A Grain of Truth" Zygmunt Miloszewski got his next starred review in Publishers Weekly (11/19/2012):

A smart plot, an engagingly acerbic lead, and a nuanced portrayal of 2009 Poland lift Miloszewski’s second mystery featuring Warsaw prosecutor Teodor Szacki (after "Entanglement").

== Film adaptations ==
Studio Filmowe Zebra bought the rights to "Domofon", Miloszewski's first novel. The third Miłoszewski novel, Entanglement was adapted for the big screen by film director Jacek Bromski (Love in the Year of the Tiger). It was released in Poland on June 3, 2011. Producers (Juliusz Machulski and Wojciech Danowski) assembled a cast including Polish film stars Maja Ostaszewska (Katyń), Marek Bukowski (Nad rzeką, której nie ma), Andrzej Seweryn (Schindler's List), Piotr Adamczyk (Karol: A Man Who Became Pope) and Olgierd Łukaszewicz (Generał Nil).

Entanglement was produced by Studio Filmowe Zebra with the support of the Polish Film Institute. The film was shot by cinematographer Marcin Koszałka (Rewers).

A Grain of Truth was directed by Borys Lankosz and premiered nationally on January 30th, 2015.

== Bibliography ==
- Entanglement, 2007, ISBN 978-1-904738-44-2. English edition: Bitter Lemon Press, London 2010 (trans. by Antonia Lloyd-Jones). First published in Polish as Uwikłanie by Wydawnictwo W.A.B., 2007.
- A Grain of Truth, 2011, ISBN 978-1-908524-02-7. English edition: Bitter Lemon Press, London 2012 (trans. by Antonia Lloyd-Jones). First published in Polish as Ziarno prawdy by Wydawnictwo W.A.B., 2011.
- Rage, 2012, ISBN 978-1503935860, English edition: 2016 (translated by Antonia Lloyd-Jones). First published in Polish as Gniew by Wydawnictwo W.A.B., 2012.
- Priceless, 2018, ISBN 978-1503941434, English edition: Amazon Crossing, Seattle 2018 (trans. Antonia Lloyd-Jones). First published in Polish as Bezcenny by Wydawnictwo W.A.B., 2013.

== Notes and references ==
- Zygmunt Miłoszewski at Culture.pl
- bitterlemonpress
- bitterlemonpress press_and_reviews
- wab.com
- Publishers Weekly Reviews
- cineuropa.org
