= A Grain of Truth =

2014 film directed by Borysa Lankosza

A Grain of Truth (Polish: Ziarno prawdy) is a 2015 Polish film directed by Borys Lankosz, film adaptation of the novel of the same title by Zygmunt Miłoszewski.

The filming period lasted from April 30 to May 27, 2014. It was shot in Sandomierz, Śmiłów, Wysiadłów (gas station), Chełmno (cathedral), Otwock, Warsaw, and Lublin. The national premiere took place on January 30, 2015, and the world premiere on January 19, 2015.

== Plot ==
The naked body of a young woman is found under the Sandomierz synagogue. Prosecutor Teodor Szacki begins a murder investigation. It turns out that the corpse of the woman was bled, and the expert says that the murder weapon found on the spot is used during ritual slaughter of animals. Linking to the dark history of ritual murders of children triggers anti-Semitic mood. Aiming to find out the truth, Szacki will find that there is a grain of truth in every story that can trigger a spiral of crime in the right place at the right time.

== Cast ==
- Robert Więckiewicz – Teodor Szacki
- Jerzy Trela – Leon Wilczur
- Magdalena Walach – Barbara Sobieraj
- Aleksandra Hamkało – Klara
- Joanna Sydor – Elżbieta Budnik
- Krzysztof Pieczyński – Grzegorz Budnik
- Andrzej Zieliński – Jerzy Szyller
- Zohar Strauss – rabin Zygmunt
- Modest Ruciński – Roman Myszyński
- Iwona Bielska – Maria Miszczyk
- Jacek Poniedziałek – Klejnocki
- Marcin Juchniewicz – Rzeźnicki
- Andrzej Konopka – Marszałek (police officer)
- Zbigniew Konopka – Wojtuś (police officer)
