= Ed Seeman =

American cartoonist (1931–2025)

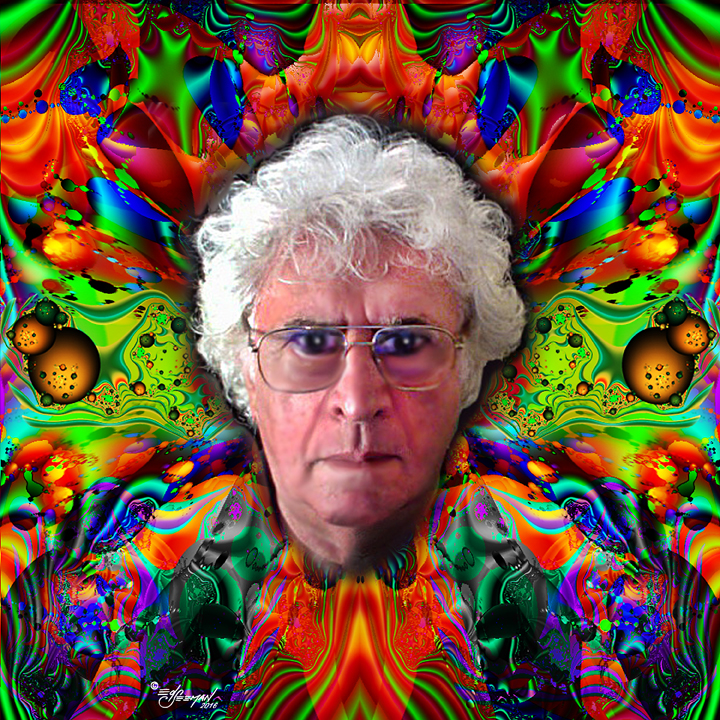
- Ed Seeman self-portrait
- Born: July 16, 1931; New York City, U.S.
- Died: February 4, 2025 (aged 93); Ocala, Florida, U.S.
- Other name: Eduardo Cemano
- Spouses: Marilyn Sofer; Amy Seeman
- Awards: 1967 Clio award, Luden's Cough Drops commercial; 1968 Cine Golden Eagle Award, Mothers of Invention; 1970 Silver Phoenix award, Atlanta International Film Festival, "World's Best Experimental Film" for short movie Space Oddity; 1981 Emmy award, The Great Space Coaster

Edward Seeman (July 16, 1931 – February 4, 2025), also known by the pseudonym Eduardo Cemano, was an American artist. His works spanned disparate fields, from animated television commercials for children to films of artistic nudity and hardcore pornography. He was also known for his cinemaphotography and for his work with Frank Zappa in the 1960s.

== Career ==
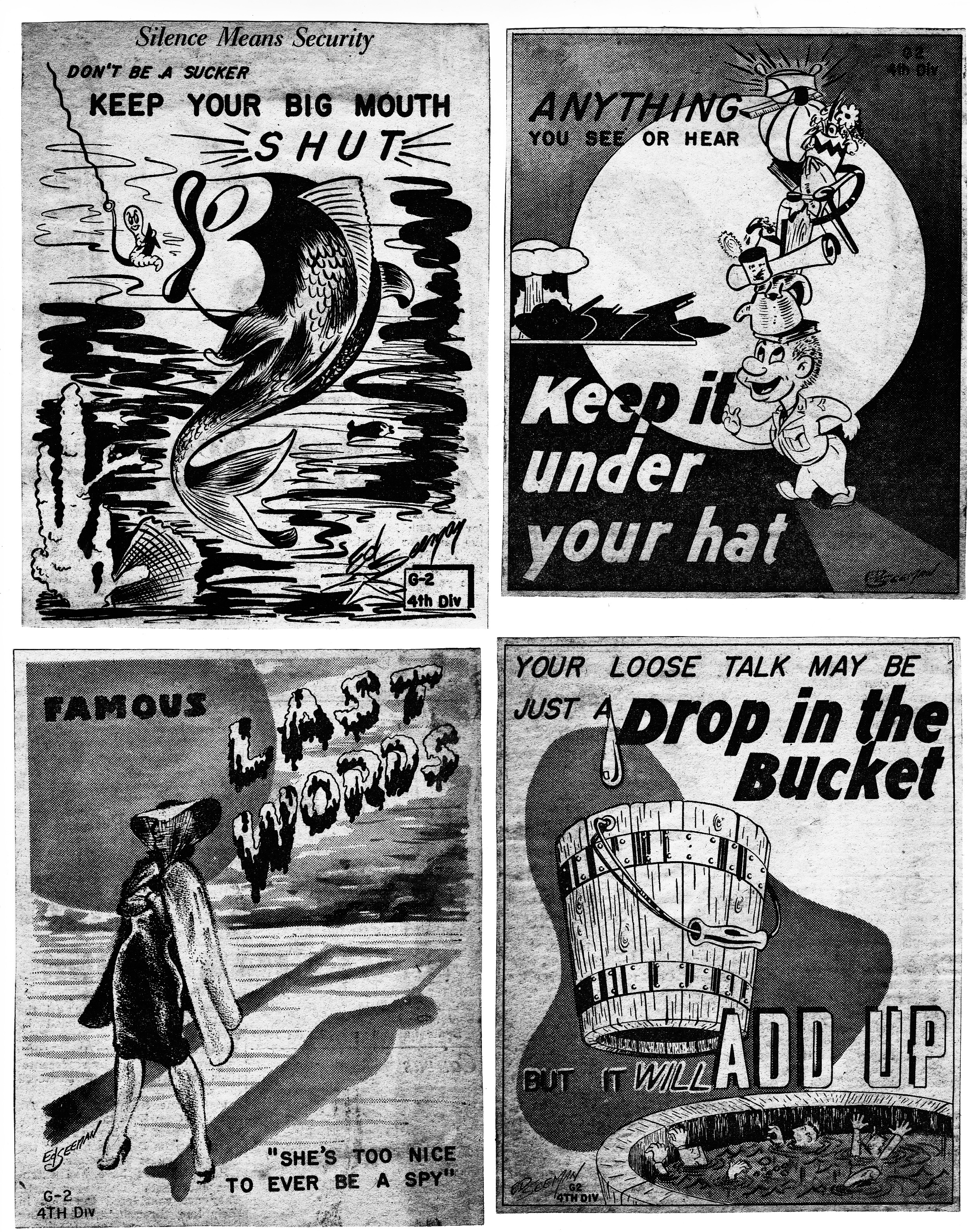
OPSEC adverts from c.1953, from the 4th Infantry Division's Ivy Leaves newspaper, by Seeman

Seeman was born in New York in 1931, and attended both the High School of Music & Art and the Pratt Institute. He began his animation career at Paramount Pictures, making animation cels for shows such as Popeye the Sailorman and Casper the Friendly Ghost. He won several awards for his work, including Clios and ADDYs.

Seeman's career was interrupted when he was drafted into the U.S. Army. He served in Frankfurt with the 4th Infantry Division from 1952 to 1954. Seeman produced cartoons for Army's internal information program.

After returning from military service, Seeman and his partner Ray Favata began the media company Gryphon Productions, which ran from about 1960 to 1969. They produced commercials using cartoon characters, including the Trix rabbit, Sugar Bear and My Little Pony.

In 1967 Seeman paid Frank Zappa $2,000 to produce music for a Luden's cough drops television commercial. Zappa's music was matched with Seeman's animation and the advertisement won a Clio Award for "Best Use of Sound". An alternate version of the soundtrack, called "The Big Squeeze", later appeared on Zappa's posthumous 1996 album "The Lost Episodes". The completed soundtrack version includes narration from Seeman.

Seeman also produced other films with Zappa, such as the 14-hour montage Uncle Meat, for which he won a Cine Golden Eagle Award. In 1981 Seeman and Favata won an Emmy Award for their work on the intro to the children's television show The Great Space Coaster.

Seeman also produced and directed a number of pornographic films, such as The Healers, Fongaluli, and Madame Zenobia, which were marketed outside the US.

== Death ==
Seeman died at home in Ocala, Florida, on February 4, 2025. He was 93.

== Films ==
=== Film festival ===
- Frekoba, 1968, dancer Frances Alenikoff
- Dana and Clay, 1969, dancers Dana Wolfe and Clay Taliaferro
- High Contrast, 1969
- Space Oddities, 1970
- Incubus c. 1971, dancer Frances Alenikoff

=== Frank Zappa ===
- Electric Circus, c. 1967
- Rehearsal, c. 1967
- Sex, Paint and Sound, c. 1967
- Mothers of Invention,1968

Also known as:
- Uncle Meat (40-minute version)
- Frank Zappa and the Original Mothers of Invention, video cassette version of film, 1987
- The Real Uncle Meat
- Raw Meat
- Suzy Creamcheese What's Got Into You?

Seeman contributed motion picture photography for Frank Zappa's:

- The Burnt Weeny Sandwich (unpublished)
- Uncle Meat 14 hrs version (the footage of the Mothers of Invention) (parts of it were shown publicly, but the whole was unpublished)

=== As Eduardo Cemano, sex industry films ===
- Millie's Homecoming, 1971
- The Weirdos and the Oddballs (aka Zora Knows Best), 1971
- The Healers, 1972
- Fongaluli, 1972, also named Aphrodisiac and The Love Potion
- Madame Zenobia, 1973

=== Eduardo Cemano short films ===
- Blushing Nude
- Cucumber
- Floating Nudes

== Gallery ==
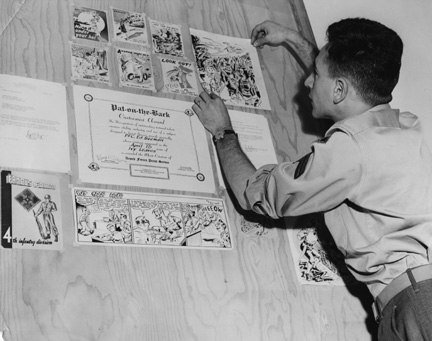
Circa 1953, Corporal Ed Seeman putting up a display of his artwork and the award, "A Pat on the Back."

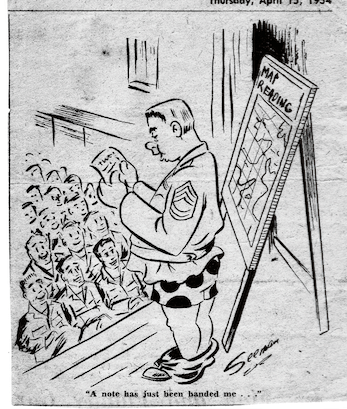
Circa 1953, The Corporal Seeman cartoon, captioned "A note has just been handed me."
