= Andrzej Bart =

Polish novelist, screenwriter and film director (born 1951)

- Born: 1951 (age 74–75); Wrocław, Poland
- Occupations: Novelist, screenwriter, film director
- Writing career
- Genre: Literary fiction

Andrzej Bart (Polish: [ˈandʐɛj bart]; born 1951, in Wrocław, Poland) is a Polish novelist, screenwriter and film director. He is called the Polish Thomas Pynchon he prefers "people talk about his books and films but leave him alone".

== Novels ==
=== Rien ne va plus ===
Andrzej Bart devoted his young years to writing a novel Rien ne va plus This epic story of Poland and Poles, seen through a foreigner's eyes, couldn't be published for a long time because of political reasons. Published in 1991, it was immediately awarded the Kościelski Award. Subsequently, three editions of the book were published in Poland.

=== The Travel Bug ===
In Pociąg do podróży, (1999, The Travel Bug), the writer follows two underdogs, a Jew and a German, who are sent back in time to the year 1900 to kill the young Adolf Hitler. Their eccentric travel serves as a pretext to examine the innocence of Europe before it experienced two world-wide wars.

=== The Fifth Rider of Apocalypse ===
Under the pseudonym Paul Scarron Jr., he published the metaphysical mystery novel Piąty jeździec Apokalipsy (1999, The Fifth Rider of Apocalypse).

=== Don Juan Revisited ===
In the novel Don Juan raz jeszcze (2006, Don Juan Revisited) the old Don Juan atones in a monastery for the sins of his youth. Forced, he sets off for his last adventure. He is to seduce Queen of Castile, Juana, who is traversing Spain with the corpse of her husband.

=== The Flytrap Factory ===
Bart's most translated book is Fabryka Muchołapek (2008, The Flytrap Factory), short listed for the Nike Literary Award. It is a novel about the most controversial figure of modern history, Chaim Rumkowski, the leader of the Łódź Ghetto.

=== Reverse ===
In Rewers (2009, Reverse) Bart brings back to life one of his characters who in Rien ne va plus committed suicide. A young girl who in Stalinism Poland found herself in a no-choice situation, this time is able to confront evil and win.

=== Breathless ===
A famous Polish director, who has been working for the last twenty years in the United States, is in a car accident. Suspended between life and death, he returns, delirious, to his country to do what we all hope we will have time to do. He wants to apologize and to express thanks but he also wants to take revenge.).

=== The Dybbuk Presumed ===
An unexpected guest visits Andrzej Bart, and he announces that he chose him as the confidant of his life story. The author's private notes intertwine with a fascinating story about pre-war Warsaw, the German occupation, and life in the ghetto.

=== The loud death, the silent death ===
In a few months, Adolf Hitler will parade along Piotrkowska Street. Meanwhile, another would-be artist murders young women, and for a better effect, he tosses wrapped body parts in select places. The German V column is also already operating in the city. These are the last moments of Łódź, which, as Israel Joshua Singer said, reflected the whole world.

== Films ==
=== Reverse ===
In 2009, Reverse was awarded the main prize – the Golden Lions Award – at the most prestigious Polish Film Festival in Gdynia. It was submitted to the Academy Awards. Since then Reverse has been receiving numerous awards at many international film festivals including Best New Director at the 36th Seattle International Film Festival and the Best Debut Feature at the 32nd Moscow International Film Festival.

=== Documentaries, TV movies and radio plays ===
Bart made several documentaries including Eva R., about daughter of pianist Arthur Rubinstein, Hiob, about Marek Rudnicki, graphic artist and painter, Marian Brandys about Marian Brandys, a Polish writer. He is also a screenwriter and producer of Radegast. In 2010, he wrote and directed a TV movie, Boulevard Voltaire, awarded at the 2011, Sopot Festival the Best Director and the Best Script. In 2011 he wrote and directed a radio play Pan i sługa / Master and Servant, broadcast 20 November 2011 on Polskie Radio Program I. In 2012, he wrote and directed a radio play Bezdech / Breathless, broadcast 6 May 2012 on Polskie Radio Program I. In 2013 he wrote and directed Bezdech as a TV theater play; for this play he was awarded at the 2013 Sopot Festival Dwa Teatry the Best Original or Adapted Script. Bezdech received four awards, including the Best Actor, the Best Film Editing, and two honorable mentions. It also received "Bronze Knight" at XXIV International Film Forum "Golden Knight", Sevastopol, 2015 Diploma for the Best Director and Diploma for the Best Screenplay

In 2015 he wrote and directed a radio play Owacja na stojąco (Standing Ovation) which was broadcast at the Theater Scene of Radio Station 3, and Miejsce Obok (Beside) aired on 28 February 2016 on Polskie Radio Program I A collection of Andrzej Bart's plays Sztuki i sztuczki (Plays and playings) was published by Narodowe Centrum Kultury, 2015.

In 2016, Andrzej Bart directed a performance reading of his The Flytrap Factory at the Jewish Community Center in Warsaw.

== Bibliography ==
=== Fiction in Polish ===
- Człowiek, na którego nie szczekały psy, Wydawnictwo Łódzkie, 1983.
- Rien ne va plus, Poprzeczna Oficyna, 1991.
- Rien ne va plus, Wydawnictwo Literackie, 2005.
- Rien ne va plus, W.A.B. 2010.
- Pociąg do podróży, Les Editions Noir Sur Blanc, 1999.
- Piąty jeździec Apokalipsy, Les Editions Noir Sur Blanc, 1999.
- Don Juan raz jeszcze, Wydawnictwo Literackie, 2006.
- Rewers, W.A.B., 2009.
- Fabryka muchołapek, W.A.B., 2008.
- Bezdech, W.A.B., 2013.

=== Translations ===
- Rien ne va plus, Les Editions Noir Sur Blanc, 1993, France. Transl. Élisabeth Destrée-Van Wilder.
- Rien ne va plus, Europa, 2005, Hungary. Transl. Lajos Palfalfi.
- Le goût du voyage, Les Editions Noir Sur Blanc, 1999, France. Transl. Éric Morin-Aguilar.
- Le cinquième cavalier de l'Apocalypse, Les Editions Noir Sur Blanc, 1999, France. Transl. Grażyna Erhard.
- Don Juan, une fois encore, Les Editions Noir Sur Blanc, 2009, France. Transl. Robert Bourgeois.
- Die Fliegenfängerfabrik, Schöffling & Co. 2011 Germany. Transl. Albrecht Lempp.
- Фабрика мухобоек, Gesharim, 2010, Russia. Transl. Ksenia Starosielska.
- Tovarna Muholovk, Babilon Maribor 2010, Slovenian. Transl. Jasmina Šuler Galos.
- Továrna na mucholapky, Fra, Praha 2011, Czech. Transl. Jiri Cervenka.
- The Flytrap Factory, Kinneret Zmora-Bitan, Israel 2011. Transl. Anat Zajdman.
- Knochenpalast, Schöffling & Co. 2014 Germany. Transl. Albrecht Lempp.

=== Published plays ===
- Sztuki i sztuczki, Narodowe Centrum Kultury, 2015.

== Filmography ==
- Marian Brandys (documentary, 1997, 19')
- Eva R. (documentary,1998, 19')
- Cafe Mocca (documentary,1998, 19')
- Pałac (documentary, The Castle, 1998, 19')
- Andrzej Czeczot (documentary,1998, 20')
- Hiob (documentary, 2000, 20')
- Andrzej Braun (documentary,2000,19')
- Powinność (documentary, Duty, 2001, 26')
- Maestro (documentary,2001, 26')
- Radegast (writer, producer, documentary, 2009, 50')
- The Reverse (writer, feature, 2009, 96')
- Boulevard Voltaire (writer, director, TV film, 2011, 72')
- Bezdech (feature, 2013, 75 min) (writer, director)

== Awards ==
- 1991 Kościelski Award
- 2010 Golden Duck Award of Film magazine Best Screenwriter 2009–2010 for Reverse
- 2010 Eagle Award, Best Screenplay for Reverse
- 2010 Annual Award of the Ministry of Culture and National Heritage
- 2010 Polish TV Award TeleSplendor for Boulevard Voltaire
- 2011 Sopot Festival the Best Director and the Best Script for Boulevard Voltaire
- 2012 Annual Samuel Linde Award.
- 2013 Sopot Festival Dwa Teatry the Best Original and Adopted Script for Bezdech/Breathless
- II Festival Brasil de Cinema Internacional, Actor in a Leading Role in Breathless: Bogusław Linda.
- XXIV International Film Forum "Golden Knight", Sevastopol, 2015. "Bronze Knight" for Breathless, Diploma for the Best Director and for the Best Screenplay
