= Deus faber =

Concept of God as a craftsman

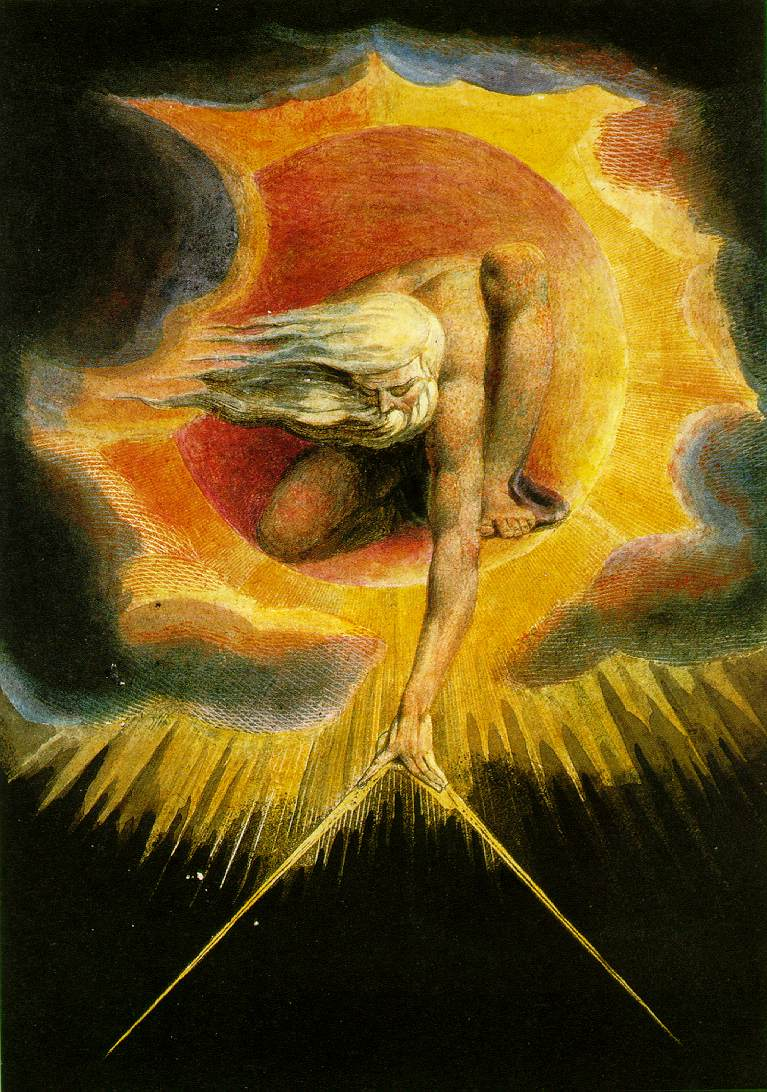
The Ancient of Days, William Blake

Deus faber is the concept of God as a craftsman or an engraver. Deus faber is related to the concept of homo faber.

Deus faber is also related to deus ludens, another portrayal of God as "playful". The belief of a deus faber God states that God created the world like a potter.

== See also ==
- Deus
