= Deus ludens =

Deus ludens is the concept of a playful God, and/or is happy and joyful. Deus ludens is related to deus faber, the concept of God as a craftsman or an engraver.

In the Bible, God is portrayed as "playful" in one verse, which is used as evidence by supporters of a deus ludens God. In Proverbs 8:30, God plays with wisdom.

== See also ==
- Deus
