= Atlanta International Film Festival =

The Atlanta International Film Festival was held in Atlanta from 1968 to 1974. It was backed by the city's businessmen and organized by J. Hunter Todd, who later ran the Worldfest-Houston International Film Festival. It went out of business due to financing. The largest donor was in real estate, and when the city's real-estate market crashed, he went bankrupt and was unable to continue sponsoring the event.

The awards for the festival were trophies, with large birds on the top and included the "Golden Phoenix award" and "Silver Phoenix award". A new film festival with the name Atlanta Film Festival replaced the defunct event in 1976.

== Award recipients ==
- Jim Morrison
- Steven Spielberg
- Eduardo Cemano
