= Reverse (2009 film) =

Polish comedy-drama film

- Rewers
- Directed by: Borys Lankosz
- Written by: Andrzej Bart
- Produced by: Jerzy Kapuściński
- Starring: Agata Buzek; Krystyna Janda; Anna Polony; Marcin Dorociński; Adam Woronowicz; Bronisław Wrocławski
- Cinematography: Marcin Koszałka
- Edited by: Wojciech Anuszczyk
- Music by: Włodzimierz Pawlik
- Production company: Studio Filmowe Kadr
- Release date: 13 November 2009
- Running time: 96 minutes
- Country: Poland
- Language: Polish
- Box office: $ 2 285 368

Reverse (original title: Rewers) is a 2009 Polish comedy-drama film, directed by Borys Lankosz.

== Plot ==
This film is set in Warsaw in the 1950s, with a few flash-forwards to present-day Warsaw. The main character is Sabina, a quiet, shy woman who has just turned thirty, and lives with her mother and ailing grandmother. Sabina lacks a man in her life, and her mother tries hard to find a husband for her. The grandmother, an eccentric lady with a sharp tongue from whom no secret can be concealed, also gets involved. Successive admirers arrive at their small, but tasteful apartment in an antebellum house, but Sabina shows no interest in any of them.

One night, appearing out of nowhere, comes the charming, intelligent, and good-looking Bronislaw. Bronislaw is apparently interested in Sabina, and courts her, and Sabina falls hopelessly in love with him. But when Bronislaw reveals that he is a member of the secret police, and wants Sabina to spy on her boss at the state-run publishing house, things go from bad to worse to macabre. Sabina, her mother and her grandmother are fortunately up to the challenge, revealing a darker side to their otherwise affable personalities.

== Cast ==
- Agata Buzek as Sabina
- Krystyna Janda as Sabina's mother
- Anna Polony as Sabina's grandmother
- Marcin Dorociński as Bronisław
- Łukasz Konopka as Arkadiusz
- Adam Woronowicz as Mr Józef
- Bronisław Wrocławski as Director Barski
- Błażej Wójcik as Marcel
- Jacek Poniedziałek as a dignitary

== Reception ==
Soon after its premiere, it became evident that the film about Stalinist Poland (now a subject of research of film theorists as well as sociologists), was to become a box office hit, which in the Polish domestic market effectively competes with the biggest Hollywood hits such as Twilight Saga or 2012.

Pre-premiere screenings of Reverse at the oldest Warsaw cinema Wisła became the site of meetings of the Polish intelligentsia and “high society", renewing a forgotten Polish tradition of spontaneous post-screening meetings and film discussions.

In conjunction with an Oscar promotional campaign, Reverse was shown in New York City at MOMA and the Directors Guild of America Theatre.

Reverse was also well received by American film critics as evidenced by reviews which appeared in Variety and The Hollywood Reporter.

The Polish Film Academy nominated Reverse for the Polish Film Awards: Eagles in 13 categories, eventually winning awards in eight of those, among them the Best Film Award. Reverse set a new record for the number of awards granted, surpassing the previous record held by Roman Polanski's The Pianist.

Soon thereafter, awards began to appear on the international arena. Reverse received FIPRESCI Award at the Warsaw Film Festival; the St. George Award at the Moscow International Film Festival; as well as the Grand Jury Prize for Best New Director at the Seattle International Film Festival. The decision of the latter award was articulated by the jury as follows: “Borys Lankosz’s Reverse succeeds its substantial ambition to tell the story of love, family, and loyalty in a brutal post war Warsaw. Uniquely, first time director Lankosz manages to deliver a highly stylized vision without sacrificing character, story, or performance. We are happy and honored to give the best new director award to this touching, thrilling, and deeply human film.”

== Awards ==
The film won five awards at the 2009 Polish Film Festival.

Golden Lion

- Best film (Borys Lankosz)
- Producer of the best film (Jerzy Kapuściński)

Individual awards

- Best actress (Agata Buzek)
- Best cinematography (Marcin Koszałka)
- Best music (Włodzimierz Pawlik)
- Best supporting Actor (Marcin Dorociński)
- Best makeup (Mirosława Wojtczak, Ludmiła Krawczyk, Waldemar Pokromski)

It also won the FIPRESCI award at the Warsaw Film Festival for the best Eastern European debut.

- 2010 Eagle Award, Best Screenplay (Andrzej Bart)
