= William H. Luden =

American businessman (1859–1949)

- Born: William Henry Luden; March 5, 1859; Reading, Pennsylvania, U.S.
- Died: May 8, 1949 (aged 90); Atlantic City, New Jersey, U.S.
- Burial place: West Laurel Hill Cemetery, Bala Cynwyd, Pennsylvania, U.S.
- Occupation: Businessman
- Known for: Developed the menthol throat lozenge and founded the Luden's brand and company

William Henry Luden (March 5, 1859 – May 8, 1949) was an American businessman who developed the menthol throat lozenge and founded the Luden's brand and company.

== Early life ==
Luden was born March 5, 1859, in Reading, Pennsylvania, to Jacob and Sarah Luden.

== Career ==
Luden left school at age 15 to work as an apprentice candymaker at Color & Barrett. After five years as an apprentice, he began his own business making "moshie", a Pennsylvania Dutch hard candy made with brown sugar and molasses, in his mother's kitchen.

Early 1900's packaging for Luden's Menthol Cough Drops

In 1881, Luden collaborated with a pharmacist to develop a menthol throat lozenge. He differentiated his cough drops with amber coloring which was different from the typical red cough drops sold at the time.

Menthol cough drops replaced the cumbersome vials of menthol that people with colds had carried to relieve their symptoms. He had retailers display his cough drops rather than the door to door sales tactics used at the time. Luden introduced new packaging methods, using wax paper to line the boxes in order to extend shelf life. He gave samples to railroad workers, who spread awareness of the product along railroad networks in an early example of word-of-mouth advertising.

In 1882, he moved his operations to 37 N. 5th St., and offered an extensive line, including cough drops, hard and soft candies, chocolates and marshmallow products. Luden manufactured his own chocolate for his candies unlike many confectioners of the time. He expanded his operations to a four-story building at Sixth and Washington streets in Reading and had approximately 150 employees. In 1923, he built a four-story factory on North Eighth and Walnut Street and had over 850 employees.

In 1890, Luden was involved in the creation of the Schuykill Valley Bank and served as director. In 1904, through his patronage, the Reading Natatorium was built in Reading to foster basketball programs.

In January 1928, Luden sold the company to Daniel W. Dietrich for 6.5 million dollars and retired. The Luden's brand has subsequently transferred ownership several times.

He was a member of the National Confectioners Association and the Reading Board of Trade.

Luden died May 8, 1949, of a heart attack in Atlantic City, New Jersey. He was interred at West Laurel Hill Cemetery in Bala Cynwyd, Pennsylvania.

== Personal life ==
Luden was married in 1889 to Annie Ritter and together they had eight children. After his first wife died, he was married a second time to Kathryn Faisig in 1916, and together they had two children.
