= Luden's =

American brand of cough drop

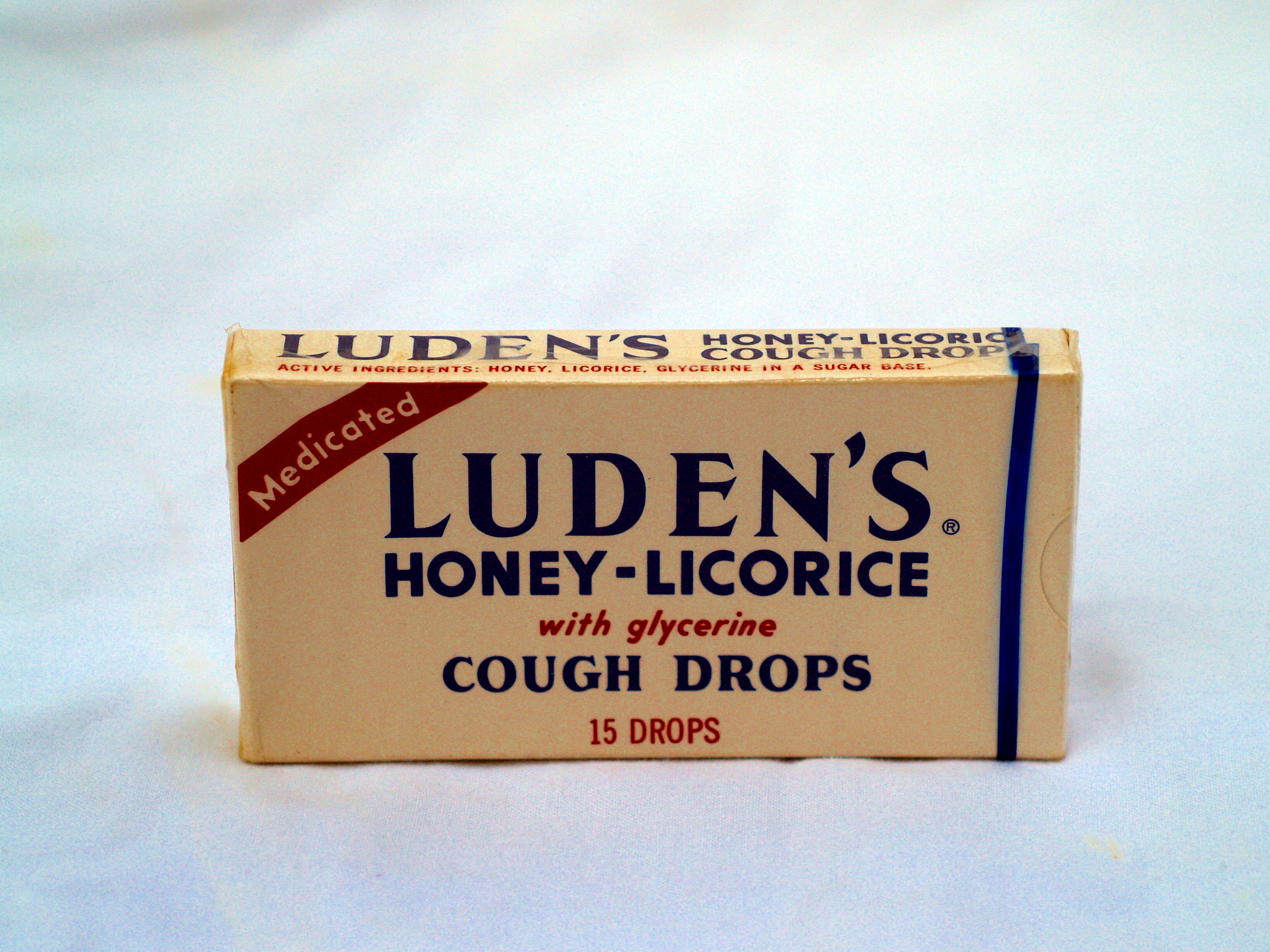
Luden's Honey-Licorice Cough Drops

Luden's is an American brand of cough drop that is currently manufactured and sold in the US by Prestige Consumer Healthcare. Company headquarters are in Tarrytown, New York. Luden's products cycle is based on consumer demand, but their most popular flavors include Wild Cherry, Sugar-Free Wild Cherry, Watermelon, Honey Licorice, Wild Berry, Honey Lemon, and Wild Honey. Other flavors in rotation include Blue Raspberry, Kiwi-Strawberry, Orange, and Original Menthol.

== History ==
William H. Luden created the Luden's brand in 1879. Early products included cough drops and candy. Luden gave samples of his cough drops to railroad workers, giving the product national exposure in an early example of guerrilla marketing.

Luden's was acquired in 1928 by Food Industries of Philadelphia, a holding company owned by the Dietrich family. During its heyday under Dietrich ownership, Luden's produced more than 500 varieties of candy in addition to its better-known cough drops and employed more than 1,200 people. In 1967 filmmaker Ed Seeman hired musician Frank Zappa to collaborate on a Luden's television commercial. Zappa's music was matched with Seeman's animation and the advertisement won a Clio award for "Best Use of Sound". In 1980 the company acquired Queen Anne Candy Co., based in Hammond, Indiana.

The Dietrich family sold Luden's Inc. to Hershey Foods Corp in 1986, resulting in the termination of 98 salaried and 350 hourly workers. Luden's Throat Drops brand was sold by Hershey's to Pharmacia in 2001. In 2003, Pharmacia was acquired by Pfizer. In 2006, Pfizer sold its consumer products division, including the Luden's line, to Johnson & Johnson.

As of 2008, packages of Luden's throat drops displayed the slogan "Trusted Luden's Care – Everyone needs a little TLC".

In November 2009 Charlesbank Capital Partners/Blacksmith Brands announced that it had completed its acquisition of Luden's over-the-counter consumer products brands from McNeil-PPC, Inc.

In late 2010, Prestige Brands acquired Blacksmith Brands.

== Ingredients ==
Luden's brand throat drops are demulcents (meaning an irritation reliever) and some Luden's, such as their Menthol and Honey, offer a mild oral anesthetics. The active ingredient in fruit flavors is pectin, a soluble gelatinous polysaccharide found in ripe fruits. Pectin places a coating on the throat to reduce irritation and swelling. Original Menthol and the various Honey flavors contain menthol, an oral anesthetic and irritant reliever.

The drops' inactive ingredients include FD&C blue No. 1, FD&C blue 2, FD&C red 40, ascorbic acid, citric acid, malic acid, sodium acetate, sodium chloride, caramel color, corn syrup, flavors, soybean oil used as a processing aid, sucrose, and water.
