= List of Chinese films of 1990 =

A list of mainland Chinese films released in 1990. There were 134 Chinese films produced in China in 1990.

Title	Director	Cast	Genre	Notes
The Big Mill	Wu Ziniu	Tao Zeru	Drama	
Black Snow	Xie Fei	Jiang Wen	Drama	Won the Silver Bear at Berlin
Bumming in Beijing: The Last Dreamers	Wu Wenguang		Documentary	
Jiao Yulu	Wang Jixing	Li Xuejian	Biographical	1990 Golden Rooster for Best Film
Ju Dou	Zhang Yimou, Yang Fengliang	Gong Li	Tragedy	First Chinese film nominated for an Academy Award, entered at Cannes
Mama	Zhang Yuan	Qin Yan	Drama	Zhang Yuan's directorial debut
The Wedding Maidens	Jin Wang			Entered into the 17th Moscow International Film Festival
