= The Summer of Miss Forbes =

- Theatrical release poster
- Directed by: Jaime Humberto Hermosillo
- Screenplay by: Gabriel García Márquez; Jaime Humberto Hermosillo
- Based on: Miss Forbes's Summer of Happiness by Gabriel García Márquez
- Produced by: Evelio Delgado
- Starring: Hanna Schygulla; Francisco Gattorno
- Cinematography: Rodrigo García
- Edited by: Nelson Rodríguez
- Music by: Sergio Vitier
- Production companies: Televisión Española S.A; International Network Group
- Distributed by: Macondo Cine Video S.A. de C.V.
- Release date: 15 August 1988
- Running time: 90 minutes
- Country: Germany
- Languages: Spanish; German

The Summer of Miss Forbes (Spanish: El verano de la señora Forbes) is a 1988 Mexican film directed by Jaime Humberto Hermosillo, starring Hanna Schygulla and Francisco Gattorno. It is based on a short story written by Colombian novelist Gabriel García Márquez in 1976 and published in 1992 as part of his collection of short stories titled Doce Cuentos Peregrinos (Strange Pilgrims).

The plot follows the title character, a German governess hired to look after two unruly boys whose parents have taken a six-week vacation. By day, Miss Forbes runs the household with oppressive discipline but at night she displays a behavior more troubling than the one shown by the children who resist her authority.

== Plot ==
Eduardo and his wife are a well to do couple staying in a summer seaside house in Yucatan. They are spending part of the summer months there with their two unruly children: Mauricio and Sandro who are nine and eight years old. The household is completed with the superstitious indigenous cook and a local young fisherman who serves as the children underwater swimming instructor.

As the couple leaves for six weeks to take a cruise from Miami, the mother hires Mrs. Forbes, a German governess, to take care of the children while the parents are away. Mrs. Forbes arrives by boat after a long trip and she is immediately instructed by the mother to impose "law and order" in the house and to treat the undisciplined and rude children severely in an attempt to improve their ways.

Once in charge, Mrs. Forbes treats the children with formality, displaying an authoritarian and repressive temperament. She subjects the children to iron discipline, fueling a deaf resentment in them. Mauricio, the oldest brother, is more pliable, but Bruno, the youngest takes more time to follow Mrs. Forbes commands. Spying on her at night, the brothers discover that she walks around the house drinking alcohol, eating sweets, and reading loud strange passages in German.

From her arrival, Mrs. Forbes is smitten with Aquiles, the hunky young scuba instructor who spends a great deal of time around the house playing with the children and at sea with them while wearing very little. Eating up by a burning desire for Aquiles, Mrs. Forbes sets her eyes on seducing him. She tells him the mythological story of the impossible love between his namesake, the Greek warrior Achilles, and Penthesilea, Queen of the Amazons, who loved each other in spite of being enemies. Although well put together, Mrs. Forbes is at least 15 years his senior, and Achilles is repelled by her advances. Only after much insistence, Aquiles accepts her invitation to go to town for drinks one night. There, she opens up to him. She strips her soul and exposes her true self. She hates order and restraint and rather would like to be free, drink, live a love. She actually does not believe in what she has been imposing on the children. Aquiles remains indifferent. It is Achilles who hides a secret. He is always reluctant to anyone, even the children who are close to him, to go near his seaside rustic cabin. The following night, Mrs. Forbes plunges into the ocean and arrives swimming to Aquiles's house. She enters secretly only to find Aquiles naked in the company of a male lover. Before leaving undiscovered, Mrs. Forbes sets the house on fire with the two men inside.

By the next morning over breakfast, Mrs. Forbes receives a letter that shakes her, but its content remains unrevealed. Afterward, when she gives the orders of the day to the children they have had enough of her and disobey. Reaching her breaking point, Mrs. Forbes also gives in to them. They can do whatever they want. All along since Miss Forbes forced the two boys to eat moray, the same fish that they were terrified of when it was nailed to the door of the house, the children have planned to kill her poisoning her tequila. The idea came from Sandro, the more resolute of the two boys. Mauricio warns him that they could end up on the electric chair, but Sandro is determined. First, there is no electric chair in Mexico and secondly, he would make sure nobody would find out. The brothers poison the tequila and the next morning, waking up late and not seeing Mrs. Forbers around, they believe that their plan has been a success. The children cheerfully celebrate their regained freedom going scuba diving on their own. At their return, the beach house is in turmoil. Mrs. Forbers has been killed, stabbed many times. Mauricio and Sandro manage to avoid the police who guard the crime scene and enter the governess's bedroom. They see her lying dead surrounded by blood with multiple stabs and cuts instead of the poisoned tequila the boys planned her to drink. In death, Mrs. Forbes face has an expression of unsettling serenity. She seems to be happy at last.

== Cast ==
- Hanna Schygulla as Miss Forbes
- Francisco Gattorno as Aquiles
- Alexis Castanares as Sandro
- Víctor César Villalobos as Mauricio
- Guadalupe Sandoval as the mother
- Fernando Balzaretti as Eduardo, the father
- Yuriria Munguía as Mena Victoria, the cook
- Roberto Perdomo as Mulato
- Alejandro Herrero as the drowning wandering

== Production ==
The Summer of Miss Forbes was one part of a series of six films, co-produced by Spanish TV and born out of Colombian novelist Gabriel García Márquez's interest in cinema. García Márquez wrote the outlines of the scripts and the making of them was given to directors from Ibero-America. The films were grouped under the name Amores Dificiles (Difficult Loves) (1987/88) and are formed by:Milagro en Roma (Colombia, directed by Lisandro Duque Naranjo, Yo soy el que tú buscas (Spain, directed by Jaime Chávarri; Un domingo feliz (Venezuela, directed by Olegario Becerra); Cartas del parque (Cuba, directed by Tomás Gutiérrez Alea); Fábula de la bella palomera (Brasil, directed by Ruy Guerra); and the Mexican film, El verano de la señora Forbes directed by Jaime Humberto Hermosillo). The films were intended for television, but shot in 35 millimeters so that they could have a theatrical release.

The Summer of Miss Forbes was a film adaptation of El verano feliz de la señora Forbes, (Miss Forbes's Summer of Happiness), a short story written by Colombian novelist Gabriel García Márquez in 1976 and published in 1992 as part of his collection of short stories titled Doce Cuentos Peregrinos (Strange Pilgrims). The focus of the short story and the film are dissimilar. While the original short story takes the point of view of the narrator, one of the boys, the film centers on the governess and the apparent duality of her personality. The character of Aquiles, the handsome fisherman, was further developed and took an important role in the film as the love interest of Mrs. Forbes. In the original tale, which takes place in Italy instead of Yucatan, Achilles was named Orestes. The change of name allowed to introduce the parallel story of the Greek hero and Penthisela as narrated by Mrs. Forbes. The reasons behind Mrs Forbes assassination remain unexplained in the short story while the film shows an underwater dream-like sequence in which Aquiles, who was seen throughout the film with a knife attached to one of his legs, uses it to stab the governess.
