= Moscow International Film Festival =

Annual film festival

Coordinates: 55.750556°N 37.6175°E

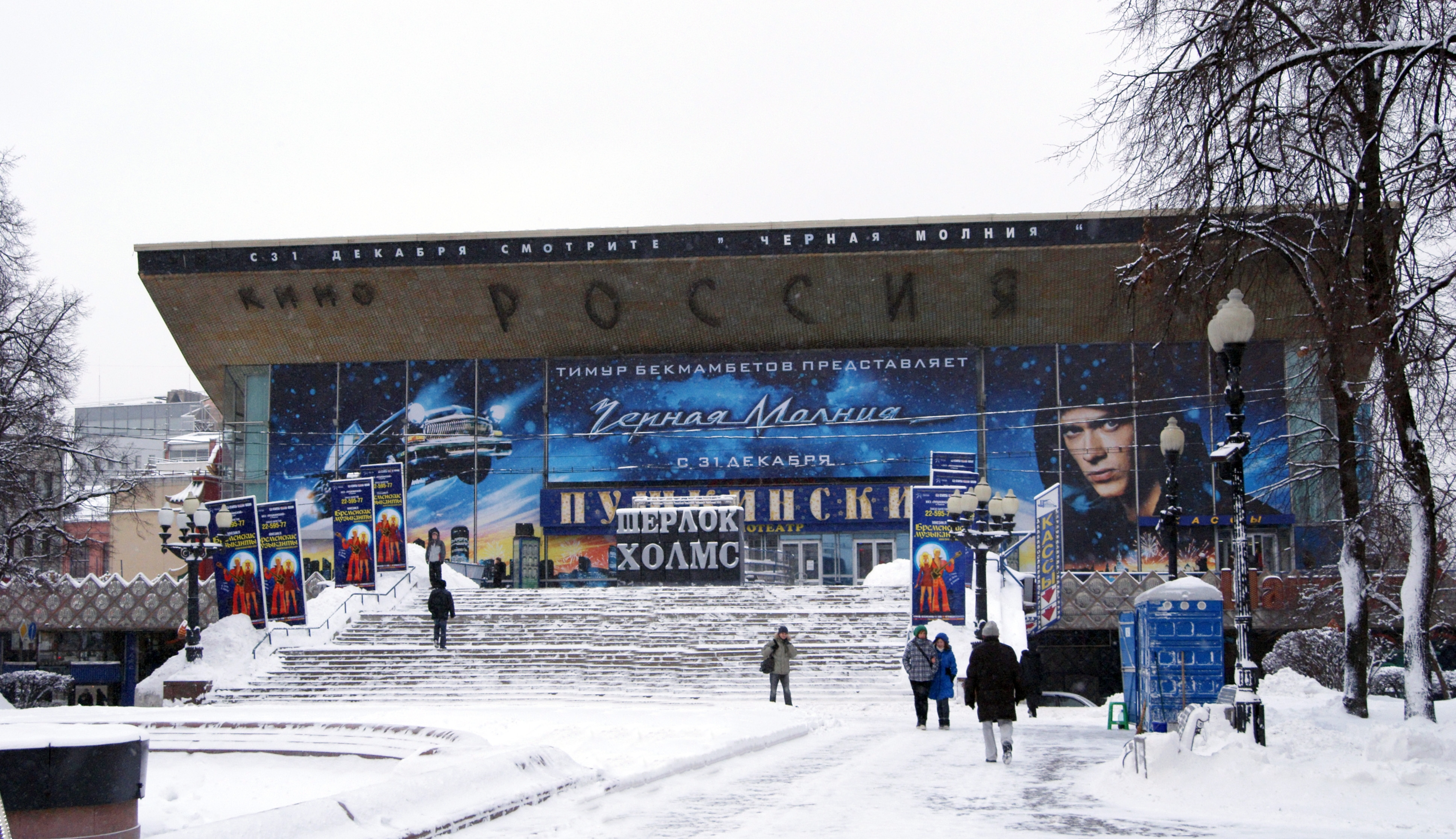
The Rossiya Cinema Theatre has always hosted the Moscow International Film Festival.

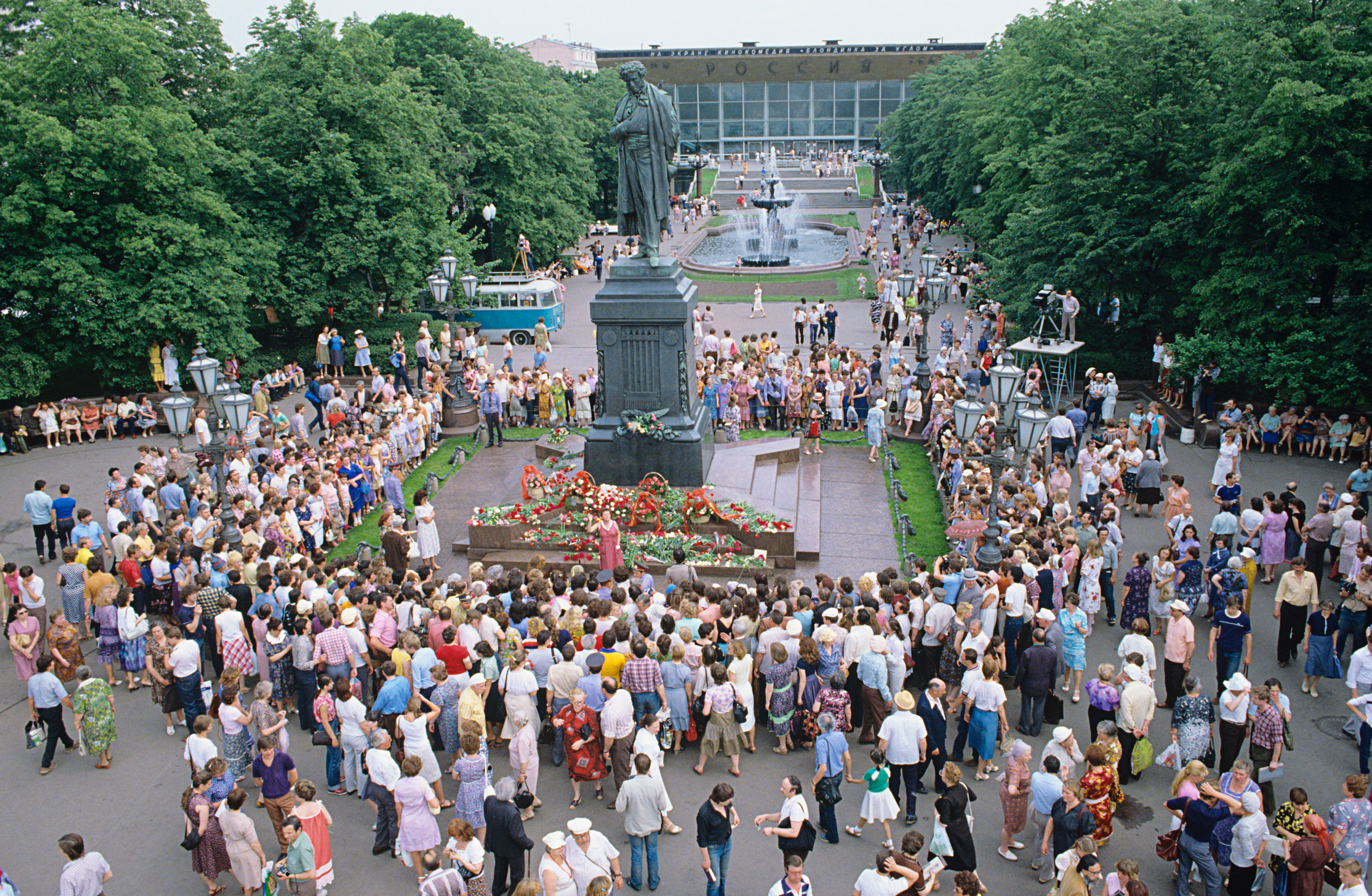
Pushkinskaya Square, Pushkin Monument and Rossiya Cinema Theatre in 1984

The Moscow International Film Festival (Russian: Моско́вский междунаро́дный кинофестива́ль, translit. Moskóvskiy myezhdunaródniy kinofyestivál; abbreviated as MIFF) is a film festival first held in Moscow in 1935 and became regular since 1959. From its inception to 1959, it was held every second year in July, alternating with the Karlovy Vary festival. The festival has been held annually since 1999. In reaction to the 2022 Russian invasion of Ukraine, the FIAPF (Fédération Internationale des Associations de Producteurs de Films, translated as the International Federation of Film Producers Associations) paused the accreditation of the festival until further notice.

The festival's top prize is the statue of Saint George slaying the dragon, as represented on the Coat of Arms of Moscow. Nikita Mikhalkov has been the festival's president since 2000. Over the years, the Stanislavsky Award (with the full title "I Believe. Konstantin Stanislavski") for acting achievements was awarded to Jack Nicholson, Jeanne Moreau, Meryl Streep, Harvey Keitel, Fanny Ardant, Daniel Olbrychski, Gérard Depardieu, Oleg Yankovsky, Isabelle Huppert, Emmanuelle Beart, and Helen Mirren. In 2012, the prize was awarded to French actress Catherine Deneuve.

In 2012 the jury was headed by the Brazilian director Hector Babenco. Among the members of the Jury were prominent filmmakers from different countries: the famous French director and actor Jean-Marc Barr; the Bulgarian director Javor Gardev; Adriana Chiesa di Palma, a producer from Italy; Sergei Loban from Russia. The "Perspectives" Jury was chaired by the filmmaker Marina Razbezhkina (Russia). The program director of the Festival is Kirill Razlogov.

== History ==
In 1997 it was announced that the festival would be held once a year instead of bi-annually. Due to financial problems, the festival was not held in 1998. From 1999 to 2019, Nikita Mikhalkov became the president of the Festival. Since 2006, the documentary program "Free Thought" has appeared in the framework of the Festival. In 2011, it was announced that the competition of documentary films in the MIFF was resumed.

In reaction to the 2022 Russian invasion of Ukraine, the FIAPF (International Federation of Film Producers Associations) paused the accreditation of the Moscow International Film Festival and the Message to Man International Film Festival (held in St Petersburg) until further notice.

== Winners ==
=== Grand Prix (1959–1967) ===
- 1959 – Destiny of a Man (USSR, dir. Sergei Bondarchuk)
- 1961 – The Naked Island (Japan, dir. Kaneto Shindō) and Clear Skies (USSR, dir. Grigori Chukhrai)
- 1963 – 8½ (Italy-France, dir. Federico Fellini)
- 1965 – War and Peace (USSR, dir. Sergei Bondarchuk) and Twenty Hours (Hungary, dir. Zoltán Fábri)
- 1967 – The Journalist (USSR, dir. Sergei Gerasimov) and Father (Hungary, dir. István Szabó)

=== Golden Prize (1969–1987) ===
- 1969 – Lucía (Cuba, dir. Humberto Solás)

Serafino (Italy-France, dir. Pietro Germi)
We'll Live Till Monday (USSR, dir. Stanislav Rostotsky)

- 1971 – Confessions of a Police Captain (Italy, dir. Damiano Damiani)

Live Today, Die Tomorrow! (Japan, dir. Kaneto Shindō)
The White Bird Marked with Black (USSR, dir. Yuri Ilyenko)

- 1973 – That Sweet Word: Liberty! (USSR, dir. Vytautas Žalakevičius)

Affection (Bulgaria, dir. Ludmil Staikov)

- 1975 – The Promised Land (Poland, dir. Andrzej Wajda)

Dersu Uzala (USSR-Japan, dir. Akira Kurosawa)
We All Loved Each Other So Much (Italy, dir. Ettore Scola)

- 1977 – The Fifth Seal (Hungary, dir. Zoltán Fábri)

El puente (Spain, dir. Juan Antonio Bardem)
Mimino (USSR, dir. Georgi Daneliya)

- 1979 – Christ Stopped at Eboli (Italy-France, dir. Francesco Rosi)

Siete días de enero (Spain-France, dir. Juan Antonio Bardem)
Camera Buff (Poland, dir. Krzysztof Kieślowski)

- 1981 – O Homem que Virou Suco (Brazil, dir. João Batista de Andrade)

The Abandoned Field: Free Fire Zone (Vietnam, dir. Nguyen Hong Sen)
Teheran 43 (USSR-France-Switzerland, dir. Aleksandr Alov, Vladimir Naumov)

- 1983 – Amok (Morocco-Guinea-Senegal, dir. Souheil Ben-Barka)

Alsino and the Condor (Nicaragua-Cuba-Mexico-Costa Rica, dir. Miguel Littín)
Vassa (USSR, dir. Gleb Panfilov)

- 1985 – Come and See (USSR, dir. Elem Klimov)

A Soldier's Story (USA, dir. Norman Jewison)
The Descent of the Nine (Greece, dir. Christos Shopakhas)

- 1987 – Intervista (Italy, dir. Federico Fellini)

=== Golden St. George (1989–2003) ===
- 1989 – The Icicle Thief (Italy, dir. Maurizio Nichetti)
- 1991 – Spotted Dog Running at the Edge of the Sea (USSR-Germany, dir. Karen Gevorkian)
- 1993 – Me Ivan, You Abraham (France-Belarus, dir. Yolande Zauberman)
- 1995 – not awarded
- 1997 – Marvin's Room (USA, dir. Jerry Zaks)
- 1999 – Will to Live (Japan, dir. Kaneto Shindō)
- 2000 – Life as a Fatal Sexually Transmitted Disease (Poland-France, dir. Krzysztof Zanussi)
- 2001 – The Believer (USA, dir. Henry Bean)
- 2002 – Resurrection (Italy-France, dir. Paolo and Vittorio Taviani)
- 2003 – The End of a Mystery (Italy / Spain, dir. Miguel Hermoso)

=== Golden George (2004–2021) ===
- 2004 – Our Own (dir. Dmitry Meskhiev, Russia)
- 2005 – Dreaming of Space (dir. Alexei Uchitel, Russia)
- 2006 – About Sara (dir. Othman Karim, Sweden)
- 2007 – Travelling with Pets (dir. Vera Storozheva, Russia)
- 2008 – As Simple as That (dir. Reza Mirkarimi, Iran)
- 2009 – Pete on the Way to Heaven (dir. Nikolaj Dostal', Russia)
- 2010 – Hermano (dir. Marcel Rasquin, Venezuela)
- 2011 – Las olas (dir. Alberto Morais, Spain)
- 2012 – Junkhearts (dir. Tinge Krishnan, United Kingdom)
- 2013 – Particle (dir. Erdem Tepegöz, Turkey)
- 2014 – My Man (dir. Kazuyoshi Kumakiri, Japan)
- 2015 – Losers (dir. Ivaylo Hristov, Bulgaria)
- 2016 – Daughter (dir. Reza Mirkarimi, Iran)
- 2017 – Yuan Shang (dir. Liang Qiao (director), China)
- 2018 – The Lord Eagle (dir. Eduard Novikov, Russia)
- 2019 – The Secret of a Leader (dir. Farkhat Sharipov, Kazakhstan)
- 2020 – A Siege Diary (dir. Andreï Zaïtsev, Russia)
- 2021 – Dogpoopgirl (dir. Andrei Huțuleac, Romania)

=== Golden Saint George (since 2022) ===
- 2022 – No Prior Appointment (dir. Behrouz Shoeibi, Iran)
- 2023 – Three Brothers (dir. Francisco Joaquín Paparella, Chile & Argentina)
- 2024 – Shame (dir. Miguel Salgado, Mexico and Qatar)
- 2025 – Ha Lyngkha Bneng (dir. Pradip Kurbah, India)

== See also ==
- List of film festivals in Europe#Russia
