= Dona Herlinda and Her Son =

1985 film by Jaime Humberto Hermosillo

- Theatrical release poster
- Directed by: Jaime Humberto Hermosillo
- Screenplay by: Jaime Humberto Hermosillo
- Based on: Doña Herlinda y su hijo by Jorge López Páez.
- Produced by: Manuel Barbachano Ponce
- Starring: Arturo Meza; Marco Treviño; Guadalupe del Toro
- Cinematography: Miguel Ehrenberg
- Edited by: Luis Kelly
- Release date: 18 June 1985
- Running time: 90 minutes
- Country: Mexico
- Language: Spanish

Dona Herlinda and Her Son (Spanish: Doña Herlinda y su hijo) is a 1985 Mexican film directed by Jaime Humberto Hermosillo, starring Arturo Meza, Marco Treviño and Guadalupe del Toro. It was based on the homonymous short story written by Jorge López Páez.

The plot follows Rodolfo, a young bachelor doctor, who has a love affair with a younger music student, Ramón. Rodolfo's meddlesome but well intentioned mother, arranges for Ramón to move with them but also for Rodolfo to find a girlfriend and get married.

Doña Herlinda and her son successfully premiered at various international festivals: the XV Festival New Directors - New Films at the Museum of Modern Art in New York (1986), the XXX London Film Festival (1986), and the Festival of Amiens (France) (1986), among others.

== Plot ==
Ramón, a trim and handsome music student in his twenties, takes classes at the local conservatory in Guadalajara. He lives in a rundown overcrowded boarding house, where he practices on his French horn and gets together with his boyfriend Rodolfo, a thirty-something neurosurgeon with a successful career in pediatric medicine. Their relationship is loving and tender, but in the conservative homophobic society in which they live, their relationship must remain discreetly hidden behind closed doors. Their secret encounters always seem to be interrupted by visitors and phone calls by Rodolfo's meddlesome widower mother, Doña Herlinda.

Doña Herlinda pretends that she knows nothing of the true nature of the relationship between her son and Ramón who she really dotes on like a second child. For the weekend, Doña Herlinda organizes a day trip to lake Chapala with Rodolfo and Ramón, but she has also invited Olga, a young independent woman, as a prospective girlfriend for Rodolfo. Ramón is dismayed and upset. This creates the first tension in the relationship between the two men, but they soon reconcile. Invited for dinner to Rodolfo's house, Doña Herlinda casually suggests to Ramón that he stays over, every night, and moves permanently with them- after all Rodolfo's bedroom is very big and his bed comfortable enough for the two of them. Ramón moves in and now not only Rodolfo is happy but Doña Herlinda and Ramón become even closer friends and companions. The sudden death of an uncle brings a surprise visit to town from Ramón's parents. His severe mother is startled finding his son living in close quarters with Rodolfo, but Doña Herlinda not only welcomes the couple warmly but smoothed things out with them so Ramón's parents depart assured that their son is well-taking care of in spite of his a typical living situation.

Things complicate further when Rodolfo announces to Ramón, that to please his mother, he is about to ask Olga's hand in marriage. Ramón is upset and depressed. He asks Billie, his best friend who studies with him at the conservatory, for advice. Ramón tells her that if he leaves Rodolfo's house he might lose him, but if he stays, he might keep him. Billie is not much of a help as she is dry mouth with Ramón's conundrum. On the day of the engagement, Ramón refuses to go. Instead, he stays at home crying and drinking while listening to torch love songs. Rodolfo assures him that their relationship will go on and that he is not to move as Doña Herlinda, who sincerely loves him, counts on Ramón keep on living with them even after Rodolfo's marriage. Rodolfo gets married and leaves with Olga to their honeymoon in Hawaii while heartbroken Ramon remains behind keeping company to Doña Herlinda who tries to cheer him up and helps him drying his tears.

After the marriage, both men continue their relationship furtively at Doña Herlinda's house. For her part, Olga, an educated and independent woman, wants to continue working and, have a life of her own, far from the traditional role assigned to a Mexican housewife. As soon as she returns from the honeymoon, Olga makes an effort to gain Ramón's friendship. Won over her by her confidences and warm attitude, he finally takes a liking to her. When Olga soon gives birth to a boy, Ramón becomes the proud baby's Godfather. To commemorate the arrival of her grandson, Doña Herlinda announces that she has commissioned to expand the house with a wing for Olga and Rodolfo but also an independent tower for Ramón where Rodolfo can visit him. During the baby's christening celebrations, Rodolfo, who has always liked poetry, recites a poem: How beautiful it would have been to live under that roof, the two always united and loving us both; you always in love, I always satisfied. The two, a single soul, the two, one breast, and in the middle of us: my mother as a god!. The family is united. Doña Herlinda smiles happily satisfied.

== Cast ==
- Arturo Meza as Ramón
- Marco Treviño as Rodolfo
- Guadalupe del Toro as Doña Herlinda
- Leticia Lupercio as Olga
- Guillermina Alba as Billy, Ramón's friend
- Angélica Guerrero as Ramón's mother
- Arturo Villaseñor as Ramón's father
