= Miracle in Rome =

1988 film

Milagro en Roma
- Theatrical release poster
- Directed by: Lisandro Duque Naranjo
- Written by: Lisandro Duque Naranjo
- Based on: The Long Happy Life of Margarito Duarte by Gabriel García Márquez
- Produced by: Santiago Llapur
- Starring: Frank Ramírez; Gerardo Arellano; Amalia Duque García; Santiago García; Lisandro Duque Naranjo; Enrique Buenaventura; Daniel Priolett
- Cinematography: Mario García Joya
- Edited by: Lisandro Duque Naranjo; Gabriel González Meléndez
- Music by: Blas Emilio Atehortúa
- Production companies: Elisa Cinematográfica; International Network Group S.A. Televisión Española (TVE)
- Distributed by: Radio Televisión Española (RTVE)
- Release date: 1988
- Running time: 90 minutes
- Country: Colombia
- Language: Spanish

Milagro en Roma (Miracle in Rome) is a 1988 Colombian film directed by Lisandro Duque Naranjo and based upon The long happy life of Margarito Duarte, a story by the Colombian Nobel Prize-winning novelist Gabriel García Márquez, originally published in 1981. The film follows the story of Margarito Duarte, a man whose daughter died under sudden and inexplicable circumstances. Disinterred years later, her body is discovered in pristine condition, having undergone no apparent decomposition. Unwilling to bury his daughter once again, Margarito struggles with the Vatican to have his daughter canonized as a saint.

== Plot ==
Margarito Duarte is a modest employee of the local court in Filandia, a small Colombian town on the slopes of the Andes. Abandoned by his wife, Margarito is devoted to his only child, Evelia, his seven-year-old daughter. One day, after Evelia's school day is over, Margarito waits for his daughter at home with a present, an acrobatic flipping monkey. Evelia barely has time to give a kiss and hug her father in gratitude for the present when she dies, suddenly, for no apparent reason.

Twelve years later, Margarito visits the cemetery to exhume the remains of his child in order to prevent them from being placed in a mass grave after the parish has decided to construct a new cemetery. Taking the corpse out of its crypt, Margarito is surprised to find Evelia's body intact. She looks as if she had just gone to sleep, although the coffin is rotted all around her. This creates a commotion at the cemetery, where people believe that this is a miracle and that the child might be a saint. The event has such profound effect on the town that the local priest invites the bishop of Armenia to determine the religious nature of what has taken place. The bishop is surprised to see not only that Evelia looks in perfect condition but that the girl's body is even warm. The bishop questions Margarito regarding the girl's religious background and the priest mentions that the toy monkey began to work unexpectedly at the funeral. However, the bishop is skeptical. Not believing there has been a miracle, he orders the girl's body to be buried again. Also, he specifies that the coffin should be watered to help decompose the body. However, now that Margarito has regained his child, he has no intention of committing a crime by drowning her. At the very moment that the bishop is making his visit, a total solar eclipse takes place. For the people of Filandia, there is not doubt. Turning against the bishop and, indirectly supporting Margarito's intentions, the crowd screams that the girl is a saint. All working together, they organize an emergency collection, raising a considerable amount of money in order to send father and daughter off to Rome, "for the Holy Father to decide about the miracle."

In Rome, Margarito is welcomed by the Colombian ambassador and his secretary, who are fully aware of the political advantages to be gained from facilitating the process of verifying the first Colombian saint. The secretary of the ambassador arranges for Margarito to live as the roommate of Antonio, a fellow Colombian and opera singer who is pursuing a career as a soloist tenor. Margarito moves with Antonio, but rejects the help of the embassy as he does not want to politicize his daughter's sainthood process. Alone, sober and dignified, Margarito takes his daughter's case in front of the Vatican ecclesiastic authorities armed with a letter of recommendation and a large lunch box type suitcase in which he carries his daughter everywhere. Margarito does not have much success, as he faces the well intentioned, but bureaucratic Vatican curia, who recommends the embassy route to promote the launching of the beatification process. Things seem not going anywhere until Margarito meets a "bishop" willing to personally help him. However, this bishop turns out to be an impostor who swindles Margarito from most of his money.

Antonio has a singing test that will help him to move forward his opera career. While he sings, the windows are broken apparently by the power of his voice. He is congratulated in a presentation not seen since the time of Caruso. Antonio attributes this event to Margarito, who he considers the true saint, admiring his friend's devotion for his daughter, his dignified attitude and his tenacity. Besieged by the secretary of the Colombian embassy and the Italian mortuary authorities, who want to have the body buried, Margarito pleads with his daughter to wake up. The toy monkey begins to play by itself and Evelia resurrects to Margarito's delight. A father's love has prevailed over the presumptuous eternity of death; a miracle has taken place in Rome.

== Cast ==
- Frank Ramírez as Margarito Duarte
- Gerardo Arellano as Antonio, the tenor
- Amalia Duque García as Evelia
- Santiago García as Bishop of Armenia
- Humberto Dorado as the town's priest
- Lisandro Duque Naranjo as Colombian Embassy's secretary
- Enrique Buenaventura as Cardinal Frances
- Daniel Priolett as the false Bishop

== Production ==
Milagro en Roma was conceived as one of a series of six films born out of Colombian novelist Gabriel García Márquez's interest in Cinema. García Márquez wrote the outlines of the scripts and the making of the films was given to directors from Ibero-America. The films were grouped under the name Amores Dificiles (Tough Loves) and are formed by: Yo soy el que tú buscas (Spain, directed by Jaime Chávarri); El verano de la señora Forbes (México, directed by Jaime Humberto Hermosillo); Un domingo feliz (Venezuela, directed by Olegario Becerra). Cartas del parque (Cuba, directed by Tomás Gutiérrez Alea); Fábula de la bella palomera (Brasil, directed by Ruy Guerra); and the Colombian film, Milagro en Roma.

Milagro en Roma was directed by Lisandro Duque and produced by Spanish TV SA and International Network Group under the auspices of the Foundation of New Latin American Cinema as the other films of the Amores Dificiles series. Gabriel García Márquez had been very favorable impressed by Colombian film director Lisandro Duques after watching his film Visa U.S.A (1986) and, based on this, the famous novelist invited Duque to work with him on the script of Milagro en Roma and to direct the film.

The story of Milagro en Roma was inspired by a newspaper article published by the author in 1981 entitled The long and happy life of Margarito Duarte which recounts a more than twenty years fruitless battle of a humble Colombian man to have his daughter canonized at the Vatican. The film differs greatly from the short article and precedes la Santa (The Saint), a short story written by García Márquez afterwards and published in 1992 as part of his collection of short stories titled Doce Cuentos Peregrinos (Strange Pilgrims).
