= Dogpoopgirl =

#dogpoopgirl
- Directed by: Andrei Huțuleac
- Written by: Andrei Huțuleac
- Produced by: Dan Chișu
- Starring: Andreea Gramosteanu; Coca Bloos; Paul Chiribuță; Tudor Istodor; Cezar Antal
- Cinematography: Constantin Ene Jr.
- Edited by: Alex Pintica
- Production company: DaKINO Production
- Release dates: 25 April 2021 (Moscow International Film Festival); 15 April 2022 (Romania)
- Running time: 79 minutes
- Country: Romania
- Language: Romanian

#dogpoopgirl is a 2021 Romanian comedy-drama film directed by Andrei Huțuleac, starring Andreea Gramosteanu, Coca Bloos, Paul Chiribuță, Tudor Istodor and Cezar Antal. The film is loosely based on South Korean internet case dog poop girl.

A woman's dog poops in a Bucharest subway car. The incident is caught on camera by a teenager who posts it on-line. Chaos ensues.

== Cast ==
- Andreea Gramosteanu as Aline
- Coca Bloos
- Paul Chiribuță
- Tudor Istodor
- Cezar Antal
- Andrei Huțuleac

== Release ==
The film premiered at the Moscow International Film Festival on 25 April 2021, where it won the top award at the festival, the Golden George.

== Reception ==
Ștefan Dobroiu of Cineuropa wrote that the film "efficiently nudges the viewer towards a useful comparison".

Allan Hunter of Screen Daily wrote that the film "gleefully scatters its concerns a little too far and wide", while Gramosteanu "convincingly conveys the bewilderment and exasperation of someone who finds it impossible to convince others that she is not the monster they think."
