= The Bet (1990 film) =

1990 Polish film

- Directed by: Teresa Kotlarczyk
- Written by: Andrzej Dziurawiec
- Starring: Jan Peszek
- Cinematography: Piotr Wojtowicz
- Release date: October 1990
- Running time: 72 minutes
- Country: Poland
- Language: Polish

The Bet (Polish: Zakład) is a 1990 Polish drama film directed by Teresa Kotlarczyk. It was entered into the 17th Moscow International Film Festival.

== Cast ==
- Jan Peszek as Director Wygon
- Grażyna Trela as Reporter Magda
- Pawel Królikowski as Tomek Koziel
- Krzysztof Kolberger as Group Tutor Marek
- Bartłomiej Topa as Andrzej Matlak
- Włodzimierz Musiał as Group Tutor Musial
- Mariusz Bonaszewski as Swir
- Robert Gonera as Mariusz
- Pawel Niczewski as Gigant
- Jaroslaw Gruda as Warchol
- Ryszard Kotys as Guard
