= Dog poop girl =

2005 South Korean doxing incident

Coordinates: 37.556°N 126.941°E

- Hangul: 개똥녀
- Hanja: 개똥女
- Revised Romanization: Gaettongnyeo
- McCune–Reischauer: Kaettongnyŏ

Dog poop girl (Korean: 개똥녀) refers to a 2005 incident in South Korea which was one of the first internationally reported occurrences of doxing. In a Seoul subway car, a young woman's lap dog defecated inside the train, and the woman was photographed on another passenger's mobile phone camera after she did not clean up the mess despite numerous requests. The photos were posted on a popular Korean website and widely distributed; the woman was later identified, and her personal information was published online. The woman was publicly shamed and quit her university. Newspaper editorials then addressed the issues concerning Internet vigilantism and privacy concerns.

== Incident ==
In early June 2005, the woman, who appeared to be in her 20s, took her lap dog on Seoul Subway Line 2. Her dog defecated on the floor of the subway car and, when other riders requested that she clean up after it, she declined to do so. Another subway rider offered the woman a tissue, which she used to clean the dog but not its waste. Other passengers suggested she clean up the mess, she ignored the second group of requests and departed the subway at the next stop. Another female commuter, using a camera phone, took several photographs of the woman and dog and posted them on a popular Korean website.

== Reaction ==
Soon after the unaltered photos were published, Internet vigilante groups closely examined the picture and within days she had been identified and her personal data released on the Internet. The photo quickly became one of the most popular image searches on popular Korean web portals and a source of parody and derisive satire.

The woman quit her university in shame and published a photo of her dog with a public apology.

The 2021 movie #dogpoopgirl is loosely based on this incident.

== Criticism ==
The reaction by Korean Internet users to the incident prompted several Korean newspapers to run editorials voicing concern over Internet vigilantism, suggesting that the effect of worldwide crowds do not result in wise, uniform judgments and appropriate punishments via social stigma. Concerns regarding the implications for personal privacy were raised. Some said that posting the woman's picture was acceptable, but that posting her personal information was inappropriate. Others said that her face should have been obscured in the widely circulated picture, in order to protect her identity.

According to Daniel J. Solove, a professor who specializes in privacy issues at the George Washington University Law School, the case:

[...] involves a norm that most people would seemingly agree to — clean up after your dog [...] But having a permanent record of one's norm violations is upping the sanction to a whole new level ... allowing bloggers to act as a cyber-posse, tracking down norm violators and branding them with digital scarlet letters.

== See also ==
- Guilt–shame–fear spectrum of cultures – Main emotion used for social control
- Human flesh search engine – Chinese term for a form of Internet vigilantism
- List of Internet phenomena
- Online shaming – Form of public shaming
