= Teresa Kotlarczyk =

Polish film director (born 1955)

- Born: 10 October 1955 (age 70); Oświęcim, Poland
- Occupations: Film director, screenwriter
- Years active: 1990-present

Teresa Kotlarczyk (born 10 October 1955) is a Polish film director and screenwriter. Her 1990 film The Bet (Polish: Zakład) was entered into the 17th Moscow International Film Festival.

== Selected filmography ==
- Regina (TV series) (2007)
- Prymas.Trzy lata z tysiąca (2000)
- The Bet (1990)
- Kalejdoskop (Kaleidoscope) (1986)
