= Homework (1991 film) =

1991 film

- Directed by: Jaime Humberto Hermosillo
- Written by: Jaime Humberto Hermosillo
- Starring: José Alonso; María Rojo
- Cinematography: Toni Kuhn
- Release date: 24 May 1991
- Running time: 85 minutes
- Country: Mexico
- Language: Spanish

Homework (Spanish: La tarea) is a 1991 Mexican drama film directed by Jaime Humberto Hermosillo. It was entered into the 17th Moscow International Film Festival where it won a Special Mention. The film was selected as the Mexican entry for the Best Foreign Language Film at the 64th Academy Awards, but was not accepted as a nominee.

== Cast ==
- José Alonso as Marcelo / Pepe
- María Rojo as Virginia / Maria

== See also ==
- List of submissions to the 64th Academy Awards for Best Foreign Language Film
- List of Mexican submissions for the Academy Award for Best Foreign Language Film
