= Jaime Humberto Hermosillo =

Mexican film director (1942–2020)

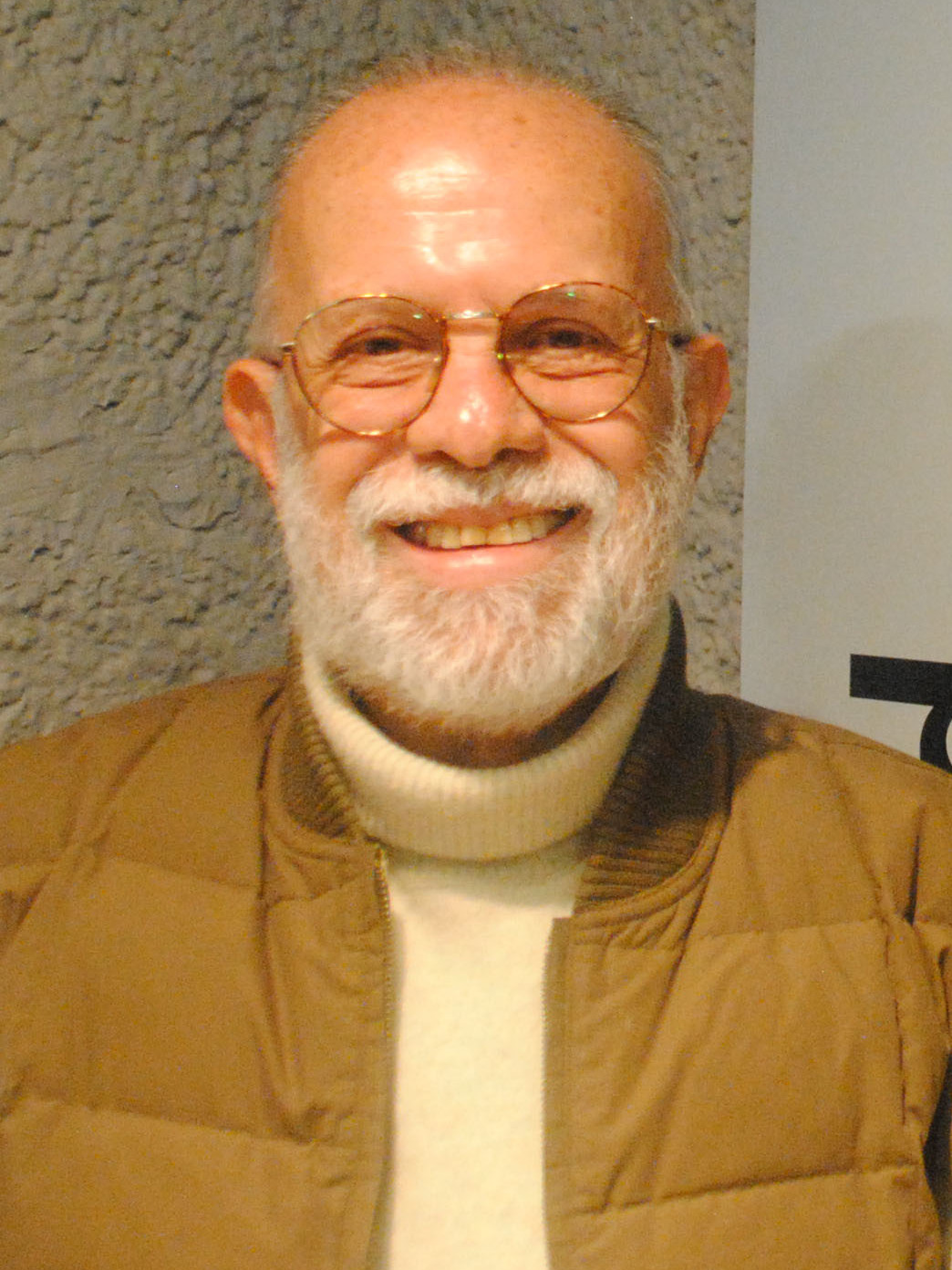
- Hermosillo in 2015
- Born: 22 January 1942; Aguascalientes, Mexico
- Died: 13 January 2020 (aged 77); Guadalajara, Jalisco, Mexico
- Occupations: Film director, screenwriter, university professor
- Years active: 1965–present

Jaime Humberto Hermosillo Delgado (22 January 1942 – 13 January 2020) was a Mexican film director. Born in Aguascalientes, Aguascalientes, in central Mexico, Hermosillo's films often explore the hypocrisy of middle-class Mexican values. He was often compared to Spain's Pedro Almodóvar.

He worked with Gabriel García Márquez on Mary My Dearest (1979) and The Summer of Miss Forbes (1988). His film Homework (1991) was entered into the 17th Moscow International Film Festival where it won a Special Mention.

On 13 January 2020, Hermosillo died at the age of 77. At the time of his death he was teaching film-making at the University of Guadalajara and had recently collaborated with his students on several projects.

== Filmography ==
Year	Title	Director	Writer	Editor	Notes
2018	Crimen por Omisión				
2017	Un buen sabor de boca				
2015	InFielicidad				
2010	Juventud				
2005	Amor				
2005	Rencor				
2005	Dos Auroras				
2004	El mal logrado amor de Sebastián				Based on part of the novel Agapi Mu by Luis González de Alba
2004	El misterio de los almendros				
2003	El Edén	Yes	Yes		
2002	eXXXorcismos	Yes	Yes		
2000	Escrito en el cuerpo de la noche				
2000	La calle de las novias	Yes			Telenovela
1997	De noche vienes, Esmeralda	Yes	Yes	Yes	
1996	Danske Piger Viser Alt	Yes			Episode: "Why Don't We?"; Coproduced with Denmark and Canada
1993	Encuentro inesperado	Yes	Yes		
1992	La tarea prohibida	Yes	Yes		
1991	La tarea	Yes	Yes	Yes	
1989	El aprendiz de pornógrafo	Yes	Yes	Yes	Video editor
1989	Intimidades de un cuarto de baño	Yes	Yes		
1989	Un momento de ira	Yes	Yes	Yes	
1988	El verano de la señora Forbes	Yes	Yes		
1987	Clandestino destino	Yes	Yes		
1984	Doña Herlinda y su hijo	Yes	Yes	Yes	
1983	El corazón de la noche	Yes	Yes		
1983	Las apariencias engañan	Yes	Yes		
1982	Confidencias	Yes	Yes		
1979	María de mi corazón	Yes	Yes		
1978	Amor libre (película de 1978)	Yes	Yes		
1978	Idilio	Yes	Yes		
1977	Naufragio	Yes	Yes		
1976	Matinée	Yes	Yes		
1975	Antes del desayuno	Yes	Yes		Unfinished short film
1975	La pasión según Berenice	Yes	Yes		
1974	El cumpleaños del perro	Yes	Yes		
1972	El señor de Osanto	Yes	Yes		
1971	La verdadera vocación de Magdalena	Yes	Yes		
1969	Los nuestros	Yes	Yes		Medium-length film
1969	S. S. Glencairn	Yes	Yes		Short film
1965	Homesick	Yes	Yes		Short film

== Awards and nominations ==
- Medalla Salvador Toscano al Mérito Cinematográfico, 2012

Ariel Awards, Mexico
Year	Category	Work	Result
2003	Best Direction	eXXXorcisms	Nominated
2003	Best Screenplay Written Directly for the Screen	eXXXorcisms	Nominated
2001	Best Screenplay Adapted from Another Source	Escrito en el cuerpo de la noche	Nominated
1998	Best Direction	Esmeralda Comes by Night	Nominated
1998	Best Screenplay	Esmeralda Comes by Night	Nominated
1985	Best Screenplay	Dona Herlinda and Her Son	Nominated
1984	Best Screenplay	Las apariencias engañan	Won
1984	Best Screenplay	El corazón de la noche	Nominated
1979	Best Direction	Amor libre	Nominated
1978	Best Picture	Naufragio	Won
1978	Best Direction	Naufragio	Won
1978	Best Screenplay	Naufragio	Won
1977	Best Picture	The Passion of Berenice	Won
1977	Best Direction	The Passion of Berenice	Won
1977	Best Original Story	The Passion of Berenice	Nominated
1977	Best Screenplay	The Passion of Berenice	Nominated

Ajijic International Film Festival
Year	Award	Result
2001	Tribute Award	Won

Cartagena Film Festival
Year	Award	Title	Result
2002	Best Film	Escrito en el cuerpo de la noche	Nominated

Gramado Film Festival
Year	Award	Title	Result
1998	Best Film	De noche vienes, Esmeralda	Nominated

Guadalajara International Film Festival
Year	Award	Title	Result
1998	Audience Award	De noche vienes, Esmeralda	Won

Havana Film Festival
Year	Award	Title	Result
1992	Grand Coral – First Prize – Documentary	La tarea prohibida	Won

Istanbul Film Festival
Year	Award	Title	Result
1993	Special Prize of the Jury	Tarea	Won

Moscow International Film Festival
Year	Award	Title	Result
1991	Special Mention	Tarea	Won
1991	Golden St. George	Tarea	Nominated

Taormina International Film Festival
Year	Award	Title	Result
1991	Silver Charybdis	Tarea	Won

Valladolid International Film Festival
Year	Award	Title	Result
1991	Special Prize of the Jury	Tarea	Won
