= Jan Peszek =

Polish actor (born 1944)

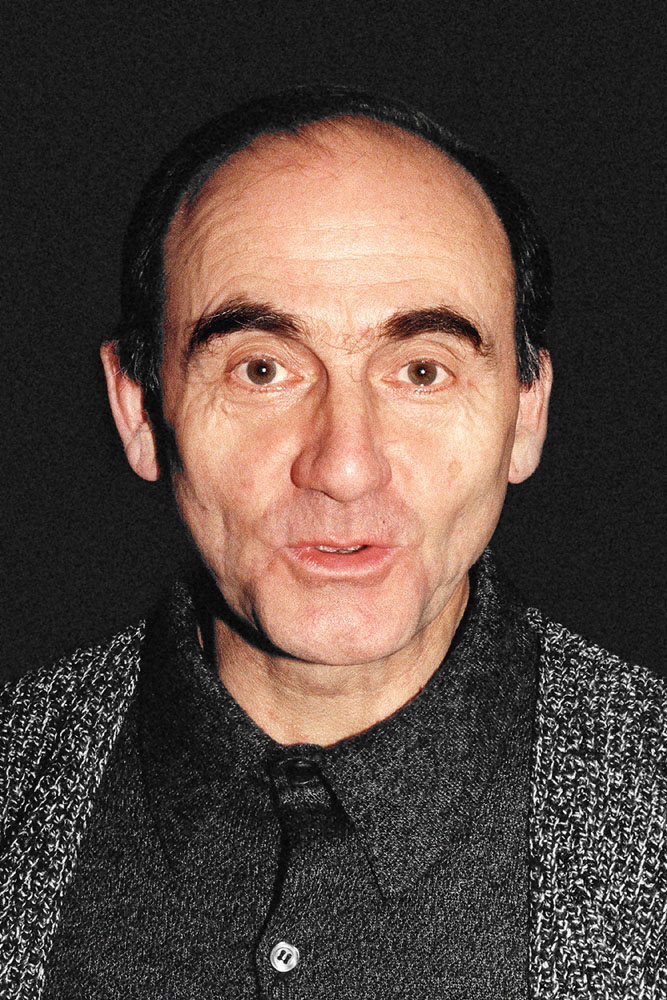
- Born: 13 February 1944 (age 82); Szrensk, Poland
- Occupation: Actor
- Years active: 1966-present
- Spouse: Teresa Peszek (married 1969–present)

Jan Peszek (born 13 February 1944) is a Polish theatre, film, and television actor. Although primarily involved in theatre work, he has appeared in more than sixty films since 1970. He is most well known for his work with dramaturgist Bogusław Schaeffer.

== Biography ==
Peszek was born in Szreńsk. In 1966 he finished his education in the AST National Academy of Theatre Arts in Kraków, and made his debut the same year in Bertolt Brecht's The Resistible Rise of Arturo Ui staged at the Polish Theatre in Wrocław.

In 1969 he got cast in his first film role in Andrzej Piotrowski's Znaki na drodze.

In 2014 he received an award from the city Kraków for outstanding achievements in acting.

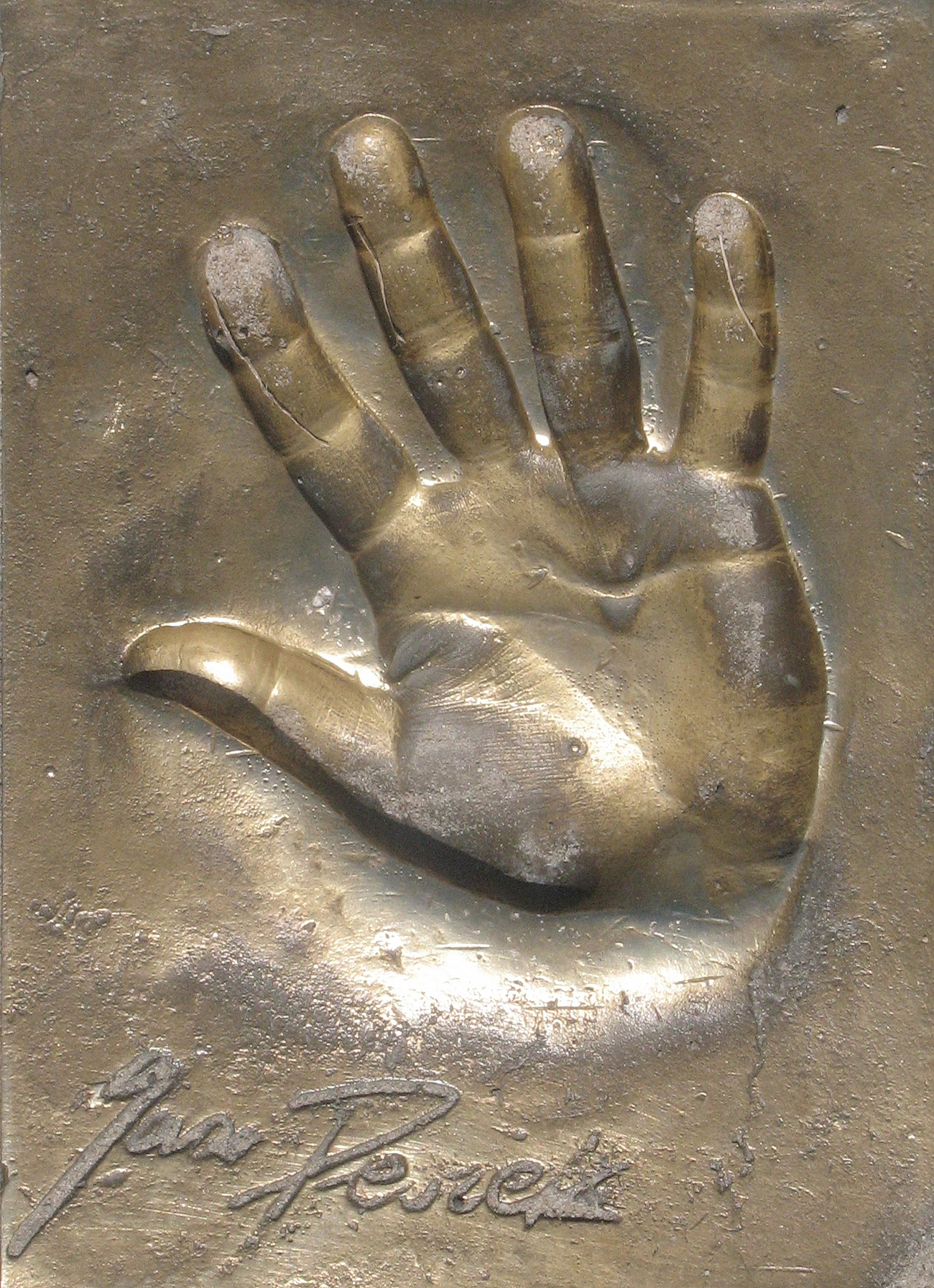
Jan Peszek's handprint and signature in Międzyzdroje

He has two children, both of whom are engaged in the arts: Maria, a singer and Błażej, an actor. He has strongly criticised the conservative Prawo i Sprawiedliwość party and the affiliated TVP television network.

== Selected filmography ==
Year	Title	Role
1969	Znaki na drodze	
1985	Write and Fight	
1988	The Tribulations of Balthazar Kober	
1990	The Bet	
1990	Escape from the 'Liberty' Cinema	
1990	Korczak	
1990	Farewell to Autumn	Count Lohoyski
2004	The Welts	
2023	Warszawianka	Tadeusz Czepułkowski
2024	Inheritance	Władysław Fortuna
2025	Zaprawdę Hitler umarł	Harold
