= Arturo Villaseñor =

Mexican politician

- Born: 30 May 1973 (age 52); Jalisco, Mexico
- Occupation: Politician
- Political party: PAN

Arturo Villaseñor Fernández (born 30 May 1973) is a Mexican politician from the National Action Party. In 2012 he served as Deputy of the LXI Legislature of the Mexican Congress representing Jalisco.
