= The Big Mill =

Former mill in Staffordshire, England (1857–2026)

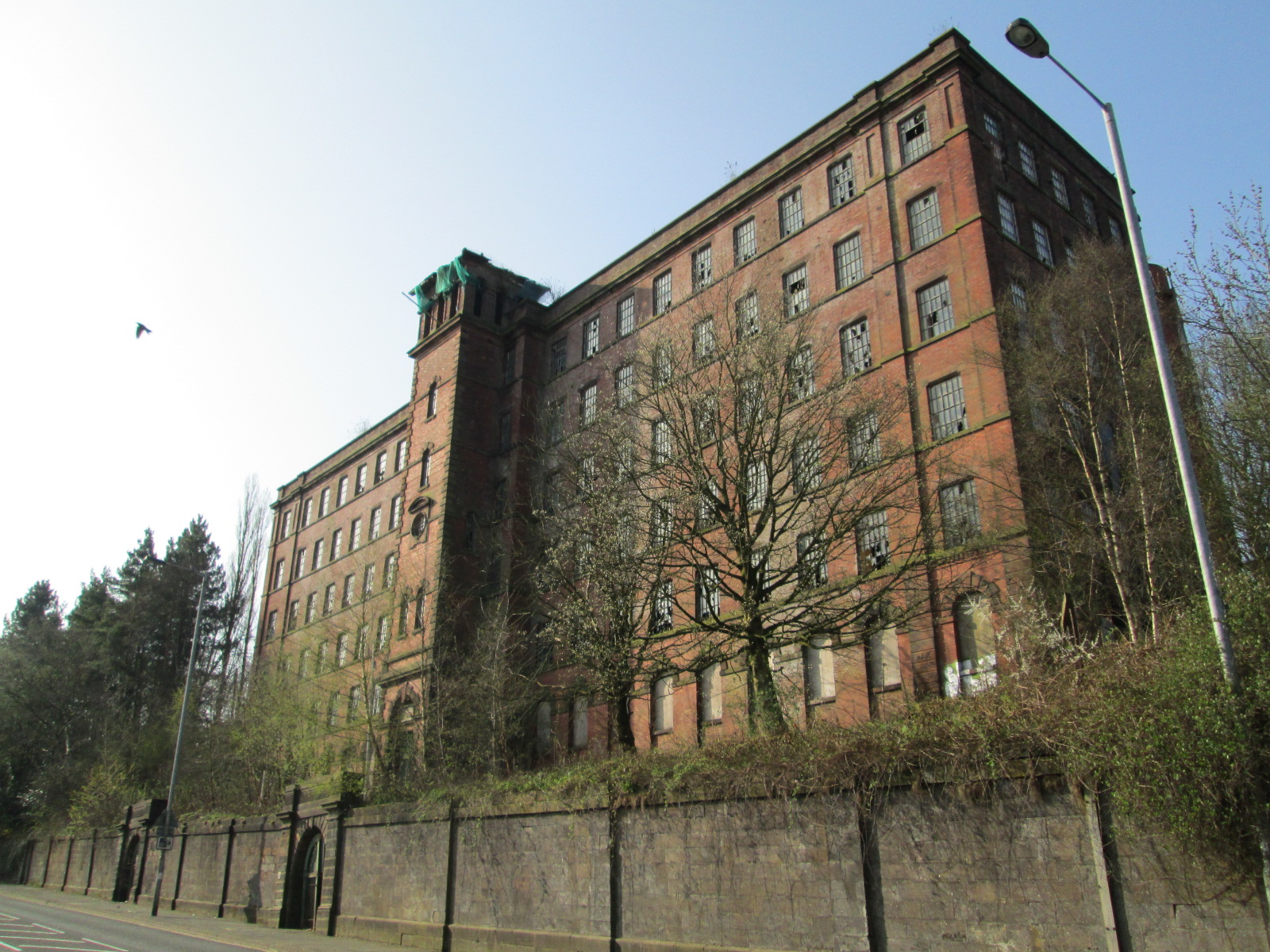
- The Big Mill in 2018

- Location within Staffordshire

General information
- Status: Demolished
- Location: Mill Street, [[Leek, Staffordshire]|Leek]], Staffordshire, England
- Coordinates: 53°06′28″N 2°01′54″W grid reference SJ 97966 56749
- Completed: 1857
- Demolished: 2026

Design and construction
- Architect: William Sugden

The Big Mill was a historic Grade II listed building on Mill Street in Leek, Staffordshire, England. It was designed by the Victorian architect William Sugden and built in 1857. The building, which had been approved for conversion into residential flats, was demolished after being gutted by a fire in March 2026.

== Description ==
Big Mill was designed by William Sugden, who with his son Larner designed many buildings in Leek in the second half of the 19th century. The building, of brick with stone dressings, had six storeys, with a range of 21 windows along its length and five windows along its width. There was a central stair tower, which had an arcaded top storey, and a doorway at its base. The listing text remarks that it "represents one of the earliest mill buildings on this scale in Leek".

== History ==
There was silk weaving in Leek in the 17th century, and the silk industry developed in the late 18th century. It remained domestic or quasi-domestic until the 19th century, when factories were erected that used steam power. There was one factory in 1818, and seven in 1835. Wellington Mill and London Mill, both silk mills built in 1853, are Grade II listed.

From 1858, Big Mill was occupied by Joseph Broster; from 1872 the building was shared by William Broster & Co, William Hammersley & Co, and by Wardle & Davenport, a firm formed in 1867. Henry Wardle, owner of an inn in Leek, provided the capital, and George Davenport, a silk throwster, ran the business.

In 1888, Big Mill was bought by the three partners Henry Davenport, his brother George and W. H. Rider. The company Wardle & Davenport became a limited company in 1899. It expanded, and they had several factories in the town by the 1920s. Big Mill was conveyed in 1920 to Peri-Lusta (established in 1919) and mercerised cotton was produced in the building. Wardle & Davenport suffered losses in the 1960s, and went into receivership in 1970.

Peri-Lusta left Big Mill in 1992, and with a smaller workforce moved to a building nearby.

Planning permission was granted in 2004 for the conversion of Big Mill into residential apartments. An amended application was made in 2019, which included a proposal to replace the internal structure with a steel frame. However, no development took place.

== Fire and demolition ==
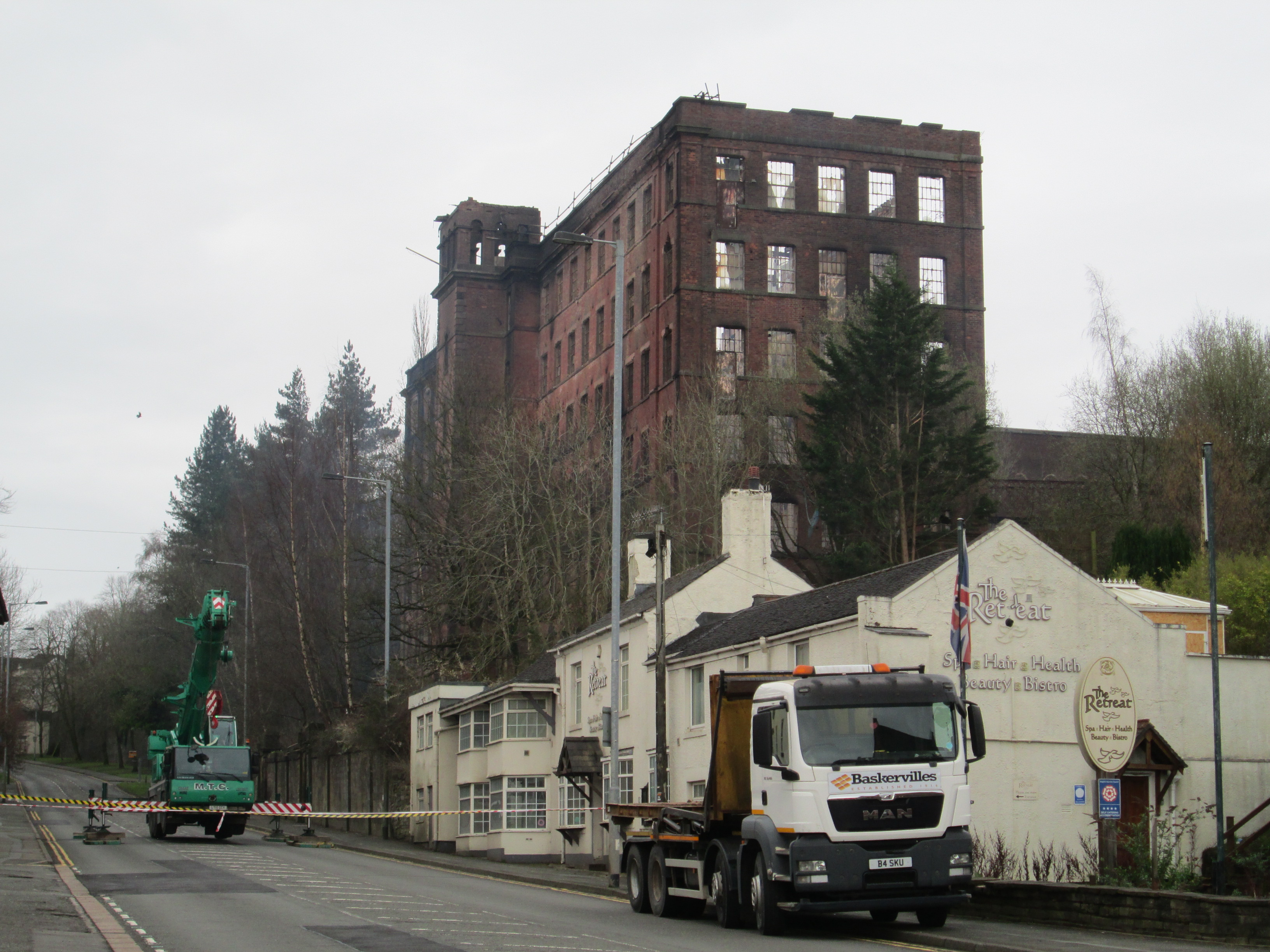
Big Mill after the fire and before demolition

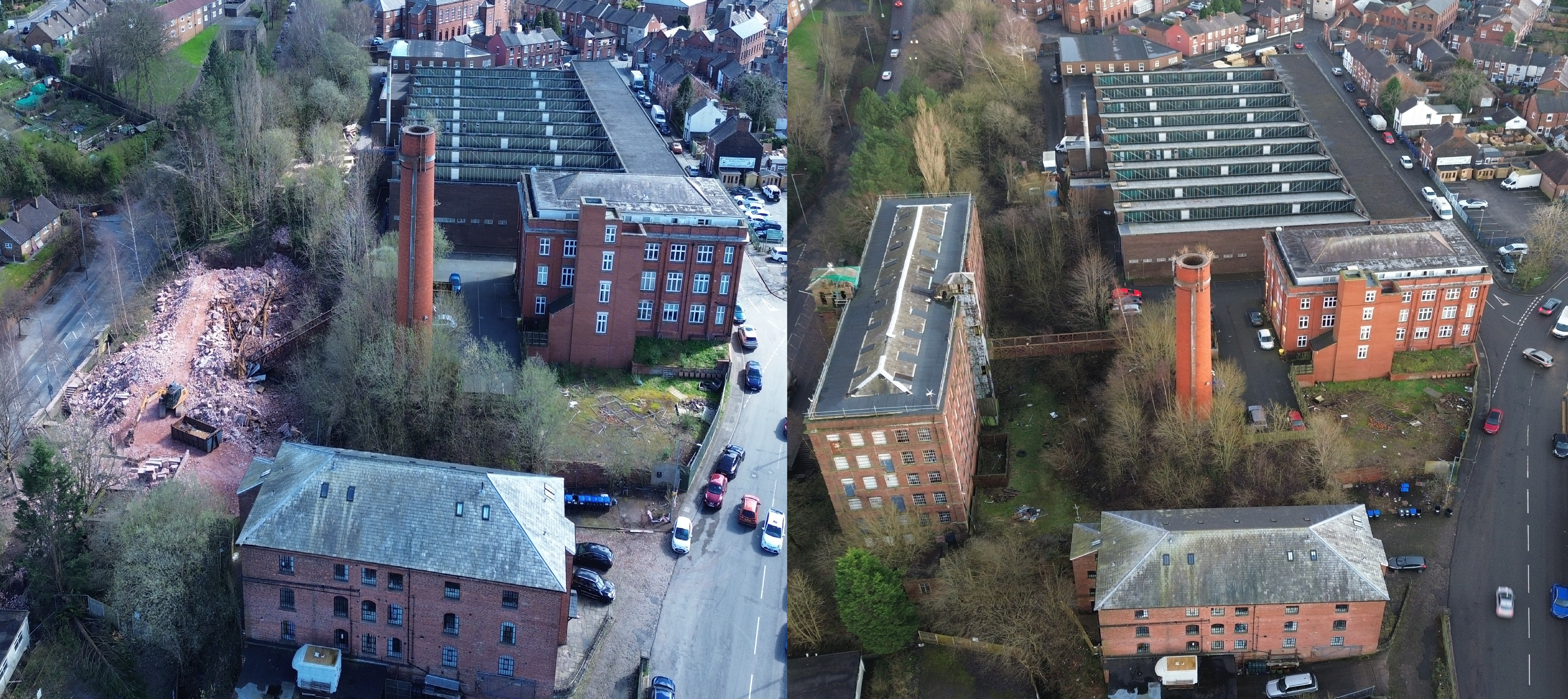
Aerial shots of Big Mill before and after demolition

On the evening of 27 March 2026, the building was gutted by fire, and was demolished over the following days. Mike Gledhill, leader of Staffordshire Moorlands District Council, said: "This was probably the best of Leek's mill buildings.... It is undoubtedly a major loss to the skyline."
