= Spotted Dog Running at the Edge of the Sea =

1991 film

- Directed by: Karen Gevorkian
- Written by: Chinghiz Aitmatov; Karen Gevorkian
- Starring: Bayarta Dambayev
- Cinematography: Karen Gevorkian
- Release date: July 1991
- Running time: 132 minutes
- Country: Soviet Union
- Language: Russian

Spotted Dog Running at the Edge of the Sea (Russian: Пегий пёс, бегущий краем моря, translit. Pegiy pyos, Begushchiy kraem morya) is a 1991 Soviet drama film directed by Karen Gevorkian, adapted from a novel by the same name by Kyrgyz writer Chinghiz Aitmatov. It won the Golden St. George and the Prix FIPRESCI at the 17th Moscow International Film Festival.

== Plot ==
The life of the Nivkh people, a small tribe living on the shores of the Sea of Okhotsk, is described.

The movie consists of two parts; first the parts shot on land (many of these parts are not in Aitmatov's novel) and the adventure at sea. The first part is a documentary shot in Sakhalin, the homeland of the Nivkhs, and presents sections from the lives of the locals. Examples of local culture are given, such as narrow houses living together in crowds, honor killings, bear hunting and bear ceremonies. The director showed how the tribe lived, hunted, danced and cast spells in real life.

The second part is based on Aitmatov's story. A boat is built with the ingenuity of the grandfather and the help of his sons. A ten-year-old boy goes fishing and seal hunting for the first time with his father, uncle and grandfather. However, they encounter a terrible problem. Mist descends on the sea, they get caught in the storm and lose the shore. When the drinking water is exhausted, the men decide to save the life of the child by sacrificing their own lives by putting themselves into the water one by one, each of them in turn.

== Cast ==
- Bayarta Dambayev
- Aleksandr Sasykov
- Doskhan Zholzhaksynov
- Tokon Dayirbekov
- Lyudmila Ivanova

== Bibliography ==
- Spotted Dog Running At The Edge Of the Sea, Kinoglaz, Clarke Fountain, Access date: 06 May 2022
- Pegiy pyos, Begushchiy kraem morya (1991), Goldposter, Ronald Levaco, Access date: 06 May 2022
- Pegiy pyos, Begushchiy kraem morya, Torino Film Festival, Museo Nazionale del Cinema, Access date: 06 May 2022
