= The Wedding Maidens =

1990 film

- Film poster
- Directed by: Wang Jin
- Written by: He Mengfan
- Based on: Five Girls and a Rope by Ye Weilin
- Starring: Chi Huaqiong
- Cinematography: Zhao Xiaoshi
- Edited by: Yan Xiuying; Zeng Shiwei
- Music by: Wang Shi
- Production companies: Zhujiang Film Production Company; Yindu Institution Co., Ltd.
- Release date: 10 September 1990
- Running time: 90 minutes
- Country: China
- Language: Mandarin

The Wedding Maidens (Chinese: 出嫁女; pinyin: Chūjià nǚ) is a 1990 Chinese drama film directed by Wang Jin. It was entered into the 17th Moscow International Film Festival where it won the Special Silver St. George.

== Cast ==
- Chi Huaqiong as Jinmei
- Jin Di as Xin Liang
- Ju Xue as Hexiang
- Ning Li as Sibao
- Pu Chaoying as Wife of Hexiang's brother
- Tao Huimin as Aiyue
- Wei Jian as Mingtao's father
- Wang Meihua as Guijuan's sister
- Zhang Liwei as Stepmother
