= 17th Moscow International Film Festival =

Film festival

- Location: Moscow, Soviet Union
- Founded: 1959
- Awards: Grand Prix
- Festival date: 8–19 July 1991
- Website: Website

The 17th Moscow International Film Festival was held from 8 to 19 July 1991. The Golden St. George was awarded to the Soviet-German film Spotted Dog Running at the Edge of the Sea directed by Karen Gevorkian.

== Jury ==
- Oleg Yankovsky (Soviet Union – President of the Jury)
- Márta Mészáros (Hungary)
- Gabriele Rohrer-Kumlin (Germany)
- Kang Soo-yeon (South Korea)
- Michèle Mercier (France)
- Dušan Makavejev (Yugoslavia)
- Luigi Magni (Italy)
- Manuel Gutiérrez Aragón (Spain)

== Films in competition ==
The following films were selected for the main competition:

English title	Original title	Director(s)	Production country
Silent Gunpowder	Gluvi barut	Bato Čengić	Yugoslavia
Class Action	Class Action	Michael Apted	United States
Itt a szabadság!	Itt a szabadság!	Péter Vajda	Hungary
The Doors	The Doors	Oliver Stone	United States
Homework	La tarea	Jaime Humberto Hermosillo	Mexico
Don Juan in Hell	Don Juan en los infiernos	Gonzalo Suárez	Spain
War in the Land of Egypt	Al-moaten Masry	Salah Abu Seif	Egypt
Madame Bovary	Madame Bovary	Claude Chabrol	France
The Wedding Maidens	Chujia nu	Jin Wang	China
Father	Father	John Power	Australia
Always & Forever	Immer und ewig	Samir	Switzerland
The Bet	Zakład	Teresa Kotlarczyk	Poland
Spotted Dog Running at the Edge of the Sea	Pegiy pyos, Begushchiy kraem morya	Karen Gevorkian	Soviet Union, Germany
Towards Evening	Verso sera	Francesca Archibugi	Italy, France
The Way to Cheong Song	Cheongsongeuro ganeun kil	Lee Doo-yong	South Korea
Matti Manushulu	Matti Manushulu	B. Narsing Rao	India
Romeo	Romeo	Rita Horst	Netherlands
The Garden	The Garden	Derek Jarman	United Kingdom, Germany
The Adjuster	The Adjuster	Atom Egoyan	Canada
Sons of Bitches	Sukiny deti	Leonid Filatov	Soviet Union
Walerjan Wrobel's Homesickness	Das Heimweh des Walerjan Wróbel	Rolf Schübel	Germany
Cup Final	Gmar gavi'a	Eran Riklis	Israel

== Awards ==
- Golden St. George: Spotted Dog Running at the Edge of the Sea by Karen Gevorkian
- Special Silver St. George:
  - The Adjuster by Atom Egoyan
  - The Wedding Maidens by Jin Wang
- Silver St. George:
  - Actor: Mustafa Nadarević, Branislav Lečić for Silent Gunpowder
  - Actress: Isabelle Huppert for Madame Bovary
- Special Mention: Homework by Jaime Humberto Hermosillo
- Prix FIPRESCI: Spotted Dog Running at the Edge of the Sea by Karen Gevorkian
- Special Diplomas: Matti Manushulu by B. Narsing Rao
- Special Mention: A Woman Between Two Brothers by Amir Karakulov (non-competition film)
- Prix of Ecumenical Jury: Spotted Dog Running at the Edge of the Sea by Karen Gevorkian
- Special Mention: Walerjan Wrobel's Homesickness by Rolf Schübel
