= Karen Gevorkian =

Soviet film director (born 1941)

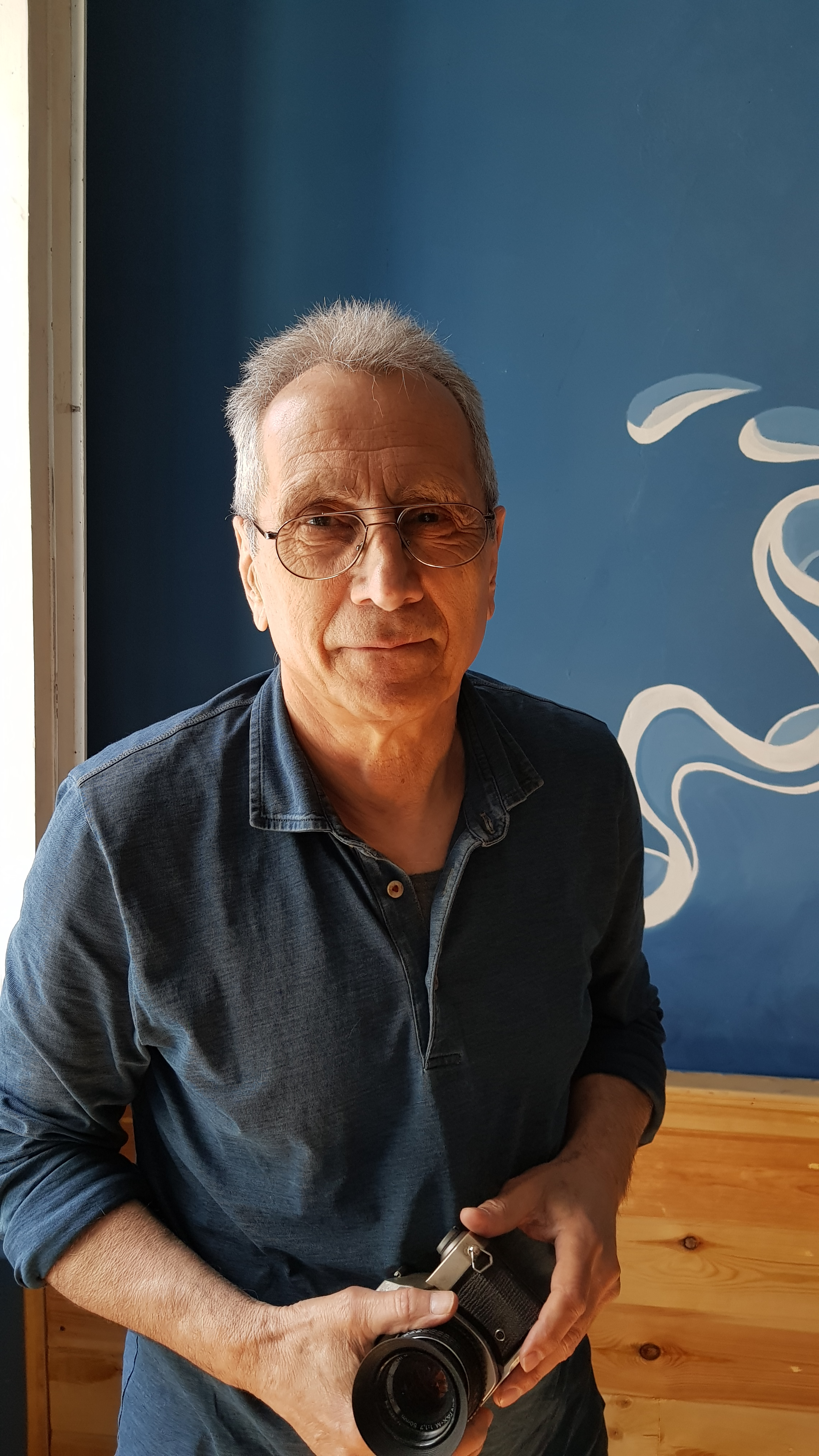
Karen Gevorkian

Karen Gevorkian (born 7 May 1941) is an Armenian Soviet-Russian film director and screenwriter. He directed the film Spotted Dog Running at the Edge of the Sea, which won the Golden St. George at the 17th Moscow International Film Festival.

== Biography ==
Gevorkian was born in Moscow into a musical family. He began studying the bassoon at the age of fourteen with Latvian bassoon soloist Andris Arnicans. Just one year later, he entered into the Gnessin Musical College. After working for a short period of time at Armenfilm Studios as a cinematographer, he studied and finished courses in Advanced Directing in Moscow.
