= Strange Pilgrims =

Collection of twelve loosely related short stories by Gabriel García Márquez

First edition

Strange Pilgrims (Spanish: Doce cuentos peregrinos, lit. 'Twelve Pilgrim Stories') is a collection of twelve loosely related short stories by the Nobel Prize–winning Colombian writer Gabriel García Márquez.

Not published until 1992, the stories that make up this collection were originally written during the seventies and eighties. Each of the stories touches on the theme of dislocation and the strangeness of life in a foreign land, although quite what "foreign" means is one of García Márquez's central questions. García Márquez himself spent some years as a virtual exile from his native Colombia.

== The 12 Stories ==
The twelve stories are:

1. Bon Voyage, Mr President (Buen Viaje, Señor Presidente)
2. The Saint (La Santa)
3. Sleeping Beauty and the Airplane (El Avión de la Bella Durmiente)
4. I Sell My Dreams (Me Alquilo para Soñar)
5. I Only Came to Use the Phone (Solo Vine a Hablar por Teléfono)
6. The Ghosts of August (Espantos de Agosto)
7. María dos Prazeres
8. Seventeen Poisoned Englishmen (Diecisiete Ingleses Envenenados)
9. Tramontana
10. Miss Forbes's Summer of Happiness (El Verano Feliz de la Señora Forbes)
11. Light is Like Water (La Luz es como el Agua)
12. The Trail of Your Blood in the Snow (El Rastro de tu Sangre en la Nieve)

== Story summaries ==
=== Bon Voyage, Mr. President ===
An overthrown Latin American president, Mr. President, is exiled to Martinique. The 73-year-old man develops a peculiar pain in his ribs, lower abdomen, and groin. He travels to Geneva, Switzerland in search of a diagnosis. After extensive medical testing, he is informed that the problem resides in his spine. A risky operation is recommended to relieve the pain. The President meets a fellow countryman, Homero Rey, who works as an ambulance driver at the hospital. Homero schemes to sell an insurance plan and funeral package to the sick man, but the President is no longer wealthy and lives frugally. He is reduced to selling his dead wife's jewelry and other trinkets to pay the cost of his medical expenses and operation. Homero and his wife, Lázara, grow fond of Mr. President. They provide financial assistance and care for him after he is discharged from the hospital. The President returns to Martinique. His pain is unimproved but no worse either. He resumes many of his bad habits and considers going back to the country he once ruled, only this time as the head of a reform group.

=== The Saint ===
The story is centered on a character named Margarito Duarte and takes place in Rome. Margarito is originally from a small Andean village in Tolima, Colombia but travels to Rome in order to begin the process of having his deceased daughter recognized as a saint. Margarito lost his wife shortly after the birth of their only daughter and she died soon after at the age of seven from an essential fever. Eleven years after her death the villagers are forced to move their loved ones from the cemetery to another location as the space is needed for a new dam. When his daughter is unearthed she is found to be still intact and completely weightless. The villagers decide that she is a saint and pool funds to send Margarito with his daughter's body to Rome. There he meets the narrator at the pensione where they are both staying. Nothing seems to come from his inexhaustible attempts to canonize his daughter and he eventually loses contact with the narrator and other characters of the story. However, twenty-two years later, and after the death of four popes, Margarito and the narrator meet again by chance and the narrator finds that Margarito is still waiting for his daughter's recognition as a saint. It is then that the narrator realizes that the true saint of the story is really Margarito. The narrator states, "Without realizing it, by means of his daughter's incorruptible body and while he was still alive, he had spent twenty-two years fighting for the legitimate cause of his own canonization."

=== The Airplane of the Sleeping Beauty ===
A man reflects on a peculiar flight experience from Paris to New York when the beautiful woman seated next to him asks him to not, under any circumstances, let anyone disturb her sleep during the flight. The woman remains asleep throughout the entire flight thanks to the help of the man, who thwarts any efforts by the flight attendant to awaken her but he becomes increasingly obsessed and fascinated with the sleeping woman and the situation. The narrator imagines the woman as an almost unreachable object of desire, akin to Sleeping Beauty. As the flight continues, he contemplates the nature of his obsession with her slumber and the possible parallels to the voyeuristic tendencies of others. After an eventful night, he reflects on how life can pass by unnoticed, and when the woman finally awakens, she behaves indifferently towards him, leaving him with a sense of disappointment and realization about the fleeting nature of connections. "The Airplane of the Sleeping Beauty" recounts García Márquez's personal impressions, when he fell in love at first sight with a woman at an airport in Paris.

=== I Sell My Dreams ===
One day, while the narrator was having breakfast in the morning at the Havana Riviera Hotel, a gigantic wave crashed down ("like an explosion of dynamite") on the shore, picking up and overturning several cars. Under one of smashed cars was found a woman wearing "a gold ring shaped like a serpent, with emerald eyes". Her eyes and ring reminded the narrator of "an unforgettable woman", who used to wear "a similar ring on her right forefinger", whom he met thirty-four years earlier in Vienna, which was an old imperial city back then. When she was asked "how had she come to be in a world so distant and different from the windy cliffs of Quindio", she answered "I sell my dreams." Born third of eleven children to a prosperous shopkeeper in old Caldas, selling dreams was her only trade. In her childhood her dreams began to show oracular qualities, and she turned them into a source of earnings. One night, she told the narrator to leave Vienna. Considering her conviction real, the narrator boarded the last train to Rome that same night and "considered himself a survivor of some catastrophe". Later the narrator happened to meet Pablo Neruda and they found that the woman had earned affluence by selling dreams. They spent time together for some days. One day Neruda "dreamed about the woman who dream(ed)"s. Later after Neruda "took his leave", the narrator met the woman and she said "I dreamed he (Neruda) was dreaming about me." After that day, the narrator never met her again. After the Havana Riviera disaster, the narrator met the Portuguese ambassador with whom that woman wearing a snake ring come and he asked him "what did she do?" He (the ambassador) answered with a certain disenchantment "Nothing," "she dreamed."

=== I Only Came To Use The Phone ===
A woman's car breaks down in the middle of nowhere and she tries to seek help at a nearby building, which she believes is a place to use the phone. She unknowingly hitches a ride on a bus on its way to a mental institute. Despite her protests and attempts to explain her situation, the staff refuse to release her, insisting she become a patient. Her husband, referring to their trouble-ridden history, believes she has run off with another man. When she finally finds an opportunity to call him, he curses her and hangs up. She is forced to sleep with a guard to pass along the full message to her husband. When he arrives, he takes the doctor's account to heart and leaves the woman at the hospital, where she eventually adopts the role of insanity imposed upon her by the medical staff.

=== The Ghosts of August ===
A family vacationing in Tuscany decides to spend the night in a castle owned by a friend. The builder of the castle, Ludovico, a renaissance nobleman, killed his bride in bed, before setting his dogs upon himself. The family, disregarding this as a ghost tale, goes to sleep in a creepy guest room, only to awake in the bedchamber of Ludovico, with fresh blood on the sheets and a scent of fresh strawberries in the air.

=== María dos Prazeres ===
Maria dos Prazeres has recently had a vision of death at the age of seventy-six and wants to make all preparations before her death. She has picked out a plot for her burial on the hill cemetery, Montjuich. She meticulously trains her dog Noi to travel to the cemetery and to be able to pick out her grave on the vast hill so that he can visit and shed tears there every Sunday. She also makes sure her grave stone is nameless, like other anarchists chose under in Francoist Spain. She also held a long-standing relationship with the Count of Cardona, a man who worked under Francisco Franco, but the relationship was cut off because it had become stale. One rainy day in November, she gets a ride from the cemetery back home and she finds that she had made an error in interpreting her vision.

=== Seventeen Poisoned Englishmen ===
Prudencia Linero, a grieving widow, travels to Naples, Italy, after the death of her husband. She is motivated by a deep desire to see the Pope, believing it will help her find solace. However, her journey is marked by cultural shocks and disappointment. The chaotic and indifferent atmosphere of Naples contrasts starkly with her expectations of the solemnity associated with the Pope's presence. During her stay, she becomes increasingly overwhelmed by the city’s indifference to violence and decay. She encounters grotesque sights, including the titular "seventeen poisoned Englishmen," which symbolizes the absurdity and indifference she perceives in her surroundings. Despite her efforts, Prudencia's pilgrimage leaves her feeling disillusioned, highlighting themes of grief, cultural disconnection, and the struggle to find meaning amidst loss.

=== Tramontana ===
The narrator describes his family's journey through a village where the locals are inexplicably terrified of the tramontana, a cold, northern wind that sweeps through the area. The wind is portrayed as a mysterious and almost supernatural force that seems to control the villagers' behavior. They react to its presence with anxiety, fear, and a sense of inevitability, leading the narrator to explore the strange grip it holds over them. The story touches on themes of superstition, the unknown, and the irrational fear that something beyond human control can impose itself on daily life. The narrator's observations reveal the intense psychological and emotional effects that the wind has on the community, even though the wind itself is a natural phenomenon.

=== Miss Forbes's Summer of Happiness ===
While their parents are away two young boys have the serenity of a peaceful summer holiday ruined by the intervention of a strict German nanny. The nanny named Miss Forbes treats the boys terribly making them stay locked in the house and eat the most disgusting of foods, while she is free to roam as she pleases and indulges herself in delicious meals. The boys poison her wine in an attempt to kill her. After they believe she is dead they go off to play. When they come back they find their house surrounded by police and investigators because the body of Miss Forbes was found dead, not by poison, but from multiple stab wounds on her body.

=== Light is Like Water ===
Two young boys, Toto and Joel, live in Madrid with their parents. They ask for a boat in return for their good grades, even though their apartment is far from any water. When their parents finally buy them the rowboat, they break the light bulbs in their home and the light comes flowing out like water. They use the light to navigate around their home every Wednesday, and invite their friends to go sailing with them as well. The boys' friends end up drowning in the light.

=== The Trail of Your Blood in the Snow ===
Billy Sanchez and Nena Daconte, children of two wealthy Colombian families, fly to Europe to celebrate their honeymoon. Although just married, Nena is already two months pregnant. After she scrapes her ring finger on a rose thorn, the nearly imperceptible cut starts bleeding profusely. Nena is admitted to the intensive care unit of a Paris hospital. Visitation is permitted only one day a week so Billy must wait six days before he can see his wife again. He spends most of his time alone in a nearby hotel. Billy tries to visit Nena sooner but is thrown out of the hospital by a security guard. Billy’s attempt to enlist the aid of the foreign embassy is equally unsuccessful. When Tuesday’s visiting hours finally arrive, Billy cannot locate his wife. He spots the physician who first evaluated Nena. The doctor regretfully announces that Nena bled to death 60 hours after hospital admission. No one could find Billy to apprise him of the situation so Nena’s parents have already arranged the funeral and transported the body home for burial. Billy exits the hospital with thoughts of violence and revenge for his calamity.
