= 2023 Polish Film Awards =

25th Polish Film Awards
- Date: 6 March 2023
- Site: Polish Theatre, Warsaw, Poland
- Hosted by: Maciej Stuhr

Television coverage
- Network: Canal+

The 25th Polish Film Awards took place on 6 March 2023 at the Polish Theatre in Warsaw, Poland. The ceremony honored the best in Polish cinema of 2022, presented by the Polish Film Academy. It was hosted by actor and comedian Maciej Stuhr and broadcast on Canal+.

Road drama film EO won the most awards with six, including Best Film. Other winners included Johnny with four and Below the Surface with two.

== Winners and nominees ==
The nominations were announced on 8 February 2023 at the Canal+ studio in Warsaw, Poland. The nominations were led by EO with eleven, followed by Johnny with eight.

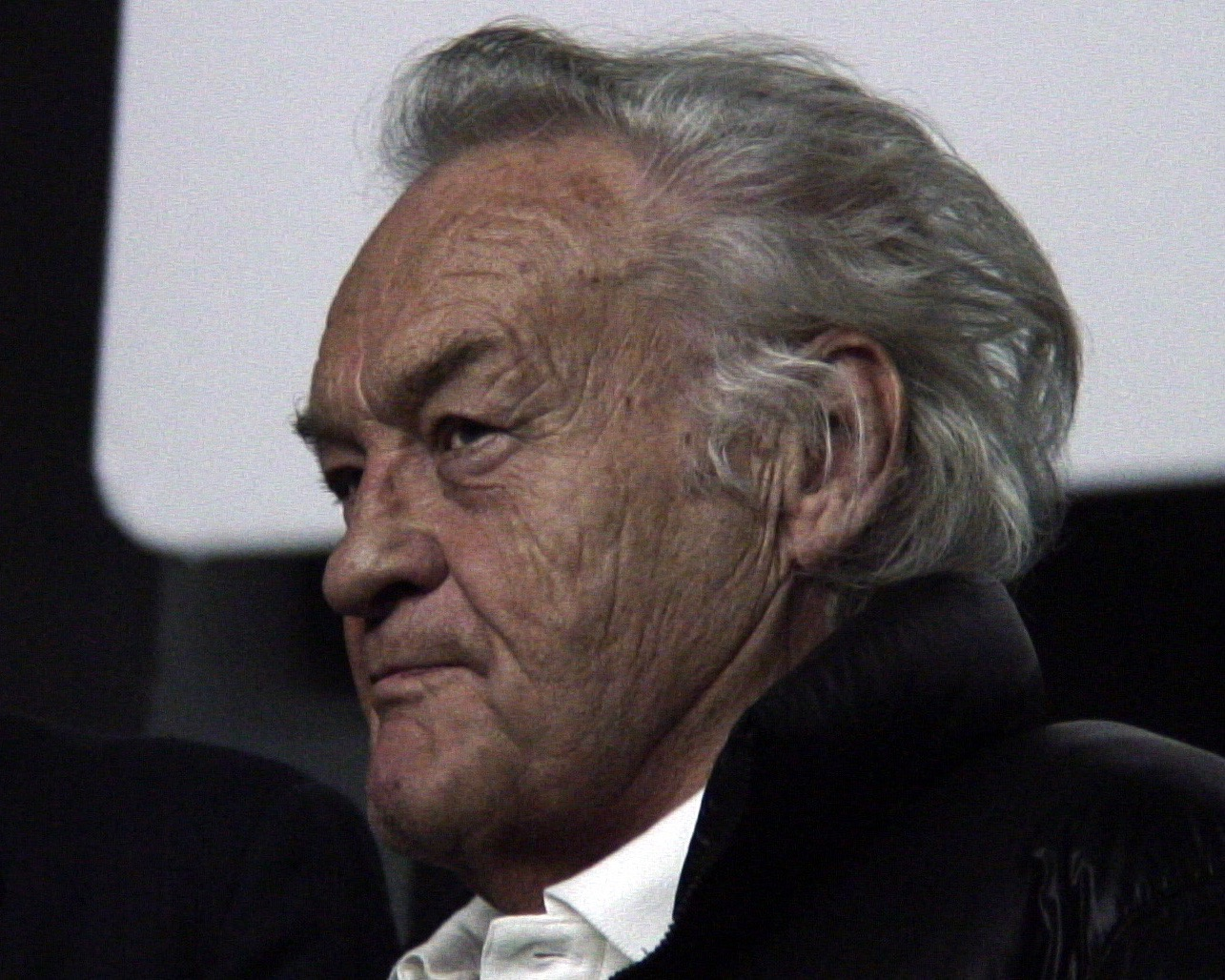
Jerzy Skolimowski, Best Film, Best Director, and Best Screenplay winner

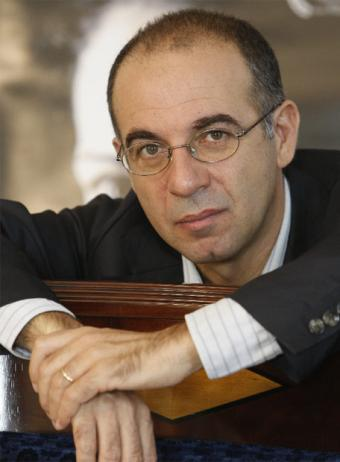
Giuseppe Tornatore, Best European Film winner

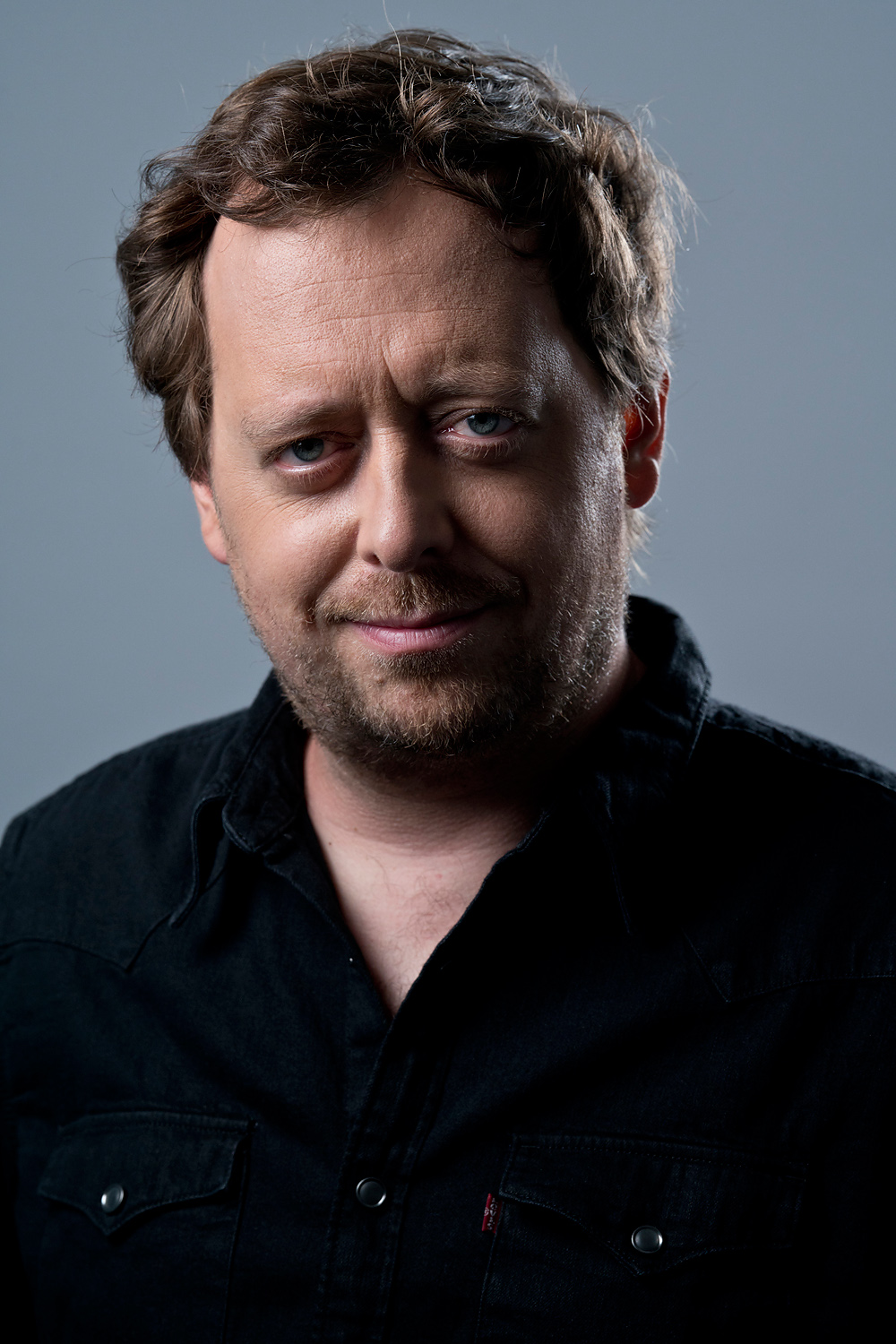
Jan Holoubek, Best TV Series co-winner

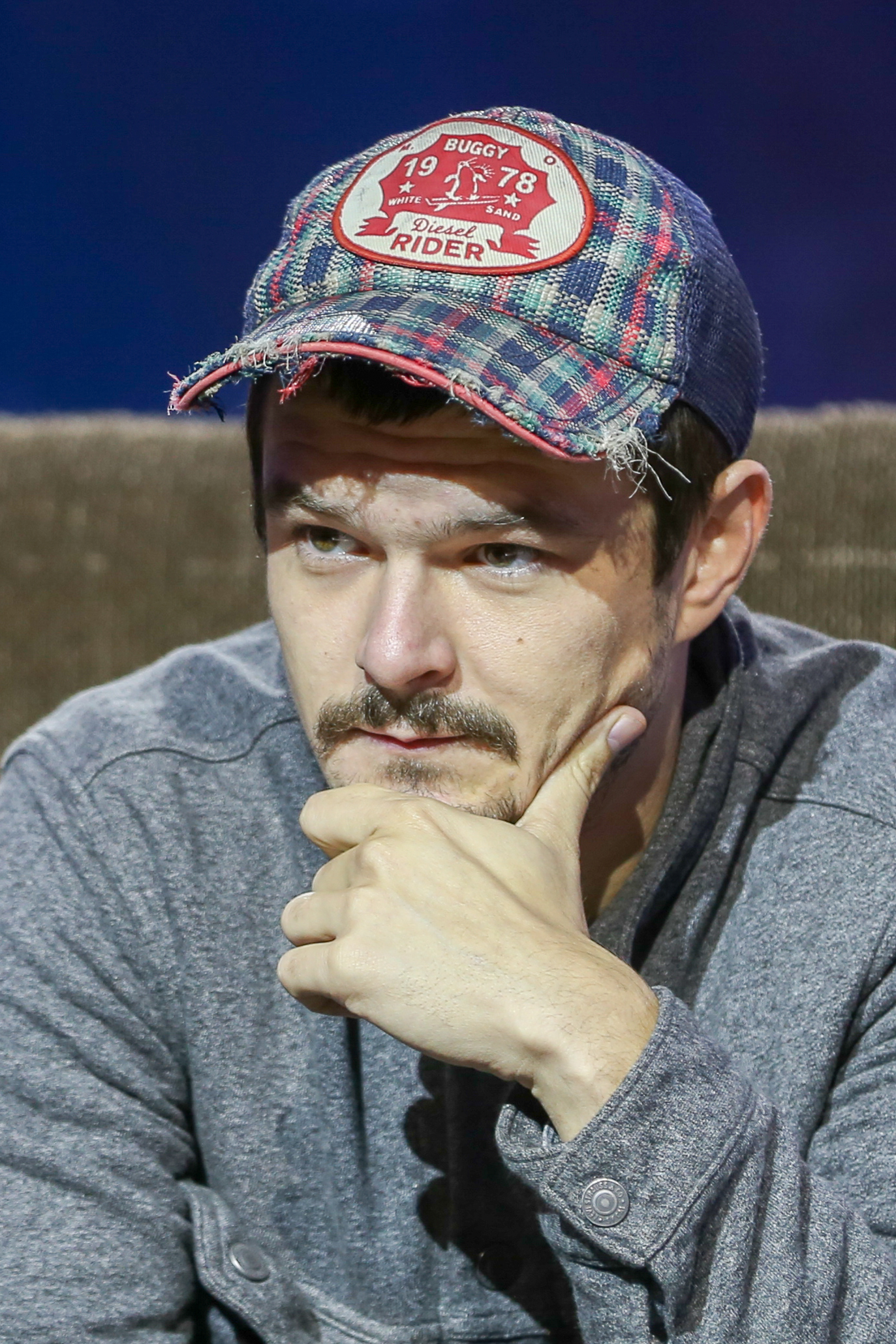
Dawid Ogrodnik, Best Actor winner

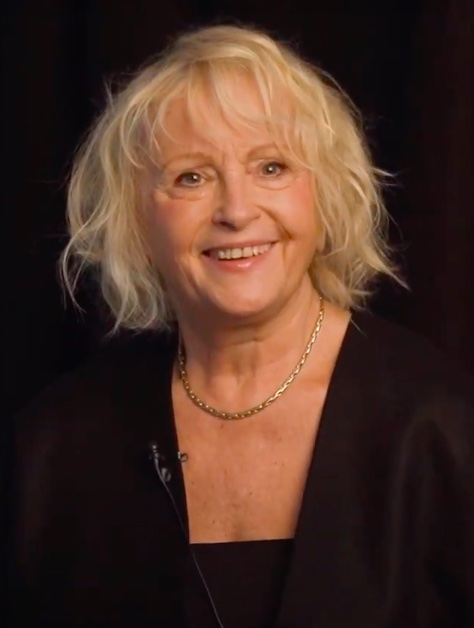
Dorota Pomykała, Best Actress winner

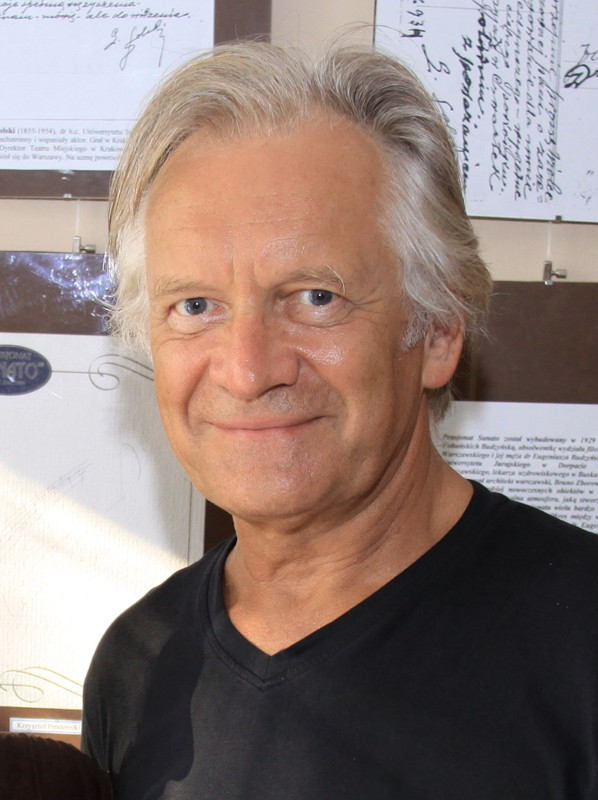
Andrzej Seweryn, Best Supporting Actor winner

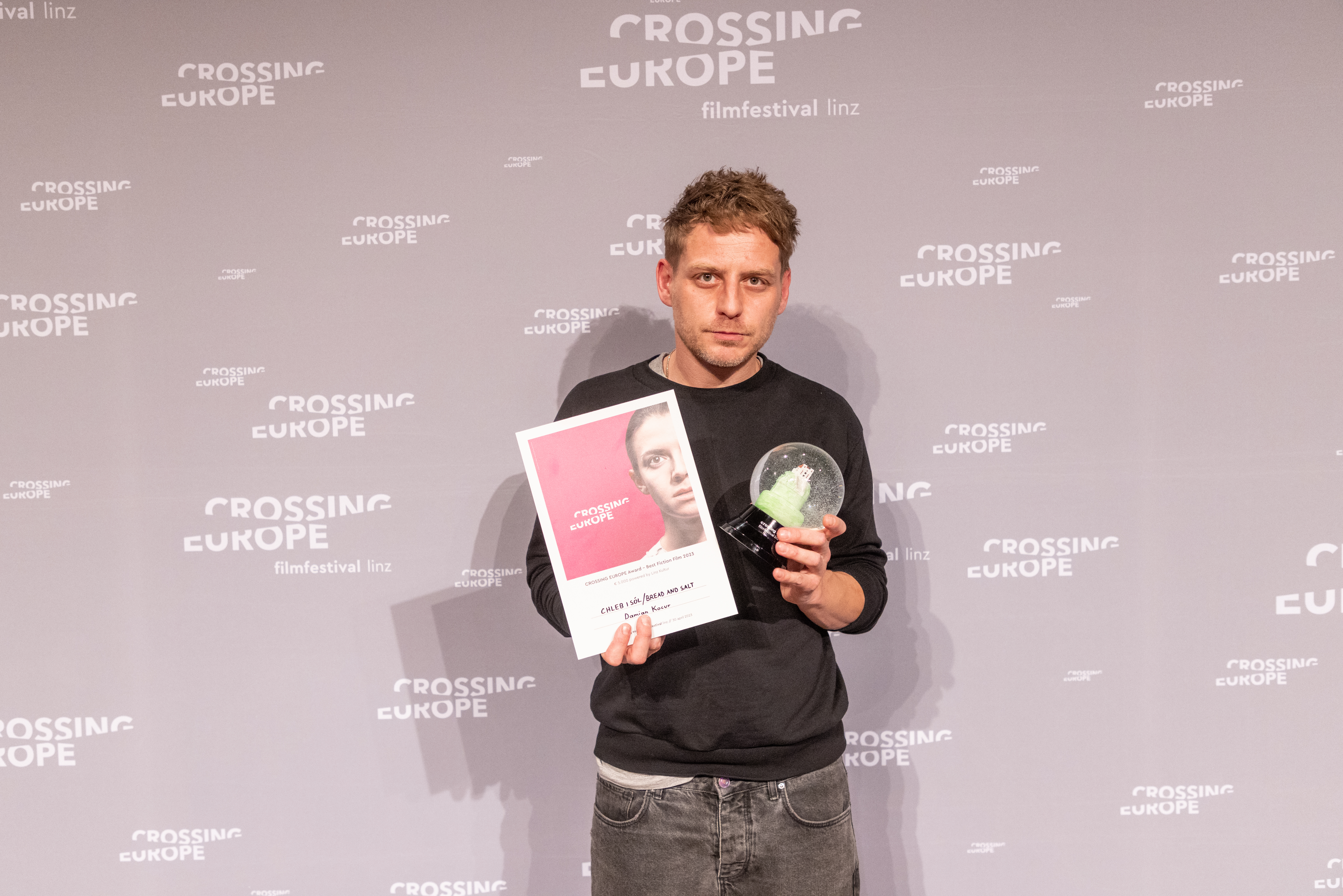
Damian Kocur, Discovery of the Year winner

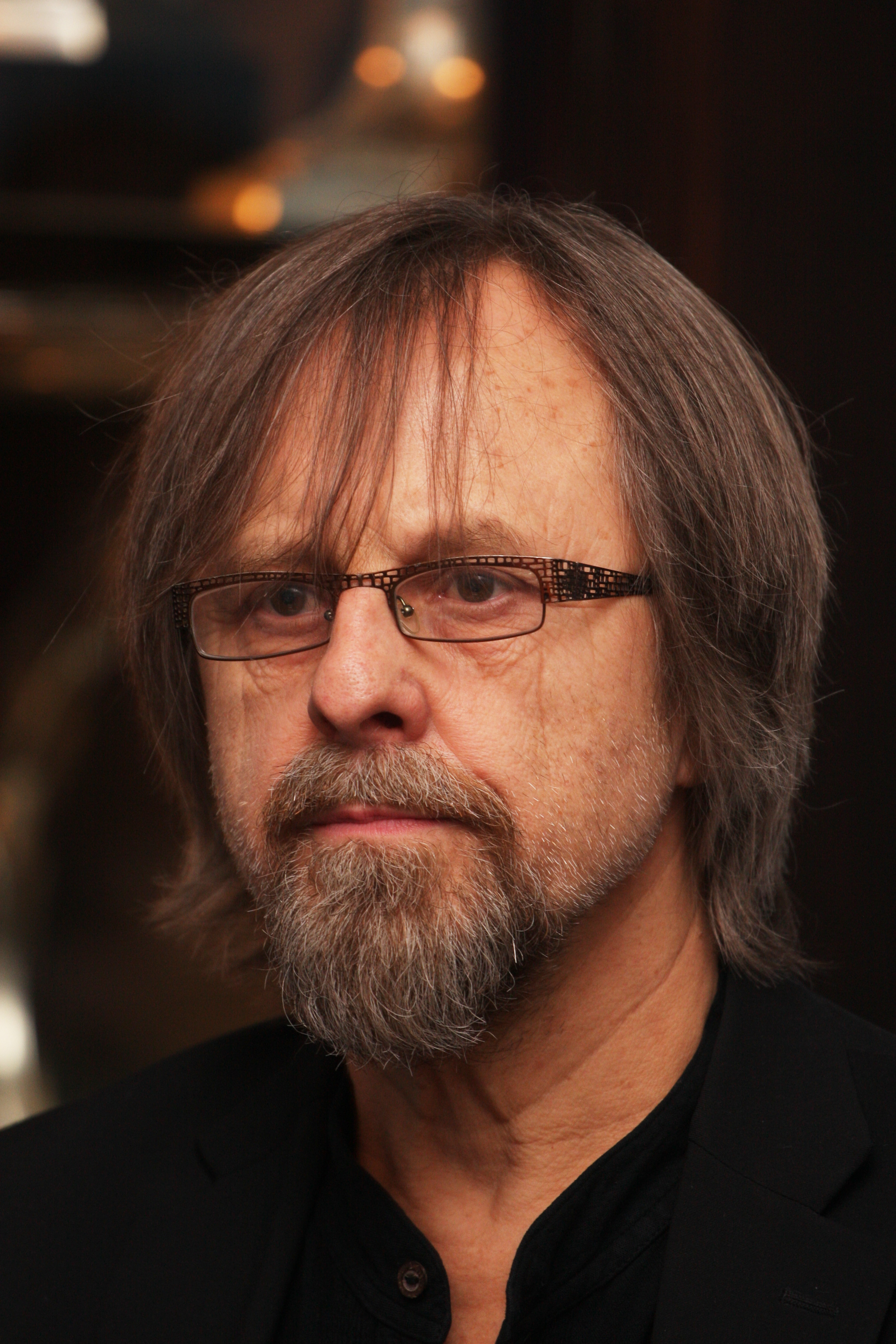
Jan A. P. Kaczmarek, Life Achievement Award winner

=== Awards ===
Winners are listed first, highlighted in boldface, and indicated with a double dagger (‡).

**Best Film**: **EO – Directed by Jerzy Skolimowski**‡; Bread and Salt – Directed by Damian Kocur; Johnny – Directed by Daniel Jaroszek; The Silent Twins – Directed by Agnieszka Smoczyńska; Woman on the Roof – Directed by Anna Jadowska	**Best European Film**: **Ennio – Directed by Giuseppe Tornatore (Italy / Belgium / Japan / Netherlands)**‡; Parallel Mothers – Directed by Pedro Almodóvar (Spain); Paris, 13th District – Directed by Jacques Audiard (France); Vortex – Directed by Gaspar Noé (France / Belgium / Monaco); The Worst Person in the World – Directed by Joachim Trier (Norway / France / Denmark / Sweden)
**Best TV Series**: **High Water – Directed by Jan Holoubek and Bartłomiej Ignaciuk; Screenplay by Kasper Bajon and Kinga Krzemińska (Netflix)**‡; A Minute of Silence – Directed by Jacek Lusiński; Screenplay by Jacek Lusiński and Szymon Augustyniak (Canal+ Premium); Queen – Directed by Łukasz Kośmicki; Screenplay by Árni Ólafur Ásgeirsson, Ottó Geir Borg, and Kacper Wysocki (Netflix); Raven (season 3) – Directed by Maciej Pieprzyca and Adrian Panek; Screenplay by Jakub Korolczuk (Canal+ Premium); The Thaw – Directed by Xawery Żuławski; Screenplay by Marta Szymanek and Piotr Szymanek (HBO Max)	**Best Director**: **Jerzy Skolimowski – EO**‡; Anna Jadowska – Woman on the Roof; Damian Kocur – Bread and Salt; Agnieszka Smoczyńska – The Silent Twins; Aleksandra Terpińska – Other People
**Best Actor**: **Dawid Ogrodnik – Johnny as Jan Kaczkowski**‡; Jacek Beler – Other People as Kamil; Ireneusz Czop – Broad Peak as Maciej Berbeka; Tomasz Schuchardt – The Christening as Wojtek; Piotr Trojan – Johnny as Patryk Galewski	**Best Actress**: **Dorota Pomykała – Woman on the Roof as Mira Napieralska**‡; Sandra Drzymalska – EO as Kasandra; Katarzyna Figura – The Christening as Marianna; Małgorzata Gorol – Backwards as Marysia; Agnieszka Grochowska – Fucking Bornholm as Maja Malecka
**Best Supporting Actor**: **Andrzej Seweryn – Backwards as Feliks Mazur**‡; Grzegorz Damięcki – Fucking Bornholm as Dawid; Sebastian Fabijański – It Came from the Water as "Blitz"; Andrzej Konopka – The Christening as Ksiądz Wiesław; Mateusz Kościukiewicz – EO as Mateo	**Best Supporting Actress**: **Maria Pakulnis – Johnny as Hanna**‡; Matylda Damięcka – It Came from the Water as Robsonica; Magdalena Koleśnik – Other People as Aneta; Aleksandra Konieczna – Backwards as High School Principal; Maja Ostaszewska – Broad Peak as Ewa Dyakowska-Berbeka
**Best Screenplay**: **EO – Jerzy Skolimowski and Ewa Piaskowska**‡; Backwards – Jacek Lusiński and Szymon Augustyniak; Bread and Salt – Damian Kocur; Johnny – Maciej Kraszewski; Other People – Aleksandra Terpińska; Woman on the Roof – Anna Jadowska	**Best Cinematography**: **EO – Michał Dymek**‡; Below the Surface – Jolanta Dylewska; Bread and Salt – Tomasz Woźniczka; Broad Peak – Łukasz Gutt; The Silent Twins – Jakub Kijowski
**Best Production Design**: **Below the Surface – Marcelina Początek-Kunikowska**‡; The Christening – Aleksandra Klemens; EO – Mirosław Koncewicz; March 1968 – Ewa Skoczkowska; Woman on the Roof – Anna Pabisiak	**Best Makeup and Hairstyling**: **Johnny – Liliana Gałązka**‡; Below the Surface – Dariusz Krysiak; Brigitte Bardot Forever – Agnieszka Jońca; Broad Peak – Katarzyna Wilk; March 1968 – Liliana Gałązka and Ludmiła Krawczyk; Prophet – Tomasz Matraszek
**Best Costume Design**: **Brigitte Bardot Forever – Dorota Roqueplo**‡; Backwards – Anna Englert; Below the Surface – Małgorzata Zacharska; Broad Peak – Agata Culak; The Christening – Dominika Gebel; EO – Katarzyna Lewińska; It Came from the Water – Anna Englert; March 1968 – Dorota Roqueplo; The Silent Twins – Katarzyna Lewińska	**Best Film Score**: **EO – Paweł Mykietyn**‡; Bejbis – Marek Napiórkowski; March 1968 – Bartłomiej Gliniak; The Silent Twins – Marcin Macuk and Zuzanna Wrońska; Święta inaczej – Maciej Zieliński; Szczęścia chodzą parami – Adrian Konarski
**Best Sound**: **Below the Surface – Radosław Ochnio and Michał Fojcik**‡; Backwards – Marcin Kasiński, Kacper Habisiak, and Tomasz Wieczorek; The Christening – Adam Szmit and Michał Bagiński; EO – Radosław Ochnio, Marcin Matlak, and Marta Weronika Werońska; Johnny – Sebastian Brański, Wojciech Mielimąka, and Filip Krzemień; March 1968 – Marcin Ejsmund and Mirosław Makowski; Silent Land – Zofia Moruś and Marek Polenda; The Silent Twins – Marcin Lenarczyk and Maria Chilarecka	**Best Editing**: **EO – Agnieszka Glińska**‡; Below the Surface – Piotr Wójcik and Bartłomiej Piasek; It Came from the Water – Wojciech Włodarski; Other People – Magdalena Chowańska; The Silent Twins – Agnieszka Glińska
**Best Documentary**: **The Pawnshop – Directed by Łukasz Kowalski**‡; Angels of Sinjar – Directed by Hanna Polak; Fledglings – Directed by Lidia Duda; The Hamlet Syndrome – Directed by Elwira Niewiera and Piotr Rosołowski; Silent Love – Directed by Marek Kozakewicz	**Discovery of the Year**: **Damian Kocur – Bread and Salt (Directing)**‡; Daniel Jaroszek – Johnny (Directing); Damian Kocur – Bread and Salt (Screenplay); Jakub Skoczeń – The Christening (Directing); Aleksandra Terpińska – Other People (Directing)
**Audience Award**: **Johnny – Directed by Daniel Jaroszek**	**Life Achievement Award**: **Jan A. P. Kaczmarek**

=== Films with multiple nominations and awards ===
Films that received multiple nominations
Nominations	Film
11	EO
8	Johnny
7	The Christening
7	The Silent Twins
6	Backwards
6	Below the Surface
6	Bread and Salt
6	Other People
5	Broad Peak
5	March 1968
5	Woman on the Roof
4	It Came from the Water
2	Brigitte Bardot Forever
2	Fucking Bornholm

Films that received multiple awards
Awards	Film
6	EO
4	Johnny
2	Below the Surface
