= Polish Academy Award for Best Film =

Award from the Polish Film Academy

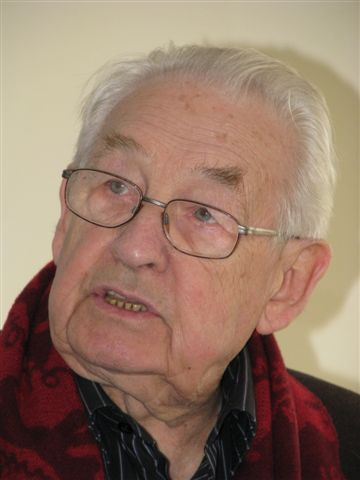
Andrzej Wajda (1926–2016), winner in 2008

Polish Academy Award for Best Film is one of the awards given to the best Polish motion picture.

== Winners and nominees ==
Year	Film	Director
1999	Historia kina w Popielawach	Jan Jakub Kolski
1999	Zabić Sekala	Vladimír Michálek
1999	Nic	Dorota Kędzierzawska
1999	Kroniki domowe	Leszek Wosiewicz
1999	Farba	Michał Rosa
2000	Dług	Krzysztof Krauze
2000	Wojaczek	Lech Majewski
2000	Ogniem i mieczem	Jerzy Hoffman
2000	Pan Tadeusz	Andrzej Wajda
2000	Tydzień z życia mężczyzny	Jerzy Stuhr
2001	Życie jako śmiertelna choroba przenoszona drogą płciową	Krzysztof Zanussi
2001	Prymas. Trzy lata z tysiąca	Teresa Kotlarczyk
2001	Daleko od okna	Jan Jakub Kolski
2001	Wrota Europy	Jerzy Wójcik
2001	Duże zwierzę	Jerzy Stuhr
2002	Cześć Tereska	Robert Gliński
2002	Angelus	Lech Majewski
2002	Boże skrawki	Yurek Bogayevicz
2002	Requiem	Witold Leszczyński
2002	Weiser	Wojciech Marczewski
2003	Pianista	Roman Polański
2003	Edi	Piotr Trzaskalski
2003	Tam i z powrotem	Wojciech Wójcik
2003	Dzień świra	Marek Koterski
2003	Anioł w Krakowie	Artur Więcek
2004	Zmruż oczy	Andrzej Jakimowski
2004	Żurek	Ryszard Brylski
2004	Pornografia	Jan Jakub Kolski
2005	Wesele	Wojciech Smarzowski
2005	Mój Nikifor	Krzysztof Krauze
2005	Pręgi	Magdalena Piekorz
2006	Komornik	Feliks Falk
2006	Jestem	Dorota Kędzierzawska
2006	Persona Non Grata	Krzysztof Zanussi
2007	Plac Zbawiciela	Krzysztof Krauze
2007	Jaśminum	Jan Jakub Kolski
2007	Wszyscy jesteśmy Chrystusami	Marek Koterski
2008	Katyń	Andrzej Wajda
2008	Sztuczki	Andrzej Jakimowski
2008	Pora umierać	Dorota Kędzierzawska
2009	33 sceny z życia	Małgorzata Szumowska
2009	Cztery noce z Anną	Jerzy Skolimowski
2009	Mała Moskwa	Waldemar Krzystek
2010	Rewers	Borys Lankosz
2010	Wojna polsko-ruska	Xawery Żuławski
2010	Dom zły	Wojciech Smarzowski
2011	Essential Killing	Jerzy Skolimowski
2011	Różyczka	Jan Kidawa-Błoński
2011	Wszystko, co kocham	Jacek Borcuch
2012	Róża	Wojciech Smarzowski
2012	W ciemności	Agnieszka Holland
2012	Sala Samobójców	Jan Komasa
2013	Obława	Marcin Krzyształowicz
2013	Jesteś Bogiem	Leszek Dawid
2013	Pokłosie	Władysław Pasikowski
2014	Ida	Paweł Pawlikowski
2014	Imagine	Andrzej Jakimowski
2014	Chce się żyć	Maciej Pieprzyca
2015	Bogowie	Łukasz Palkowski
2015	Jack Strong	Władysław Pasikowski
2015	Miasto 44	Jan Komasa
2016	Body/Ciało	Małgorzata Szumowska
2016	Moje córki krowy	Kinga Dębska
2016	Excentrycy, czyli po slonecznej stronie ulicy	Janusz Majewski
2017	Wołyń	Wojciech Smarzowski
2017	Ostatnia rodzina	Jan P. Matuszyński
2017	Jestem mordercą	Maciej Pieprzyca
2018	Cicha noc	Piotr Domalewski
2018	Twój Vincent	Dorota Kobiela
2018	Pokot	Agnieszka Holland
2019	Zimna Wojna	Paweł Pawlikowski
2019	Kler	Wojciech Smarzowski
2019	Kamerdyner	Filip Bajon
2020	Boże Ciało	Jan Komasa
2020	Pan T.	Marcin Kryształowicz
2020	Supernova	Bartosz Kruhlik
2020	Obywatel Jones	Agnieszka Holland
2020	Ikar. Legenda Mietka Kosza	Maciej Pieprzyca
2021	Zabij to i wyjedź z tego miasta	Mariusz Wilczyński
2021	Szarlatan	Agnieszka Holland
2021	Sala samobójców. Hejter	Jan Komasa
2021	25 lat niewinności. Sprawa Tomka Komendy	Jan Holoubek
2021	Jak najdalej stąd	Piotr Domalewski
2022	Quo Vadis, Aida?	Jasmila Žbanić
2022	My Wonderful Life	Łukasz Grzegorzek
2022	Żeby nie było śladów	Jan P. Matuszyński
2022	Wszystkie nasze strachy	Łukasz Gutt; Łukasz Ronduda
2022	Wesele	Wojtek Smarzowski
2023	EO	Jerzy Skolimowski
2023	The Silent Twins	Agnieszka Smoczyńska
2023	Kobieta na dachu	Anna Jadowska
2023	Johnny	Daniel Jaroszek
2023	Chleb i sól	Damian Kocur
2024	Zielona Granica	Agnieszka Holland
2024	Doppelgänger. Sobowtór	Jan Holoubek
2024	Scarborn	Paweł Maślona
2024	Filip	Michał Kwieciński
2024	Chłopi	Dorota Kobiela; Hugh Welchman
2025	Dziewczyna z igłą	Magnus von Horn
2025	Biała odwaga	Marcin Koszałka
2025	Kulej. Dwie strony medalu	Xawery Żuławski
2025	Strefa interesów	Jonathan Glazer
2025	To nie mój film	Maria Zbąska
2026	Home Sweet Home	Wojciech Smarzowski
2026	The Altar Boys	Piotr Domalewski
2026	Brother	Maciej Sobieszczański
2026	Franz	Agnieszka Holland
2026	No Ghosts on Good Street	Emi Buchwald
