= Polish Academy Award for Discovery of the Year =

Annual Polish film award

The Polish Academy Award for Discovery of the Year has been awarded annually since 2008 by the Polish Film Academy. Award is given to the debutantes of Polish cinema, who are candidates to the Polish Academy Award for first time.

== Winners and nominees ==
=== 2000s ===
Year	Nominee(s)	Film	Polish title	Ref.
2008 (10th)	Sonia Bohosiewicz (acting)	Preserve	Rezerwat	
2008 (10th)	Łukasz Palkowski (directing)	Preserve	Rezerwat	
2008 (10th)	Damian Ul (acting)	Tricks	Sztuczki	
2009 (9th)	Elena Leszczyńska (acting)	Little Moscow	Mała Moskwa	
2009 (9th)	Adam Guziński (directing)	The Boy on the Galloping Horse	Chłopiec na galopującym koniu	
2009 (9th)	Marieta Żukowska (acting)	The Unmoved Mover	Nieruchomy poruszyciel	

=== 2010s ===
Year	Nominee(s)	English title	Polish title	Ref.
2010 (12th)	Borys Lankosz (directing)	The Reverse	Rewers	
2010 (12th)	Katarzyna Rosłaniec (directing)	Mall Girls	Galerianki	
2010 (12th)	Paweł Borowski (directing)	Zero		
2011 (13th)	Mateusz Kościukiewicz (acting)	All That I Love	Wszystko co kocham	
2011 (13th)	Piotr Dumała (directing)	The Forest	Las	
2011 (13th)	Arkadiusz Jakubik (directing)	The Simple Story About Love	Prosta historia o miłości	
2012 (14th)	Jan Komasa (directing)	Suicide Room	Sala samobójców	
2012 (14th)	Adrian Panek (directing)	Daas		
2012 (14th)	Leszek Dawid (directing)	My Name Is Ki	Ki	
2013 (15th)	Michał Urbaniak (acting)	My Father's Bike	Mój rower	
2013 (15th)	Marcin Kowalczyk (acting)	You Are God	Jesteś Bogiem	
2013 (15th)	Bartosz Konopka (directing)	Fear of Falling	Obława	
2014 (16th)	Bodo Kox (directing)	The Girl from the Wardrobe	Dziewczyna z szafy	
2014 (16th)	Agata Trzebuchowska (acting)	Ida		
2014 (16th)	Łukasz Żal (cinematography)	Ida		
2015 (17th)	Zofia Wichłacz (acting)	Warsaw 44	Miasto 44	
2015 (17th)	Ewa Gronowska (costume design)	Gods	Bogowie	
2015 (17th)	Kacper Fertacz (cinematography)	Hardkor Disko		
2016 (18th)	Agnieszka Smoczyńska (directing)	The Lure	Córki dancingu	
2016 (18th)	Justyna Suwała (acting)	Body	Body/Ciało	
2016 (18th)	Magnus von Horn (directing)	The Here After	Intruz	
2017 (19th)	Jan P. Matuszyński (directing)	The Last Family	Ostatnia rodzina	
2017 (19th)	Anna Zamecka (directing)	Communion	Komunia	
2017 (19th)	Michalina Łabacz (acting)	Hatred	Wołyń	
2018 (20th)	Piotr Domalewski (directing)	Silent Night	Cicha noc	
2018 (20th)	Bronisława Zamachowska (acting)	Afterimage	Powidoki	
2018 (20th)	Dorota Kobiela (directing); Hugh Welchman (directing)	Loving Vincent	Twój Vincent	
2019 (21st)	Gabriela Muskała (writing)	Fugue	Fuga	
2019 (21st)	Paweł Maślona (directing)	Panic Attack	Atak paniki	
2019 (21st)	Jagoda Szelc (directing)	Tower. A Bright Day	Wieża. Jasny dzień	

=== 2020s ===
Year	Nominee(s)	English title	Polish title	Ref.
2020 (22nd)	Mateusz Pacewicz (writing)	Corpus Christi	Boże Ciało	
2020 (22nd)	Cyprian Grabowski (acting)	Icarus. The Legend of Mietek Kosz	Ikar. Legenda Mietka Kosza	
2020 (22nd)	Bartosz Kruhlik (directing)	Supernova		
2020 (22nd)	Bartosz Kruhlik (writing)	Supernova		
2020 (22nd)	Łukasz Kośmicki (directing)	The Coldest Game	Ukryta gra	
2021 (23rd)	Jan Holoubek (directing)	25 Years of Innocence. The Case of Tomek Komenda	25 lat niewinności. Sprawa Tomka Komendy	
2021 (23rd)	Zofia Stafiej (acting)	I Never Cry	Jak najdalej stąd	
2021 (23rd)	Zofia Domalik (acting)	All for My Mother	Wszystko dla mojej matki	
2021 (23rd)	Mariusz Wilczyński (directing)	Kill It and Leave This Town	Zabij to i wyjedź z tego miasta	
2021 (23rd)	Mariusz Wilczyński (writing)	Kill It and Leave This Town	Zabij to i wyjedź z tego miasta	
2022 (24th)	Łukasz Gutt (directing)	All Our Fears	Wszystkie nasze strachy	
2022 (24th)	Iwona Siekierzyńska (directing)	Amateurs	Amatorzy	
2022 (24th)	Mateusz Rakowicz (directing)	The Getaway King	Najmro. Kocha, kradnie, szanuje	
2022 (24th)	Mateusz Kudła (directing); Anna Kokoszka-Romer (directing)	Polański, Horowitz. Hometown		
2022 (24th)	Jakub Michalczuk (directing)	The In-Laws	Teściowie	
2023 (25th)	Damian Kocur (directing)	Bread and Salt	Chleb i sól	
2023 (25th)	Damian Kocur (writing)	Bread and Salt	Chleb i sól	
2023 (25th)	Jakub Skoczeń (directing)	The Christening	Chrzciny	
2023 (25th)	Aleksandra Terpińska (directing)	Other People	Inni ludzie	
2023 (25th)	Daniel Jaroszek (directing)	Johnny		
2024 (26th)	Grzegorz Dębowski (directing)	Next to Nothing	Tyle co nic	
2024 (26th)	Łukasz “L.U.C.” Rostkowski (music)	The Peasants	Chłopi	
2024 (26th)	Kamila Urzędowska (acting)	The Peasants	Chłopi	
2024 (26th)	Michał Kwieciński (writing)	Filip		
2024 (26th)	Michał A. Zieliński (writing)	Scarborn	Kos	
2025 (27th)	Maria Zbąska (directing)	It's Not My Film	To nie mój film	
2025 (27th)	Gabriela Muskała (directing)	The Clowns	Błazny	
2025 (27th)	Frederike Hoffmeier (music)	The Girl with the Needle	Dziewczyna z igłą	
2025 (27th)	Kamila Tarabura (directing)	Travel Essentials	Rzeczy niezbędne	
2025 (27th)	Tomasz Gąssowski (directing)	Sparrow	Wróbel	
2026 (28th)	Emi Buchwald (directing)	No Ghosts on Good Street	Nie ma duchów w mieszkaniu na Dobrej	
2026 (28th)	Iga Lis (directing)	The Queen and the Smokehouse	Bałtyk	
2026 (28th)	Filip Wiłkomirski (acting)	Brother	Brat	
2026 (28th)	Kordian Kądziela (directing)	LARP	LARP. Miłość, trolle i inne questy	
2026 (28th)	Tobiasz Wajda (acting)	The Altar Boys	Ministranci	
