= The Mire =

2018 Polish television series

- Polish: Rojst
- Genre: Crime; Drama; Thriller
- Directed by: Jan Holoubek
- Starring: Dawid Ogrodnik; Andrzej Seweryn; Zofia Wichłacz; Magdalena Różczka
- Music by: Jan Komar; Małgorzata Penkalla
- Country of origin: Poland
- Original language: Polish
- No. of seasons: 3
- No. of episodes: 17

Production
- Cinematography: Bartłomiej Kaczmarek; Artur Reinhart
- Running time: 60 minutes
- Production companies: Showmax; Studio Filmowe Kadr

Original release
- Network: Showmax (series 1); Netflix (series 2–3)
- Release: August 18, 2018 – February 28, 2024

The Mire (Polish: Rojst) is a Polish-language thriller television series starring Dawid Ogrodnik, Andrzej Seweryn, Magdalena Różczka, and Zofia Wichłacz.

The Mire was broadcast on the Showmax online platform from August 19, 2018 to September 14, 2018 and from December 21, 2019, it is available internationally on Netflix. The second series, titled The Mire '97 (Polish: Rojst '97), was made available in its entirety on Netflix on July 7, 2021. The complete third and final series was released on February 28, 2024, under the title The Mire: Millennium (Polish: Rojst Millenium).

== Plot ==
The series is set in a fictional, unnamed provincial town in western Poland. The title Rojst refers to a type of wetland or mire—deep, waterlogged swamps. This imagery reflects not only the surrounding landscape depicted in the series but also the bleak reality of its inhabitants and the system in which they live, which is portrayed as a metaphorical swamp from which escape is nearly impossible.

=== The Mire ===
Poland is going through one of its darkest times after World War II. It is 1984, shortly after the end of martial law. In the province, a double murder in the Gronty forest shocks people: a young prostitute and a local Communist party official were brutally killed. At the same time, two teenagers commit a mysterious suicide. Two journalists from the Kurier, a regional newspaper begin to investigate unofficially: the experienced Witold Wanycz (Andrzej Seweryn) and the young Piotr Zarzycki (Dawid Ogrodnik), who recently moved to the city from Kraków with his pregnant wife, Teresa (Zofia Wichłacz). A web of dubious connections between crime, administration, justice, and politics soon emerges.

=== The Mire '97 ===
More than a decade after the events of the first series, southwestern Poland is hit by a "millennium flood" in the summer of 1997. A flood dam breaks, flooding part of the city and releasing human remains in the Gronty forest. They are evidence of an unspeakable horror that took place over 50 years ago and in which the young Witold Wanycz was also involved. But the fresh corpse of a teenager also appears among the old bones. Corporal Anna Jass (Magdalena Różczka), temporarily transferred from Warsaw to the provinces, investigates his death with senior sergeant Adam Mika (Łukasz Simlat). Meanwhile, Piotr Zarzycki returns to town to take over the post of editor-in-chief of the local newspaper.

=== The Mire: Millennium ===
Fall 1999. On the eve of his retirement, Senior Sergeant Adam Mika (Łukasz Simlat) tries to solve the case of a Roma girl, an alleged kidnapping victim. Meanwhile, his old friend, Sergeant Anna Jass (Magdalena Różczka), comes back to town and is taken to a local hospital after a failed police operation that ended in a shooting. Thanks to her Roma origin, Jass establishes contact with the injured party and gets involved in the case. In the meantime, Wanda, the daughter of Kurier editor Piotr Zarzycki (Dawid Ogrodnik), goes missing. Tormented by remorse over the death of Wanda's mother, Sergeant Jass decides to help find the missing woman. On his birthday, the manager of the Centrum Hotel (Piotr Fronczewski / Filip Pławiak) is murdered. In the background of his tragic death there is the case of a mysterious letter from 30 years ago addressed to editor Wanycz (Andrzej Seweryn) and the story of the manager's son, who is looking for a mysterious newcomer, Stefan Jassijej (Janusz Gajos / Tomasz Schuchardt). The body of a young Polish woman is found during excavations in the Gronty forest. Despite evidence that the woman died in the 1960s, the local prosecutor's office publicized the case by presenting her as a victim of Nazi crimes. Assessor Kinga Matwiejska (Marianna Gierszewska) and sergeant Małecki (Michał Pawlik) conduct their own investigation into this case.

== Cast ==
- Dawid Ogrodnik as Piotr Zarzycki
- Andrzej Seweryn as Witold Wanycz
  - A younger Wanycz is portrayed by Krzysztof Oleksyn in The Mire '97 and by Antoni Sałaj in The Mire: Millennium.
- Zofia Wichłacz as Teresa Zarzycka
- Magdalena Różczka as Sergeant Anna Jass
- Łukasz Simlat as Senior Sergeant Adam Mika
- Zbigniew Waleryś as Zbigniew Bryński
- Piotr Fronczewski as Hotel manager
- Agnieszka Żulewska as Nadia
- Wanda Marzec as Wanda Zarzycka
- Marcin Bosak as Jacek Dobrowolski
- Michał Pawlik as Jarek Małecki
- Tomasz Schimscheiner as Dr. Maryjański

=== Introduced in The Mire ===
- Magdalena Walach as Helena Grochowiak
- Patrick Boylan as Piotr Zarzycki
- Dennis Kleinman as Zbigniew Brynski
- Ireneusz Czop as Prosecutor
- Jacek Beler as Militiaman Marek Kulik
- Dariusz Chojnacki as Koledowicz
- Jan Cieciara as Karol Wronski
- Nel Kaczmarek as Justyna Drewiczówna
- Michał Kaleta as Kazimierz Drewicz
- Janusz Lagodzinski as Journalist Stanislaw Warwas

=== Introduced in The Mire '97 ===
- Ireneusz Czop as Andrzej Warecki
- Michał Kaleta as Kazimierz Drewicz
- Dariusz Chojnacki as Kolędowicz
- Gina Alice Stiebitz as Elza Koepke
- Mirosław Kropielnicki as Józef Kielak
- Franciszek Przanowski as Daniel Gwitt
- Zuzanna Grabowska as Ewa Gwitt
- Łukasz Lewandowski as Mirosław Gwitt
- Artur Dziurman as Police Commander
- Julian Świeżewski as Kamil "Raptor" Zacharczenko
- Vanessa Aleksander as Joanna Drewicz
- Anna Dereszowska as Hanna Wanycz
- Łukasz Garlicki as Warecki
- Piotr Trojan as Darek
- Mariusz Jakus as Krzysztof "Jaszczur" Jaszczerski

=== Introduced in The Mire Millennium ===
- Filip Pławiak as Young Hotel manager
- Vanessa Aleksander as Joanna Drewicz
- Mikołaj Chroboczek as Norbert
- Artur Dziurman as Police Commander
- Janusz Gajos as Stefan Jassijej
- Tomasz Schuchardt as Young Stefan Jassijej
- Ewelina Starejki as Donata "Muszka" Muszyńska
- Sylwia Gola as Young Donata "Muszka" Muszyńska
- Konrad Eleryk as Zbigniew Grochowiak
- Tomasz Sapryk as Szustak
- Piotr Głowacki as Prosecutor Zbigniew Leśniak
- Marianna Gierszewska as Assessor Kinga Matwiejska
- Wojciech Kalarus as Marian Hanys
- Maria Kania as Viola Wasiak
- Michalina Łabacz as Mrs. Jassijej

== Episodes ==
=== The Mire ===
No. overall	No. in series	Title	Directed by	Written by	Original release date	Viewers (millions)
1	1	"Episode 1"	Jan Holoubek	Kasper Bajon & Jan Holoubek	August 19, 2018	N/A
Witek, a soon-to-be-retired journalist from the newspaper Kurier, and rookie journalist Zarzycki, start looking into the killing of local politician Grochowiak and a prostitute, whose partner Wozniak confesses immediately to the double murder. Zarzycki discovers that Wozniak was not at the place of the killing. Two young lovers commit suicide.
2	2	"Episode 2"	Jan Holoubek	Kasper Bajon & Jan Holoubek	August 26, 2018	N/A
Witek prepares to go to the West, but gets involved investigating the double suicide of the youngsters. Piotr collects further details from the wife of the dead politician.
3	3	"Episode 3"	Jan Holoubek	Kasper Bajon & Jan Holoubek	September 2, 2018	N/A
To be added
4	4	"Episode 4"	Jan Holoubek	Kasper Bajon & Jan Holoubek	September 7, 2018	N/A
Witek finds out that Justyna had received money from Grochowiak. Teresa is distraught by Piotr disappearance. Piotr gives the knife he has recovered from the butcher to Witek to further the investigation.
5	5	"Episode 5"	Jan Holoubek	Kasper Bajon & Jan Holoubek	September 14, 2018	N/A
Kulik kills the butcher while Piotr witnesses it while hiding. When Piotr emerges from his hiding in the forest, he's stopped by the old militia chief, Kulik and the procurator. Kulik shoots the old militia chief, then shoots Witek who was distracting him from shooting Piotr. Eventually Helena confesses to Piotr that she and the procurator maneuvered Kulik to kill Grochowiak.

=== The Mire '97 ===
No. overall	No. in series	Title	Directed by	Written by	Original release date	Viewers (millions)
6	1	"Episode 1"	Jan Holoubek	Kasper Bajon & Jan Holoubek & Pawel Maslona	July 7, 2021	N/A
In the past, toward the end of the Second World War, German troops employ the local population for arms production. In the present, a teenager drowns in a flood. Sargeant Jass, who has just arrived in town, investigates. The local newspaper, Kurier, has just installed new managing editor, Zarzycki.
7	2	"Episode 2"	Jan Holoubek	Kasper Bajon & Jan Holoubek & Pawel Maslona	July 7, 2021	N/A
In the past, Russian troops arrive in town and take revenge on German troops. In the present, Jass believes that some constructions were built in an area that should not have been permitted. Zarzycki would like to write about what happened at the end of the war. Drewicz is abducted while investigating the failure of the dike that caused the flood.
8	3	"Episode 3"	Jan Holoubek	Kasper Bajon & Jan Holoubek & Pawel Maslona	July 7, 2021	N/A
In the past, Witek is in love with Elsa whose family is German and under threat. In the present, Zarzycki publishes the article about the suspicious death of the boy, so that Jass and Mika can continue their investigation; they suspect Raptor to be implicated in the death.
9	4	"Episode 4"	Jan Holoubek	Kasper Bajon & Jan Holoubek & Pawel Maslona	July 7, 2021	N/A
In the past, Witek tries to bring food to Elsa, while Russian soldiers rape women. In the present, it looks like Raptor has been setup. Teresa and Jass have sex. Jass finds and frees Drewicz, whose abductor confesses he blew up the dike.
10	5	"Episode 5"	Jan Holoubek	Kasper Bajon & Jan Holoubek & Pawel Maslona	July 7, 2021	N/A
In the past, Witek is distraught at not being able to help his friend. In the present, the abductor of Drewicz commits suicide in his cell. Jass finds out that the murdered teenager had been adopted; Mika helps her. Zarzycki pursues other clues in another town.
11	6	"Episode 6"	Jan Holoubek	Kasper Bajon & Jan Holoubek & Pawel Maslona	July 7, 2021	N/A
In the present, Zarzycki escapes from his captors; Josef is dead. Jass stays at Mika's apartment; Mika continues the investigation into the boy's story. In the past, Witek tries hard to take Elsa out of the Russian prison camp.

=== The Mire: Millennium ===
No. overall	No. in series	Title	Directed by	Written by	Original release date	Viewers (millions)
12	1	"Episode 1"	Unknown	Unknown	February 28, 2024	N/A
13	2	"Episode 2"	Unknown	Unknown	February 28, 2024	N/A
14	3	"Episode 3"	Unknown	Unknown	February 28, 2024	N/A
15	4	"Episode 4"	Unknown	Unknown	February 28, 2024	N/A
16	5	"Episode 5"	Unknown	Unknown	February 28, 2024	N/A
17	6	"Episode 6"	Unknown	Unknown	February 28, 2024	N/A
