= Bread and salt (disambiguation) =

Bread and salt is a welcoming ceremony in many cultures.

Bread and salt may also refer to:

- Leb i sol (translated as "Bread and Salt"), a Macedonian jazz band
- Bread and Salt, a 1949 film with Widad Hamdi
- Bread and Salt (film), a 2022 film by Damian Kocur
- Bread and Salt, a 2020 collection of stories by Valerie Miner
