= Zofia Stafiej =

Polish actress (born 1999)

- Born: 21 June 1999 (age 26); Warsaw, Poland
- Occupation: Actress

Zofia Stafiej (born June 21, 1999 in Warsaw) is a Polish film actress.

She won the award for acting debut at the 45th Gdynia Film Festival (2020) for the main role of Olya in the film Jak najdalej stąd (I Never Cry) (2020) directed by Piotr Domalewski. She was also nominated for the 2021 Polish Film Award in two categories: Best Actress and Discovery of the Year. She also appeared in the film 25 lat niewinności (2020) directed by Jan Holoubek.

She is a student of the Acting Department of the Łódź Film School.
