= Broad Peak (film) =

2022 Polish film by Leszek Dawid

- Polish Netflix poster
- Directed by: Leszek Dawid
- Written by: Łukasz Ludkowski
- Starring: Ireneusz Czop; Maja Ostaszewska; Dawid Ogrodnik; Łukasz Simlat; Piotr Głowacki; Tomasz Sapryk; Maciej Raniszewski; Maciej Kulig
- Cinematography: Łukasz Gutt
- Edited by: Maciej Pawlinski
- Music by: Łukasz Targosz
- Production company: East Studio
- Distributed by: Netflix
- Release date: 14 September 2022
- Running time: 102 minutes
- Country: Poland
- Language: Polish
- Budget: $4.3 million

Broad Peak is a 2022 Polish biographical adventure drama film directed by Leszek Dawid. The film centers on Maciej Berbeka, a Polish mountaineer, and his attempts to complete the first-ever winter ascent of Broad Peak, an eight-thousander in the Karakoram. It was released on Netflix on 14 September 2022.

== Plot ==
In March 1988, a Polish climbing team in the Pakistan struggles on their expedition to the second highest eight-thousander, K2. Two of its climbers, Maciej Berbeka and Aleksander Lwow, decide to attempt the first winter ascent and first alpine style ascent of a neighboring eight-thousander, Broad Peak, despite the protests of their leader, Andrzej Zawada.

The men depart from their base camp on Baltoro Glacier and begin their ascent. A blizzard hits, and Zawada urges them to return if the storm doesn't let up. The next day, the men begin their summit push, but Lwow sees inclement weather approaching and wants to turn around. Berbeka, however, is determined to keep climbing. Alone, he climbs until he reaches the death zone. The team radios him with no response until Berbeka finally answers and tells them that he reached the summit. The descent is difficult, but Berbeka reaches base camp and is airlifted for medical care. He receives accolades and mainstream fame in his native Poland but also struggles with traumatic flashbacks from the climb.

Three months later, Berbeka reads an article by Lwow and finds out that he didn't actually reach the summit of Broad Peak; he reached the Rocky Summit, 17 meters from the summit. Furious, Berbeka confronts Zawada, who tells him that the entire team wanted his safe return and knew that, had Berbeka known that he hadn't summited, he would've continued the dangerous ascent. The news breaks in Poland, and Berbeka withdraws from the mountaineering community.

24 years later, in June 2012, Krzysztof Wielicki tracks down Berbeka and tells him that he is organizing an expedition of Broad Peak and needs an experienced climber. Initially, Berbeka declines, but Wielicki insists that Berbeka deserves to finally conquer the mountain. The team—composed of Wielicki, Berbeka, Adam Bielecki, Tomasz Kowalski, and Artur Małek—travels to the Karakoram. On the summit push, Wielicki notifies the team that they are running behind schedule. The team reaches the Rocky Summit, but Wielicki tells them that they don't have enough daylight to finish the climb, and urges them to return. Despite Wielicki's warnings, on 5 March 2013, Berbeka and the other three mountaineers reach the summit and complete the first winter ascent of the mountain.

Before the credits roll, it is revealed that Berbeka and Kowalski died on their descent.

== Cast ==
- Ireneusz Czop as Maciej Berbeka
- Maja Ostaszewska as Ewa Dyakowska-Berbeka
- Tomasz Sapryk as Andrzej Zawada
- Łukasz Simlat as Krzysztof Wielicki
- Piotr Głowacki as Aleksander Lwow
- Dawid Ogrodnik as Adam Bielecki
- Maciej Raniszewski as Tomasz Kowalski
- Maciej Kulig as Artur Małek

== Production ==
Filming began in 2018 and took place in the Karakoram in Pakistan and in the Italian Alps. In Pakistan, 250 sherpas were needed to transport three-and-a-half tons of filming equipment. The 21-person crew then trekked for six days in the mountains to get to their base camp for filming.

== Reception ==
John Sooja of Common Sense Media gave the film two out of five stars, noting that some of the film's drama felt "forced" and writing, "It's much to do about a conquest that seems selfish. If this real-life story is more than that, this movie doesn't show it." Marshall Shaffer of Decider noted that Maja Ostaszewska's performance "is the closest thing Broad Peak has to an emotional core."

=== Awards and nominations ===
Year	Award	Category	Recipient(s)	Result	Ref.
2022	Camerimage	Golden Frog	Łukasz Gutt and Leszek Dawid	Nominated	
2022	Polish Film Festival	Golden Lion	Leszek Dawid, Maciej Rzaczynski, and Dawid Janicki	Nominated	
2023	Polish Film Awards	Best Actor	Ireneusz Czop	Nominated	
2023	Polish Film Awards	Best Supporting Actress	Maja Ostaszewska	Nominated	
2023	Polish Film Awards	Best Cinematography	Łukasz Gutt	Nominated	
2023	Polish Film Awards	Best Costume Design	Agata Culak	Nominated	
2023	Polish Film Awards	Best Makeup	Katarzyna Wilk	Nominated	
