= 1997 Central European flood =

July 1997 Oder River flood

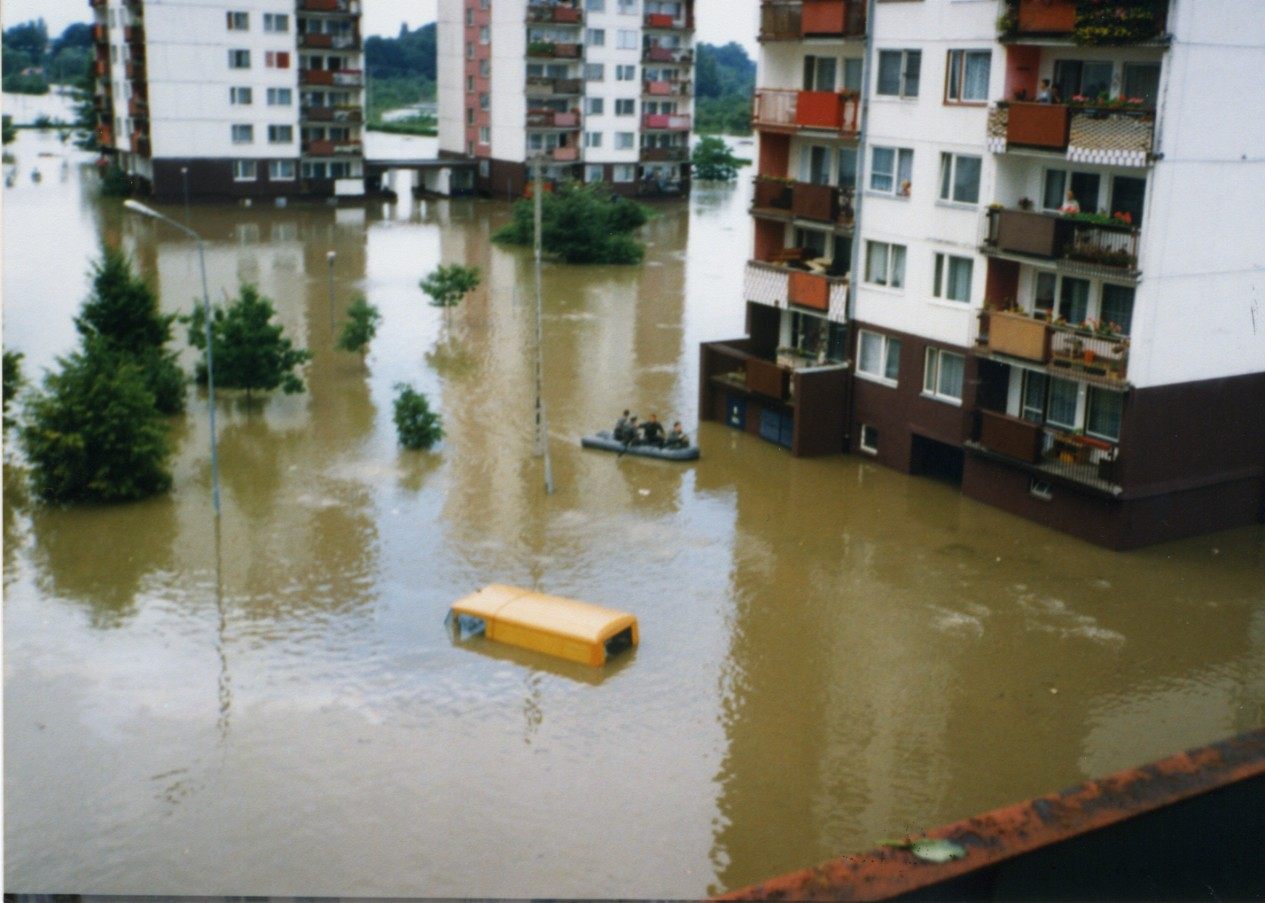
- Kozanów residential district in Wrocław, Poland during the flooding

Meteorological history
- Duration: July 1997

Overall effects
- Fatalities: 114 (56 in Poland, 50 in the Czech Republic)
- Damage: $4.5 billion
- Areas affected: Czech Republic, Poland, Germany

The 1997 Central European flood or the 1997 Oder Flood of the Oder and Morava river basins in July 1997 affected Poland, the Czech Republic and Germany, taking the lives of 114 people and causing material damages estimated at $4.5 billion (3.8 billion euros in the Czech Republic and Poland and 330 million euros in Germany). The flooding began in the Czech Republic, then spread to Poland and Germany. In Poland, where it was one of the most disastrous floods in the country's history, it was named the Millennium Flood (Powódź tysiąclecia). The term was also used in Germany (Jahrtausendflut). The event has also been referred to as the Great Flood of 1997.

== Causes ==
Animation of rainfall over Central Europe in July 1997

Southwestern Poland and the northeastern Czech Republic experienced two periods of extensive rainfall, first occurring 3–10 July and second 17–22 July. The precipitation was caused by a Genoa low pressure system, which moved from northern Italy to Moravia and Poland. The unusual development occurred when a field of higher air pressure between the Azores Islands and Scandinavia was blocked. The center of low pressure remained over southern Poland for a long period of time.

The precipitation was very high, measuring 300–600 millimetres (12–24 in), and corresponded to several months' average rainfall over a few days. Water levels rose 2–3 m (6 ft 7 in – 9 ft 10 in) above previously recorded averages and were so high that they caused the water to flow over existing measurement poles. It was one of the heaviest periods of rainfall in recorded history. It was dubbed the Millennium Flood because a likelihood of such a flood in a particular year was estimated at 0.1%, i.e. one event per thousand years.

== Floods ==
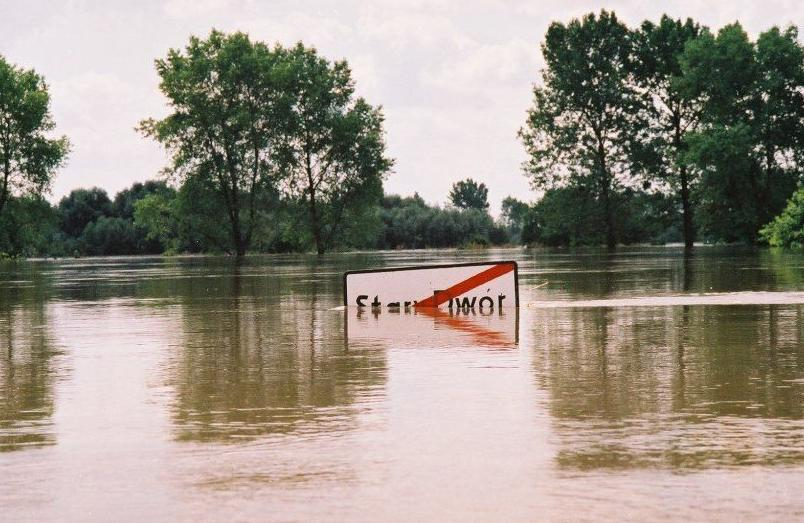
Exit sign from village of Stary Dwór, Wołów County, Poland

Flooding began on 5 July in the Czech Republic and spread to Poland on 6 July. Those early floods were very rapid flash floods (water levels rose by up to four meters in half a day). In Poland, the first settlements flooded were located around Prudnik and Głuchołazy, and were visited by Polish Prime Minister Włodzimierz Cimoszewicz on 7 July. Flooding spread rapidly from Chałupki to Racibórz. In Kłodzko several buildings dating back a few hundred years (kamienica) collapsed; on 8 July the flood reached Krapkowice. In the second stage of the flood, the flood wave flowed down through the Oder river, submerging successive towns in the area. Left-bank Opole was flooded on 10 July, Wrocław and Rybnik on 12 July, and Głogów soon after. The rising waters slowed by the time they reached the Polish-German border (the Oder-Neisse line), allowing more time for preparations; the damages were thus much lower.

On 18 July, Polish president Aleksander Kwaśniewski declared a day of national mourning.

== Water levels ==
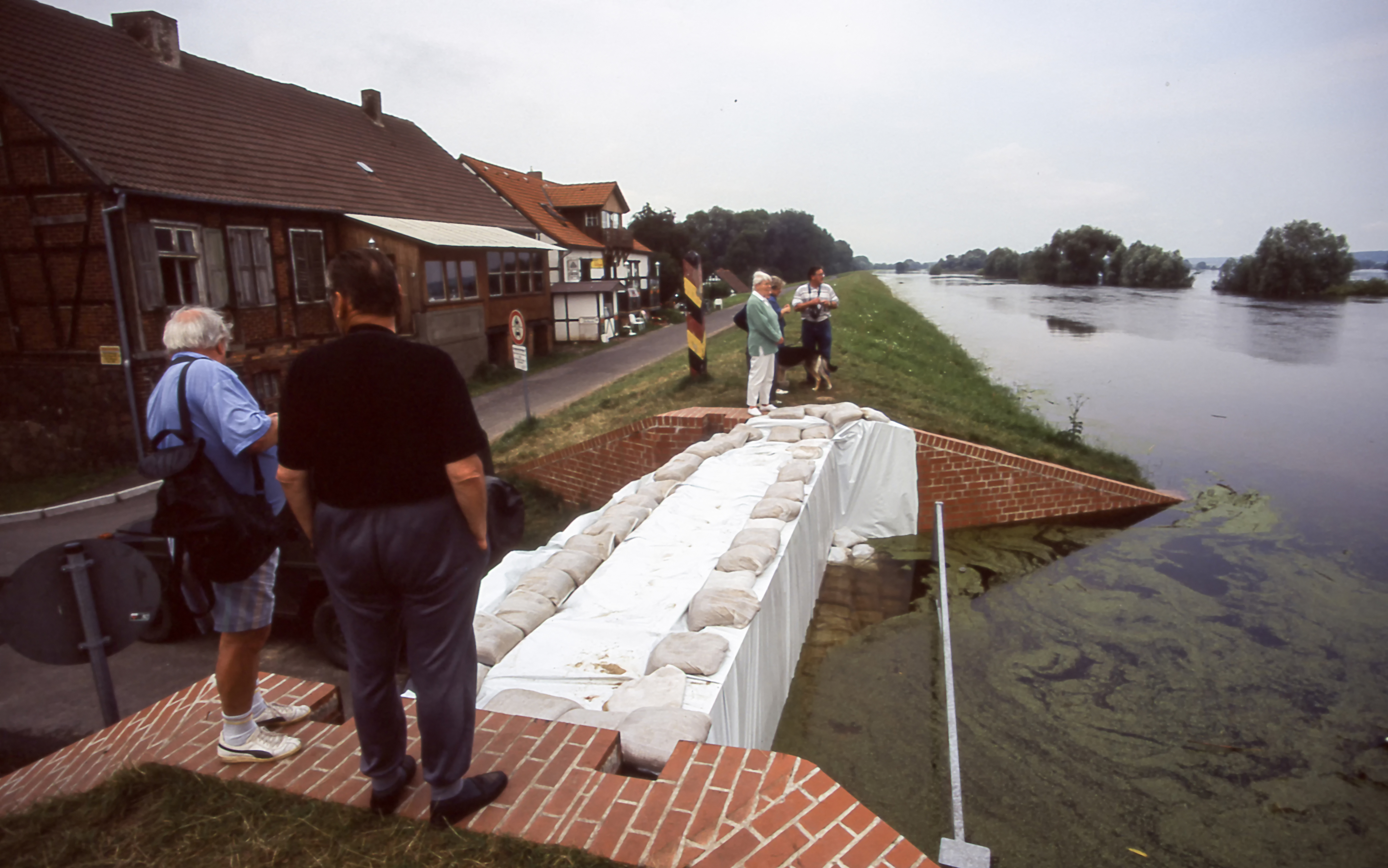
Zollbrücke, Germany

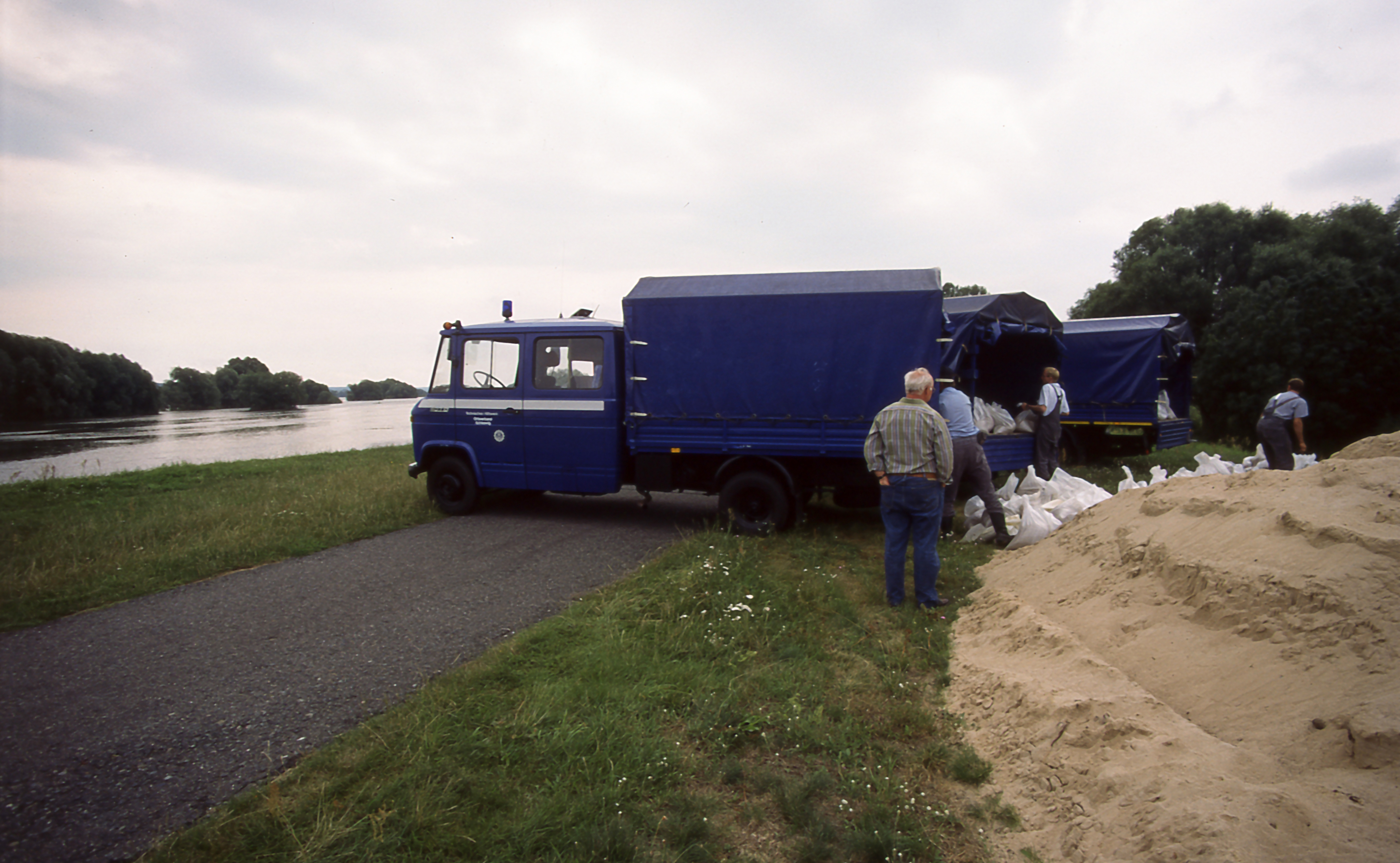
Hohensaaten, Germany

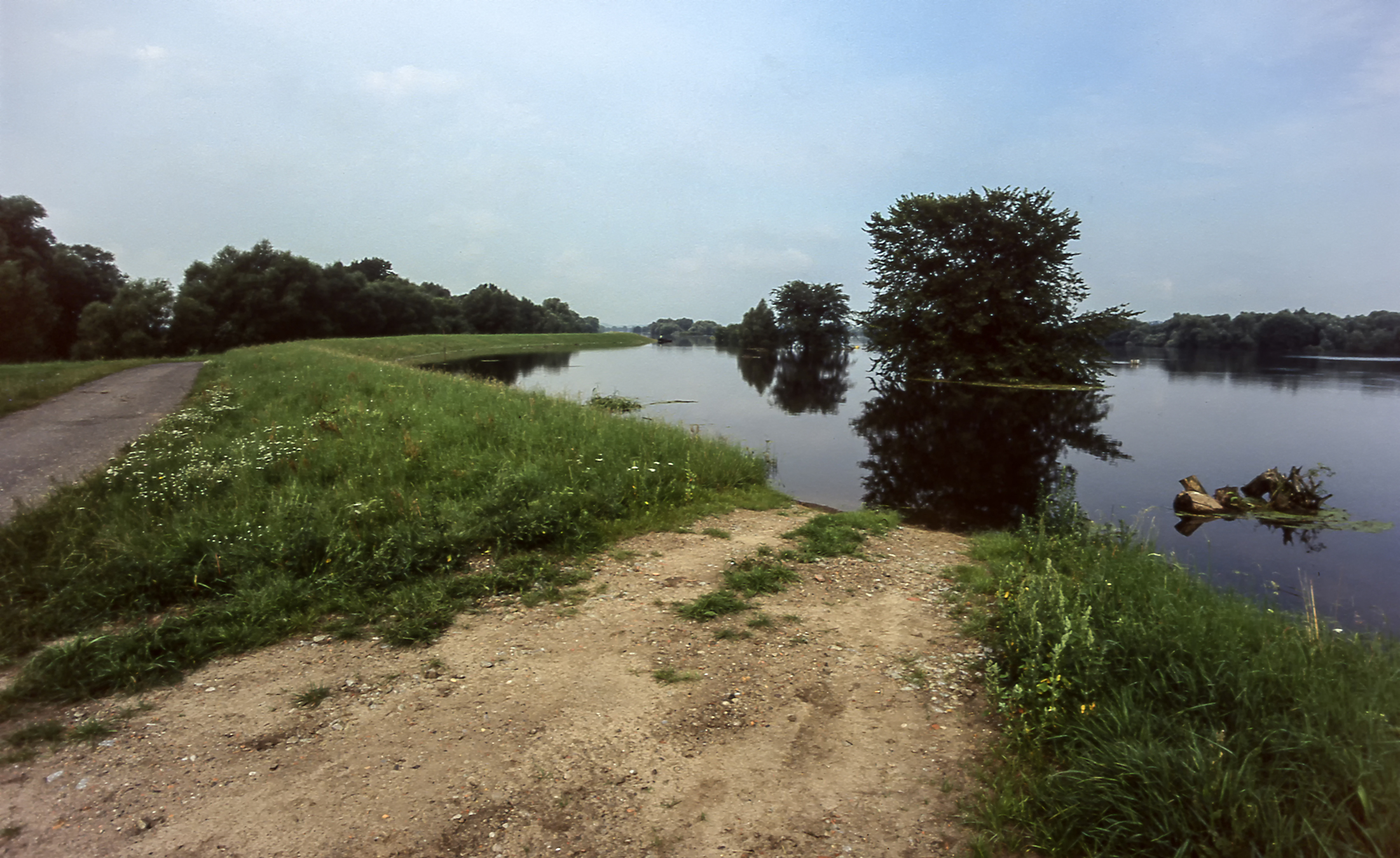
Hohenwutzen, Germany

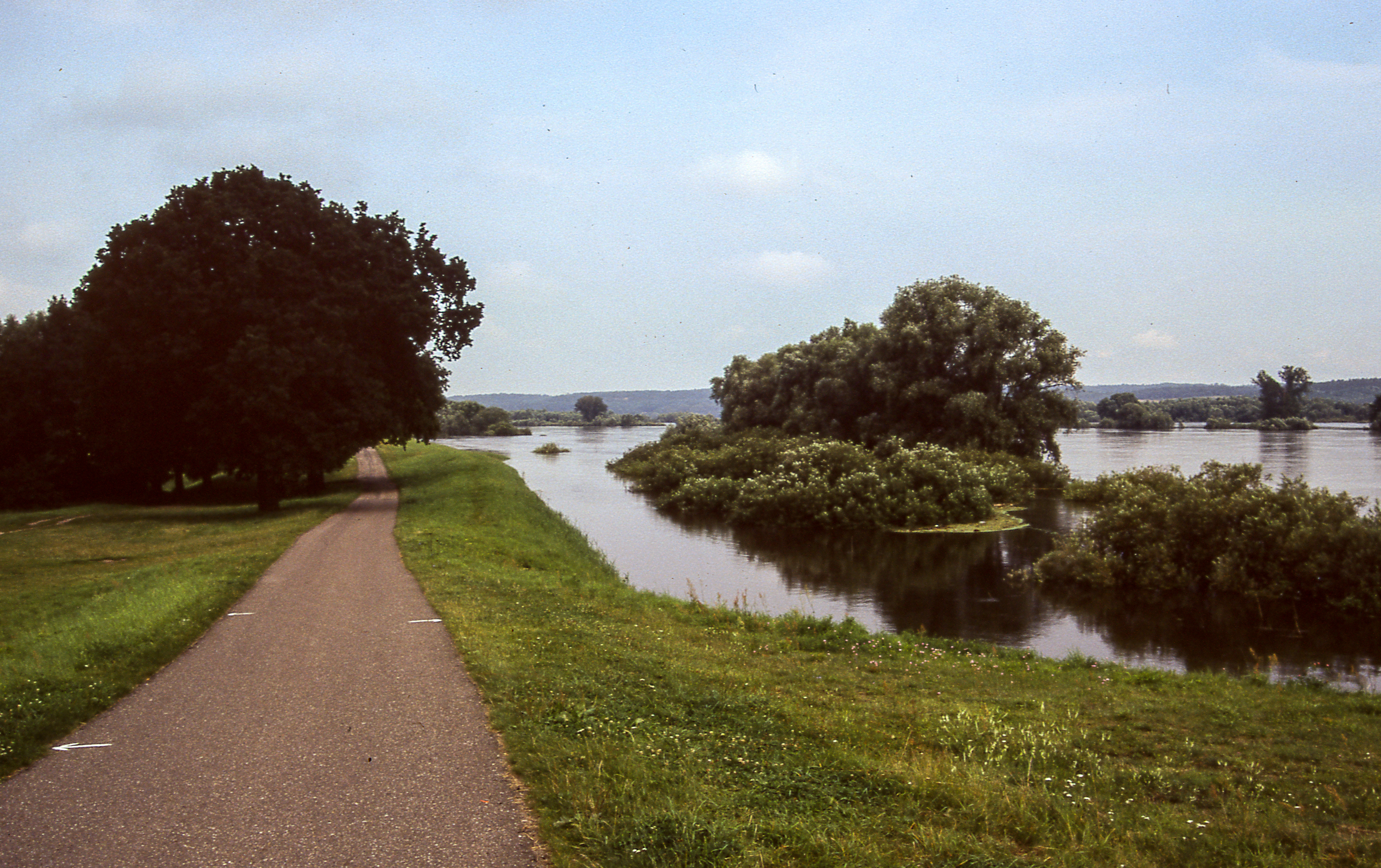
Siekierki, Poland

Water levels recorded on the Oder river in the flood period:

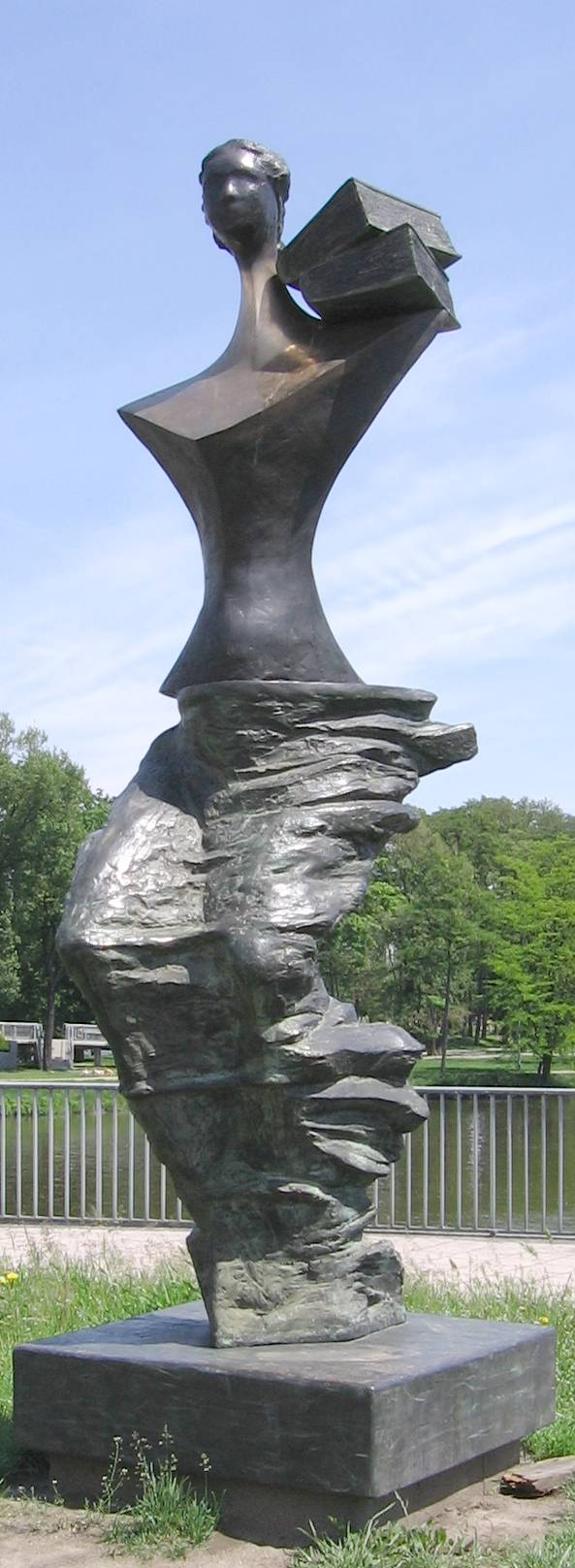
A memorial near University Bridge in Wrocław honors people who worked to save the city during the 1997 flood. It depicts a symbolic woman at the University Library, carrying all books from lower to upper floors.

Location	Oder-km	Maximum water level (cm)	Date
(Poland) Racibórz Miedonia	55.5	1045	9 July 1997
(Poland) Ujście Nysy	180.5	768	10 July 1997
(Poland) Rędzin	261.1	1030	13 July 1997
(Poland) Brzeg Dolny	284.7	970	13 – 14 July 1997
(Poland) Malczyce	304.8	792	14 – 15 July 1997
(Poland) Ścinawa	331.9	732	15 July 1997
(Poland) Głogów	392.9	712	16 July 1997
(Poland) Nowa Sól	429.8	681	16 July 1997
(Poland) Cigacice	471.3	682	19 July 1997
(Poland) Połęcko	530.3	595	24 July 1997
(Germany) Ratzdorf	542.5	691	24 July 1997
(Germany) Eisenhüttenstadt	554.1	717	24 July 1997
(Germany) Kienitz	633.0	628	24 July 1997
(Germany) Frankfurt/Oder	584.0	657-656	27 July 1997
(Poland) Słubice	584.1	637	27 July 1997
(Germany) Kietz	614.8	653	27 – 28 July 1997
(Germany) Stützkow	680.5	1009	29 July 1997
(Germany) Hohensaaten-Finow	664.9	729	31 July 1997
(Germany) Hohensaaten; Ostschleuse OP (Oderseite)	667.2	805	31 July 1997
(Poland) Gozdowice	645.3	659	31 July – 1 August 1997
(Poland) Bielinek	673.5	712	31 July – 1 August 1997
(Germany) Schwedt; Schleuse OP (Oderseite)	697.0	840	1 – 2 August 1997
(Germany) Gartz (Oder)	8.0	698	1 – 2 August 1997
(Germany) Schwedt Oderbrücke	690.6	886	2 August 1997
(Poland) Widuchowa	701.8	760	2 – 3 August 1997
(Germany) Mescherin	14.1	672	3 August 1997
(Poland) Gryfino	718.5	649	3 August 1997
(Germany) Ückermünde	Oderhaff	536	6 August 1997

== Fatalities and damages ==
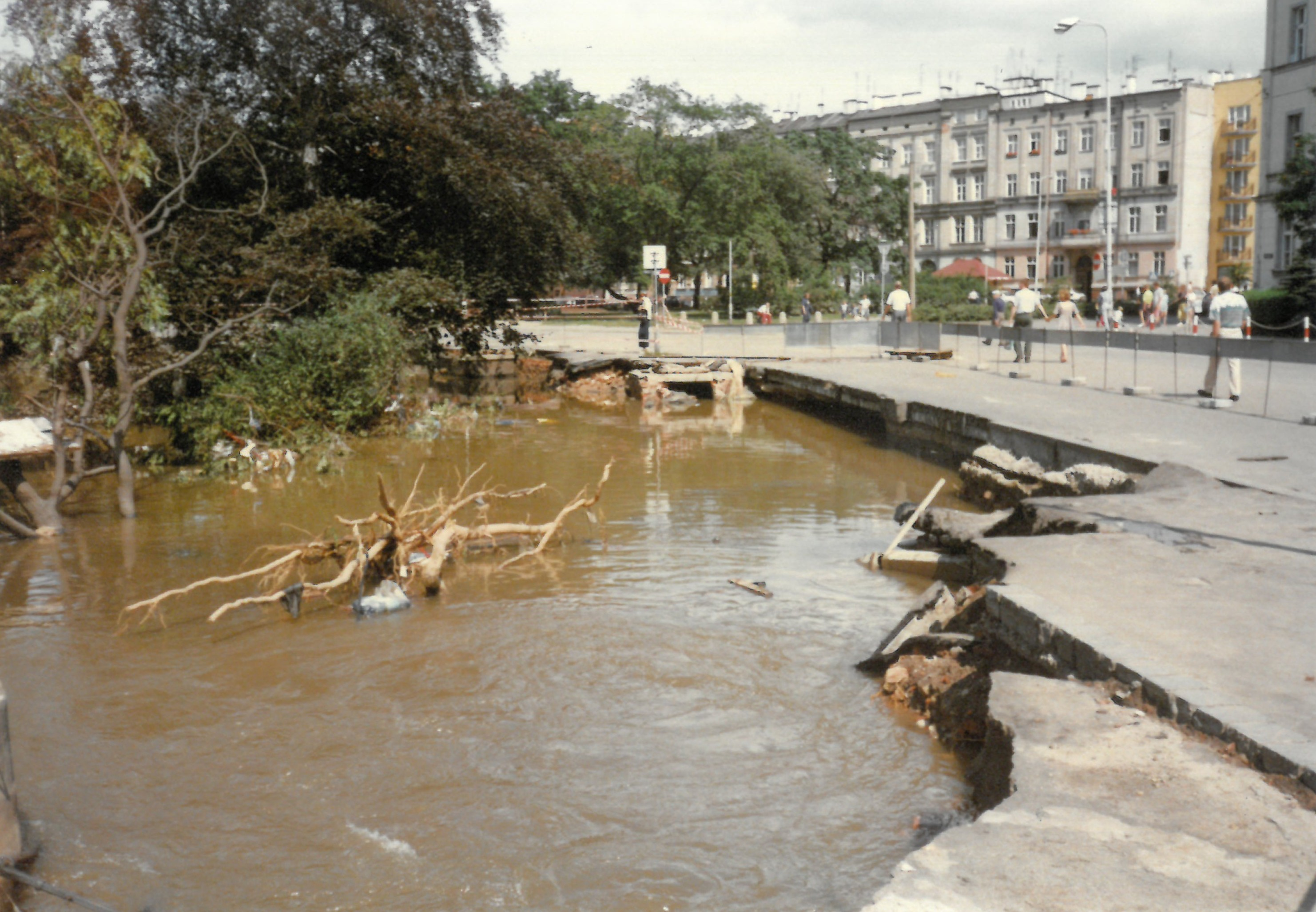
Wrocław, Poland. July 1997. Flooding aftermath. Podwale Street near Krasińskiego, Dąbrowskiego and Komuny Paryskiej St. crossing. Left side of photo – town moat.

The flood caused the deaths of 114 people (56 in Poland, 50 in the Czech Republic) and material damages estimated at $4.5 billion (3.8 billion euros in the Czech Republic and Poland and 330 million euros in Germany).

In Poland, it is estimated that 7,000 people lost all of their possessions. 9,000 private businesses were affected and 680,000 houses were damaged or destroyed. The flood also damaged 843 schools (100 destroyed), 4,000 bridges (45 destroyed), 14,400 km (8,900 mi) of roads and 2,000 km (1,200 mi) of railways. In total, 665,835 hectares (1,645,310 acres) were affected in Poland (an estimated 2% of total Polish territory). The losses were estimated at 7.4-11.3 billion Polish zlotys (or US$2.3–3.5 billion at the 1997 levels). The historic town of Kłodzko sustained damages equivalent to 50 years of its annual budget.

In the Czech Republic, 2,151 flats and 48 bridges were destroyed. 538 villages and towns were affected. The losses were estimated at 63 billion Czech crowns. The town of Troubky was most severely affected.

In Germany there were no fatalities.

== Responses ==
Government responses in the Czech Republic and Poland were criticized. The flood revealed various inadequacies in decision making and infrastructure, although the unprecedented magnitude of the disaster was seen by some as a mitigating factor.

Numerous charities provided aid to those affected by the floods.

== In popular culture ==
In the wake of the floods in 1997, Polish rock band Hey released the song Moja i twoja nadzieja ("My and Your Hope"). All proceeds from the sale of the single went towards victims of the floods. Hey also brought together a group of the most prominent Polish singers at the time to record a cover of the song (known as the "'97 version") for charity-. Also in 1997, Hey released the album Cegiełka na rzecz ofiar powodzi ("A Brick for Flood Victims"), containing five versions of the song - Hey's original single, the '97 version, an instrumental cover, an acoustic cover, and a jazz interpretation (by Anna Maria Jopek).

In October 2022, Netflix released High Water, a Polish-language six-episode limited series inspired by the 1997 flood. Set in Wrocław, Poland, it depicts the lead-up to the floods and reactions by the city and regional authorities, as well as inhabitants of surrounding villages (represented by the fictional village of Kęty). Although directors Jan Holoubek and Bartłomiej Ignaciuk emphasised that the series was not a documentary, they have been praised for the authenticity of the series.

== See also ==
- 2010 Central European floods
- European floods: 2002, 2005, 2006, 2009
- List of floods in Europe
