= Vojáček =

Vojáček (feminine: Vojáčková) is a Czech surname. It is a diminutive of the word voják (soldier). Notable people with the name include:

- Jan Vojáček (born 1981), Czech footballer
- Jiří Vojáček (born 1966), Czech politician
- Kateřina Vojáčková (born 1997), Czech snowboarder
- Rostislav Vojáček (born 1949), Czech footballer

== See also ==
- Wojaczek, Polish version of the surname
