= Below the Surface. ORP Orzeł =

Below The Surface. ORP Orzeł
- Orzeł. Ostatni patrol
- Directed by: Jacek Bławut
- Screenplay by: Jacek Bławut
- Produced by: Anna Bławut-Mazurkiewicz; Bartłomiej Gliński
- Starring: Tomasz Ziętek, Mateusz Kościukiewicz, Antoni Pawlicki, Filip Pławiak, Tomasz Schuchardt, Adam Woronowicz, Rafał Zawierucha
- Cinematography: Jolanta Dylewska
- Edited by: Piasek & Wójcik
- Music by: Tumult
- Release date: 2022

Below The Surface. ORP Orzeł is a 2022 war film written and directed by Jacek Bławut that tells the fictionalized story of ORP Orzeł last mission.

== Cast ==
- Tomasz Ziętek as captain Jan Grudziński
- Mateusz Kościukiewicz as lieutenant Andrzej Piasecki “Pablo”
- Antoni Pawlicki as second lieutenant Marian Mokrski
- Filip Pławiak as second lieutenant Jerzy Sosnowski
- Tomasz Schuchardt as lieutenant Florian Roszak “Trzonek”
- Adam Woronowicz as bosun Henryk Kotecki
- Rafał Zawierucha as cadet Klops
- Jan Butruk as second lieutenant Henryk Kamiński
- Michał Czorny as sailor Alojzy Engelbert Gettka “Stołowy Lolek”
- Michał Darewski as able seaman
- Sebastian Dela as sailor
- Kamil Dobrowolski as sailor Stanisław Uliczny
- Jakub Gąsowski as sailor Zbigniew Kawa
- Ryan Ralph Gerrard as signaller William Fordyce Green
- Filip Gurłacz as mast Jan Torbus
- Hubert Hanowicz as head of drainage boatswain's mast Stanisław Samotus
- Jakub Jakubiec as sailor Emil Krystek
- Edmund C. Short as radio operator Leslie William Jones

== Accolades ==
At the 47th Polish Feature Film Festival in Gdynia, the film received awards for directing (Bławut), sound (Radosław Ochnio, Michał Fojcik), editing (Piasek & Wójcik), and make-up (Dariusz Krysiak). The film received the Polish Film Award Eagle for best production design (Marcelina Początek-Kunikowska) and best sound, and was nominated for Eagle awards for best editing, make-up, costume design, and cinematography.
