= 25 Years of Innocence =

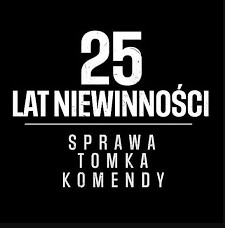
- Directed by: Jan Holoubek
- Written by: Andrzej Golda
- Starring: Agata Kulesza; Piotr Trojan; Magdalena Różczka; Jan Frycz; Dariusz Chojnacki
- Edited by: Rafał Listopad
- Distributed by: Kino Świat
- Release dates: September 4, 2020 (Koszalin Debut Films Festival); September 18, 2020 (Poland)
- Running time: 116 minutes
- Country: Poland
- Language: Polish
- Box office: $ 4 027 477

25 Years of Innocence (Polish: 25 lat niewinności. Sprawa Tomka Komendy) is a 2020 Polish drama film written by Andrzej Golda and directed by Jan Holoubek. It is based on true story of Tomasz Komenda, a young man who was wrongly accused of brutal murder and sentenced to 25 years in prison. The film stars Piotr Trojan as Tomasz, and Agata Kulesza as his mother, Teresa Klemańska.

25 Years of Innocence received critical acclaim and saw commercial success grossing $4,027,477 in box office. At the 2021 Polish Film Awards, 25 Years of Innocence received record 15 nominations, winning seven awards include for, Best Director, Best Actor (Trojan), Best Actress (Kulesza) and Best Supporting Actor (Frycz). It also received two Awards at the Polish Film Festival.

== Plot ==
The film centers on a young man who was falsely accused for rape and was imprisoned for 25 years.

== Cast ==
- Piotr Trojan as Tomasz Komenda
- Agata Kulesza as Teresa Klemańska
- Jan Frycz as 'Stary'
- Andrzej Konopka as Tołopka
- Bartosz Bielenia as Krzysiek Pyzior
- Agnieszka Krukówna as Supreme Court Judge

== Reception ==
Tim Gierson praised depiction of prison horrors and play of supporting actors, especially Kulesza's. Screendaily critic Tim Grierson wrote in his review: "Avoiding emotional fireworks, Kulesza subtly communicates Teresa's beaten-down resilience — she conveys how much the son's imprisonment has taken out of Teresa through quiet, unimaginable weariness."

== Accolades ==
| Award | Category | Recipient | Result |
|---|---|---|---|
| Polish Film Awards | Best Actor | Piotr Trojan | Won |
| Polish Film Awards | Best Supporting Actor | Jan Frycz | Won |
| Polish Film Awards | Best Actress | Agata Kulesza | Won |
| Polish Film Awards | Best Supporting Actress | Magdalena Różczka | Nominated |
| Polish Film Awards | Best Film | Jan Holoubek | Nominated |
