= Rafał Zawierucha =

Polish film, television, and theater actor

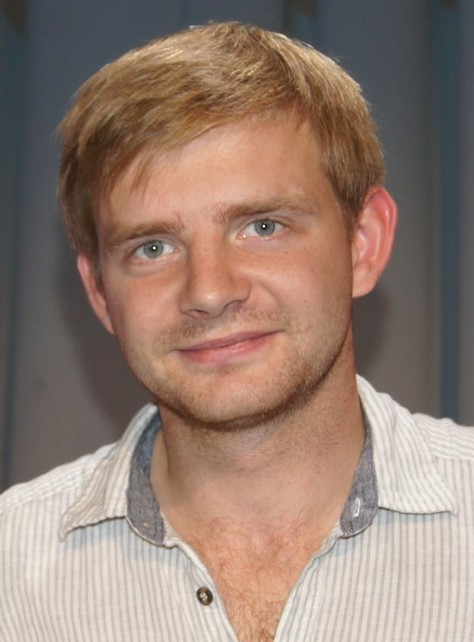
- Zawierucha in 2018
- Born: October 12, 1986 (age 39); Kraków, Poland
- Occupation: Actor

Rafał Zawierucha (born 12 October 1986) is a Polish film and theatre actor, best known for his role of Roman Polanski in the 2019 Quentin Tarantino film Once Upon a Time in Hollywood.

== Life and career ==
Zawierucha was born in Kraków. He grew up in Kielce where he has finished high school. In 2012, Zawierucha graduated Aleksander Zelwerowicz National Academy of Dramatic Art in Warsaw.

He has appeared in Polish movies, including Gods (Bogowie), Jack Strong and Warsaw 44 (Miasto 44), and in TV series like Recipe For Life and Siła wyższa. In 2012, he received a Golden Duck nomination for his role in Andrzej Barański's Księstwo.

In 2019, Zawierucha played director Roman Polanski in Once Upon a Time in Hollywood, a film by Quentin Tarantino that takes place at the time of the 1969 Tate-LaBianca murders.

== Selected filmography ==
| Year | Title | Role | Notes |
|---|---|---|---|
| 2011 | Recipe for Life | Kuba | TV series |
| 2011 | Księstwo | Zbyszek Pasternak | |
| 2011 | Siła wyższa | Franek | TV series |
| 2012 | Ostatnie piętro | | |
| 2014 | Gods | Romuald Cichoń | |
| 2014 | Warsaw 44 | Insurgent | |
| 2014 | Jack Strong | Tank soldier | |
| 2014 | Obywatel | Delegate | |
| 2014 | Wkręceni | Cameraman | |
| 2019 | Once Upon a Time in Hollywood | Roman Polanski | |
| 2019 | The Soviet Sleep Experiment | Dr. Leo Antonoff | |
| 2020 | Letters to Santa 4 | Stefan | |
| 2020 | The Champion | Klimko | |
| 2021 | Bartkowiak | Steppy D | |
| 2021 | The Getaway King | Ujma | |
| 2022 | The Behaviorist | Sebastian Bielak | TV series |
| 2022 | Below the Surface | cadet Klops | |
| 2024 | Inheritance | Officer Trzeciak | |

== See also ==
- Cinema of Poland
