= Under the Volcano (2024 film) =

2024 Polish film by Damian Kocur

- Theatrical release poster
- Polish: Pod wulkanem
- Directed by: Damian Kocur
- Written by: Damian Kocur; Marta Konarzewska
- Produced by: Mikołaj Lizut; Agnieszka Jastrzębska
- Starring: Sofiia Berezovska; Roman Lutskyi; Anastasiia Karpenko; Fedir Pugachov
- Cinematography: Nikita Kuzmenko
- Edited by: Alan Zejer
- Production companies: Lizart Film; Hawk Art; MGM S.A.; TVP
- Release date: 8 September 2024 (TIFF)
- Running time: 102 minutes
- Country: Poland
- Languages: Ukrainian; Spanish; English; Russian; German; Wolof

Under the Volcano (Polish: Pod wulkanem) is a 2024 Polish drama film directed by Damian Kocur. It premiered at the Toronto International Film Festival on 8 September 2024. It was selected as Poland's submission for Best International Feature Film at the 97th Academy Awards.

== Premise ==
A Ukrainian family on vacation in Tenerife learns that they cannot return home due to the Russian invasion of Ukraine.

== Cast ==
- Sofiia Berezovska as Sofiia Kovalenko, a 16-year-old Ukrainian girl
- Roman Lutskyi as Roman Kovalenko, Sofiia's father
- Anastasiia Karpenko as Anastasiia Kovalenko, Sofiia's stepmother
- Fedir Pugachov as Fedir Kovalenko, Sofiia's younger brother

== Release ==
Salaud Morisset acquired international sales rights to the film in August 2024. The trailer was released on 7 September 2024.

The film premiered at the Toronto International Film Festival on 8 September 2024. It will also be screened at the 2024 Polish Film Festival as the festival's opening film.

== Reception ==
Jared Mobarak of The Film Stage gave the film a grade of B+, writing that "[Damian] Kocur has given form to the purgatory of survival in times of horror." David Katz of Cineuropa wrote, "From an immediately pressurised opening, Under the Volcano drifts into a pleasing and paradoxically hypnotic kind of stasis, shot with oft-deteriorated available light and in shallow focus with long lenses – not quite a 'hangout' movie, and more about biding time in urban loneliness...."

The film has received mixed reviews in Poland. Filmweb assigned the film a score of 6.3 out of 10 based on 33 critic ratings.

== Accolades ==
Award	Year	Category	Recipient(s)	Result	Ref.
BFI London Film Festival	2024	Best Film	Under the Volcano	Nominated	
Cork International Film Festival	2024	Spirit of the Festival Award	Under the Volcano	Nominated	
Polish Film Festival	2024	Golden Lions	Under the Volcano	Nominated	
Polish Film Festival	2024	Best Professional Acting Debut	Sofiia Berezovska	Won	
Marrakech International Film Festival	2024	Étoile d'Or	Under the Volcano	Nominated	
Marrakech International Film Festival	2024	Best Director	Damian Kocur	Won	
Marrakech International Film Festival	2024	Best Performance by an Actor	Roman Lutskyi	Won	
São Paulo International Film Festival	2024	New Directors Competition	Under the Volcano	Nominated	
Thessaloniki International Film Festival	2024	Golden Alexander	Under the Volcano	Nominated	
Warsaw Film Festival	2024	Crème de la Crème Award	Under the Volcano	Nominated	
Zurich Film Festival	2024	Best International Feature Film	Under the Volcano	Nominated	

== See also ==
- List of Polish submissions for the Academy Award for Best International Feature Film
- List of submissions to the 97th Academy Awards for Best International Feature Film
