= High Water (TV series) =

2022 Polish television series

- Polish poster
- Polish: Wielka woda
- Genre: Historical drama
- Created by: Jan Holoubek; Bartłomiej Ignaciuk
- Story by: Kasper Bajon
- Directed by: Jan Holoubek
- Starring: Agnieszka Żulewska
- Country of origin: Poland
- Original languages: Polish; English
- No. of seasons: 1
- No. of episodes: 6

Production
- Cinematography: Marek Warszewski
- Production companies: Netflix; Telemark

Original release
- Network: Netflix
- Release: 5 October 2022

High Water (Polish: Wielka woda) is a Polish historical drama TV series created by Jan Holoubek and based on Kasper Bajon's work. It was released on Netflix on 5 October 2022. The series is about the 1997 Central European flood specifically about the incidents in Wrocław (1997 Central European flood in Wrocław).

== Synopsis ==
The series takes place in 1997 in Wrocław, when the 1997 Central European flood is nearing the city. The main character is the hydrologist Jaśmina Tremer, who returns to Wrocław after many years to help handle the crisis. During the series, the characters have to face not only the incompetence of the local authorities, but also their own past.

Apart from Wrocław, the names of the towns and villages are fictitious, e.g. Kęty is actually Łany, while Gierżoniów is Nysa, situated on Nyskie Lake, where the regatta was actually held at the time, which delayed the emptying of the reservoir located on the Eastern Neisse, which is a tributary of the Oder on which Wrocław lies.

== Cast ==
- Agnieszka Żulewska as Jaśmina Tremer
- Tomasz Schuchardt as Jakub Marczak
- Ireneusz Czop as Andrzej Rębacz
- Blanka Kot as Klara Marczak
- Anna Dymna as Lena Tremer
- Jerzy Trela as Szymon Rębacz
- Jacek Beler as Kalosz
- Klara Bielawka as Beata Kozarowicz
- Lech Dyblik as Korzun
- Roman Gancarczyk as Prof. Jan Nowak
- Łukasz Garlicki as Kulesza
- Tomasz Kot as the mayor of Wrocław
- Mirosław Kropielnicki as Col. Czacki
- Łukasz Lewandowski as Dr. Sławomir Góra
- Leszek Lichota as the deputy minister
- Maria Maj as Barbara
- Adam Nawojczyk as the voivode of Wrocław
- Marta Nieradkiewicz as Ewa Rucik
- Katarzyna Pośpiech as Maja Kruk
- Piotr Rogucki as Lt. Marek Rozwałka
- Tomasz Sapryk as Andrzej Talarek
- Dariusz Toczek as Piepka
- Piotr Trojan as Maciej Waligóra
- Grzegorz Warchoł as Kazimierz
