= Polish Academy Award for Best European Film =

Annual Polish film award

The Polish Academy Award for Best European Film is an annual award given to the best European film of the year.

== Winners and nominees ==
Year	Movie title	Director	Country
2005	Girl with a Pearl Earring	Peter Webber	United Kingdom / Luxembourg
2005	The Return	Andrey Zvyaginstev	Russia
2005	Bad Education	Pedro Almodóvar	Spain
2006	My Summer of Love	Paweł Pawlikowski	United Kingdom
2006	Buttoners	Petr Zelenka	Czech Republic
2006	Control	Nimród Antal	Hungary
2007	Volver	Pedro Almodóvar	Spain
2007	Copying Beethoven	Agnieszka Holland	Germany / United States
2007	The Wind That Shakes the Barley	Ken Loach	Germany / Italy / Spain / France / Republic of Ireland / United Kingdom
2008	The Lives of Others	Florian Henckel von Donnersmarck	Germany
2008	The Queen	Stephen Frears	United Kingdom / France / Italy
2008	4 Months, 3 Weeks and 2 Days	Cristian Mungiu	Romania
2009	The Diving Bell and the Butterfly	Julian Schnabel	France / United States
2009	Mamma mia!	Phyllida Lloyd	United Kingdom / Germany / United States
2009	Empties	Jan Svěrák	Czech Republic / United Kingdom
2010	The White Ribbon	Michael Haneke	Germany / Austria / France / Italy
2010	Slumdog Millionaire	Danny Boyle	United Kingdom
2010	Vicky Cristina Barcelona	Woody Allen	Spain / United States
2011	The Ghost Writer	Roman Polanski	France / Germany / United Kingdom
2011	A Prophet	Jacques Audiard	France / Italy
2011	Death in Venice	Luchino Visconti	Italy / France
2012	The King's Speech	Tom Hooper	United Kingdom
2012	Melancholia	Lars von Trier	Denmark / Sweden / France / Germany
2012	Tinker Tailor Soldier Spy	Tomas Alfredson	France / United Kingdom / Germany
2013	Amour	Michael Haneke	Austria / France / Germany
2013	The Artist	Michel Hazanavicius	France / United States
2013	Intouchables	Éric Toledano and Olivier Nakache	France
2014	Searching for Sugar Man	Malik Bendjelloul	Sweden / United Kingdom
2014	Blue Is the Warmest Colour	Abdellatif Kechiche	France / Belgium / Spain
2014	The Best Offer	Giuseppe Tornatore	Italy
2015	Leviathan	Andrey Zvyagintsev	Russia
2015	The Great Beauty	Paolo Sorrentino	Italy / France
2015	Nymphomaniac	Lars von Trier	Denmark / Belgium / France / Germany
2016	Youth	Paolo Sorrentino	Italy / France / Switzerland / United Kingdom
2016	Mr.Turner	Mike Leigh	United Kingdom / Germany / France
2016	A Pigeon Sat on a Branch Reflecting on Existence	Roy Andersson	Sweden / Norway / France / Germany / Denmark
2017	Son of Saul	László Nemes	Hungary
2017	Florence Foster Jenkins	Stephen Frears	United Kingdom / France
2017	I, Daniel Blake	Ken Loach	United Kingdom / France
2018	'The Square	Ruben Östlund	Sweden / Germany / France / Denmark
2018	Perfect Strangers	Paolo Genovese	Italy
2018	Toni Erdmann	Maren Ade	Germany / Austria
2019	Three Billboards Outside Ebbing, Missouri	Martin McDonagh	United States / United Kingdom
2019	Dogman	Matteo Garrone	Italy
2019	Loveless	Andrey Zvyagintsev	Russia / France / Belgium / Germany
2020	The Favourite	Yorgos Lanthimos	United Kingdom / Ireland / United States
2020	Pain and Glory	Pedro Almodóvar	Spain
2020	An Officer and a Spy	Roman Polański	France / Italy
2020	Honeyland	Tamara Kotevska Ljubomir Stefanov	North Macedonia
2020	Beanpole	Kantemir Balagov	Russia
2021	Les Misérables	Ladj Ly	France
2021	The County	Grímur Hákonarson	Iceland
2021	Judy	Rupert Goold	United Kingdom / United States / France
2021	Emma	Autumn de Wilde	United Kingdom / United States
2021	The Traitor	Marco Bellocchio	Italy / Brazil / France / Germany
2022	Another Round	Thomas Vinterberg	Denmark / Netherlands / Sweden
2022	Annette	Leos Carax	France / Germany / Belgium / United States / Japan / Mexico / Switzerland
2022	The Father	Florian Zeller	France / United Kingdom
2022	Berlin Alexanderplatz	Burhan Qurbani	Germany / Netherlands / Canada
2022	Titane	Julia Ducournau	France / Belgium
2023	Ennio	Giuseppe Tornatore	Italy / Belgium / Japan / Netherlands
2023	Parallel Mothers	Pedro Almodóvar	Spain
2023	Paris, 13th District	Jacques Audiard	France
2023	The Worst Person in the World	Joachim Trier	Norway / France / Denmark / Sweden
2023	Vortex	Gaspar Noé	France / Belgium / Monaco
2024	Triangle of Sadness	Ruben Östlund	Sweden / Germany / France / United Kingdom
2024	20,000 Species of Bees	Estibaliz Urresola Solaguren	Spain
2024	Aftersun	Jacques Audiard	United Kingdom / United States
2024	Close	Lukas Dhont	Belgium / France / Netherlands
2024	Corsage	Marie Kreutzer	Austria / Germany / Luxembourg / France
2024	The Quiet Girl	Colm Bairéad	Ireland

== See also ==
- European Film Awards
