= 2021 Polish Film Awards =

23rd Polish Film Awards
- Date: 21 June 2021
- Site: Służewiec Racecourse, Warsaw
- Hosted by: Grażyna Torbicka

Highlights
- Best Film: Kill It and Leave This Town
- Best Director: Jan Holoubek; 25 Years of Innocence
- Best Actor: Piotr Trojan; 25 Years of Innocence
- Best Actress: Agata Kulesza; 25 Years of Innocence
- Most awards: 25 Years of Innocence (7)
- Most nominations: 25 Years of Innocence (15)

Television coverage
- Network: Canal+

The 23rd Polish Film Awards took place on 21 June 2021 at the Służewiec Racecourse in Warsaw, Poland. The ceremony honored the best in Polish cinema of 2020, presented by the Polish Film Academy. It was hosted by presenter Grażyna Torbicka.

== Winners and nominees ==
The nominations were announced on 22 April 2021. Winners are listed first, highlighted in boldface, and indicated with a double dagger (‡).

**Best Film**: **Kill It and Leave This Town – Mariusz Wilczyński**‡; 25 Years of Innocence – Jan Holoubek; Charlatan – Agnieszka Holland; The Hater – Jan Komasa; I Never Cry – Piotr Domalewski	**Best European Film**: **(France) Les Misérables – Ladj Ly**‡; (Iceland) (Denmark) (France) (Germany) The County – Grímur Hákonarson; (United Kingdom) Emma. – Autumn de Wilde; (United Kingdom) Judy – Rupert Goold; (Italy) (France) (Brazil) (Germany) The Traitor – Marco Bellocchio
**Best TV Series**: **The King – Jan P. Matuszyński**‡; Angel of Death – Sławomir Fabicki, Maciej Bochniak, Anna Kazejak; Chyłka. Rewizja – Łukasz Palkowski, Marek Wróbel; Rysa – Maciej Migas, Łukasz Kośmicki; The Woods – Bartosz Konopka, Leszek Dawid	**Best Director**: **Jan Holoubek – 25 Years of Innocence**‡; Piotr Domalewski – I Never Cry; Agnieszka Holland – Charlatan; Jan Komasa – The Hater; Mariusz Wilczyński – Kill It and Leave This Town
**Best Actor**: **Piotr Trojan – 25 Years of Innocence as Tomasz Komenda**‡; Arkadiusz Jakubik – I Never Cry as Marek Mazurek; Maciej Musiałowski – The Hater as Tomasz Giemza; Andrzej Seweryn – Zieja as Jan Zieja; Ivan Trojan – Charlatan as Jan Mikolášek	**Best Actress**: **Agata Kulesza – 25 Years of Innocence as Teresa Klemańska**‡; Zofia Domalik – All for My Mother as Ola; Agata Kulesza – Never Gonna Snow Again as Ewa; Maja Ostaszewska – Never Gonna Snow Again as Maria; Zofia Stafiej – I Never Cry as Ola Hudzik
**Best Supporting Actor**: **Jan Frycz – 25 Years of Innocence as "Stary"**‡; Andrzej Chyra – Never Gonna Snow Again as Soldier; Andrzej Konopka – 25 Years of Innocence as Officer Kołoczko; Łukasz Simlat – Never Gonna Snow Again as Wika's husband; Maciej Stuhr – The Hater as Paweł Rudnicki	**Best Supporting Actress**: **Kinga Preis – I Never Cry as Ola's mother**‡; Agata Kulesza – The Hater as Beata Santorska; Magdalena Różczka – 25 Years of Innocence as Katarzyna Korejwo; Maria Sobocińska – All for My Mother as Agnes; Danuta Stenka – The Hater as Zofia Krasucka
**Best Screenplay**: **Kill It and Leave This Town – Mariusz Wilczyński**‡; 25 Years of Innocence – Andrzej Gołda; Charlatan – Marek Epstein; The Hater – Mateusz Pacewicz; I Never Cry – Piotr Domalewski	**Best Cinematography**: **I Never Cry – Piotr Sobociński Jr.**‡; **Never Gonna Snow Again – Michał Englert**‡; 25 Years of Innocence – Bartłomiej Kaczmarek; Charlatan – Martin Štrba; Interior – Paweł Flis; Zieja – Witold Płóciennik
**Best Production Design**: **Valley of the Gods – Christopher Demuri and Lech Majewski**‡; 25 Years of Innocence – Maciej Fajst; Charlatan – Milan Býček; The Hater – Katarzyna Sobańska and Marcel Sławiński; Kill It and Leave This Town – Mariusz Wilczyński	**Best Makeup and Hairstyling**: **25 Years of Innocence – Liliana Gałązka and Mirela Zawiszewska**‡; All for My Mother – Pola Guźlińska; Charlatan – Gabriela Polakova and Rene Stejskal; The Garden – Áslaug Dröfn Sigurðardóttir; Never Gonna Snow Again – Waldemar Pokromski; Valley of the Gods – Dominika Dylewska; Zieja – Ewa Drobiec and Grzegorz Szczuka
**Best Costume Design**: **Charlatan – Katarina Štrbová-Bieliková**‡; 25 Years of Innocence – Weronika Orlińska; The Hater – Małgorzata Zacharska; Never Gonna Snow Again – Katarzyna Lewińska; Psy 3: W imię zasad – Małgorzata Braszka; Zieja – Elżbieta Radke and Zuzanna Glińska	**Best Film Score**: **Kill It and Leave This Town – Tadeusz Nalepa**‡; All for My Mother – Włodek Pawlik; Charlatan – Antoni Komasa-Łazarkiewicz and Mary Komasa-Łazarkiewicz; The Hater – Michał Jacaszek; I Never Cry – Hania Rani
**Best Sound**: **Kill It and Leave This Town – Franciszek Kozłowski**‡; 25 Years of Innocence – Kacper Habisiak, Marcin Kamiński, and Przemysław Kamieński; Catalina – Joanna Napieralska; The Hater – Kacper Habisiak, Marcin Kasiński, and Jerzy Murawski; Zieja – Krzysztof Jastrząb	**Best Editing**: **25 Years of Innocence – Rafał Listopad**‡; Charlatan – Pavel Hrdlička; From Within – Cezary Grzesiuk; The Hater – Aleksandra Gowin; I Never Cry – Agnieszka Glińska
**Best Documentary**: **The Whale from Lorino – Maciej Cuske**‡; Guczo. Notes on Life – Maria Zmarz-Koczanowicz; Lessons of Love – Małgorzata Goliszewska and Katarzyna Mateja; An Ordinary Country – Tomasz Wolski; The Wall of Shadows – Eliza Kubarska	**Discovery of the Year**: **Jan Holoubek – 25 Years of Innocence (Directing)**‡; Zofia Domalik – All for My Mother (Acting); Zofia Stafiej – I Never Cry (Acting); Mariusz Wilczyński – Kill It and Leave This Town (Directing); Mariusz Wilczyński – Kill It and Leave This Town (Screenplay)
**Audience Award**: **The Hater – Jan Komasa**	**Life Achievement Award**: **Jerzy Matuszkiewicz**

== Films with multiple awards and nominations ==
Films with multiple nominations
Nominations	Film
15	25 Years of Innocence
13	The Hater
10	Charlatan
10	I Never Cry
8	Kill It and Leave This Town
7	Never Gonna Snow Again
5	All for My Mother
5	Zieja
2	Valley of the Gods

Films with multiple wins
Wins	Film
7	25 Years of Innocence
4	Kill It and Leave This Town
2	I Never Cry
