= Jacek Lusiński =

Polish film director

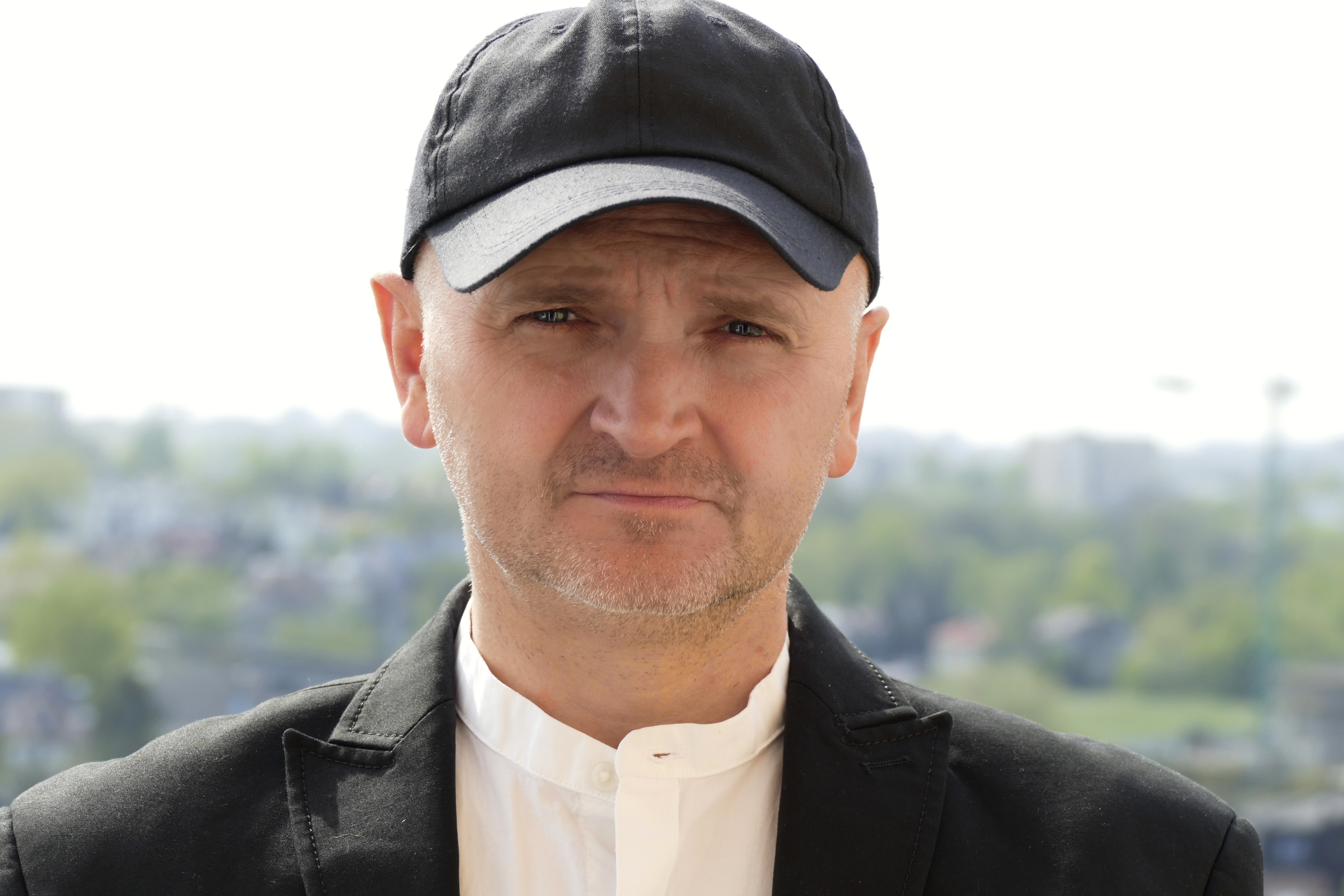
Jacek Lusiński

Jacek Lusiński (born 30 April 1969) is a Polish film director, scriptwriter, lyricist, and author of the book Carte Blanche, published by Axis Mundi. He makes feature films, documentaries, commercials and video clips. He graduated from the Łódź Film School. He is a member of the European Film Academy and the Polish Filmmakers Association.

== Cinematography ==
- 2004 – „Niezła Jazda” ("A Jolly Good Ride") – (feature length) – scriptwriter and director
- 2007 – „Wrzesien 39” ("September 39") – a documentary series made for Discovery and TVN channels – scriptwriter (co-written with Paweł Sliwinski), director
- 2009 – „Piksele” ("Pixels") – scriptwriter and director
- 2010 – „Polska liga cudzoziemska” ("Polish Foreign League") – a documentary series (Polsat TV) scriptwriter (Season 1 hosted by Piotr Kedzierski)
- 2011 – „Polska liga cudzoziemska” ("Polish Foreign League") – a documentary series (Polsat TV) scriptwriter (Season 2 hosted by Olaf Lubaszenko)
- 2015 – "Carte Blanche" – a feature film – scriptwriter and drirector
- 2022 "Śubuk" ("Backwards" - English title) - a feature film - scriptwriter and director
- "Minuta Ciszy" ("A Minute of Silence" - premium TV series - Canal+) - originator, showrunner, scriptwriter, director.

== Other work ==
Lusinski is the author of the book Carte Blanche, published by Axis Mundi in 2015.

== Awards and honorable mentions ==
- Best full-length feature film - International Film Festival Inclus Barcelona 2023
- Audience Award - International Film Festival Inclus Barcelona 2023 -
- Best feature film script 2023 - Polish Screenwriters' Guild
- "Śubuk" - Golden Lions Polish Film Festival Gdynia 2022 - award for the best script

- "Minuta ciszy" ("A Minute of Silence") - Polish Film Award Eagles 2023 - nomination "Best fiction film series"
- "Śubuk" - Tarnów Film Award (Audience Award) 2023
- "Śubuk" - Polish Film Award Eagles 2023 - Best supporting role for Andrzej Seweryn
- Main Prize – Script Pro Contest 2019
- Finalist Script Pro Contest 2012
- Finalist Script Pro Contest 2019
- "Pixels" – "Brown Granate" award at the Comedy Film Festival in Lubomierz
- "Pixels" – Nominated to "Zlota Kaczka" award for the best director
- "Pixels" – Nominated to "Zlota Kaczka" award for the best script
- Finalist of the "Script Pro 2012" contest with the script of the feature film "Carte Blanche"
- "Carte Blanche" – Jury Grand Prix at 18th Shanghai International Film Festival (the jury presided by Andrey Zvyagintsev)
- "Carte Blanche" – " Jury’s Honorable Mention – 39th São Paulo International Film Festival MOSTRA (the jury presided by Geraldine Chaplin)
- "Carte Blanche" – Audience Award at the 8th "Wisła" Polish Film Festival in Moscow
- "Carte Blanche" – Jury's Honorable Mention at 44th Lubuskie Film Summer, Łagów 2015
- "Carte Blanche" – " Best Actor Award in a Leading Role Andrzej Chyra – China Golden Rooster & Hundred Flowers Film Festival
- "Carte Blanche" – "Special Award for Best Actor in a Leading Role for Andrzej Chyra – BAP Cine Festival Buenos Aires
- "Carte Blanche" – " Best Actor Award in a Leading Role" for Andrzej Chyra – The New York Polish Film Festival
- "Carte Blanche" – "Whitebox" – Best sound Award – BlueBox Festival Olsztyn
- "Carte Blanche" – Main Award – Toronto Polish Film Festival
- "Carte Blanche" – novel – 2nd place "Book of the Year 2015 – plebiscite by lubimyczytac.pl
- "Carte Blanche" – The best producer's debut award 2015 – Polish Audiovisual Producers Chamber of Commerce
- "Carte Blanche" – The Best Fiction Movie – 2016 – International Disability Film Festival – Barcelona
