= Wojaczek =

Wojaczek is a gender-neutral Polish surname. It is equivalent to the Czech surname Vojáček. Notable people with this surname include:

- Rafał Wojaczek (1945–1971), Polish poet
- Andrzej Wojaczek (1947–2000), Polish film and theatre actor
- Marek Wojaczek, Polish speedway judge of international class
- Adi Wojaczek, Polish-German film director
