= Ireneusz Czop =

Polish actor (born 1968)

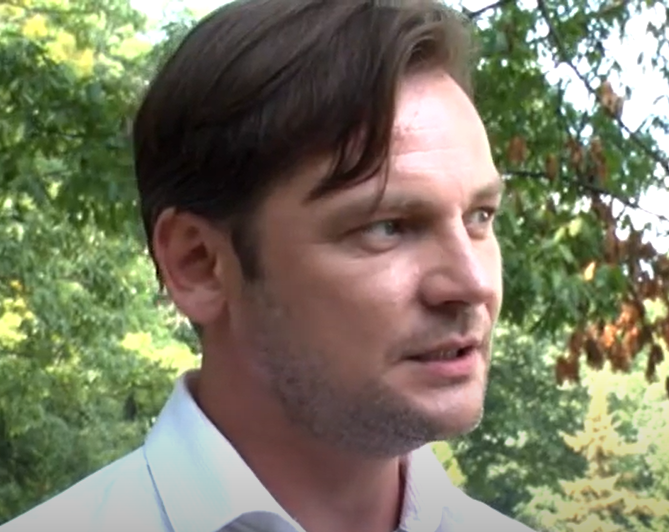
- Czop in 2011
- Born: 6 July 1968 (age 57); Płock, Poland
- Education: Łódź Film School
- Occupation: Actor
- Years active: 1995–present
- Spouse: Jolanta Jackowska (divorced)
- Children: 2

Ireneusz Czop (Polish pronunciation: [i.rɛˈnɛ.uʂ ˈt͡ʂɔp]; born 6 July 1968) is a Polish actor. He is best known for his roles in the films Somers Town (2008), Aftermath (2012), Jack Strong (2014), and Broad Peak (2022).

== Biography ==
Czop was born in Płock. In his youth, he was an altar boy and played in the II liga for Wisła Płock. He considered becoming a priest before pursuing acting. He graduated from the Łódź Film School. He began his career acting at the New Theatre and Stefan Jaracz Theatre in Łódź. He has also worked as a lecturer at the Łódź Film School.

== Personal life ==
He was married to actress Jolanta Jackowska, with whom he has a son, Michał. They later divorced. He had a second child, a daughter named Maja, with actress Teresa Dzielska.

== Filmography ==
=== Film ===
Year	Title	Role	Ref.
1996	Słodko gorzki	Ignac	
2003	Pornografia	Wyszyński	
2005	Lawstorant	Dags	
2008	Somers Town	Mariusz	
2008	Nieruchomy poruszyciel	Manager	
2009	The General: The Gibraltar Assassination	Perry	
2009	Jestem twój	Jacek	
2011	In Darkness	Janowska SS Officer	
2011	Leśne Doły	Andrzej	
2012	Felix, Net i Nika oraz Teoretycznie Możliwa Katastrofa	Commander	
2012	Dzień kobiet	Friend	
2012	Baby Blues	Policeman	
2012	Być jak Kazimierz Deyna	Doctor	
2012	Aftermath	Franciszek Kalina	
2013	Ostra randka	Commissioner Lisiecki	
2014	Jack Strong	Rakowiecki	
2014	Kochanie, chyba cię zabiłem	Wierzbowski	
2014	Karuzela	Accountant	
2014	Obywatel	Director "Kuszy"	
2015	Zyc nie umierac	Romek	
2016	Volhynia	Priest Adam	
2016	Prosta historia o morderstwie	Krzszystof	
2017	Konwój	Teacher Kulesza	
2017	Miłość w Mieście Ogrodów	Michał	
2017	Ach śpij kochanie	Gawlina	
2017	Labirynt świadomości	Viktor Szwarc	
2018	Kobieta sukcesu	Uncle	
2022	Detektyw Bruno	Colonel Roman Wolicki	
2022	Marzec '68	Uncle	
2022	Na chwilę, na zawsze	Pola's father	
2022	Broad Peak	Maciej Berbeka	

=== Television ===
Year	Title	Role	Notes	Ref.
1994	Tu stoję...	Bentkiewicz's son	Television film	
2000–2001	The Lousy World	Michał Anioł	2 episodes	
2001	Małopole czyli świat	Robert Raube	3 episodes	
2002	Samo życie	Przemysław Woliński		
2003–2005	Sprawa na dziś	Piotr Kozłowski	37 episodes	
2004	Glina	Mariusz Stępień	2 episodes	
2006	Plebania	Konrad	5 episodes	
2006	Pensjonat pod Różą	Jerzy Adamek	2 episodes	
2006–2007	Kopciuszek	Walczak	19 episodes	
2007	Crime Detectives	Kamiński	1 episode	
2007–2008	First Love	Bronisław Pawicki	22 episodes	
2009–2010	Majka	Tymon Zachowicz		
2010	Hotel 52	Czarek	2 episodes	
2010	Klub szalonych dziewic	Albert Walczak	4 episodes	
2010	Blondynka	Wasiak	9 episodes	
2010–2011	1920. Wojna i miłość	Jakub	9 episodes	
2010–2012	Father Matthew	Krzszystof Janiszewski; Jan Kapliński	2 episodes	
2011	Układ Warszawski	Maciej Stadnicki	1 episode	
2011	Szpilki na Giewoncie	Igor Ketler	12 episodes	
2011	Bez tajemnic	Daniel Nowak	1 episode	
2012	True Law	Marcin Chojecki	2 episodes	
2012	Misja Afganistan	Captain Głódź	4 episodes	
2012–2017	Na dobre i na złe	Dr. Tomasz	48 episodes	
2012–2017	Komisarz Alex	Ryszard Puchała	128 episodes	
2013	Medics	Kostrzewa	1 episode	
2014	Days of Honor	Alfred Knapik	3 episodes	
2015	Skazane	Adam Miller	13 episodes	
2017	Ultraviolet	Łukasz Rolak	2 episodes	
2018	Nielegalni	Marek Bielik	8 episodes	
2018–2021	The Mire	Andrzej Warecki	9 episodes	
2019–2022	The Defence	Commissioner Szczerbiński	23 episodes	
2022	High Water	Andrzej Rebacz	6 episodes	
2023	Kres niewinności	Colonel Roman Wolicki	4 episodes	
2023–2024	Krew	Jerzy Gajewski	12 episodes	
2024	Matylda	Tadeusz Biliński		
2025	The Breslau Murders	Johann Holtz	8 episodes	
