= Ewa Dyakowska-Berbeka =

Polish painter, graphic and stage designer

- Born: 22 September 1957; Bielsko-Biała, Poland
- Died: 29 April 2018 (aged 60)
- Known for: Painting

Ewa Dyakowska-Berbeka (22 September 1957 – 29 April 2018) was a Polish painter, graphic and stage designer.

== Biography ==
Dyakowska-Berbeka studied at the State Higher School of Visual Arts in Gdańsk at the Faculty of Painting and Graphic Arts. She obtained her diploma in the studio of Prof. Jerzy Krechowicz in 1982. She created her works mostly in the collage technique. Her achievements included many group and individual exhibitions at home and abroad, including in the Municipal Art Gallery in Zakopane, the Yatki Gallery in Nowy Targ, the Yam Gallery, the Logos Theater Gallery in Łódź, the diocesan Museum in Opole. Her works can be found in the collections of the Sanctuary of Our Lady of Fatima in Krzeptówki, The Tatra Museum in Zakopane, and private collections at home and abroad. She has collaborated with the Witkacy Theater continuously since 1985. She created the set design for, inter alia, Adam Zagajewski's "Treasonry" directed by Paweł Woldan, "Demon of the Earth, Pandora's Boxes" by Frank Wedekind, and for "Theatrum caeremoniarum" by Molière directed by Andrzej Dziuk. She was a laureate of the Award of the Mayor of the City of Zakopane. She died after a long and serious illness. The artist lived and worked in Zakopane.

== Personal life ==
Daughter of prof. Andrzej Dyakowski (1936), painter and professor at the Academy of Fine Arts in Gdańsk. She was the wife of Maciej Berbeka (1954–2013), a mountaineer who died in 2013 during a trip to Broad Peak. They had four sons.

Beata Sabale-Zielińska told us about her life in the book "How Is Love High? Life after Broad Peak" (Warsaw, 2016).
