= Damian Kocur =

Polish film director (born 1983)

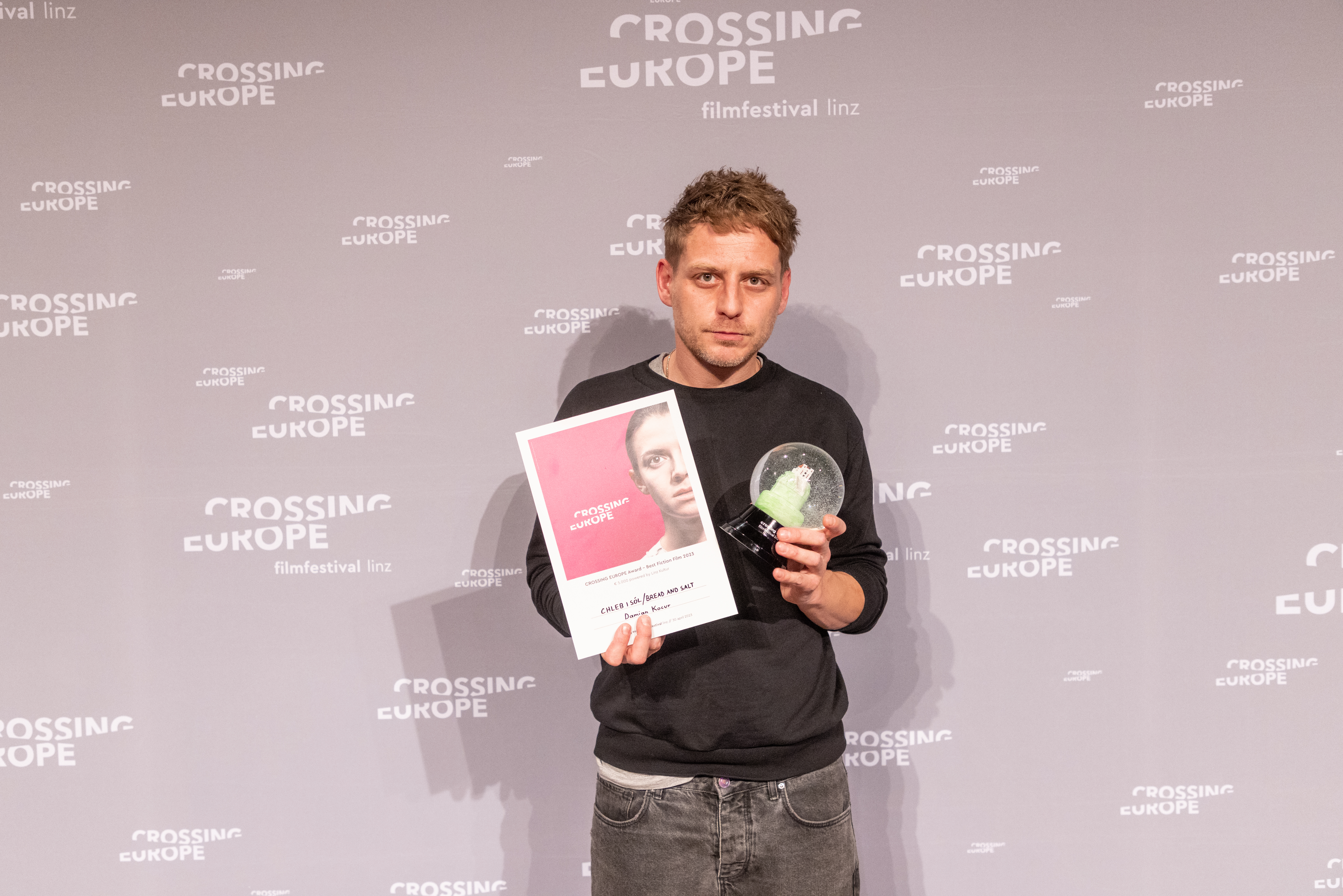
- Born: 23 September 1983 (age 43); Katowice, Poland

Damian Kocur (born 23 September 1983) is a Polish film director, whose debut feature film Bread and Salt (Chleb i sól) premiered in 2022.

== Career ==
A graduate of the Krzysztof Kieślowski Film School, he directed a number of short films prior to Bread and Salt. The film premiered at the 79th Venice International Film Festival, where it won a Special Jury Prize in the Orizzonti program. Kocur subsequently won the Polish Film Award for Discovery of the Year, and was nominated for Best Director, at the 25th Polish Film Awards in 2023.

His second feature film, Under the Volcano (Pod wulkanem), premiered at the 2024 Toronto International Film Festival.
