= Piotr Trojan =

Polish actor (born 1986)

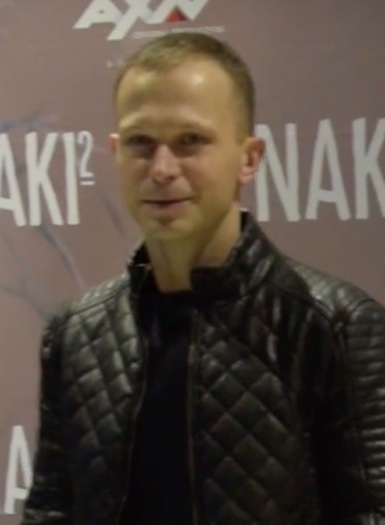
- Trojan
- Born: June 6, 1986 (age 40); Tarnowskie Góry, Silesia, Poland
- Education: Łódź Film School
- Occupation: Actor
- Years active: 2005–present

Piotr Trojan (born June 6, 1986) is a Polish actor and playwright. He received the Polish Academy Award for Best Actor and Gdynia Film Festival Award for Best Actor for playing the leading role in the 2020 drama film, 25 Years of Innocence. He later starred in the biographical drama film Johnny (2022), receiving his second Gdynia Film Festival Award for Best Actor, and was nominated for Polish Academy Award for Best Actor.

== Life and career ==
Trojan was born and raised in Tarnowskie Góry and graduated from Łódź Film School in 2009. He began his career appearing in local stage productions before debuting in Stefan Jaracz Theatre in 2007 and TR Warszawa in 2014. He also began appearing on television, playing guest-starring roles in Days of Honor, L for Love, Father Matthew, Na dobre i na złe, The Border, Na Wspólnej and Wartime Girls. From 2018 to 2020, he starred in the crime thriller series, Signs. From 2019 to 2020, Trojan also had a recurring role in the soap opera, First Love.

In 2020, Trojan starred alongside Agata Kulesza in the drama film 25 Years of Innocence, based on a true story about a young man who was falsely accused for rape and was imprisoned for 25 years. For his performance, Trojan received positive reviews. At the 2021 Polish Film Awards, Trojan won Polish Academy Award for Best Actor. He also received Gdynia Film Festival Award for Best Actor. The following year he appeared in the crime drama film Operation Hyacinth on Netflix. In 2022, Trojan starred in the biographical drama film, Johnny, receiving his second Gdynia Film Festival Award for Best Actor, and was nominated for Polish Academy Award for Best Actor.

Trojan is openly gay. He came out in 2016.

== Selected filmography ==
- Life Feels Good (2013)
- 25 Years of Innocence (2020)
- All Our Fears (2021)
- Operation Hyacinth (2021)
- Johnny (2022)
- The Partisan (2024)
