= Jan Holoubek =

Polish director (born 1978)

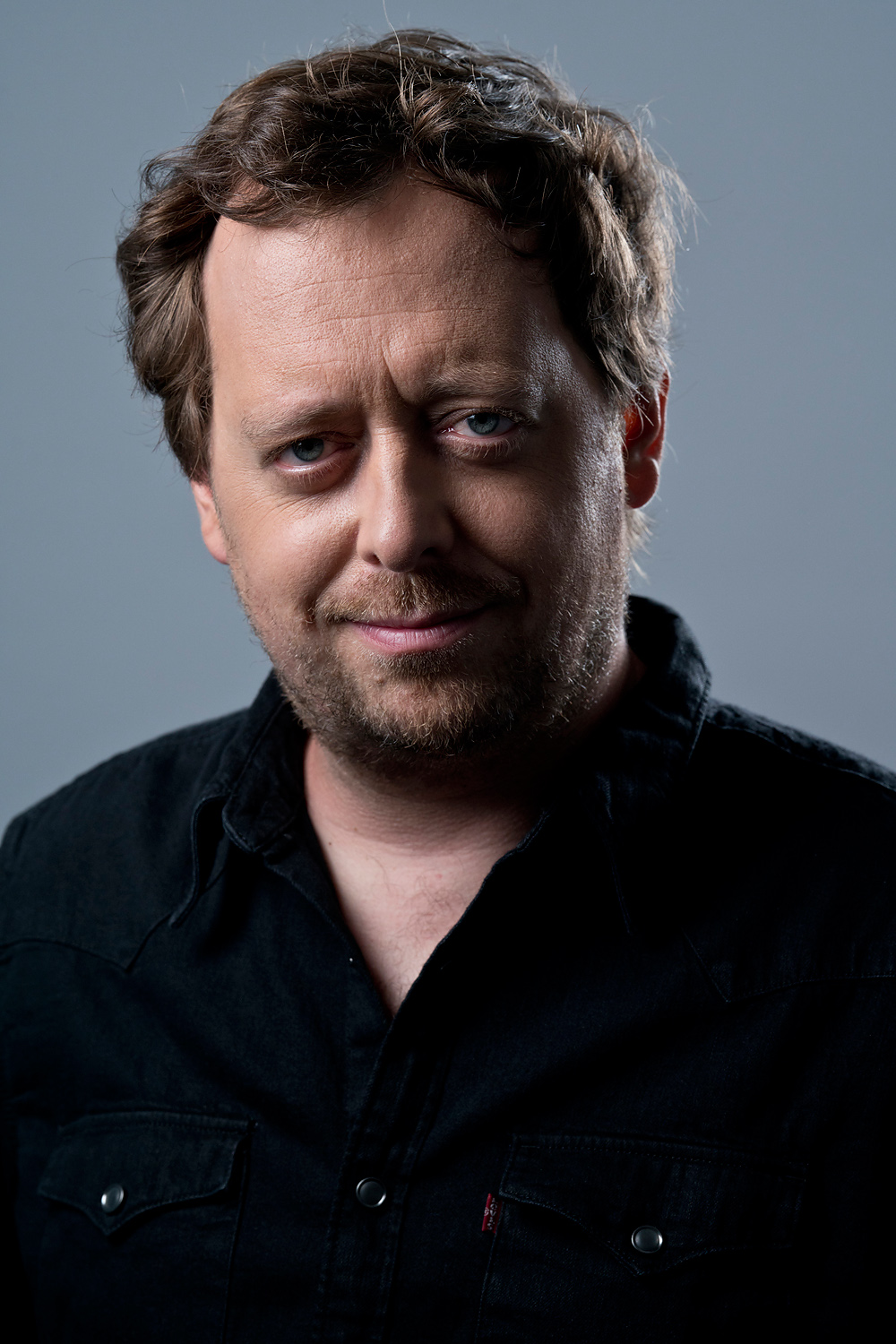
- Holoubek in 2021
- Born: 1978 (age 47–48); Warsaw, Poland
- Education: Łódź Film School
- Occupations: Director; cinematographer
- Years active: 2000–present
- Partner: Magdalena Różczka
- Children: 2
- Parents: Gustaw Holoubek (father); Magdalena Zawadzka (mother)
- Relatives: Magda Szubanski (cousin)

Jan Holoubek (born 1978) is a Polish director and cinematographer. He is best known for directing the Netflix series The Mire (2018–2024), High Water (2024), and Heweliusz (2025). He also directed the drama film 25 Years of Innocence (2020), which earned him the Polish Academy Award for Best Director.

== Biography ==
Holoubek was born in Warsaw to Polish actors Gustaw Holoubek and Magdalena Zawadzka. The family lived in Mokotów. His mother's cousin is Australian actress Magda Szubanski. In high school, he attended a film club led by director Józef Gębski. In 1997, he moved to Łódź to attend the Łódź Film School, from which he graduated in 2001.

He is in a relationship with actress Magdalena Różczka, whom he met on the set of the television series Medics. They have two daughters.

== Filmography ==
=== Film ===
Year	Title	Director	Cinematographer	Notes	Ref.
2009	Pixels	No	Yes		
2009	Co ja tu robię?	No	Yes		
2010	Słońce i cień	Yes	Yes	Documentary short film	
2012	Supermarket	No	Yes		
2014	Pocztówki z Republiki Absurdu	Yes	Yes		
2015	Król życia	No	Yes		
2016	Po prostu przyjaźń	No	Yes		
2018	Taxing Love	No	Yes		
2019	1800 gramów	No	Yes		
2020	25 Years of Innocence	Yes	No		
2023	Doppelgänger	Yes	No		
2026	Wild, Wild East	Yes	No		
TBA	Escape from the Dark Valley	Yes	No		

=== Television ===
Year	Title	Director	Cinematographer	Notes	Ref.
2009	Naznaczony	No	Yes	4 episodes	
2012	Medics	No	Yes	1 episode	
2015	Prokurator	No	Yes	5 episodes	
2016	Para nie do pary	No	Yes	4 episodes	
2018	Raven	No	Yes	6 episodes	
2018–2021	The Mire	Yes	No	11 episodes	
2019	Odwróceni. Ojcowie i córki	Yes	No	4 episodes	
2022	High Water	Yes	No	Also series' creator; 6 episodes	
2025	Heweliusz	Yes	No	Miniseries	
2026	Wśród nocnej ciszy	Yes	No	Miniseries	

== Awards and nominations ==
Award	Year	Category	Nominated work	Result	Ref.
Gdynia Film Festival	2020	Best Directorial Debut	25 Years of Innocence	Won	
Gdynia Film Festival	2023	Best Director	Doppelgänger	Won	
New Horizons Film Festival	2024	ORKA Postproduction Award	Escape from the Dark Valley	Won	
Polish Film Awards	2021	Best Director	25 Years of Innocence	Won	
Polish Film Awards	2021	Discovery of the Year	25 Years of Innocence	Won	
Polish Film Awards	2022	Best TV Series	The Mire	Won	
Polish Film Awards	2023	Best TV Series	High Water	Won	
Tallinn Black Nights Film Festival	2020	Special Jury Prize	25 Years of Innocence	Won	
