= Bread and Salt (film) =

- Directed by: Damian Kocur
- Screenplay by: Damian Kocur
- Starring: Tymoteusz Bies
- Cinematography: Tomasz Woźniczka
- Release date: 2022
- Language: Polish

Bread and Salt (Polish: Chleb i sól) is a 2022 Polish drama film written and directed by Damian Kocur, in his directorial debut. The film premiered at the Horizons section of the 79th edition of the Venice Film Festival, winning the Special Jury Prize. The film also won the award for best director at the 2022 Antalya Golden Orange Film Festival, and was awarded the Bronze Pyramid at the 2022 Cairo International Film Festival.

== Plot ==
Based on true story. Tymek is a young pianist studying at Chopin University of Music. He returns to his small hometown for vacation to visit his mother, younger brother and his childhood friends. The central meeting spot for the young people is local newly opened kebab bar. Tymek witnesses the growing tension between his friends and the bar employees of Arabic descent, resulting in tragic consequences.

== Cast ==
- Tymoteusz Bies as Tymoteusz
- Jacek Bies as Jacek
