= 2024 Polish Film Awards =

26th Polish Film Awards
- Date: 4 March 2024
- Site: Polish Theatre, Warsaw, Poland
- Hosted by: Karolina Korwin Piotrowska; Błażej Hrapkowicz

Television coverage
- Network: Canal+

The 26th Polish Film Awards took place on 4 March 2024 at the Polish Theatre in Warsaw, Poland. The ceremony honored the best in Polish cinema of 2023, presented by the Polish Film Academy. It was hosted by presenters Karolina Korwin Piotrowska and Błażej Hrapkowicz and broadcast on Canal+.

Drama film Green Border won its sole award, Best Film. Historical drama film Scarborn won the most awards with six, followed by Filip with four and The Peasants with two.

== Winners and nominations ==
The nominations were announced on 8 February 2024. Historical drama film Scarborn led the nominations with sixteen, followed by drama film Doppelgänger and war drama film Filip with thirteen each.

=== Awards ===
Winners are listed first, highlighted in boldface, and indicated with a double dagger (‡).

**Best Film**: **Green Border – Directed by Agnieszka Holland**‡; Doppelgänger – Directed by Jan Holoubek; Filip – Directed by Michał Kwieciński; The Peasants – Directed by DK Welchman and Hugh Welchman; Scarborn – Directed by Paweł Maślona	**Best European Film**: **Triangle of Sadness – Directed by Ruben Östlund (Sweden / Germany / France / United Kingdom)**‡; 20,000 Species of Bees – Directed by Estibaliz Urresola Solaguren (Spain); Aftersun – Directed by Charlotte Wells (United Kingdom / United States); Close – Directed by Lukas Dhont (Belgium / France / Netherlands); Corsage – Directed by Marie Kreutzer (Austria / Germany / Luxembourg / France); The Quiet Girl – Directed by Colm Bairéad (Ireland)
**Best TV Series**: **1670 – Directed by Maciej Buchwald and Kordian Kądziela (Netflix)**‡; Absolute Beginners – Created by Nina Lewandowska and Kamila Tarabura (Netflix); Feedback – Directed by Leszek Dawid (Netflix); Infamy – Created by Anna Maliszewska (Netflix); Warszawianka – Directed by Jacek Borcuch (SkyShowtime)	**Best Director**: **Paweł Maślona – Scarborn**‡; Grzegorz Dębowski – Next to Nothing; Agnieszka Holland – Green Border; Jan Holoubek – Doppelgänger; Michał Kwieciński – Filip
**Best Actor**: **Eryk Kulm – Filip as Filip**‡; Bartosz Bielenia – Scarborn as Ignac Sikora; Jakub Gierszał – Doppelgänger as Józef Wieczorek / Hans Steiner; Leszek Lichota – Forgotten Love as Rafał Wilczur / Antoni Kosiba; Tomasz Włosok – Green Border as Jan	**Best Actress**: **Magdalena Cielecka – Anxiety as Małgorzata**‡; Lena Góra – Imago as Ela; Marta Nieradkiewicz – Anxiety as Łucja; Maja Ostaszewska – Green Border as Julia; Kamila Urzędowska – The Peasants as Jagna
**Best Supporting Actor**: **Tomasz Schuchardt – Doppelgänger as Jan Bitner**‡; Jacek Braciak – Scarborn as Tadeusz Kościuszko; Piotr Pacek – Scarborn as Stanisław Duchnowski; Robert Więckiewicz – Filip as Staszek; Robert Więckiewicz – Scarborn as Dunin	**Best Supporting Actress**: **Agnieszka Grochowska – Scarborn as Maria Giżyńska**‡; Sandra Drzymalska – Filip as Marlena; Katarzyna Herman – Doppelgänger as the lead officer; Ewa Kasprzyk – The Peasants as Dominikowa; Kinga Preis – Feast of Fire as Józefina
**Best Screenplay**: **Scarborn – Michał A. Zieliński**‡; Doppelgänger – Andrzej Gołda; Filip – Michał Kwieciński and Michał Matejkiewicz; Green Border – Maciej Pisuk, Gabriela Łazarkiewicz-Sieczko, and Agnieszka Holland; Next to Nothing – Grzegorz Dębowski	**Best Cinematography**: **Filip – Michał Sobociński**‡; Doppelgänger – Bartłomiej Kaczmarek; Green Border – Tomasz Naumiuk; The Palace – Paweł Edelman; Scarborn – Piotr Sobociński Jr.
**Best Production Design**: **Filip – Katarzyna Sobańska and Marcel Sławiński**‡; Doppelgänger – Marek Warszewski; Forgotten Love – Joanna Macha; Pilecki's Report – Joanna Macha; Scarborn – Anna Anosowicz	**Best Makeup and Hairstyling**: **Scarborn – Aneta Brzozowska**‡; Dangerous Men – Dariusz Krysiak; Doppelgänger – Mirela Zawiszewska and Justyna Osińska; Filip – Dariusz Krysiak; Kleks Academy – Karolina Kordas, Alina Janerka, and Wanda Tatucha-Kędzierzawska; Strawman – Agnieszka Jońca
**Best Costume Design**: **Scarborn – Dorota Roqueplo**‡; Doppelgänger – Weronika Orlińska; Filip – Magdalena Biedrzycka and Justyna Stolarz; Forgotten Love – Małgorzata Zacharska; The Peasants – Katarzyna Lewińska	**Best Film Score**: **The Peasants – L.U.C**‡; Doppelgänger – Jan Komar; Forgotten Love – Paweł Lucewicz; Scarborn – Mikołaj Trzaska; Strawman – Zygmunt Konieczny
**Best Sound**: **Scarborn – Radosław Ochnio, Adam Szlenda, and Filip Krzemień**‡; Doppelgänger – Kacper Habisiak, Marcin Kasiński, and Przemysław Kamieński; Feast of Fire – Leszek Freund; Filip – Filip Krzemień, Marcin Kasiński, and Mariusz Wysocki; Forgotten Love – Robert Czyżewicz; The Peasants – Michał Jankowski; Strawman – Krzysztof Jastrząb	**Best Editing**: **Filip – Nikodem Chabior**‡; Doppelgänger – Rafał Listopad; The Perfect Number – Milenia Fiedler; Scarborn – Piotr Kmiecik; Shreds – Rafał Listopad
**Best Documentary**: **Pianoforte – Directed by Jakub Piątek**‡; Apolonia, Apolonia – Directed by Lea Glob; Faces of Agata – Directed by Małgorzata Kozera; In the Rearview – Directed by Maciek Hamela; Vika! – Directed by Agnieszka Zwiefka	**Discovery of the Year**: **Grzegorz Dębowski – Next to Nothing (Directing)**‡; Michał Kwieciński – Filip (Screenplay); L.U.C – The Peasants (Music); Kamila Urzędowska – The Peasants (Acting); Michał A. Zieliński – Scarborn (Screenplay)
**Audience Award**: **The Peasants**‡; Doppelgänger; Filip; Green Border; Scarborn	**Life Achievement Award**: **Agnieszka Holland**

=== Films with multiple nominations and awards ===
Films that received multiple nominations
Nominations	Film
16	Scarborn
13	Doppelgänger
13	Filip
8	The Peasants
6	Green Border
5	Forgotten Love
3	Next to Nothing
3	Strawman
2	Anxiety
2	Feast of Fire

Films that received multiple awards
Awards	Film
6	Scarborn
4	Filip
2	The Peasants
