= Akson Studio =

Polish film production company

- Founded: 1992; 34 years ago
- Founder: Michał Kwieciński
- Headquarters: Warsaw, Poland
- Key people: Jan Kwieciński (CEO)
- Products: Films; Television series
- Website: aksonstudio.pl

Akson Studio is a Polish film and television production company founded by Michał Kwieciński. Since 1992, it has produced over 100 films and television series, including Katyń by Andrzej Wajda (2007) and Warsaw 44 by Jan Komasa (2014).

== Filmography ==
=== Film ===
Year	Title	Director	Ref.
1999	Egzekutor	Filip Zylber	
2004	The Unburied Man	Márta Mészáros	
2006	Extras	Michał Kwieciński	
2007	Katyń	Andrzej Wajda	
2009	Tatarak	Andrzej Wajda	
2010	Joanna	Feliks Falk	
2010	Beyond the Steppes	Vanja d'Alcantara	
2010	Essential Killing	Jerzy Skolimowski	
2010	Flying Pigs	Anna Kazejak-Dawid	
2012	Shameless	Filip Marczewski	
2013	Walesa: Man of Hope	Andrzej Wajda	
2014	Warsaw 44	Jan Komasa	
2016	Afterimage	Andrzej Wajda	
2017	Panic Attack	Paweł Maślona	
2020	I Never Cry	Piotr Domalewski	
2020	Nobody Sleeps in the Woods Tonight	Bartosz M. Kowalski	
2021	The In-Laws	Jakub Michalczuk	
2021	Nobody Sleeps in the Woods Tonight Part 2	Bartosz M. Kowalski	
2022	Hellhole	Bartosz M. Kowalski	
2023	Filip	Michał Kwieciński	
2023	The In-Laws 2	Kalina Alabrudzińska	
2024	The Love Buzz	Maciej Migas	
2025	The In-Laws 3	Jakub Michalczuk	
2025	13 Days Till Summer	Bartosz M. Kowalski	
2025	Chopin, a Sonata in Paris	Michał Kwieciński	

=== Television ===
Year	Title	Network	Ref.
1999–2009	Rodzina zastępcza	Polsat	
2005–2007	Magda M.	TVN	
2008	Giraffe and Rhino Hotel	TVP1	
2008–2014	Days of Honor	TVP2	
2011–2013	Recipe For Life	TVN	
2012–present	Friends	Polsat	
2013	2XL	Polsat	
2016	Bodo	TVP1	
2017–2022	Wartime Girls	TVP1	
2020–present	Angel of Death	TVN	
2021–present	Sexify	Netflix	
2022	Family Secrets	Netflix	
2023–present	1670	Netflix	
2024	The Bay of Spies	TVP1	
2024	Kiedy ślub?	Canal+ Premium	
2025	Scheda	HBO Max	
2026	The Doll	Netflix	
