= The In-Laws =

The In-Laws may refer to:

- The In-Laws (1979 film), directed by Arthur Hiller and starring Alan Arkin and Peter Falk
- The In-Laws (2003 film), a remake of the 1979 original, directed by Andrew Fleming and starring Michael Douglas and Albert Brooks
- The In-Laws (Polish film), a 2021 Polish comedy film
  - The In-Laws 2, a sequel to the 2021 Polish film
- The In-Laws (TV series), a 2011 drama series broadcast on Mediacorp TV Channel 8

== See also ==
- In-Laws, an American TV sitcom
- In-Laws (Full House of Joy), a 1981 Chinese film
- "In-Laws" (Everybody Loves Raymond), a 1996 television episode
