= Project UFO (2025 TV series) =

Polish television series

- Genre: Thriller drama
- Created by: Kasper Bajon
- Written by: Kasper Bajon
- Directed by: Kasper Bajon
- Starring: Piotr Adamczyk; Mateusz Kościukiewicz; Maja Ostaszewska; Julia Kijowska; Marianna Zydek
- Country of origin: Poland
- Original language: Polish
- No. of seasons: 1
- No. of episodes: 4

Original release
- Network: Netflix
- Release: April 16, 2025

Project UFO (Polish: Projekt UFO) is a Polish science fiction television series produced for and released by Netflix on 16 April 2025. The series, written and directed by Kasper Bajon, follows a UFO investigation in 1980s communist Poland.

== Cast ==
- Piotr Adamczyk as Jan Polgar
- Mateusz Kościukiewicz as Zbigniew Sokolik
- Maja Ostaszewska as Weronika Wierusz
- Julia Kijowska as Julia Borewicz
- Adam Woronowicz as Henryk Wierusz
- Marianna Zydek as Lenta Polgar
- Stanisław Pąk as Józef Kunik

== Reception ==
The series received mixed reviews from critics.
