= Father-in-law (disambiguation) =

Father-in-law is a kinship relationship as a result of marriage.

Father-in-law may also refer to:

- "Father-in-Law", an episode of Yes, Dear
- Father-in-law of Europe, either Christian IX of Denmark or Nicholas I of Montenegro

== See also ==
- In-law (disambiguation)
