= Magdalena Wieczorek =

Polish actress (born 1995)

- Born: 3 November 1995 (age 30); Zielona Góra, Poland
- Education: National Film School in Łódź
- Occupation: Actress
- Years active: 2017–present
- Known for: Zadra; The Last Spark of Hope

Magdalena Wieczorek (born 3 November 1995) is a Polish film and television actress. She played the title role in the musical drama Zadra (2022), for which she was nominated for the Zbyszek Cybulski Award, and was the only performer on screen in the science-fiction film The Last Spark of Hope (2023).

== Early life and education ==
Wieczorek was born on 3 November 1995 in Zielona Góra, where she grew up. Her interest in acting began in primary school, encouraged by a Polish-language teacher who ran the school drama club and entered her in recitation competitions. An early television appearance led to mockery from classmates, after which she set acting aside for several years before returning to it.

After secondary school she was admitted on her first attempt to the acting faculty of the National Film School in Łódź, graduating in 2019. In 2018, at the 36th Festival of Theatre Schools in Łódź, she shared the Grand Prix awarded to the ensemble of the production Spring Awakening and received the Kalejdoskop prize for diction. She later said that her year group at the school experienced the abuses that were publicly reported afterwards.

== Career ==
While still a student, Wieczorek appeared in small roles in the television series Na dobre i na złe and Pierwsza miłość and in the films Czuwaj and Monument. She also worked with the directors Olga Chajdas and Anna Jadowska on the anthology film Erotica 2022.

Her breakthrough came with Zadra (2022), directed by Grzegorz Mołda, in which she played Sandra, a young woman from a housing estate who performs under the name Zadra and takes a job as a hype woman for an established rapper. The part required singing as well as acting, and Wieczorek has said she was frightened rather than pleased on learning she had been cast, because she appeared in every scene. The film premiered at the Gdynia Film Festival, where she gave an impromptu concert for the audience after the screening, and went on general release in Poland on 10 March 2023. Her performance brought a nomination for the Zbyszek Cybulski Award for young Polish actors; the other nominees that year were Jan Hrynkiewicz, Mikołaj Kubacki, Eryk Kulm Jr. and Michalina Łabacz.

In 2023 she was the only actress in The Last Spark of Hope (Polish: W nich cała nadzieja), directed by Piotr Biedroń, playing Ewa, the last surviving human in a post-apocalyptic world, alongside a security robot with artificial intelligence. She was cast after being recommended to the producer and recording a self-tape of a seventeen-page scene at under a day's notice. The low-budget film won the award for best feature film at the science-fiction film festival in Trieste, Italy, and was released in Polish cinemas on 16 November 2023. Wieczorek said she had taken the part partly for its subject, arguing that a science-fiction treatment of global warming could reach a wider audience than a documentary on the same theme.

In 2024 she joined the cast of the crime series Prosta sprawa, adapted from the novel by Wojciech Chmielarz.

== Filmography ==
=== Film ===
Year	Title	Role	Notes
2017	Czuwaj		Minor role
2020	Erotica 2022		Anthology film
2022	Zadra	Sandra / Zadra	Lead role
2023	The Last Spark of Hope	Ewa	Sole on-screen role

=== Television ===
Year	Title	Role
2024	Prosta sprawa	

== Awards and nominations ==
Year	Award	Category	Work	Result	Ref.
2018	36th Festival of Theatre Schools, Łódź	Grand Prix (ensemble)	Spring Awakening	Won	
2018	36th Festival of Theatre Schools, Łódź	Kalejdoskop prize for diction		Won	
2022	Zbyszek Cybulski Award		Zadra	Nominated	
