= Chopin, a Sonata in Paris =

2025 film by Michał Kwieciński

- Polish theatrical release poster
- Polish: Chopin, Chopin!
- Directed by: Michał Kwieciński
- Written by: Bartosz Janiszewski
- Produced by: Michał Kwieciński; Małgorzata Fogel-Gabryś
- Starring: Eryk Kulm; Victor Meutelet; Joséphine de La Baume; Lambert Wilson
- Cinematography: Michał Sobociński
- Production company: Akson Studio
- Distributed by: TVP
- Release dates: 22 September 2025 (Gdynia); 10 October 2025 (Poland)
- Running time: 133 minutes
- Country: Poland
- Languages: Polish; French; Spanish
- Budget: PLN 72 million

Chopin, a Sonata in Paris (Polish: Chopin, Chopin!) is a 2025 Polish period biographical drama film directed by Michał Kwieciński. Starring Eryk Kulm as Frédéric Chopin, it follows the life of Chopin in the 1830s. It opened the Polish Film Festival on 22 September 2025 and received a theatrical release in Poland on 10 October 2025.

== Cast ==
- Eryk Kulm as Frédéric Chopin
- Lambert Wilson as Louis Philippe I
- Joséphine de La Baume as George Sand
- Victor Meutelet as Franz Liszt
- Maja Ostaszewska as Tekla Justyna Chopin
- Karolina Gruszka as Delfina Potocka
- Michał Pawlik as Jan Matuszyński
- Kamil Szeptycki as Julian Fontana
- Martyna Byczkowska as Maria Wodzińska
- Dominika Ostałowska as Madame Wodzińska

== Production ==
=== Development ===
The film was announced in March 2024. Director Michał Kwieciński had previously worked with Eryk Kulm on his 2022 film, Filip. When Kulm expressed that Frédéric Chopin was his dream role, Kwieciński began researching the composer. He was inspired by Joachim Trier's 2021 film The Worst Person in the World in deciding to present Chopin's life in distinct vignettes.

With a budget of PLN 72 million, it is one of the most expensive productions in Polish history.

=== Casting ===
Eryk Kulm joined the cast in June 2024. To prepare for the role, he read two extensive biographies about Chopin. He also spent three months learning piano pieces by Chopin to play in the film. Pianist Janusz Olejniczak oversaw Kulm's musical preparations. Lambert Wilson was announced as a cast member on 29 August 2024.

=== Filming ===
The film was shot over four months, and required the work of 260 actors, 5,000 extras, and 600 crew members. Principal photography began in Poland in August 2024. In late August and early September, filming took place in Roztoka, Żelazno, Lubiąż, and Żagań. From 21 September to 25 September 2024, filming took place in Łódź, including Izrael Poznański Palace. Filming took place in Bordeaux from 7 October to 26 October 2024. On 29 October 2024, filming began in Mallorca. Filming took place in Szczawno-Zdrój, Bolków, and Wrocław in December 2024.

== Release ==
The film opened the Polish Film Festival on 22 September 2025. It received a theatrical release in Poland by TVP Dystrybucja Kinowa on 10 October 2025.

== Reception ==
=== Accolades ===
Award	Date of ceremony	Category	Recipient(s)	Result	Ref.
Camerimage	22 November 2025	Golden Frog	Michał Sobociński	Nominated	
Camerimage	22 November 2025	Bronze Frog	Michał Sobociński	Won	
Polish Film Festival	25 September 2025	Best Film	Michał Kwieciński	Nominated	
Polish Film Festival	25 September 2025	Best Production Design	Katarzyna Sobańska, Marcel Sławiński	Won	
Polish Film Festival	25 September 2025	Best Costume Design	Magdalena Biedrzycka, Justyna Stolarz	Won	
Polish Film Awards	9 March 2026	Best Actor	Eryk Kulm	Nominated	
Polish Film Awards	9 March 2026	Best Supporting Actress	Karolina Gruszka	Nominated	
Polish Film Awards	9 March 2026	Best Cinematography	Michał Sobociński	Nominated	
Polish Film Awards	9 March 2026	Best Sound	Marcin Matlak, Marcin Kasiński, Filip Krzemień	Won	
Polish Film Awards	9 March 2026	Best Editing	Bartłomiej Piasek, Piotr Wójcik	Nominated	
Polish Film Awards	9 March 2026	Best Costume Design	Magdalena Biedrzycka, Justyna Stolarz	Won	
Polish Film Awards	9 March 2026	Best Makeup	Dariusz Krysiak	Won	
Polish Film Awards	9 March 2026	Best Production Design	Katarzyna Sobańska, Marcel Sławiński	Won	
