= Son-in-law (disambiguation) =

Son-in-law is a kinship relationship as a result of marriage.

Son-in-law may also refer to:

- Son in Law (film), a 1993 American comedy film
- Son-in-Law (horse) (1911–1941), British Thoroughbred racehorse
- "Son-in-Law" (8 Simple Rules episode), an episode from Season 1 of the American sitcom 8 Simple Rules

== See also ==
- In-law (disambiguation)
- Kinship terminology
