= Days of Honor =

Polish World War II television drama series

- Also known as: Time of Honor
- Polish: Czas honoru
- Genre: War
- Created by: Jarosław Sokół; Ewa Wencel
- Written by: Jarosław Sokół; Ewa Wencel; Jerzy Matysiak
- Directed by: Michał Kwieciński; Michał Rosa; Wojciech Wójcik; Grzegorz Kuczeriszka; Waldemar Krzystek; Michał Rogalski
- Starring: Jan Wieczorkowski; Antoni Pawlicki; Maciej Zakościelny; Jakub Wesołowski
- Composer: Bartosz Chajdecki
- Country of origin: Poland
- Original language: Polish
- No. of series: 7
- No. of episodes: 90

Production
- Producer: Magdalena Badura
- Cinematography: Piotr Wojtowicz; Grzegorz Kuczeriszka; Paweł Flis
- Running time: 50 minutes

Original release
- Network: TVP2
- Release: 7 September 2008 – 23 November 2014

Days of Honour (Polish: Czas honoru) is a Polish World War II television drama series, broadcast on TVP2 from 7 September 2008 to 23 November 2014, on STV Glasgow from 2 June 2014 and STV Edinburgh from 16 January 2015.

== Plot ==
Set in German-occupied Poland 1939–1944 (series I, II, III, IV and VII) and in post-war Poland 1945–1946 (series V and VI), the series tells a story of Union of Armed Struggle/Armia Krajowa/Armed Forces Delegation for Poland soldiers commonly referred to as cichociemni. The script was inspired by the stories of Polish soldiers who during World War II underwent training in the UK in order to return to German-occupied Poland and partake in the underground struggle for independence. The series also touches upon the challenges faced by the German military intelligence organisation Abwehr, the intelligence agency of the SS Sicherheitsdienst des Reichsführers-SS (SD), the Nazi secret police commonly known as the Gestapo and the infiltration of the Union of Armed Struggle/Armia Krajowa by the Abwehr and the SD. The series also briefly covers the activities of the Soviet Main Intelligence Directorate (GRU) and the NKVD.

Until 2013 six series of 13 episodes each were made. Series I, II and III take place in the spring, summer and autumn of 1941. Series IV covers the period from April to June 1944. The action takes place mainly in Warsaw, including the Warsaw Ghetto, however some parts of the series are set in other areas of the General Government, as well as England, Italy and the Third Reich. Series V tells the story of the final period of World War II and shortly after its end, from April to June 1945, and is set in the newly instated People's Republic of Poland, Czechoslovakia and the American zone of the Allied-occupied West Germany. The action of series I to VI unfolds in the chronological order. Series VII, however, takes it back to 1944 and shows the events of the Warsaw Uprising, the 70th anniversary of which were celebrated in 2014.

== Cast ==
- Jan Wieczorkowski as Władek Konarski
- Antoni Pawlicki as Janek Markiewicz
- Maciej Zakościelny as Bronek Wojciechowski
- Jakub Wesołowski as Michał Konarski
- Krystian Wieczorek as Martin Halbe (series 1 to 3)
- Piotr Adamczyk as Lars Rainer (from series 2)
- Katarzyna Gniewkowska as Maria Konarska
- Jan Englert as Czesław Konarski (series 1)
- Robert Gonera as Aleksey Dykov (series 4)
- Maja Ostaszewska (series 1) and Magdalena Różczka (from series 2) as Wanda Ryszkowska
- Agnieszka Więdłocha as Lena Sajkowska
- Piotr Żurawski as Romek Sajkowski
- Krzysztof Globisz as Leon Sajkowski (series 1 to 3)
- Anna Romantowska as Sabina Sajkowska (series 1 to 3)
- Ewa Wencel as Helena
- Karolina Gorczyca as Wiktoria "Ruda" Rudnicka
- Olga Bołądź as Celina Dłużewska
- Krzysztof Stelmaszyk as Gerd Keller
- Danuta Stenka as Margaret
- Łukasz Konopka as Karol Ryszkowski
- Mariusz Kiljan as Woźniak
- Zuzanna Grabowska as Nina Jacewicz
- Magdalena Boczarska as Karolina Osmanska/Lola
- Roman Gancarczyk as Janusz Baranowski
- Przemysław Bluszcz as scharfuhrer Uwe Rappke
- Arkadiusz Detmer as Mosler
- Paweł Małaszyński as hauptmann Johann von Relatzki vel Tadeusz Kruczek
- Daniel Olbrychski as "Doktor"
- Ksawery Szlenkier as Krzysztof
- Mariusz Jakus as Gestapo officer "Mongol" in the ghetto
- Mateusz Janicki as Staszek Markiewicz, Janek's brother
- Magdalena Kuta as nun Józefa
- Mirosław Baka as Sorokin
- Tomasz Dedek as obersturmbannfuhrer Josef Tannenberg
- Olgierd Łukaszewicz as Antoni Żelichowski
- Wojciech Majchrzak as Tomasz Krawicz "Krawiec"
- Michał Meyer as Antek
- Karolina Gruszka as Inga Neuman
- Weronika Rosati as Rojza
- Wojciech Brzeziński as scharfuhrer Helmut Fuchs
- Tadeusz Huk as Stanisław Wojciechowski, Bronek's father
- Robert Kozyra as gruppenfuhrer Ludwik Fischer
- Hubert Urbański as colonel Mieczysław Skotnicki "Rybak"
- Leszek Lichota as Warecki or Wysocki
- Bartosz Gelner as Alan Krawczyk
- Jacek Mikołajczak as Otto Kurchner
- Magdalena Cielecka as Ada Lewińska
- Jan Frycz as Kazimierz Korytowski "Zawisza"
- Adam Woronowicz as Leon Wasilewski
- Eryk Lubos as Lebiediew
- Sonia Bohosiewicz as Emilia
- Piotr Biedroń as Adam Kosowski
- Antoni Królikowski as Kamil

Source.

== Episodes ==
Series 1 Episode 1

Spring 1941. A small division of Polish soldiers are completing their training in England and are about to be parachuted back to occupied Poland in order to carry out sabotage actions against the Germans. The members of the division are: Czesław Konarski, major of the Polish Armed Forces; his two sons - Władek, sportsman and lieutenant of the Polish Armed Forces, and Michał, medical student; Jan Markiewicz, an architecture graduate from Praga in Warsaw, and Bronek Woyciechowski - before the war the only heir to the fortune of a Warsaw businessman. In the meantime the Gestapo are setting a trap...

== Reception ==
The series broadcast by Telewizja Polska enjoyed huge popularity in Poland and the licence to screen it has been purchased by broadcasters in Italy, China, Montenegro and Scotland.

Episode	Series I	Episode	Series II	Episode	Series III	Episode	Series IV	Episode	Series V
1	2 374 829 (7 September 2008)	14	1 957 005 (13 September 2009)	27	2 579 780 (19 September 2010)	40	1 792 427 (4 September 2011)	53	2 546 671 (2 September 2012)
2	2 779 612 (14 September 2008)	15	2 723 292 (20 September 2009)	28	2 186 819 (26 September 2010)	41	1 921 136 (11 September 2011)	54	(9 September 2012)
3	2 661 177 (21 September 2008)	16	2 484 669 (27 September 2009)	29	2 400 921 (3 September 2010)	42	2 134 995 (18 September 2011)	55	(16 September 2012)
4	2 636 936 (28 September 2008)	17	2 431 296 (4 October 2009)	30	2 317 347 (10 October 2010)	43	2 097 357 (25 September 2011)	56	(23 September 2012)
5	2 450 266 (5 October 2008)	18	2 548 605 (11 October 2009)	31	2 338 483 (17 October 2010)	44	2 198 896 (2 October 2011)	57	(30 September 2012)
6	2 734 763 (12 October 2008)	19	2 570 359 (18 October 2009)	32	2 541 287 (24 October 2010)	45	1 852 304 (9 October 2011)	58	(7 October 2012)
7	2 924 582 (19 October 2008)	20	2 715 192 (25 October 2009)	33	2 382 953 (31 October 2010)	46	2 316 992 (16 October 2011)	59	(14 October 2012)
8	2 991 339 (26 October 2008)	21	2 302 843 (1 November 2009)	34	2 191 317 (7 November 2010)	47	2 343 521 (23 October 2011)	60	(21 October 2012)
9	3 174 016 (2 November 2008)	22	2 607 353 (8 November 2009)	35	2 430 812 (14 November 2010)	48	2 115 675 (30 October 2011)	61	(28 October 2012)
10	2 985 221 (9 November 2008)	23	2 582 886 (15 November 2009)	36	2 352 544 (21 November 2010)	49	2 218 107 (6 November 2011)	62	(4 November 2012)
11	3 067 624 (16 November 2008)	24	2 577 587 (22 November 2009)	37	2 216 147 (28 November 2010)	50	2 304 271 (13 November 2011)	63	(11 November 2012)
12	3 045 435 (23 November 2008)	25	2 690 971 (29 November 2009)	38	2 844 672 (5 December 2010)	51	2 586 367 (20 November 2011)	64	(18 November 2012)
13	3 433 103 (30 November 2008)	26	3 454 695 (6 December 2009)	39	2 953 950 (12 December 2010)	52	2 412 923 (27 November 2011)	65	(25 November 2012)
Average audience	2 861 265	Average audience	2 595 919	Average audience	2 444 128	Average audience	2 176 058	Average audience	?
