= Katyń (film) =

- Polish release poster
- Directed by: Andrzej Wajda
- Written by: Andrzej Wajda; Władysław Pasikowski; Przemysław Nowakowski
- Based on: Post Mortem: The Story of Katyn by Andrzej Mularczyk
- Produced by: Michał Kwieciński
- Starring: Andrzej Chyra; Maja Ostaszewska; Artur Żmijewski; Danuta Stenka; Jan Englert; Magdalena Cielecka; Agnieszka Glińska; Paweł Małaszyński; Maja Komorowska; Władysław Kowalski; Sergei Garmash
- Cinematography: Paweł Edelman
- Edited by: Milenia Fiedler; Rafał Listopad
- Music by: Krzysztof Penderecki
- Production company: Akson Studio
- Distributed by: ITI Cinema
- Release date: September 17, 2007
- Running time: 115 minutes
- Country: Poland
- Languages: Polish; Russian; German
- Budget: 15,000,000 PLN €4,000,000
- Box office: $14,768,451

Katyń (Polish pronunciation: [ˈkatɨɲ]) is a 2007 Polish historical drama film about the 1940 Katyn massacre, directed by Andrzej Wajda. It is based on the book Post Mortem: The Story of Katyn by Andrzej Mularczyk. It was nominated for Best Foreign Language Film for the 80th Academy Awards.

== Plot ==
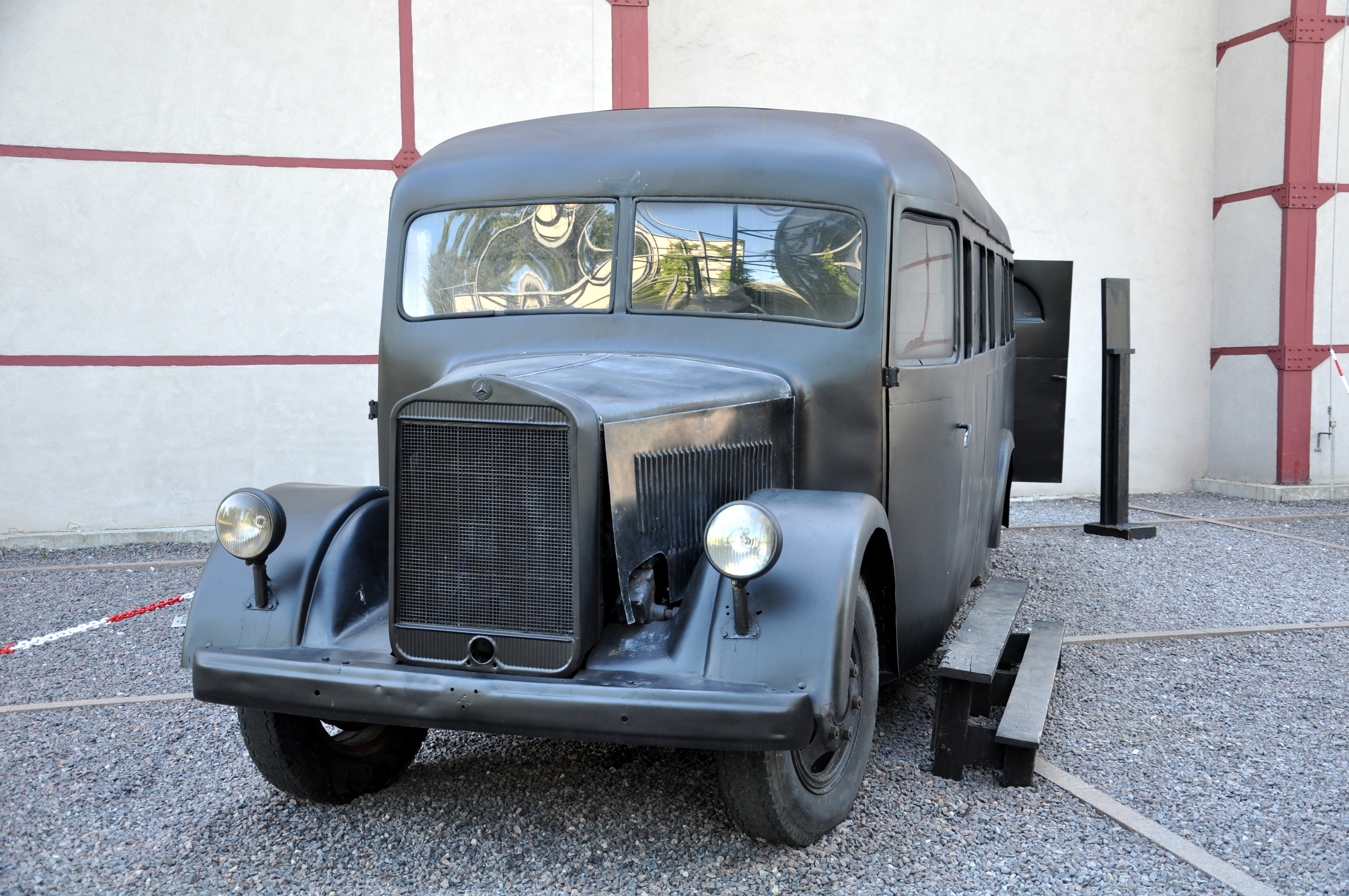
A German-made prison bus used by the NKVD for transport of prisoners; the bus was reconstructed for the purpose of the film.

The events of Katyń are relayed through the eyes of the women, the mothers, wives, and daughters of the victims executed on Stalin's orders by the NKVD in 1940.

Andrzej (Artur Zmijewski) is a young Polish captain in the 8th Uhlan Regiment of Prince Józef Poniatowski, who keeps a detailed diary. In September 1939, following the Soviet invasion of Eastern Poland, he is taken prisoner by the Red Army, which separates the officers from the enlisted men, who are allowed to return home, while the officers are held. His wife Anna (Maja Ostaszewska) and daughter Weronika, nicknamed "Nika" (Wiktoria Gąsiewska), find him shortly before he is deported to the USSR. Presented with an opportunity to escape, he refuses on the basis of his oath of loyalty to the Polish military.

Helped by a sympathetic Russian officer, Anna manages to return to the family's home in Kraków with her daughter. There, the Germans carry out Sonderaktion Krakau, shutting down Jagiellonian University and deporting professors to concentration camps. Andrzej's father is one of the professors deported; later, his wife gets a message that he died in a camp in 1941.

In a prisoner of war camp, Andrzej is detained for a while and continues to keep a diary. He carefully records the names of all his fellow officers who are removed from the camp, and the dates on which they are taken. During the winter, Andrzej is clearly suffering in the low temperature, and his colleague Jerzy (Andrzej Chyra) lends him an extra sweater. As it happens, the sweater has Jerzy's name written on it. Finally, Andrzej's is taken from the camp, while Jerzy is left behind.

In 1943, the population of Kraków is informed by the German occupation authorities about the Katyn massacre. Capitalizing on the Soviet war crime, Nazi propaganda publishes lists with the names of the victims exhumed in mass graves behind the advancing German troops. Andrzej's name is not on the list, giving his wife and daughter hope.

After the war, Jerzy, who has survived, has enlisted in the Polish People's Army (LWP), which is under the complete control of the pro-Soviet Polish United Workers' Party. He feels personal loyalty to his friends, loves his country, and has sympathy for those who have suffered. He visits Anna and her daughter to tell them that Andrzej is dead. Apparently, when the list of the names of the victims was compiled, Andrzej was misidentified as Jerzy on the basis of the name in the sweater that Jerzy had lent to Andrzej; it was Andrzej who was killed, not Jerzy. Despondent that he is now forced to acknowledge a lie and to serve those who killed his comrades in Katyn, Jerzy commits suicide.

Evidence of Soviet responsibility for the Katyn massacre is carefully concealed by the authorities. However, a few daring people working with the effects of the victims eventually deliver Andrzej's diary to his widow Anna. The diary clearly shows the date in 1940 when he must have been killed from the absence of entries on subsequent days. The date of the massacre is crucial for assigning responsibility: if it happened in 1940, the USSR controlled the territory, while by mid-1941 the Germans took control over it.

The film ends with a re-enactment of parts of the massacre, as several of the principal characters are executed along with other soldiers.

The film includes excerpts from German newsreels presenting the Katyn massacre as a Soviet crime, and excerpts from Soviet newsreels presenting the massacre as a German crime.

== Cast ==
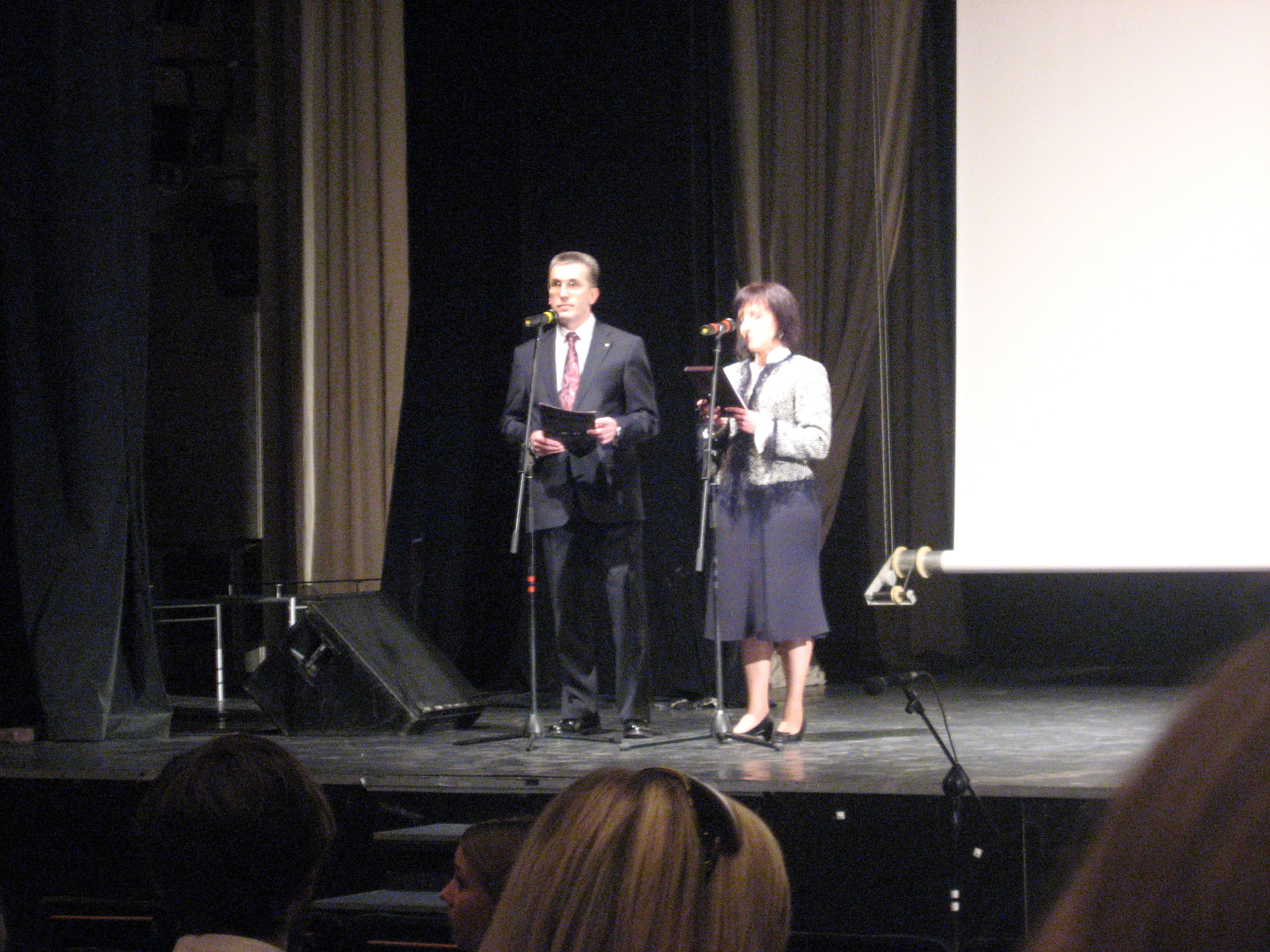
Speech before projection in Riga

- Andrzej Chyra, as Jerzy – Porucznik (1st Lieutenant) in the 8th Uhlan Regiment
- Artur Żmijewski, as Andrzej – Rotmistrz (Captain) of 8th Uhlan Regiment
- Maja Ostaszewska, as Anna, wife of Andrzej
- Wiktoria Gąsiewska, as Weronika ("Nika"), daughter of Andrzej and Anna
- Władysław Kowalski, as Jan, father of Andrzej and a professor at the Kraków University
- Maja Komorowska, as Maria, mother of Andrzej
- Jan Englert, as General
- Danuta Stenka, as Róża, wife of the General
- Sergei Garmash, as Captain Popov - a sympathetic and protective Red Army officer
- Agnieszka Kawiorska, as Ewa, daughter of General and Róża
- Stanisława Celińska, as Stasia – a servant in the General's house
- Paweł Małaszyński, as Piotr Baszkowski, a lieutenant (porucznik pilot) with 1 Aviation Regiment, Dęblin
- Magdalena Cielecka, as sister of Piotr
- Agnieszka Glińska, as sister of Piotr
- Anna Radwan, as Elżbieta – a relative of Anna
- Antoni Pawlicki, as Tadeusz, son of Elżbieta
- Alicja Dąbrowska, as an actress
- Jakub Przebindowski, as priest Wikary
- Krzysztof Globisz, as a medical doctor
- Oleh Drach, as a commissar
- Jacek Braciak, as a lieutenant Klin

== Production ==
The director of Katyń, Andrzej Wajda, undertook the production of a film about the Katyń massacre for personal reasons. His father, Jakub Wajda—an officer who participated in Poland's defensive war—was murdered in 1940 in Kharkiv, and Andrzej Wajda did not learn the truth about his fate until the late 1980s. For a long time, however, Wajda lacked a literary starting point. After 1989, the only artistic works addressing the Katyń massacre remained Zbigniew Herbert’s Guziki (Buttons) and fragments of Krzysztof Penderecki’s Polish Requiem; there were plans to utilize the prose of Włodzimierz Odojewski, but ultimately, the adapted source material chosen was Andrzej Mularczyk’s film novella Post mortem. Wajda also drew inspiration from the diary of Major Adam Solski, which was made available to the murdered officer's family only in 1989, thanks to Zbigniew Brzezinski. Excerpts from the diary were quoted directly in the film's screenplay. In addition to Wajda, Władysław Pasikowski and Przemysław Nowakowski participated in the work on the screenplay.

Selecting the main protagonists for a film about the Katyń massacre also presented a challenge. Wajda decided that the actual act of executing the Polish soldiers would remain on the periphery of the overall narrative. The director admitted that he found it easiest to adopt the perspective of his own mother, who had waited in vain for his father's return. Consequently, the majority of the film's action is devoted to the women. Danuta Stenka played General Smorawińska, who refuses to participate in Nazi anti-Soviet propaganda. Maja Komorowska appeared in the role of Captain Andrzej’s mother, while Agnieszka—portrayed by Magdalena Cielecka—was styled as a wartime Antigone, striving to secure for her murdered brother at least a semblance of a grave.

=== Filming ===
The cinematography for Katyń was handled by the acclaimed cinematographer Paweł Edelman, for whom Wajda’s film marked an opportunity to return to the film industry after a three-year hiatus. The film's costumes were created by Magdalena Biedrzycka in collaboration with Andrzej Szenajch, while the production design was developed by Magdalena Dipont. Filming began on October 3, 2006, and ended on January 9, 2007. The total budget for Katyń amounted to nearly 15 million PLN.

Exterior scenes were filmed at the following locations:

- Jarosław,
- the railway bridge in Wyszków,
- the Poświętne commune (St. Joseph's Church in Studzianna),
- Kasina Wielka,
- Warsaw (Solariego Street, the Citadel, 11 Listopada Street, the ZASP building on Ujazdowskie Avenue, Złota Street, Senatorska Street, Oczki Street),
- Zielonka,
- the Wesoła training ground (serving as the cinematic Katyń Forest),
- Kraków (Main Market Square, Poselska Street, the Planty Park, St. Mark's Street, the Słowacki Theatre, Dolnych Młynów Street, Grottgera Street, the Academy of Music, Kanonicza Street, Senacka Street, Jagiellonian University, Salwator Cemetery),
- the vicinity of Jarosław (serving as the cinematic Kozelsk),
- Stary Dzików,
- Konstancin-Jeziorna (the "Hugonówka" villa),
- Góra Kalwaria

=== Historical background ===
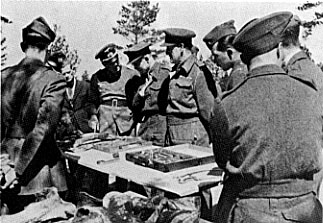
German officers present their findings regarding Katyn to captured Allied officers in 1943.

Six months before the massacres at Katyn, on August 23, 1939, Soviet leader Joseph Stalin authorized the signing of the Molotov–Ribbentrop Pact, a non-aggression agreement with Adolf Hitler’s Nazi Germany with a secret protocol to partition and annex Eastern Europe. Within days, German troops invaded western Poland, the first action aimed at fulfilling Hitler’s ultimate goal of "Lebensraum". Within days, the Soviet Union invaded eastern Poland, a region historically at odds with its former rival, Tsarist Russia. Hundreds of thousands of Poles, including soldiers, officers and civilians were incarcerated or transported to the Soviet Union.

=== Executions of prisoners ===
In early 1940, the head of the Russian secret police (NKVD), Lavrentiy Beria, was authorized by Stalin to liquidate selected prisoners. Most of the victims were murdered in the Katyn forest near Smolensk, Russia, at Kalinin (Tver), and at Kharkov prison, where Wajda’s father, a Polish cavalry officer, was executed.

Over 20,000 members of Poland’s intelligentsia and military forces were slaughtered, usually by a bullet to the head. Stalin’s rationale for the extermination of Polish executive and military staff was that it eliminated social and political elements that may have organized opposition to his policies.

When the Germans had established military bases in Poland, Hitler launched his invasion of the Soviet Union—Operation Barbarossa—which would kill many Russian civilians and soldiers.

== Reception ==
=== Cinema attendance and distribution issues ===
The film’s gala premiere took place on September 17, 2007, in Warsaw, marking the 68th anniversary of the 1939 Soviet invasion of Poland. The premiere's commemoration was a “major political event”, attended by members of the Polish political establishment. Historian Stefan Steinberg writes:

The Polish president, Lech Kaczynski, and the prime minister, his brother Jaroslaw Kaczynski, attended, alongside high-ranking officials of the Catholic Church. A candlelit vigil, was also held at the Tomb of the Unknown Soldier in Warsaw, where the names of the Polish officers murdered at Katyń were read out…Students and army recruits were then ordered to see the film and the Kaczynski brothers sought to exploit the latter during their ultra-nationalist campaign in the Polish parliamentary elections.”

Wajda acknowledged in his production notes that President Kaczynski had provided “honorary patronage” during the film’s production. Though Wajda reassured Berlin journalists that Katyń was not conceived as anti-Russian propaganda, conservative German chancellor, Angela Merkel attended its premiere.

Wajda ultimately registered a formal objection to President Kaczynski regarding the politicizing of Katyń. In one of his last interviews, shortly before his death in 2016, Wajda declared:

“We are now facing attempts by the authorities to intervene in art. They talk about what national art should be or what it shouldn’t be. I’ve made a film about the events of the past, with the message that interference in art is not a task for the authorities. It is a job of the artists, not the government.”

According to estimates by the Polish Filmmakers Association, approximately 2.8 million viewers attended cinema screenings of Wajda’s film. However, the film struggled to secure international distribution (outside of the festival circuit). Wajda claimed that the distribution of Katyń abroad—even on DVD and Blu-ray—was deliberately blocked by the management of Polish Television (TVP), which was dominated by decision-makers from the Law and Justice (PiS), League of Polish Families (LPR), and Self-Defence (Samoobrona) parties who were hostile toward the director. Katyń was not released in Western European countries until 2009, and international viewership was limited. According to the JPBox-Office website, the film was seen by 25,000 viewers in France and over 49,000 in Spain. Estimated theatrical revenue ranged—depending on the source—from $11.9 million to $14.7 million, with the vast majority generated by cinemas in Poland.

Low cinema attendance for Katyń in Western Europe was also due to ideological factors; The Italian company Movimento Film failed to reach an agreement with the TVP representative, and the film could not be screened at the Venice Film Festival—a situation some conservative Italian film critics attributed to the festival's left-wing organizers' reluctance to accept the message conveyed by Katyń. Katyń also sparked controversy in France that hindered its distribution; Jean-Luc Douin of Le Monde attacked the film, accusing Wajda of holding the Nazis and Soviets equally responsible for the destruction of Poland and failing to make any mention of the Holocaust. Responding to Douin’s charge, Adam Michnik wrote that it was "as absurd as accusing Spielberg of failing to include the Katyń massacre and the Kolyma gulags in Schindler’s List". Ryszard Czarnecki argued that "this review illustrates the mindset of Western—and not just French—left-wing elites, who believed that while Stalin made mistakes, his general direction was right". In April 2009, the authorities of the People's Republic of China banned the movie from being distributed in the country "because its ideology does not align with the authorities' official point of view". However, imported copies are widely available.

=== Polish critical reception ===
In Poland, Katyń received mixed reviews from critics. Paweł T. Felis of Gazeta Wyborcza stated that Wajda’s film "is not a great film, as some would have it, but neither is it a complete failure, as others claim". Felis was disappointed by what he described as the absence of Wajda’s characteristic engagement with the Romantic myths of Polish heroism, yet he appreciated the film’s suggestion that "the Katyń massacre struck at our most sensitive spot—our chivalric ethos". Tadeusz Sobolewski, meanwhile, expressed the view that "Wajda touched upon an unresolved knot in post-war Polish existence". Writing for Polityka, Zdzisław Pietrasik wrote that while "the screenplay—the result of a long process of work and consultation—is not the film’s strongest point," the episodic nature of the narrative served the concept of an "epic depicting collective fates". In her review for Dziennik, Elżbieta Ciapara wrote that "some plot threads lose focus" and that the film became artificial in its second half (particularly in the scene of Tadeusz’s death, modeled on Wajda’s Ashes and Diamonds); however, she found that the film compensated for these shortcomings by showing "how the Katyń massacre was exploited for propaganda purposes".

A particular focus of critical attention in Poland was the film’s portrayal of the Soviets. Right-wing commentator Krzysztof Kłopotowski wrote in Rzeczpospolita that Katyń was permeated by a "fear of offending post-communist, European, and social norms of political correctness"—a sentiment allegedly reflected in the portrayal of the Soviets as fellow victims of Stalinist totalitarianism rather than as full-fledged perpetrators of the crime. Writing in Nasz Dziennik, Jerzy Szaniawski leveled a similar charge against Wajda: "there are essentially no 'bad Russians' in the film. There are only extras—NKVD executioners who remain completely anonymous". The criticism voiced by Kłopotowski and other right-wing commentators was partly motivated by the accusation that Wajda had blocked the production of another film about the Katyń massacre—one that Robert Gliński had intended to make. However, Elżbieta Ciapara did not criticize the film’s portrayal of the Soviets: "Katyń is an indictment of a criminal, totalitarian regime. The executioners in the film are nameless. The camera rarely shows their faces. Only in the finale, as successive Poles fall into the hands of their tormentors, does a portrait of Stalin appear on screen. It was on his orders that over ten thousand Poles were murdered". On the other hand, Wiesław Kot of the magazine Wprost dismissed Katyń as little more than a "lofty television-style production laced with elements of political blackmail". Elżbieta Ostrowska wrote that Katyń employs an inconsistently applied aesthetic of "melodramatic affect". Monika Nahlik criticized the film for its "anachronism, reliance on Romantic myths, simplified characterization, and formulaic nature," and argued that "the film as a whole […] was subordinated to extra-cinematic values: commemorating national suffering, fostering patriotism, and broadening historical knowledge"—even though, at the time Wajda’s work was created, those values were entirely alien to audiences.

=== United States critical reception ===
Katyń was received quite differently in the United States. Katyń has an approval rating of 91% on review aggregator website Rotten Tomatoes, based on 68 reviews, with an average rating of 7.3/10. The website's critical consensus states, "Masterfully crafted by an experienced directorial hand, Katyn is a powerful, personal depiction of wartime tragedy". It also has a score of 81 out of 100 on Metacritic, based on 17 critics, indicating "universal acclaim". In an enthusiastic review for The New Yorker, David Denby wrote that in the scene depicting the execution of Polish officers, "Wajda has created one of the most powerful evocations of a macabre twentieth-century ritual; we also know that only in a free Poland could he have created this particular spectacle". Roger Ebert wrote that "the film ends with a scene of unrelenting nightmare, showing executions on an almost assembly-line scale". In a review for The New York Times, A. O. Scott wrote appreciatively that "Mr. Wajda is too honest and sensitive a filmmaker to promise a redemptive ending. Instead, he focuses on the grief and disorientation of his characters, as well as the tenacity with which they cling to the dignity of which history strips them. The result is a dignified, thoughtful film, devoid of sentimentality and all the more devastating for it".

=== Russian reception ===
In Russia, where Katyń was screened on the Rossiya K channel prior to the 70th anniversary of the Katyń massacre (drawing a 1.5% audience share), the film received generally positive reviews. A debate reignited among historians and commentators regarding this long-concealed episode in Soviet history; this debate intensified further following the crash of the Polish Tu-154 in Smolensk on April 10, 2010, which claimed the lives of a delegation—led by President Lech Kaczyński—that had intended to commemorate the anniversary. The day after the crash, Katyń was broadcast on the Rossiya 1 channel (drawing a 4.4% audience share), immediately following the main Vesti news program. At the time of the broadcast, Rossiya 1 drew an audience of 2.8 million viewers. However, as a result of mounting diplomatic tensions between Poland and Russia, Katyń was placed on a list of films barred from official distribution in 2015; when the Memorial Society planned to screen Wajda’s film in St. Petersburg, the local prosecutor’s office intervened at the behest of the Russian Ministry of Culture.

== Awards ==
Year	Festival	Award	Recipient	Result
2007	Polish Cinemas Association	Diamond Ticket	Katyń	Won
2008	Academy Awards	Best Foreign Language Film	Katyń	Nominated
2008	Polish Film Academy	Eagle Award for Best Film	Katyń	Won
2008	Polish Film Academy	Eagle Award for Best Cinematography	Paweł Edelman	Won
2008	Polish Film Academy	Eagle Award for Best Production Design	Magdalena Dipont	Won
2008	Polish Film Academy	Eagle Award for Best Costumes	Magdalena Biedrzycka, Andrzej Szenajch	Won
2008	Polish Film Academy	Eagle Award for Best Music	Krzysztof Penderecki	Won
2008	Polish Film Academy	Eagle Award for Best Sound	Jacek Hamela	Nominated
2008	Polish Film Academy	Eagle Award for Best Supporting Actress	Danuta Stenka	Won
2008	Polish Film Academy	Eagle Award for Best Director	Andrzej Wajda	Nominated
2008	Polish Film Academy	Eagle Award for Best Editing	Milenia Fiedler, Rafał Listopad	Nominated
2008	Polish Film Academy	Eagle Award for Best Leading Actor	Andrzej Chyra	Nominated
2008	Polish Film Academy	Eagle Award for Best Supporting Actor	Artur Żmijewski	Nominated
2008	Washington International Film Festival	Audience Award	Katyń	Won
2008	Polish Film Festival	Amber Lions	Katyń	Won
2008	European Film Academy	European Film Award for Best Costume Design	Magdalena Biedrzycka	Won
2008	Film	Golden Duck for Best Cinematography	Paweł Edelman	Won
2008	Denver International Film Festival	Audience Award	Katyń	Won
2010	"Vistula" Polish Film Festival in Moscow	Special Award	Katyń	Won

== Controversy ==
During the post-war era Soviet authorities in Poland suppressed the historical truth surrounding the events at Katyn. Dorota Niemtz writes:

For decades, any discussion of the slaughter carried out in Katyń was forbidden in postwar Stalinist Poland, while in the Soviet Union itself, blame for the atrocity was laid on German troops following the breach of the Molotov–Ribbentrop pact by Hitler.”

Not until 1989, with the fall of Communism in Poland in 1989, did the first non-communist Polish government acknowledge that the crime was committed under the direction of Joseph Stalin. In 1990, Mikhail Gorbachev acknowledged Soviet responsibility for the Katyń massacre for the first time. In 1991, Boris Yeltsin made public the documents which had authorized the massacre.

On September 18, 2007, Rossiyskaya Gazeta, the official newspaper of the Russian government, published an article by Alexander Sabov claiming that the widely accepted version of the tragedy is based on a single dubious copy of a document related to the massacre, and hence the evidence for the Soviet responsibility would be unreliable. This prompted an immediate response from the Polish media. As a retort, the next day, Gazeta Wyborcza emphasized the formal admission by the Soviet Union of NKVD responsibility and republished documents to that effect.

== See also ==
- German–Soviet military parade in Brest-Litovsk
- Poland–Russia relations
- Soviet repressions of Polish citizens (1939–1946)
- World War II Behind Closed Doors: Stalin, the Nazis and the West

== Sources ==
- Michalek, Boleslaw. 1973. The Cinema of Andrzej Wajda. The Tanvity Press. A. S. Barnes and Company. New York. ISBN 0-498-01325-1
- Niemitz, Dorata; Steinberg, Stefan (2016-10-14). "Polish film and theatre director Andrzej Wajda dead at 90". World Socialist Web Site.
- Saubhik Ghosh. Katyn-Kolonko (The Katyn Crime). Bengali, EKDIN, Sunday Supplement Cover Story
- Steinberg, Stefan (2008-03-05). "Katyn—The political agenda of Polish filmmaker Andrzej Wajda". World Socialist Web Site.
