= Victor Meutelet =

French actor (born 1998)

- Born: 1997 or 1998 (age 27–28); Mainvilliers, Eure-et-Loir, France
- Occupation: Actor
- Years active: 2014–present

Victor Meutelet (born 1997 or 1998) is a French actor.

== Biography ==
Meutelet was born in Mainvilliers, Eure-et-Loir. He attended Lycée Jehan-de-Beauce in Chartres, where he received a baccalauréat in economics and social sciences. He studied at Paris Diderot University.

He began acting after his mother saw a casting advertisement and urged him to audition. Although he did not get the part, he continued to pursue acting. He made his film debut in Claude Lelouch's 2014 film, Salaud, on t'aime.

== Filmography ==
=== Film ===
Year	Title	Role	Ref.
2014	Salaud, on t'aime	Antoine	
2016	Tout Schuss	Nathan	
2016	Fanny's Journey	Elie	
2016	Eternity	Guillaume (18 years old)	
2016	Breathe	Antoine	
2018	MILF	Markus	
2021	Some Like It Rare	Lucas	
2022	Deep Fear	Henry	
2022	La Débandade	Félix	
2022	Les Rascals	Adam	
2022	Filip	Pierre	
2024	Lucky Winners	Thomas	
2024	Finalement	Young actor	
2024	Monsieur Aznavour	Johnny Hallyday	
2025	Fall for Me	Manu	
2025	Chopin, a Sonata in Paris	Franz Liszt	
TBA	L'Ordre Pourpre		

=== Television ===
Year	Title	Role	Notes	Ref.
2014	Josephine, Guardian Angel	Mathieu	1 episode	
2015	Un fils	Paul	Television film	
2015–2016	Clem	Lucas	8 episodes	
2016	Lebowitz contre Lebowitz	Mathieu Brousse	1 episode	
2017	Section de recherches	Julien Lacombe	1 episode	
2018	Eyewitness	Lucas Moreau	6 episodes	
2019	Alex Hugo	Kévin Tesson	1 episode	
2019	The Hook Up Plan	Arthur	5 episodes	
2019	Le Bazar de la Charité	Victor Minville	8 episodes	
2020	Murder in the Basque Country	Tom Payet	Television film	
2020	Grand Hôtel	Anthony Pereira	8 episodes	
2020	Something to Hide	Lucas	4 episodes	
2020–2024	Emily in Paris	Timothée	5 episodes	
2021	Voltaire in Love	Duke of Richelieu	4 episodes	
2021	L'ami qui n'existe pas	Jeff; Dan	Television film	
2023–2024	Master Crimes	Samuel Cythere	12 episodes	
2024	Le Jour de ma mort	Walter	Television film	
TBA	Montmartre	Arsène	TBA	
