= Afterimage (film) =

2016 film directed by Andrzej Wajda

- Film poster
- Directed by: Andrzej Wajda
- Written by: Andrzej Mularczyk
- Produced by: Michał Kwieciński
- Starring: Bogusław Linda
- Cinematography: Paweł Edelman
- Edited by: Grażyna Gradoń
- Music by: Andrzej Panufnik
- Production company: Akson Studio
- Distributed by: Akson Studio
- Release dates: 10 September 2016 (TIFF); 3 March 2017 (Poland)
- Running time: 98 minutes
- Country: Poland
- Language: Polish
- Box office: $1 032 768

Afterimage (Polish: Powidoki) is a 2016 Polish drama film directed by Andrzej Wajda. It was screened in the Masters section at the 2016 Toronto International Film Festival. It was selected as the Polish entry for the Best Foreign Language Film at the 89th Academy Awards but it was not nominated. It was the Opening film at Indian Film Festival. It is the final film by Wajda who died in October 2016.

== Cast ==
- Bogusław Linda – Władysław Strzemiński
- Bronislawa Zamachowska – Nika Strzemińska
- Zofia Wichłacz – Hania
- Andrzej Konopka – personalny
- Krzysztof Pieczyński – Julian Przyboś
- Szymon Bobrowski – Włodzimierz Sokorski
- Mariusz Bonaszewski – Madejski
- Anna Majcher – Strzemiński's neighbor
- Paulina Gałązka as Wasińska
- Aleksander Fabisiak – Rajner
- Magdalena Warzecha – museum worker
- Irena Melcer – Jadzia
- Tomasz Chodorowski – Tomek
- Filip Gurłacz – Konrad
- Mateusz Rusin – Stefan
- Mateusz Rzeźniczak – Mateusz
- Adrian Zaremba – Wojtek
- Tomasz Włosok – Roman

== Plot ==
The start of the film begins in 1948 with Strzemiński as an influential lecturer at the School of Visual Arts, Łódź. However he refuses to renounce abstract art despite the new Stalinist regime demanding only Socialist Realist art be taught. This results in him being stripped of his position at the school, and his works (including his famous "Neo-Plastic Room" at the Museum of Art, Łódź) were either withdrawn from public view or simply destroyed. Then the bureaucracy denied him his ability to make a living as a sign-painter, prevented him buying art supplies, and collecting food stamps.

== Reception ==
The film has an approval rating of 86% on review aggregator website Rotten Tomatoes, based on 43 reviews, and an average rating of 7/10. The website's critical consensus states, "Afterimage's punishing narrative pays dividends through Andrzej Wajda's still-formidable control and a message that, while certainly grim, is undeniably worthy". On Metacritic the film has a score of 75 of 100 based on 14 reviews, indicating "Generally favorable reviews".

== See also ==
- List of submissions to the 89th Academy Awards for Best Foreign Language Film
- List of Polish submissions for the Academy Award for Best Foreign Language Film
