= Robert Gonera =

Polish film, stage and television actor

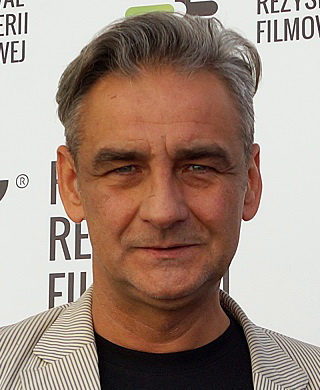
- Gonera in 2018
- Born: 1969 (age 56–57); Syców, Poland
- Education: AST, Wrocław faculty
- Occupations: Actor, director
- Years active: 1989–present
- Agent: Gudejko
- Spouse(s): 1. Jolanta Fraszyńska (divorced); 2. Karolina Wolska (divorced)

Robert Gonera (born 1969) is a Polish film, stage and television actor. He played leading roles in Krzysztof Krauze's political drama Street Games and the thriller The Debt, for which he received the Polish Academy Award for Best Actor. He became widely known after starring in a record audience television series L for Love aired on TVP2.

== Biography ==
=== Early life ===
He was born in Syców. He grew up in Twardogóra, where he regularly visited the cinema, which he reactivated with his brothers in 1994. He attended the Juliusz Słowacki High School in Olesnica, where he gained his first acting skills in the amateur theater and cabaret Salon Satyryczny Struś. He was the author of a play that won an honorable mention at a cabaret review at the Wrocław Youth House of Culture. He passed his high school diploma at the age of 18, as he went to school a year earlier. In 1991 he graduated from the Wrocław branch of the PWST in Kraków, where he later taught workshops.

=== Career ===
In 1990, he made his debut in the role of Motl Kamzoil in the classic musical Fiddler on the Roof by Jerry Bock, directed by Jan Szurmiej on the stage of Wroclaw Operetta, with which he was affiliated from 1991 to 1992. He performed in Wroclaw theaters: the Polish Theater (1992–1999), the Song Theater (2005) and the Helena Modrzejewska Theater in Legnica (2001–2004).

His participation in Krzysztof Krauze's comedy New York, Four o'clock in the Morning (1988) was limited to sitting on a bench at the railway station in Bystrzyca Klodzka. His first screen role was Jacek "Hephaestus" Zybig in Radoslaw Piwowarski's psychological drama Marcowe migdały (1989). He then played the character of Mariusz in Teresa Kotlarczyk's The Plant (1990). In Feliks Falk's drama Samowolka (1993), he played the role of Private Robert Kowalski. He appeared in the music video for the song of the band Myslovitz "The length of the sound of loneliness" (1999). For his portrayal of businessman Adam Borecki in Krzysztof Krauze's crime drama Dług (1999), he received the Polish Film Award Eagle. In the TV series M jak miłość (2000–2006), he starred as Jacek Milecki.

== Filmography ==
=== Film ===
- Marcowe migdały (1989)
- The Bet (1990)
- Samowolka (1993)
- Street Games (1996)
- The Debt (1999)
- The Spring to Come (2001)
- Filip (2023)

=== Television ===
- Tatort ep. Eiskalt (1997)
- L for Love (2000–2006)
- Determinator (2007)
- Days of Honor season 4 (2008)
- Polizeiruf 110 ep. 354 (2015)
- Belfer (2016–)
- Belle Epoque (2017)
- Korona Królów (2018–)
- Czarne stokrotki (2025)
