= In-law (disambiguation) =

In-law may refer to:

- Affinity (law), kinship by marriage, such as:
  - Parent-in-law, a mother-in-law or father-in-law
  - Sibling-in-law, a sister-in-law or brother-in-law
- In-law apartment, a type of secondary residence
- In-Laws, a 2002–2003 American situation comedy that aired on NBC
- The In-Laws (1979 film), an American action-comedy film starring Alan Arkin and Peter Falk
- The In-Laws (2003 film), an American comedy film starring Michael Douglas and Albert Brooks
- The In-Laws (2021 film), a Polish comedy film
  - The In-Laws 2, a 2023 Polish comedy film

== See also ==
- Kinship terminology
