= The In-Laws 2 =

2023 Polish film by Kalina Alabrudzińska

- Polish theatrical release poster
- Polish: Teściowie 2
- Directed by: Kalina Alabrudzińska
- Written by: Marek Modzelewski
- Produced by: Michał Kwieciński
- Starring: Maja Ostaszewska; Izabela Kuna; Adam Woronowicz; Eryk Kulm; Ewa Dałkowska; Andrzej Zieliński
- Cinematography: Nils Croné
- Edited by: Tymoteusz Wiskirski
- Music by: Marcin Macuk
- Production companies: Akson Studio; Next Film; TVN
- Distributed by: Next Film
- Release date: 15 September 2023
- Running time: 95 minutes
- Country: Poland
- Language: Polish

The In-Laws 2 (Polish: Teściowie 2) is a 2023 Polish comedy film directed by Kalina Alabrudzińska. It is a sequel to the 2021 film The In-Laws.

== Premise ==
Łukasz and Weronika give their relationship a second chance and invite their family to a wedding at the Polish seaside.

== Cast ==
- Maja Ostaszewska as Małgorzata Wilk, Łukasz's mother
- Izabela Kuna as Wanda Chrapek, Weronika's mother
- Adam Woronowicz as Tadeusz Chrapek, Weronika's father
- Eryk Kulm as Jan Sznajder, Małgorzata's boyfriend
- Ewa Dałkowska as Małgorzata's mother
- Andrzej Zieliński as Wojciech Zamecki
- Rafał Grotowski as Thomas
- Bohdan Graczyk as Hans
- Patryk Michalak as Gunter
- Bogumiła Trzeciakowska as Zuza, the receptionist
- Ignacy Martusewicz as Łukasz Wilk
- Katarzyna Chojnacka as Weronika Chrapek

== Production ==
Filming took place in Orłowo, a district of Gdynia.

== Release ==
The film had its premiere at the Helios cinema in Warsaw on 13 September 2023. It was released theatrically in Poland two days later, on 15 September.
