= Adam Woronowicz =

Polish actor (born 1973)

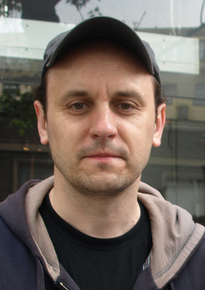
- Woronowicz in 2013
- Born: 25 December 1973 (age 52); Białystok, Poland
- Education: Aleksander Zelwerowicz National Academy of Dramatic Art in Warsaw
- Occupation: Actor
- Years active: 1995–present
- Spouse: Agnieszka Woronowicz
- Children: 4

Adam Woronowicz (Polish pronunciation: [vɔrɔ'nɔvʲit͡ʂ]; born 25 December 1973) is a Polish character actor. He has appeared in more than 90 films since 1995. He received seven Polish Academy Award for Best Supporting Actor nominations, winning once for the 2010 drama film, The Christening.

== Life and career ==
Woronowicz was born in Białystok and in 1997 graduated from the Aleksander Zelwerowicz National Academy of Dramatic Art in Warsaw. He performed in a various Warsaw theatres since 1990s. He plays on stage in TR Warszawa. His first notable film role was in the 2002 romantic period drama Chopin: Desire for Love. In 2009 he played Jerzy Popiełuszko in the drama film Popieluszko: Freedom is Within Us. The following years he played many supporting roles in films include Reverse (2009), The Christening (2010), Walesa: Man of Hope (2013), Body (2015), Demon (2015), Breaking the Limits (2017), Cold War (2018), All My Friends Are Dead (2020), and The In-Laws (2021).

On television, Woronowicz was a regular cast member in a number of series, such as Days of Honor (2012), Blood from the Blood (2015) and Pakt (2015–16). From 2017 to 2019 he starred alongside Maja Ostaszewska in the medical drama series, Diagnosis. From 2021 to 2023 he played Sylwester Hepner in the crime drama series The Convict opposite Agata Kulesza, and later in 2021 began starring in the sitcom The Office PL.

== Selected filmography ==
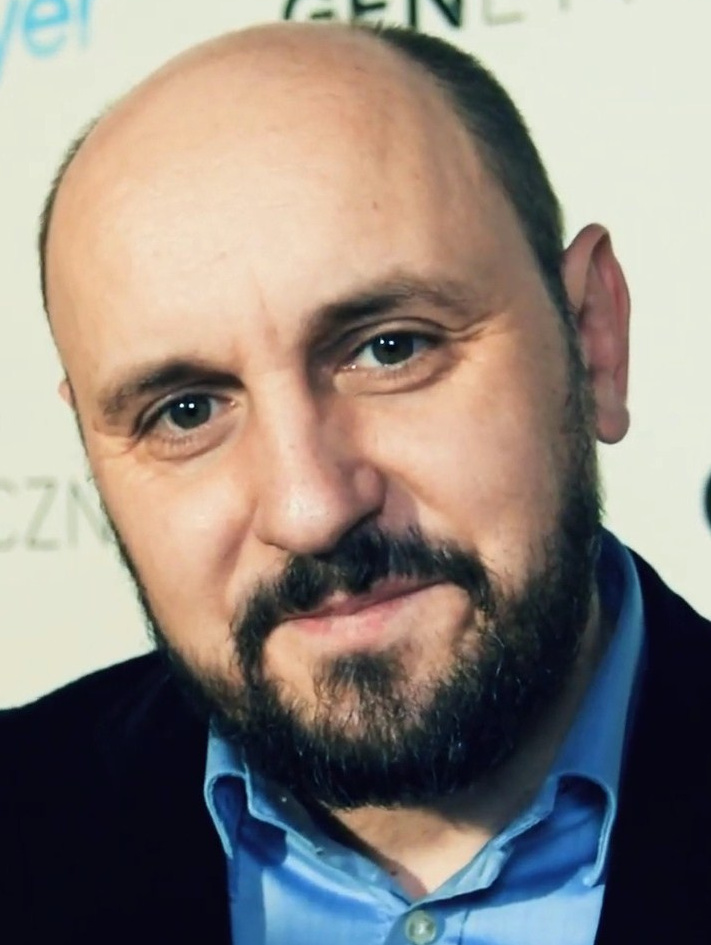
Woronowicz in 2020

- 1999: Skok as Kosa
- 2002: Chopin: Desire for Love as Maurice Dudevant
- 2009: Popieluszko: Freedom Is Within Us as Father Jerzy Popiełuszko
- 2009: Generał Nil as Igor Andrejew
- 2009: Reverse as Mr Józef
- 2010: The Christening as Gruby
- 2011: Man, Chicks Are Just Different as Adaś Miauczyński
- 2012: Czas honoru as Col. UB Leon Wasilewski
- 2013: Traffic Department as prosecutor Czech
- 2013: Walesa: Man of Hope
- 2014: The Mighty Angel
- 2014: All About My Parents
- 2015: The Red Spider as vet Lucjan Staniak
- 2015: Pakt as Dariusz Skalski, Minister of the Economy
- 2015: Demon
- 2017: Breaking the Limits
- 2018: Cold War as Consul
- 2020: All My Friends Are Dead as Inspector Kwaśniewski
- 2021: The In-Laws
- 2021: My Wonderful Life
- 2021–present: The Office PL
- 2021–2023: The Convict as Sylwester Hepner
- 2022: Below the Surface as bosun Henryk Kotecki
- 2023: The In-Laws 2
- 2024: Boxer
