= My Name Is Sara =

2019 American biographical drama film

My Name is Sara
- Directed by: Steven Oritt
- Written by: David Himmelstein
- Produced by: Steven Oritt; Justyna Pawlak
- Starring: Zuzanna Surowy; Eryk Lubos; Michalina Olszańska
- Cinematography: Marian Prokop
- Edited by: Agnieszka Glińska
- Music by: Łukasz Targosz
- Production companies: James Lucy Productions; Media Luna New Films; Watchout Studio
- Release date: 21 July 2019 (Giffoni Film Festival)
- Running time: 111 minutes
- Country: United States
- Languages: English; Polish; Russian; German

My Name is Sara (also known as The Occupation) is a 2019 American biographical drama film directed by Steven Oritt, starring Zuzanna Surowy, Eryk Lubos and Michalina Olszańska. It is based on the life of Holocaust survivor Sara Góralnik.

== Cast ==
- Zuzanna Surowy as Sara
- Eryk Lubos as Pavlo
- Michalina Olszańska as Nadya
- Ksawery Szlenkier as Avram
- Aleksandra Pisula as Tsivia
- Iwona Bielska as Vira Ivanenko
- Paweł Królikowski as Ivan
- Konrad Cichon as Moishe
- Piotr Nerlewski as Grisha
- Artur Sokolski as Danylo
- Marcin Sokolski as Stepan
- Magdalena Celówna-Janikowska as Pavlo's mother
- Stanislaw Cywka as Boris
- Izabela Dąbrowska as Marina
- Lech Dyblik as Fedir Ivanenko
- Radosław Kaim as German Soldier
- Wiesław Komasa as Father Oleksa
- Maciej Mikołajczyk as SS Officer
- Bartosz Porczyk as Captain
- Ryszard Ronczewski as Pavlo's Father

== Release ==
The film premiered at the Giffoni Film Festival on 21 July 2019.

== Reception ==
Matt Zoller Seitz of RogerEbert.com rated the film 3.5 stars out of 4 and called it a "torment in cinematic form, made engrossing by its focus on a singular experience, and the performance that anchors it", writing that Surowy "has that gift of letting the surroundings and events absorb and reflect her."

Gary Goldstein of the Los Angeles Times wrote that the film "has its share of physically and emotionally tough moments", and called Surowy's performance "gripping, deeply textured and sympathetic".

Ben Kenigsberg of The New York Times called the film "intermittently powerful if somewhat stiff-jointed" and wrote that it can be "clunkily expository" and "frustratingly vague."
