= Izabela Kuna =

Polish actress (born 1970)

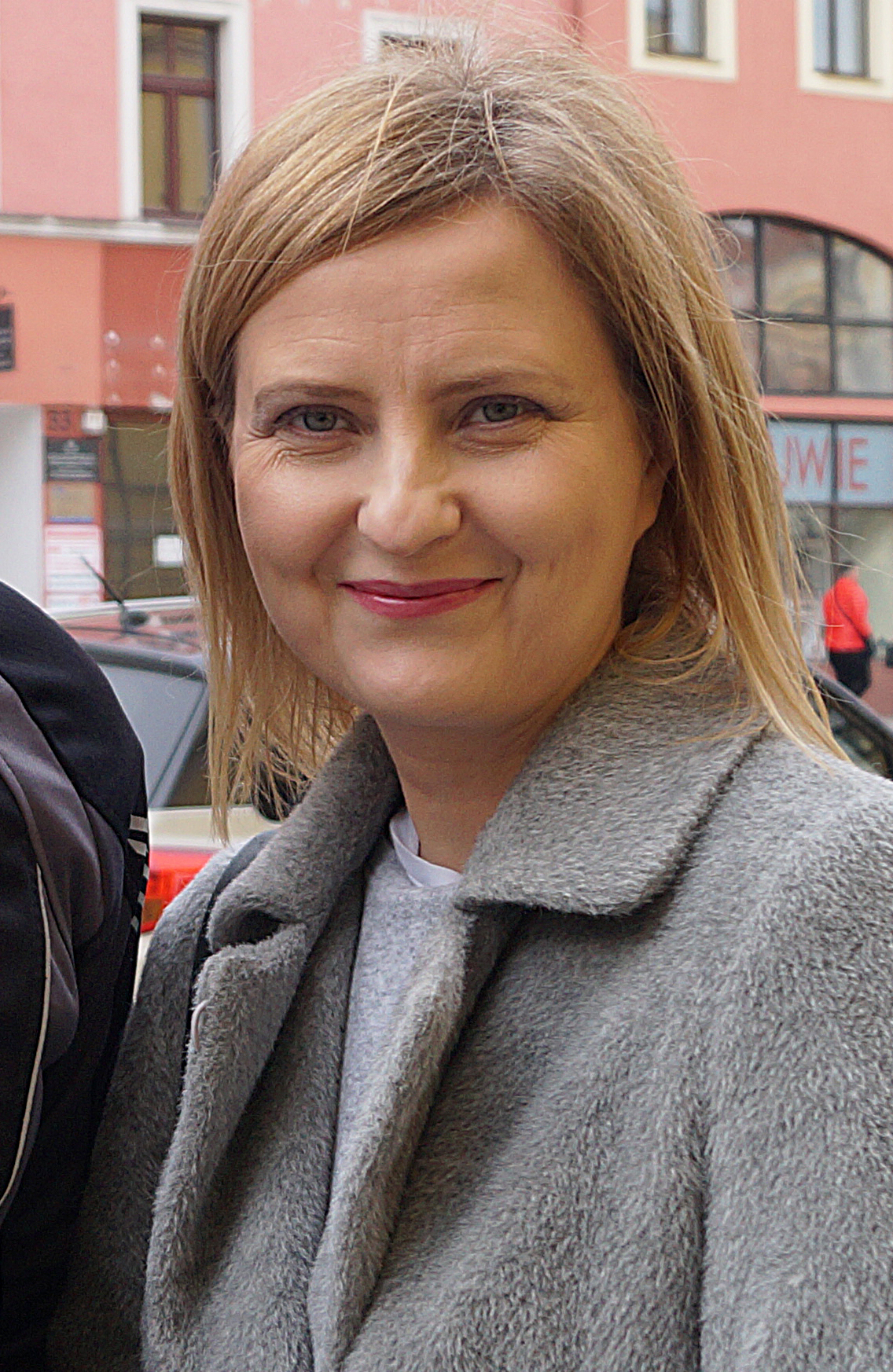
- Kuna in 2019
- Born: 25 November 1970 (age 55); Tomaszów Mazowiecki, Poland
- Education: Łódź Film School
- Occupation: Actress
- Years active: 1990–present

Izabela Kuna (born 25 November 1970) is a Polish film, television and theatre actress as well as a blogger.

== Life and career ==
She was born on 25 November 1970 in Tomaszów Mazowiecki. In 1989, she graduated from the Stefan Żeromski High School No. 2 in Tomaszów Mazowiecki. In 1993, she graduated from the National Film School in Łódź.

In 2004, she won the Grand Prix at the "Two Theatres" Festival in Sopot for her role in a play Łucja i jej dzieci (Lucy and Her Children). She gained popularity by appearing in TV soap operas such as Barwy szczęścia broadcast on TVP2 Channel. In 2013, she published her first book entitled Klara. She starred in numerous films including Krzysztof Krauze's 1999 film The Debt, Małgorzata Szumowska's 2008 film 33 Scenes from Life, Tomasz Wasilewski's 2013 LGBT-themed drama film Floating Skyscrapers, Wojciech Smarzowski's 2016 historical drama film Volhynia, Marie Noëlle's 2016 biopic Marie Curie: The Courage of Knowledge and Wojciech Smarzowski's 2018 drama film Clergy.

== Filmography ==
- 1995: Archiwista as Krystyna Wagner, Zbigniew's wife
- 1996: Ekstradycja 2 as an UOP secret agent (episode 2)
- 1996: Dom as a TV reporter (episode 16)
- 1997: Historie miłosne as a nun
- 1997–1999: Klan as Ewa Kowalik
- 1999: Na koniec świata as Wiktor's model
- 1999: The Debt as Matczak's wife
- 2002: Psie serce as Dorota
- 2003: M jak miłość as a nurse
- 2003: Kasia i Tomek (season 2) as Lena (episode 6)
- 2003: Daleko od noszy as Krystyna Nosoń (episode 4)
- 2003: Ciało as sister Felicyta
- 2003–2007: Na Wspólnej as Aneta Czarnecka
- 2004: Talki z resztą as Marta Boniatowska (episode 6)
- 2004: Plebania as Bożena Paprocka
- 2004: Na dobre i na złe as Beata Skowron (episode 200)
- 2004: Kryminalni Anny Szennert's neighbour (episode 8)
- 2005–2006: Tango z aniołem as Ewa Rynwid
- 2006: Jan Paweł II as Emilia Wojtyła, Karol's mother
- 2006: Magda M. as Edyta Garnicka (episode 31)
- 2006: Job, czyli ostatnia szara komórka as Chemik's mother
- 2007: Prawo miasta as Emilia Gralczyk, Edward's wife
- 2007: Jak to jest być moją matką as Monika Motyka
- 2007: Hindenburg: The Untold Story as Mathilda Doehner
- 2007: Ekipa as a director of children's hospice
- 2007: Cztery poziomo as Łańcuszek's wife
- 2007–2016: Barwy szczęścia as Maria Pyrka-Złota
- 2008: Lejdis as Gośka
- 2008: 33 sceny z życia as Kaśka
- 2009: Złoty środek as Ula
- 2009: Miłość na wybiegu as Ilona
- 2009: Idealny facet dla mojej dziewczyny as Klara Rojek
- 2009: Galerianki as Alicja's mother
- 2010: Śniadanie do łóżka as Ewa
- 2010–2011: Szpilki na Giewoncie as Eliza Morawska
- 2010: Lincz as Jagoda Słota
- 2010: Joanna as Ewa
- 2011: Popatrz na mnie as Agnieszka
- 2011: Pokaż, kotku, co masz w środku as Alicja
- 2011: Komisarz Alex Ewa Malczewska (episode 3)
- 2012: Supermarket as Bogusia Warecka
- 2012, 2014–2015: Krew z krwi as Sandra Kozłowska
- 2012–2013: Piąty Stadion as Joanna
- 2013: Wspomnienie poprzedniego lata as Krystyna
- 2013: Run Boy Run as Kowalska
- 2013: Floating Skyscrapers as Krystyna, Michał's mother
- 2013: Ojciec Mateusz as Hanna Waga, Jacek's wife (episode 113)
- 2013: Drogówka as Ewa
- 2014: Warsaw by Night as Iga
- 2014: The Mighty Angel as Katarzyna
- 2014: Kochanie, chyba cię zabiłem as Janina Pokojska
- 2014: Baron24 as Sylwia Baron
- 2015: Web Therapy as Roma Dudek (episode 4)
- 2015: Na dobre i na złe as Danka (episode 600)
- 2015: Singielka as Dorota Łapacka
- 2016: Volhynia as Głowacka, Zosia's mother
- 2016: Szatan kazał tańczyć as Monika
- 2016: Marie Curie: The Courage of Knowledge as Bronisława Skłodowska, Maria's sister
- 2017: Spitsbergen as Julka's mother
- 2017: PolandJa as Jola
- 2017: Miasto skarbów as "Mother", ABW Director
- 2017: Listy do M. 3 as Agata
- 2017: Komisarz Alex as Wiktoria Książek (episode 113)
- 2017: Dom pełen zmian as Magda Malinowska
- 2017: Amok as Lidia
- 2017: Ach śpij kochanie as Jadwiga Suchowa
- 2018: Za marzenia as Bartek's mother
- 2018: Trzecia połowa as Joanna Konopka (episode 8)
- 2018: Pitbull. Ostatni pies as Regina
- 2018: Drogi wolności as Janina Biernacka, Ignacy's sister
- 2018: Clergy as an ethics teacher
- 2021: The In-Laws
- 2023: Forgotten Love as Countess Czyńska
- 2023: The In-Laws 2
- 2025: The In-Laws 3
