= Kasper Bajon =

Polish film director and writer (born 1983)

- Born: 9 January 1983 (age 43)
- Occupations: Film director, screenwriter, writer

Kasper Bajon (born 9 January 1983) is a film director, Polish screenwriter and writer.

== Biography ==
He is the son of Katarzyna Gintowt and Filip Bajon.

== Filmography ==
- Lokatorki (2015), writer
- Via Carpatia (2018), writer, director
- The Mire (2018–2024), writer
- Open Your Eyes (2021), writer
- High Water (2022), writer
- Heweliusz (2025), writer
- Project UFO (2025), writer, director
- The Idiots (2026), writer
- Prawo bestii (2026), writer, director

Source.

== Books ==
- Pomarańczowy pokój. Warszawa: Wydawnictwo Nowy Świat. 2005.
- Miłość do poranków. Warszawa: Wydawnictwo Nowy Świat. 2008.
- Koń Alechina. Warszawa: Wydawnictwo MG. 2010.
- Klug. Warszawa: Wielka Litera. 2012.
- Blizno. Warszawa: Wydawnictwo Nisza. 2017.
- Wymiana. Warszawa: Wydawnictwo Nisza. 2017.
- Fuerte. Wołowiec: Wydawnictwo Czarne. 2020.
- Ideot. Warszawa: Wydawnictwo Nisza. 2021.
- Gambit orangutana: opowieść o polskich szachach. Wołowiec: Wydawnictwo Czarne. 2022.
- Poznań kolonialny: rodzinna historia z Tanzanią w tle. Wołowiec: Wydawnictwo Czarne. 2025.

== Awards ==
He was a finalist of the 2021 Nike Award for his book Fuerte. He earned 2026 Nike Award nomination for his book Poznań kolonialny: rodzinna historia z Tanzanią w tle.
