= Karolina Gorczyca =

Polish actress (born 1985)

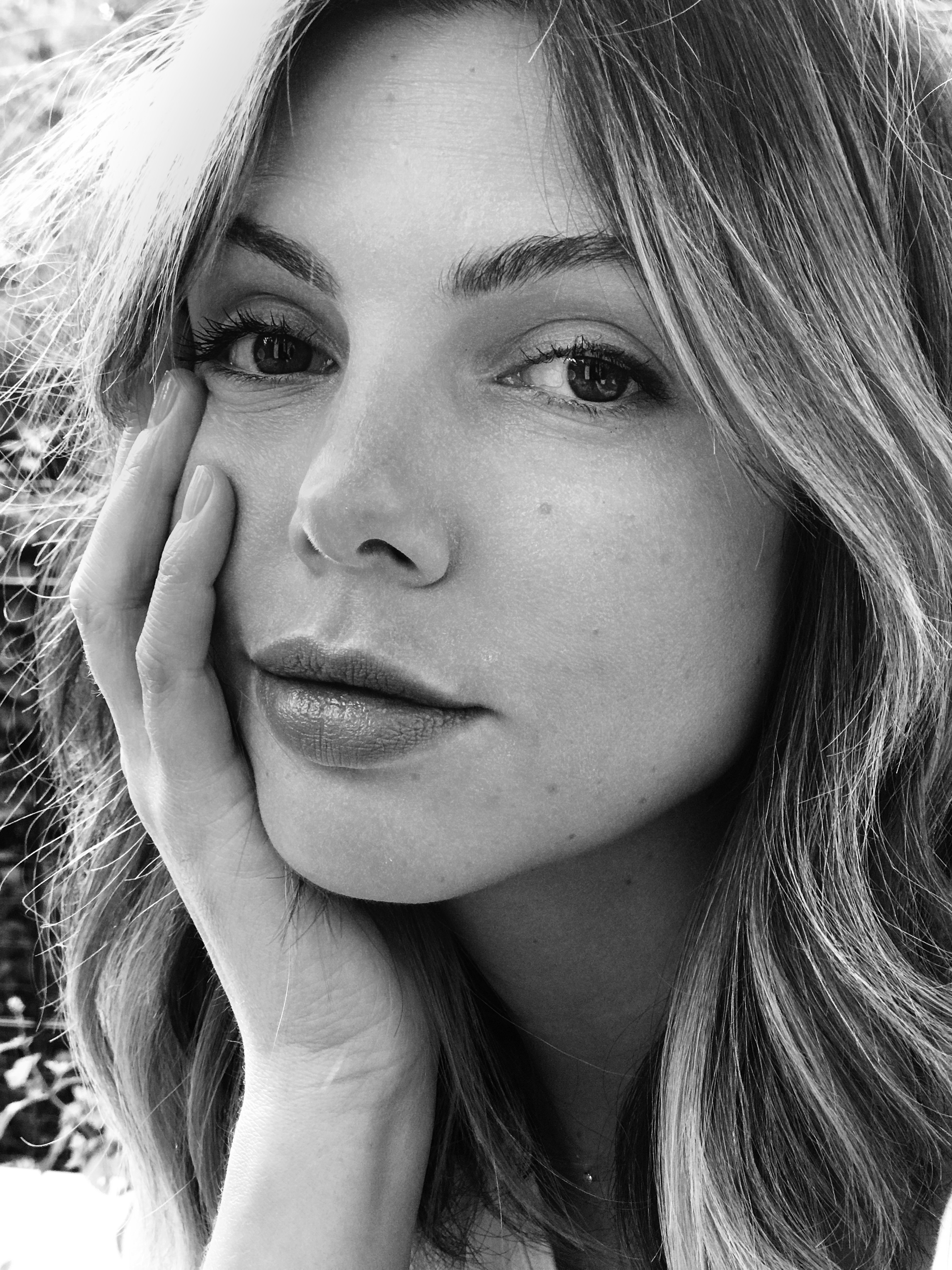
- Gorczyca in 2019
- Born: 14 March 1985 (age 40); Biłgoraj, Poland
- Education: AST National Academy of Theatre Arts
- Occupation: Actress
- Years active: 2006–present
- Spouse: Krzysztof Czeczot (m. 2024)
- Children: 2

Karolina Gorczyca (Polish pronunciation: [ka.rɔˈli.na ɡɔrˈt͡ʂɘ.t͡sa]; born 14 March 1985) is a Polish actress.

== Biography ==
Gorczyca was born and raised in Biłgoraj. Her father was a truck driver and her mother was a sales clerk. She was raised Catholic. She graduated from the AST National Academy of Theatre Arts in 2008. In late 2016, she competed on season 19 of Dancing with the Stars: Taniec z gwiazdami.

She has a daughter, Maria, who was born in 2011. Her son was born in 2018. She married actor Krzysztof Czeczot in September 2024.

== Filmography ==
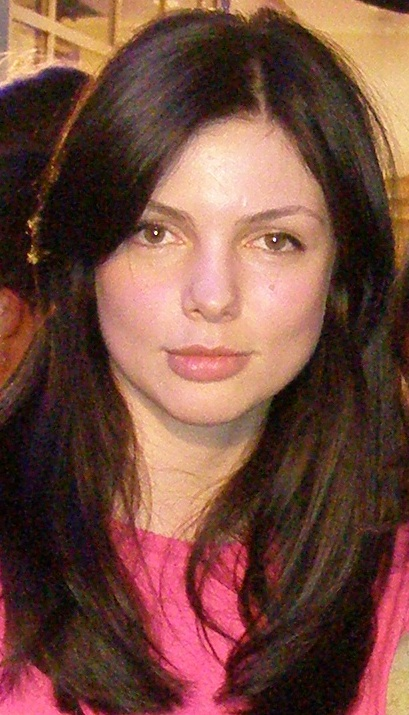
Gorczyca in 2011

=== Film ===
Year	Title	Role	Ref.
2007	Twists of Fate	Kasia Darska	
2008	Time of Darkness	Joanna Kurczewska	
2009	Miłość na wybiegu	Julia Wejcher	
2009	Ostatnia akcja	Magda	
2010	Huśtawka	Karolina	
2010	Flying Pigs	Alina	
2012	Komisarz Blond i Oko sprawiedliwości	Assistant	
2012	Zdjęcie	Ewa	
2014	Wybraniec	Justyna Mróz	
2014	Agnieszka	Agnieszka Radomska	
2023	Pokolenie Ikea	Gośka	

=== Television ===
Year	Title	Role	Notes	Ref.
2008	Twarzą w twarz	Dr. Dorota Popławska	13 episodes	
2009–2010	Na dobre i na złe	Dr. Iwona Kalicka	22 episodes	
2009–2014	Days of Honor	Wiktoria "Ruda" Rudnicka	52 episodes	
2010	Sprawiedliwi	Jakub's nurse	1 episode	
2010–2011	Usta usta	Lena Adler	14 episodes	
2012	Hotel 52	Sister Anna Makowska	1 episode	
2012	Anna German	Jadwiga Kowalska	Recurring role	
2013	Komisarz Alex	Ewa Wilk	3 episodes	
2013	Medics	Karolina	1 episode	
2013–2014	To nie koniec świata	Anka Szostakowska	26 episodes	
2013–2023	Father Matthew	Inka Adamus; Magda Czuma	2 episodes	
2015–2016	Singielka	Sylwia Flis	67 episodes	
2016	Bodo	Alina Roland	2 episodes	
2018	Druga szansa	Kornelia	5 episodes	
2019	Ultraviolet	Ilona Serafin	4 episodes	
2020	Mały zgon	Angela	7 episodes	
2021–2022	Angel of Death	Ewelina Wrońska	12 episodes	
2022	Der Usedom-Krimi	Dana Driest	1 episode	
2023	Sortownia	Fuel manager	3 episodes	
2023	Rafi	Marta Jaracz	1 episode	

=== Video games ===
Year	Title	Role	Notes	Ref.
2013	Tomb Raider	Lara Croft	Polish version	
2015	Rise of the Tomb Raider	Lara Croft	Polish version	
2020	Shadow of the Tomb Raider	Lara Croft	Polish version	
