= Zbigniew Cybulski Award =

Polish film award

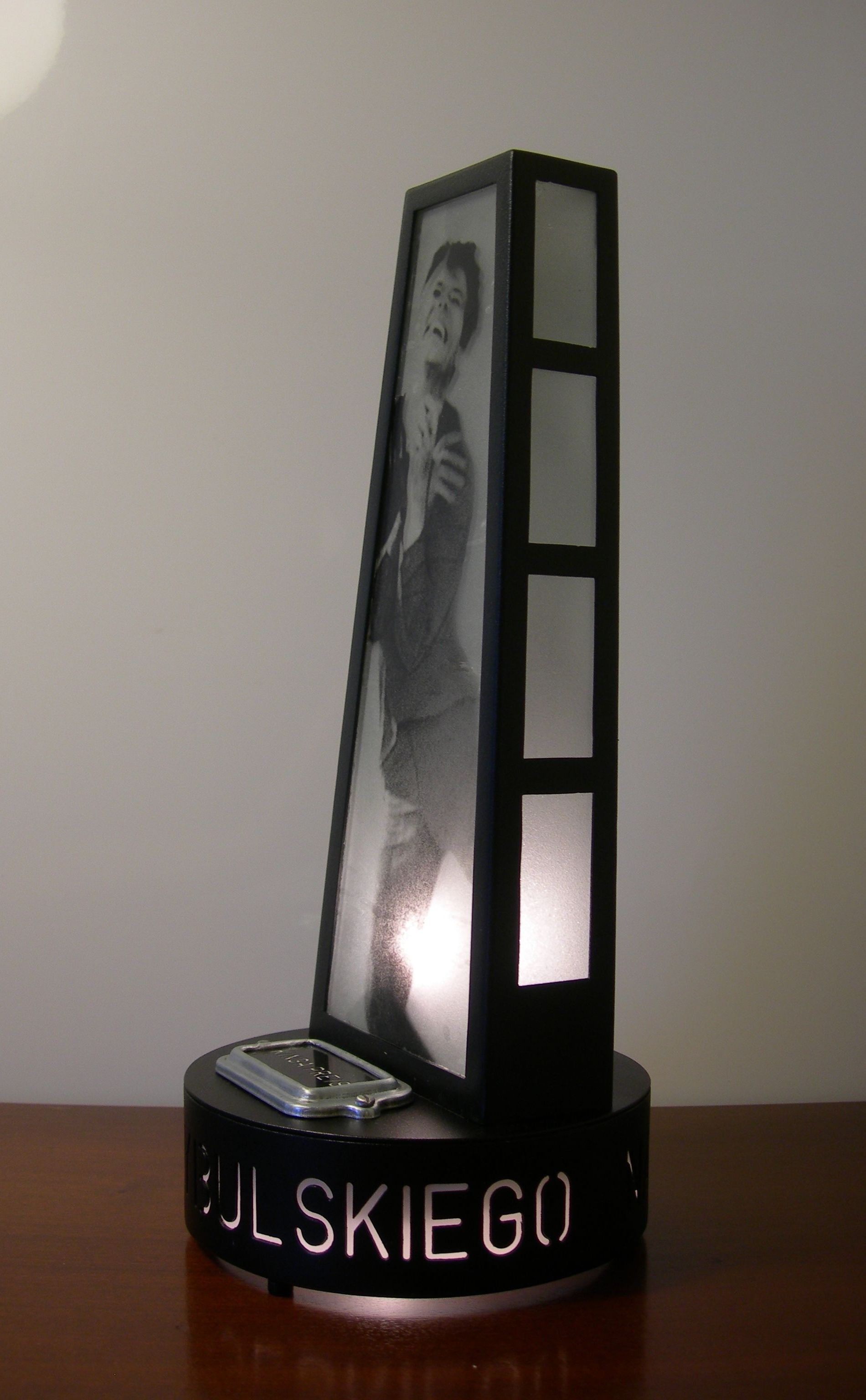
- Awarded for: Best young Polish actors
- Country: Poland
- Presented by: Kino Foundation
- First award: 1969
- Website: www.nagrodacybulskiego.pl

The Zbigniew Cybulski Award (Polish: Nagroda im. Zbyszka Cybulskiego) is a Polish annual film award given to best young Polish actors. It was established in 1969 on the initiative of Wiesława Czapińska and named to commemorate Zbigniew Cybulski who is widely considered one of the greatest Polish actors of the second half of the 20th century. It is among the most prominent awards in Polish cinema and the past winners include some of the most popular and critically acclaimed Polish actors. It was continuously awarded by the film magazine Ekran from 1969 to 1995 and after a ten-year hiatus it was reactivated in 2005 by the Kino Foundation. In 2008, the foundation published a book Być jak Cybulski?, which is devoted to all the past recipients of the award.

== List of winners ==
- 1969 – Daniel Olbrychski
- 1970 – Marian Opania
- 1971 – Olgierd Łukaszewicz
- 1972 – Maja Komorowska
- 1973 – Jadwiga Jankowska-Cieślak
- 1974 – Franciszek Trzeciak
- 1975 – Maciej Góraj
- 1976 – Małgorzata Potocka
- 1977 – Gabriela Kownacka
- 1978 – Krystyna Janda
- 1979 – Marek Kondrat
- 1980 – Krzysztof Majchrzak
- 1981 – Dorota Stalińska
- 1982 – no award (Martial law in Poland)
- 1983 – Laura Łącz, Piotr Bajor
- 1984 – Hanna Mikuć, Michał Juszczakiewicz
- 1985 – Marek Wysocki
- 1986 – Małgorzata Pieczyńska, Jan Jankowski
- 1987 – Maria Pakulnis, Edward Żentara
- 1988 – Maria Gładkowska, Piotr Siwkiewicz
- 1989 – Adrianna Biedrzyńska
- 1990 – Zbigniew Zamachowski
- 1992 – Anna Majcher, Artur Żmijewski
- 1993 – Katarzyna Skrzynecka, Rafał Królikowski
- 1994 – Maria Seweryn, Rafał Olbrychski
- 1995 – Dorota Segda, Marek Bukowski
- 2005 – Marcin Dorociński; Kino Magazine Award: Maja Ostaszewska; Audience Award: Borys Szyc
- 2006 – Kinga Preis; Audience Award: Tomasz Kot
- 2007 – Sonia Bohosiewicz; Audience Award: Marcin Brzozowski
- 2008 – Maciej Stuhr
- 2009 – Eryk Lubos; Audience Award: Agata Buzek; Special Award: Bogusław Linda, Joanna Szczepkowska
- 2010 – Mateusz Kościukiewicz; Audience Award: Wojciech Zieliński
- 2011 – Magdalena Popławska; Audience Award: Jakub Gierszał
- 2012 – Marcin Kowalczyk
- 2013 – Piotr Głowacki; Special Award: Agnieszka Grochowska
- 2014/2015 – Agnieszka Żulewska
- 2016 – Marta Nieradkiewicz
- 2017 – Dawid Ogrodnik; Special Award: Julia Kijowska
- 2019 – Bartosz Bielenia; Special Award: Katarzyna Figura, Andrzej Chyra
- 2020/2021 – Magdalena Koleśnik
- 2022 – Eryk Kulm
- 2023 – Tomasz Włosok
- 2024 – Julian Świeżewski

== See also ==
- Polish cinema
- Gdynia Film Festival
- Warsaw Film Festival
