= The In-Laws (2021 film) =

2021 Polish film by Jakub Michalczuk

- Polish theatrical release poster
- Polish: Teściowie
- Directed by: Jakub Michalczuk
- Written by: Marek Modzelewski
- Based on: Wstyd by Marek Modzelewski
- Produced by: Michał Kwieciński
- Starring: Marcin Dorociński; Maja Ostaszewska; Izabela Kuna; Adam Woronowicz; Ewa Dałkowska; Monika Pikuła
- Cinematography: Michał Englert
- Edited by: Wojciech Włodarski
- Music by: Jerzy Rogiewicz
- Production companies: Akson Studio; Next Film
- Distributed by: Next Film
- Release date: 10 September 2021
- Running time: 82 minutes
- Country: Poland
- Language: Polish

The In-Laws (Polish: Teściowie) is a 2021 Polish comedy film directed by Jakub Michalczuk in his feature film directorial debut. In 2023, it was followed by a sequel, The In-Laws 2.

== Premise ==
Łukasz and Weronika's wedding is called off at the last minute. Their parents decide to proceed with the wedding reception anyway.

== Cast ==
- Marcin Dorociński as Andrzej Wilk, Łukasz's father
- Maja Ostaszewska as Małgorzata Wilk, Łukasz's mother
- Izabela Kuna as Wanda Chrapek, Weronika's mother
- Adam Woronowicz as Tadeusz Chrapek, Weronika's father
- Ewa Dałkowska as Małgorzata's mother
- Monika Pikuła as Alusia Wilk
- Ignacy Martusewicz as Łukasz Wilk, the groom
- Katarzyna Chojnacka as Weronika Chrapek, the bride

== Production ==
Filming took place at the Polonia Palace Hotel in Warsaw.
