= Boxer (2024 film) =

2024 film by Mitja Okorn

- Polish Netflix poster
- Polish: Bokser
- Directed by: Mitja Okorn
- Written by: Ivan Bezmarevic; Mitja Okorn; Lucas Coleman
- Produced by: Maciej Kawulski; Tomasz Wardyn
- Starring: Eryk Kulm; Adrianna Chlebicka; Eryk Lubos; Adam Woronowicz; Magdalena Walach; Michał Żurawski; Waleria Gorobets
- Cinematography: Bartek Cierlica
- Edited by: Jan Belcl
- Music by: Łukasz Targosz
- Production company: Open Mind Production
- Distributed by: Netflix
- Release date: 11 September 2024
- Running time: 150 minutes
- Country: Poland
- Language: Polish

Boxer (Polish: Bokser) is a 2024 Polish sports drama film co-written and directed by Mitja Okorn. It was released on Netflix on 11 September 2024.

== Cast ==
- Eryk Kulm as Jędrzej
- Adrianna Chlebicka as Kasia
- Eryk Lubos as Czesiek
- Adam Woronowicz as Nicky Presley
- Waleria Gorobets as Ewa
- Bartłomiej Kotschedoff as Wladek
- Jacek Poniedziałek as Henryk
- Michał Pietrzak as Konstanty
- Magdalena Walach as Jędrzej's mother
- Michał Żurawski as Edwin
- Andrzej Andrzejewski as Karol
- Mariusz Jakus as Jerzy Keller
- Kwok One as Y.S. Wong
- Harry Matthews as Roy Barber
- Jon McKenna as Neil McKavanagh
- Pierre Azéma as Pierre
- Henry Fadipe as Rascal O'Brien
- Anna Fam as Uyen Nguyen Wong
- Will Huse as Jackie Boss
- Hugo Nicholas as Coach Chris
- Alan Andersz as Bartosz
- Kamil Szklany as Krzysztof
- Magdalena Perlińska as Gabi

== Production ==
For his role as Jędrzej, Eryk Kulm underwent six months of boxing training. Filming took place in Bytom in late 2023.

== Release ==
The film was released on Netflix on 11 September 2024.

== Reception ==
John Serba of Decider called the film "predictable" and wrote, "The framing device feels stapled on, like an afterthought, as if to give the story a little heft before it floats away on a raft of cliches. Tonally, it's just as unfocused, wavering from the amiable, upbeat goofiness of a light comedy to overemotive strings-of-snot-and-drool melodrama."
