= Eryk Lubos =

Polish actor (born 1974)

- Eryk Lubos, 2015
- Born: 6 September 1974 (age 52)
- Citizenship: Polish
- Occupation: Actor

Eryk Lubos (born 6 September 1974) is an actor.

== Filmography ==
Source.

- Retrieval (2006) as judge
- Wednesday, Thursday Morning (2007) as “Rumun”
- Janosik: A True Story (2009) as Gabor
- The Dark House (2009) as Petrycki
- Trick (2010) as Kosa
- Flying Pigs (2010) as “Moher”
- Rose (2011) as Wasyl
- The Girl from the Wardrobe (2013) as Krzysztof
- Traffic Department (2013) as Marek Banaś
- Days of Honor (TV series) as Lebiediew
- Secret Wars (2014) as Rafun
- My Name Is Sara (2019) as Pavlo
- Letters to Santa 4 (2021) as Zbyszek
- Kayko and Kokosh (2021) as Rodrus, smug warrior (voice)
- How I Fell in Love with a Gangster (2022) as “Kleks”
- Erynie (2022) as Zygmunt Hanas vel Colonel Placyd Brzozowski (TV series)
- Wariaci (2023) as Eryk Kozłowski
- Boxer (2024) as Czesiek
- Diabeł (2024) as Max Achtelik
- Las (2025) as Dziad (Duffer) Eryk
- Kochanie, mamy problem! (2026)

== Awards ==
Source.

- Zbigniew Cybulski Award for the role in Moja krew (2009)
- Best Actor Award at the Karlovy Vary International Film Festival for the role in Zabić bobra (2012)
- Nomination for the Polish Academy Award for Best Supporting Actor for the role in The Girl from the Wardrobe (2014)
- Best Actor Award in the Polish Film Competition at the Off Camera Festival for the role in Tata (2023)
