= Filip (film) =

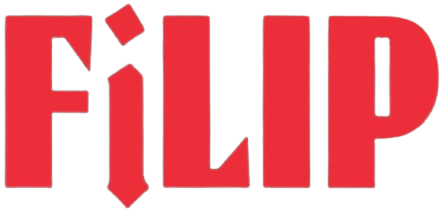
- Directed by: Michał Kwieciński
- Written by: Michał Kwieciński; Michał Matejkiewicz
- Produced by: Krystyna Świeca; Patryk Peridis; Michał Kwieciński
- Starring: Eryk Kulm Jr.; Victor Meutelet; Caroline Hartig; Zoë Straub
- Cinematography: Michał Sobociński
- Edited by: Nikodem Chabior
- Music by: Robert Koch
- Production companies: Telewizja Polska; Akson Studio
- Distributed by: TVP Dystrybucja Kinowa
- Release date: 28 February 2023 (Poland)
- Country: Poland
- Languages: German; Polish; French; Yiddish
- Box office: $ 1 188 838

Filip is a 2023 Polish war drama film, directed by Michał Kwieciński. It is based on the semi-biographical novel of the same name by Leopold Tyrmand (Filip, 1961).

== Plot ==
In 1941, Filip, a young Polish Jew, escapes the massacre of the Warsaw Ghetto, in which his fiance, Sara, is killed. Disguised as a French Gentile, Filip makes his way to Germany with the help of a smuggler, Staszek, who gives him false identity papers. In 1943, Filip works as a waiter in an upscale hotel restaurant in Frankfurt along with other European slave laborers and lives with his French colleague, Pierre, in a dormitory. The two engage in sexual relationships with German women at the risk of getting caught and executed, and manage to get away by blackmailing the women with threatening to expose them for infidelity and punishment for having sex with untermenschen.

One day, the management announces that the hotel would host a wedding managed by a senior Wehrmacht officer, Gukst, prompting greater scrutiny of the kitchen by Gukst's deputies led by Baumuller. During preparations for the event, an Italian waiter, Francesco, is hanged in front of the staff after the Gestapo discovers that has had sexual relations with German women, while Filip is beaten but ultimately released by Baumuller after his sexual relations with another woman, Blanka, are revealed. Despite this, Filip continues in his sexual escapades until he meets a photo-technician named Lisa, whose sincerity, non-enthusiasm for Nazism and acceptance of Filip's Jewish identity sets her apart from his previous flings. Filip falls in love and after an Allied bombing raid, the couple resolve to leave Frankfurt and start over before having sex. Filip learns that Staszek had committed suicide by gunshot and retrieves another set of false papers from his office to facilitate his departure.

Marlena, an old acquaintance from Warsaw, arrives at the hotel with her boyfriend, a Wehrmacht officer named Thomas, and blackmails Filip to give her a room in the same floor as Gukst for undisclosed reasons. Later, Blanka, whose affairs had been exposed and had her head shaved, seeks refuge at Filip and Pierre's dormitory. Filip gives Blanka one of two wine bottles stashed in the staff locker. The next day, Baumuller is alerted to the theft and inspects the locker. Finding the other bottle in Pierre's cubicle, which had been left there by an unwitting Filip, Baumuller orders Pierre to gulp down the bottle before shooting him dead in front of the staff. A distraught Filip reveals himself to be a Jew and asks to be shot, but Baumuller dismisses him as hysterical and spares him.

Filip goes to Lisa's house and breaks up with her. He then returns to the hotel, where the wedding is underway, and finds Marlena and Thomas revealing themselves to be members of the Polish resistance as they leave in a hurry and complement Filip for helping them in their mission. Filip then stumbles upon Gukst, who has been shot dead in his room. Filip takes Gukst's pistol and goes to a balcony above the wedding reception area. He then opens fire and kills Baumuller and several guests before escaping the hotel during the confusion to a train station, where he boards a train to Paris.

== Cast ==
- Eryk Kulm Jr. as Filip
- Victor Meutelet as Pierre
- Caroline Hartig as Lisa
- Zoë Straub as Blanka
- Sandra Drzymalska as Marlena
- Maja Szopa as Sara
- Gabriel Raab as Baumuller
- Bohdan Graczyk as Eissler
- Werner Biermeier as Brutsch
- Ondrej Kraus as Bohumil
- Joseph Altamura as Francesco
- Tom van Kessel as Lucas
- Mateusz Rzeźniczak as Laszlo
- Karol Biskup as Artur
- Nicolas Przygoda as Ilie
- Philip Günsch as Jupp
- Robert Więckiewicz as Staszek
- Julian Świeżewski as Kazik
- Jürg Plüss as Gukst
- Nicolo Pasetti as Karl
- Christine Detmers as Elsa
- Anke Sabrina Beerman as Greta
- Zofia Cybul as Annemarie
- Ada Szczepaniak as Marta
- Hanna Śleszyńska as Diva
- Edyta Torhan as Filip's mother
- Robert Gonera as Filip's father

== Reception ==
The film was first shown at the Polish Film Festival in September 2022, where it won the Silver Lion, and also awards to Michał Sobociński for cinematography and to Dariusz Krysiak for characterization. The actor playing the lead role, Erik Kulm Jr. received the Zbyszek Cybulski Award for a young actor of outstanding individuality in December 2022. The film was also presented at the Santa Barbara International Film Festival in 2023, which was its international premiere. Filip also received the highest award (Platinum Gorget) on March 1, 2023 during the III Festival of National Culture "Pamięć i Tożsamość" in Warsaw.

In his review, Jakub Majmurek appreciates the skill of the filmmakers in telling a full-blooded story in a modern style, as well as focusing, which is rare in Polish historical cinema, on the personal experience of a particular character rather than a grand narrative. Majmurek emphasizes the biopolitical nature of the story. The Nazi authorities in the film are mainly interested in the sexual morality of German women, while Philip is "a Jew who, in the midst of the Holocaust, refuses to die" and decides to enjoy life. Of the film's drawbacks, he mentions that at times it reverberates with misogynistic tones, and that it "lacks the closure that would have made a truly weighty and important work out of a good film offering a fresh look at a historical subject with an outstanding title role by Erik Kulm."
