= Eryk Kulm =

Polish actor (born 1990)

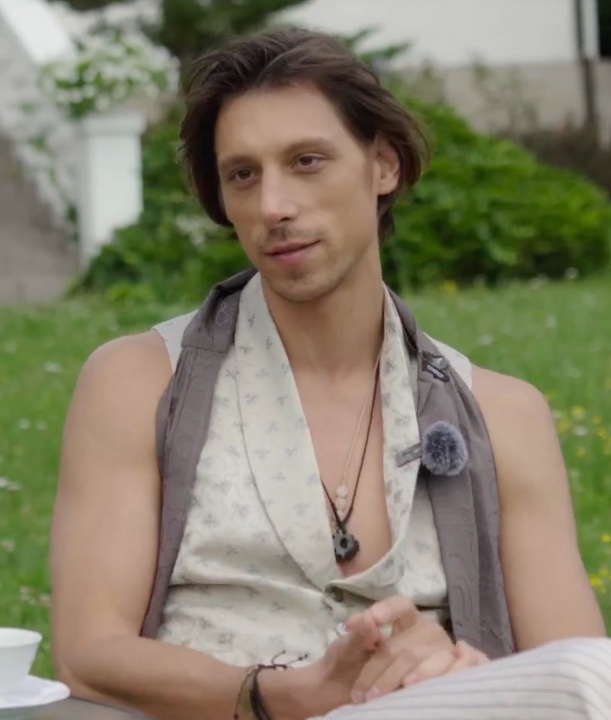
- Kulm in 2025
- Born: 19 October 1990 (age 35); Warsaw, Poland
- Other names: Eryk Kulm Jr.
- Education: National Academy of Dramatic Art
- Occupation: Actor
- Years active: 2004–present

Eryk Kulm (born 19 October 1990) is a Polish actor. For his titular role in the 2022 film Filip, he won the Polish Academy Award for Best Actor.

== Biography ==
Kulm was born in Warsaw. His father, Eryk, was a jazz musician and his mother was a painter. His father died in 2019 and his mother died in 2020.

He graduated from the National Academy of Dramatic Art in 2016.

== Filmography ==
=== Film ===
Year	Title	Role	Ref.
2004	The Welts		
2010	Mała matura 1947	Bogdan Rosenfeld	
2014	Stones for the Rampart	Jan "Anoda" Rodowicz	
2017	Bodo	Karol Hanusz	
2019	Bird Talk	Józef	
2019	Piłsudski	Hotel's Boy	
2020	Overclockers	Dionizy	
2021	Lokal zamknięty	Bartosz "Bart" Skompy	
2021	Śmierć Zygielbojma	Abraham Blum	
2022	Kazdy wie lepiej	Patient	
2022	Filip	Filip	
2023	Irena's Vow	Abram Klinger	
2023	The In-Laws 2	Jan Sznajder	
2024	Boxer	Jędrzej	
2025	Chopin, a Sonata in Paris	Frédéric Chopin	

=== Television ===
Year	Title	Role	Notes	Ref.
2008	Teraz albo nigdy!	Stripling	1 episode	
2010–2015	Barwy szczęścia	Kuba	76 episodes	
2012	True Law	Tomek	1 episode	
2013–2020	O mnie się nie martw	Patryk Walicki	8 episodes	
2015–2020	Father Matthew	Various	3 episodes	
2016	Bodo	Karol Hanusz	11 episodes	
2016–2017	L for Love	Filip	3 episodes	
2016–2017	Druga szansa	Courier	2 episodes	
2017	Belle Epoque	Kazanecki	10 episodes	
2018–2019	War Girls	Clarinetist Tadeusz	16 episodes	
2019	Mały Grand Hotel	Groom	1 episode	
2020	Radio, kamera, akcja!	Filmmaker	7 episodes	
2021	Cudak	Bellwether	Television film	
2021–2022	Kuchnia	Igor Jurczenko	39 episodes	
2022	Hold Tight	Officer Jacek	2 episodes	
2022–2023	Krucjata	Maks	8 episodes	
2023	Lipowo. Zmowa milczenia	Marek Zietar	8 episodes	
2024	Kiedy ślub?	Antoni "Tosiek" Świętojański	8 episodes	
2024	Klara	Kot	8 episodes	
2024	The Thaw	Paweł Lański	4 episodes	

== Awards and nominations ==
Award	Year	Category	Nominated work	Result	Ref.
Polish Film Awards	2024	Best Actor	Filip	Won	
Polish Film Awards	2026	Best Actor	Chopin, a Sonata in Paris	Nominated	
