= Anna Kazejak-Dawid =

Polish director and screenwriter (born 1979)

Anna Kazejak-Dawid (Anna Kazejak, born 15 January 1979 in Bytom) is a Polish director and screenwriter. Renowned especially for directing and writing the segment Silesia, part of the drama Oda do radości (Ode to joy, 2005), which won the Golden Lion at the 2010 Venice Film Festival. In her films she focuses on different aspects of being a woman, though she claims often her characters are based on men in her life.

== Education ==
Kazejak-Dawid studied cultural studies at both National Film School in Łódź and University of Silesia in Katowice. In 2001 she enrolled at National Film School in Łódź to study directing. She graduated in 2008.

== Career ==
Despite her young age, Kazejak-Dawid was met with critical acclaim, which is visible both in the positive press she received and in the nine nominations and six awards. Her newest film, Obietnica (2013), was shown at Berlin International Film Festival under the working title of the project, Word. The film can be considered quintessential to Kazejak-Dawid's style, as it both touches on a woman-oriented problem (female violence) and relays on young, inexperienced actors (Eliza Rycembel and Mateusz Więcławek).

She is a member of the European Film Academy.

== Awards ==
Award	Year	Movie
Golden Lion	2010	Oda do radości (Ode to joy)
KFF (best movie)	2009	Bocznica
KFF (special jury award)	2009	Bocznica
OFFskar (best movie)	2008	Kilka prostych słów
OFFskar (best director)	2008	Kilka prostych słów
KAN	2004	Jesteś tam

== Director ==
- Glitter (2022)
- Obietnica (2013)
- Bez tajemnic (2011, two episodes)
- Skrzydlate świnie (2010)
- Bocznica (2009)
- Kilka prostych słów (2007)
- Oda do radości (the Silesia segment) (2005)
- Jesteś tam (2004)

== Writer ==
- Obietnica (2013)
- Skrzydlate świnie (2010)
- Bocznica (2009)
- Kilka prostych słów (2007)
- Oda do radości (the Silesia segment) (2005)
- Jesteś tam (2004)

== See also ==
- Anna Kazejak-Dawid at IMDb
- Cinema of Poland
