= Flying Pigs =

2010 film by Anna Kazejak-Dawid

Flying Pigs (Polish: Skrzydlate Świnie) is a 2010 Polish drama film directed by Anna Kazejak-Dawid. It premiered on 5 November 2010 in Poland.

== Plot ==
The story of a group of friends from a small town near Poznań, Grodzisk Wielkopolski, who shared a common passion: football, or rather "active support for a football club". They are connected by a club, divided by a life situation. Oskar Nowacki (35) just became a father. Together with his brother Mariusz (25), he sells religious items in the Basilica of Our Lady of Licheń. Mariusz's girlfriend, Basia (22), accompanies the boys because of their love of support and remnants of attachment to Mariusz, but above all because of their fascination with Oskar.

== Cast ==
- Paweł Małaszyński as Oskar
- Olga Bołądź as Basia
- Piotr Rogucki as Mariusz
- Karolina Gorczyca as Alina
- Cezary Pazura as Krzysztof Dzikowski
- Agata Kulesza as Karina Klaus
- Andrzej Grabowski as Pan Edzio
- Eryk Lubos as "Moher"
- Witold Dębicki as Jan
- Anna Romantowska as Janicka
- Przemysław Saleta as Bodyguard
- Dariusz Biskupski as Bodyguard
- Dorota Zięciowska as Oskar's Mother
- Dominik Bąk as "Żarówa"
- Roman Gancarczyk as Priest
- Bartłomiej Firlet as "Pała".
