= Ewa Dałkowska =

Polish actress (1947–2025)

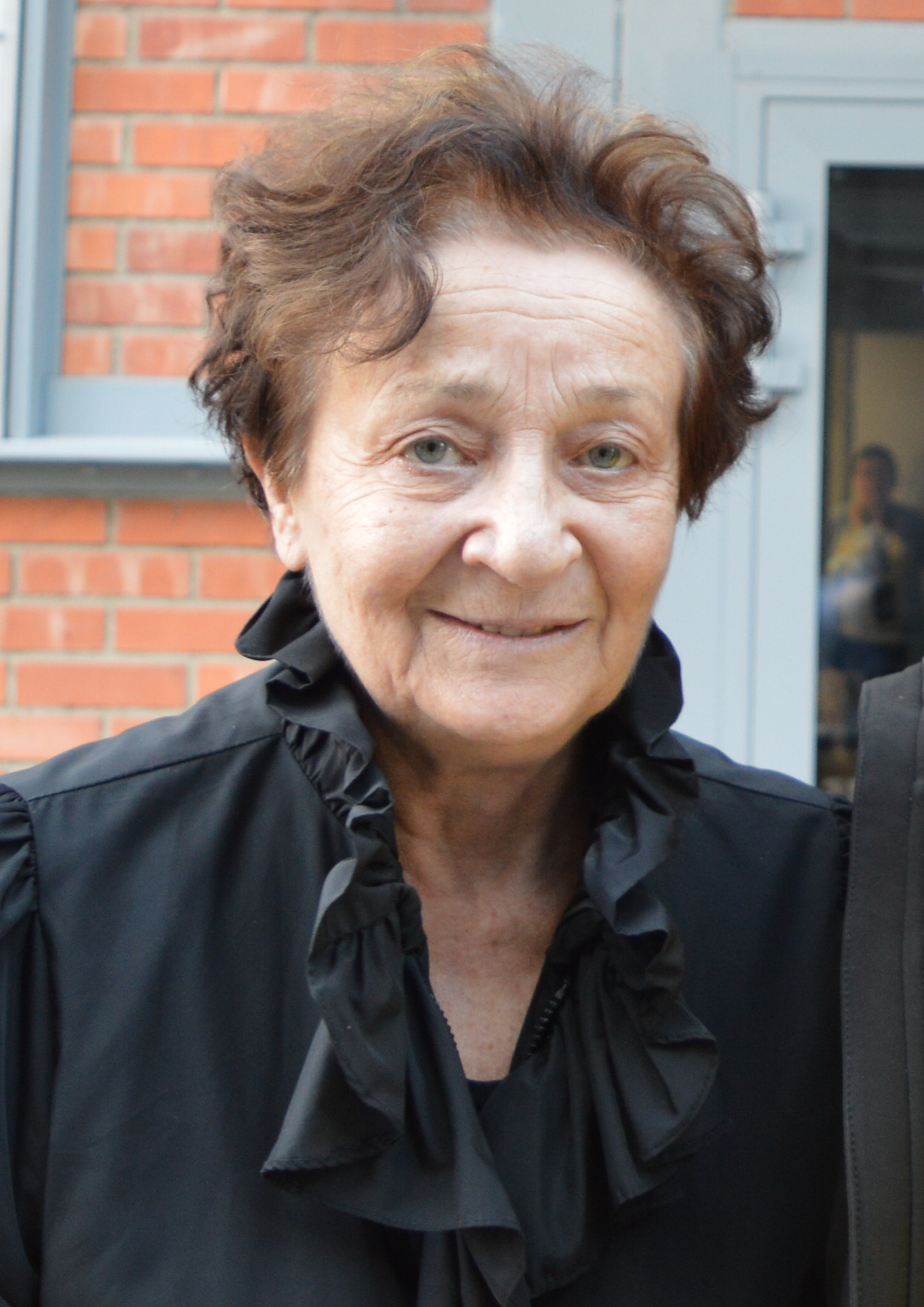
- Born: 10 April 1947; Wrocław, Poland
- Died: 8 June 2025 (aged 78)
- Occupation: Actress
- Years active: 1971–2025

Ewa Dałkowska (10 April 1947 – 8 June 2025) was a Polish actress. She performed in more than 50 films from the 1970s onwards.

== Life and career ==
Dałkowska was born in Wrocław, Poland on 10 April 1947. She graduated from the University of Wrocław in 1970 and from the Aleksander Zelwerowicz National Academy of Dramatic Art in 1972. Thereafter she began appearing on stage and film; her first notable screen role was in the 1975 drama film Nights and Days. She worked with directors such as Andrzej Wajda, Jan Englert, Krystyna Janda, Agnieszka Holland and Krzysztof Zanussi.

During the time of Martial law in Poland (1981–1983), Dałkowska was active in the underground. Her involvement in democratic transformation in Poland brought her the Order of Polonia Restituta, Officer's Cross, in 2007.

Dałkowska died on 8 June 2025, at the age of 78.

== Selected filmography ==
Film
Year	Title	Role	Notes
1975	Nights and Days	Olesia Chrobotówna	
1978	Without Anesthesia	Ewa Michalowska	
1980	Głosy	Ewa Domańska	
1984	A Year of the Quiet Sun	Stella	
1990	Korczak	Stefania Wilczyńska	
2016	Smolensk	Maria Kaczyńska	
2016	Artyści	Helena, the cleaning lady-medium	TV series
