= Maja Ostaszewska =

Polish actress (born 1972)

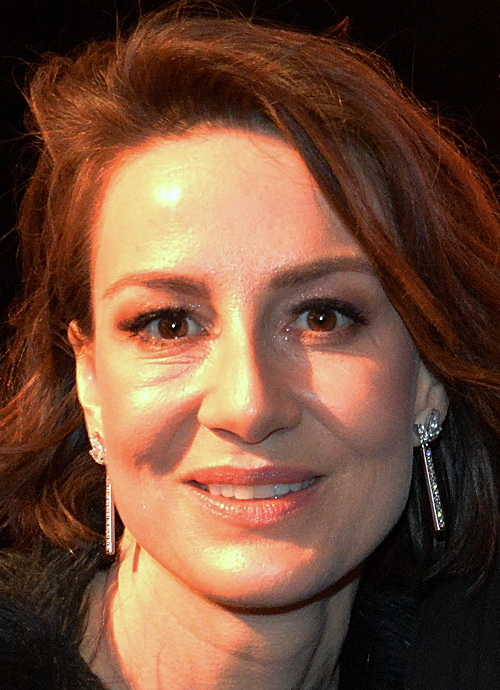
- Ostaszewska in 2018
- Born: 3 September 1972 (age 54); Kraków, Poland
- Occupation: Actress
- Years active: 1993–present
- Partner: Michał Englert
- Children: 2
- Relatives: Jacek Ostaszewski (father)

Maja Ostaszewska (born 3 September 1972) is a Polish actress. She made her screen debut appearing in a small role in the 1993 historical drama film Schindler's List, before playing leading role in the drama film The Haven (1998), for which she received Polish Film Festival Award for Best Actress. She received her second Polish Film Festival Award for Best Actress for Prymas – trzy lata z tysiąca (2000). Since then, Ostaszewska has appeared in more than 30 motion pictures and received seven Polish Academy Award for Best Actress nominations, winning twice: for Jack Strong (2014) and Body (2015).

Ostaszewska starred in films Katyn (2007), In the Name Of (2013), Never Gonna Snow Again (2020), The In-Laws (2021) and its sequels, Broad Peak (2022), Green Border (2023), Colors of Evil: Red (2024) and Chopin, a Sonata in Paris (2025).

== Life and career ==
Ostaszewska was born in Kraków, the daughter of Polish musician Jacek Ostaszewski. Ostaszewska was raised Buddhist. She started her acting training in her native Kraków and later graduated from the PWST in 1996. She has since acted mostly at the Teatr Rozmaitości in Warsaw, working with well-known Polish directors such as Krystian Lupa, Krzysztof Warlikowski and Grzegorz Jarzyna. In 1993, during her acting training, she played a small role in Steven Spielberg's drama film Schindler's List. In her Warsaw stage debut, she appeared in the role of Rosalinde in William Shakespeare's As You Like It (1996).

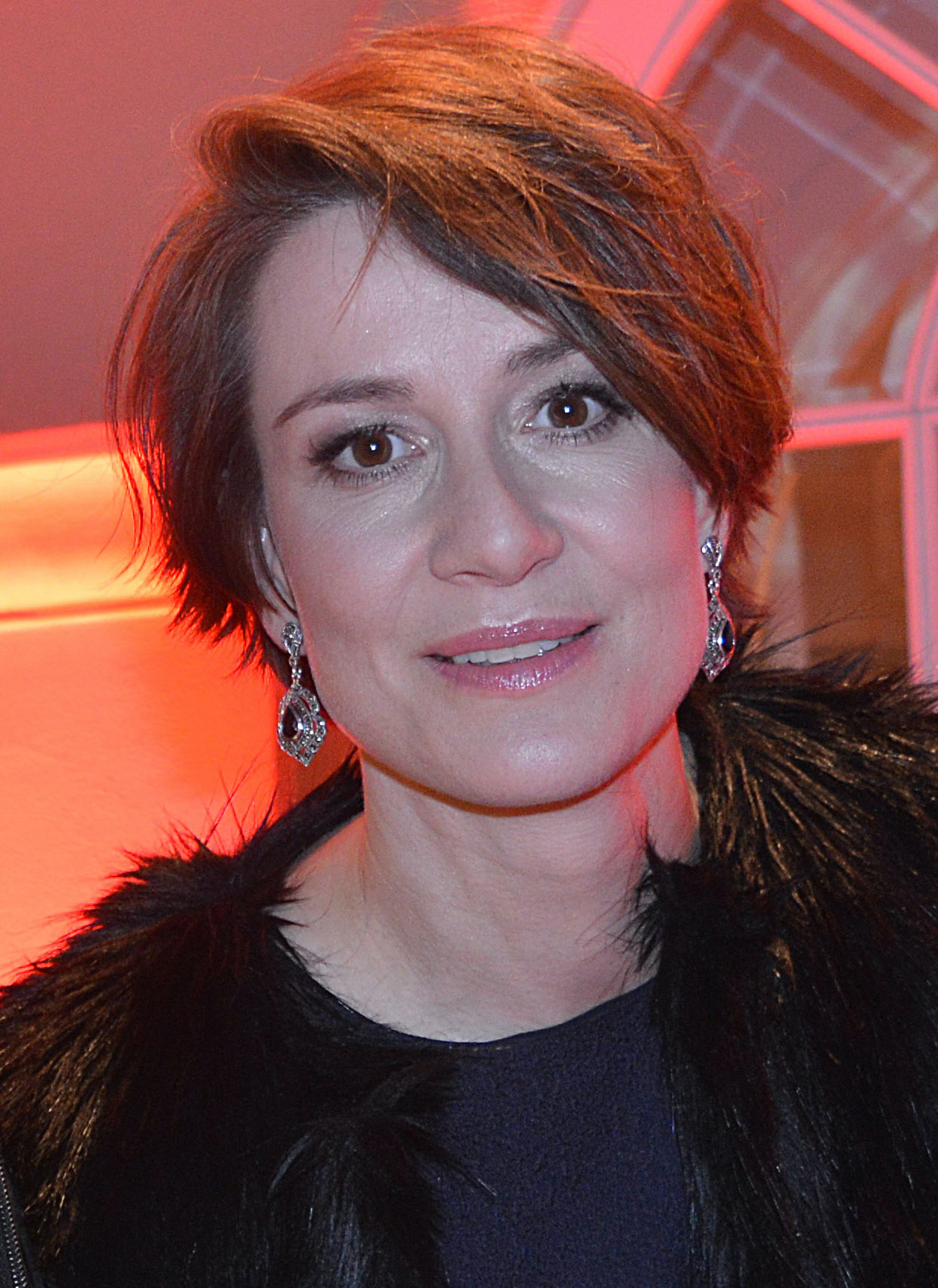
Ostaszewska in 2017

In 1998, Ostaszewska played the leading role in the drama film, The Haven. For this role, she received the Best Actress Award at the Polish Film Festival held in Gdynia. She received her second Polish Film Festival Award for Best Actress and first Polish Academy Award for Best Actress nomination for Prymas – trzy lata z tysiąca (2000). She received Paszport Polityki Award in recognition of her film roles. She received another nomination for Przemiany in 2004. On television, Ostaszewska starred in the drama series, Removals in 2001 and later was regular cast member in the medical drama series, Na dobre i na złe (2003—2008). In 2008, she starred in the first season on the War drama series, Days of Honor and later was regular in the comedy-drama Recipe For Life (2011–2013) and the medical drama Diagnosis (2017–2019). In 2012 she received the Telekamera Award for Best Actress, and in February 2013 she received a Wiktor Award nomination for TV acting. She appeared in the made-for-television movie The Courageous Heart of Irena Sendler (2009) starring Anna Paquin.

Ostaszewska appeared in films Where Eskimos Live and The Pianist in 2002. She played one of the main characters in Academy Award-nominated Andrzej Wajda's historical drama Katyń in 2007. She appeared in the comedy film Ile wazy kon trojanski? (2008) and starred in the drama Janosik: A True Story (2009) directed by Agnieszka Holland. She played the leads in the crime drama film Uwiklanie (2011) and the drama film In the Name Of (2013). She next starred in Jack Strong (2014) and Body (2015), receiving Polish Academy Award for Best Actress in 2015 and 2016.

In 2020, Ostaszewska starred in the comedy-drama film Never Gonna Snow Again receiving another Polish Academy Award nomination for Best Actress. It was selected as the Polish entry for the Best International Feature Film at the 93rd Academy Awards, but failed to receive a nomination. The following year, she starred in the crime drama series, Klangor. She starred in the comedy film The In-Laws (2021) and the biographical drama film Broad Peak (2022). In 2023, Ostaszewska starred in the drama film Green Border directed by Agnieszka Holland. In 2024, she starred in the murder-mystery film, Colors of Evil: Red for Netflix. She later was cast in the Netflix miniseries, Projekt UFO. In 2025, Ostaszewska played 2025Tekla Justyna Chopin in the biographical drama film, Chopin, a Sonata in Paris and the following year Baronowa Krzeszowska in the period drama The Doll. In 2026 she also starred in the HBO Max drama series, Proud.

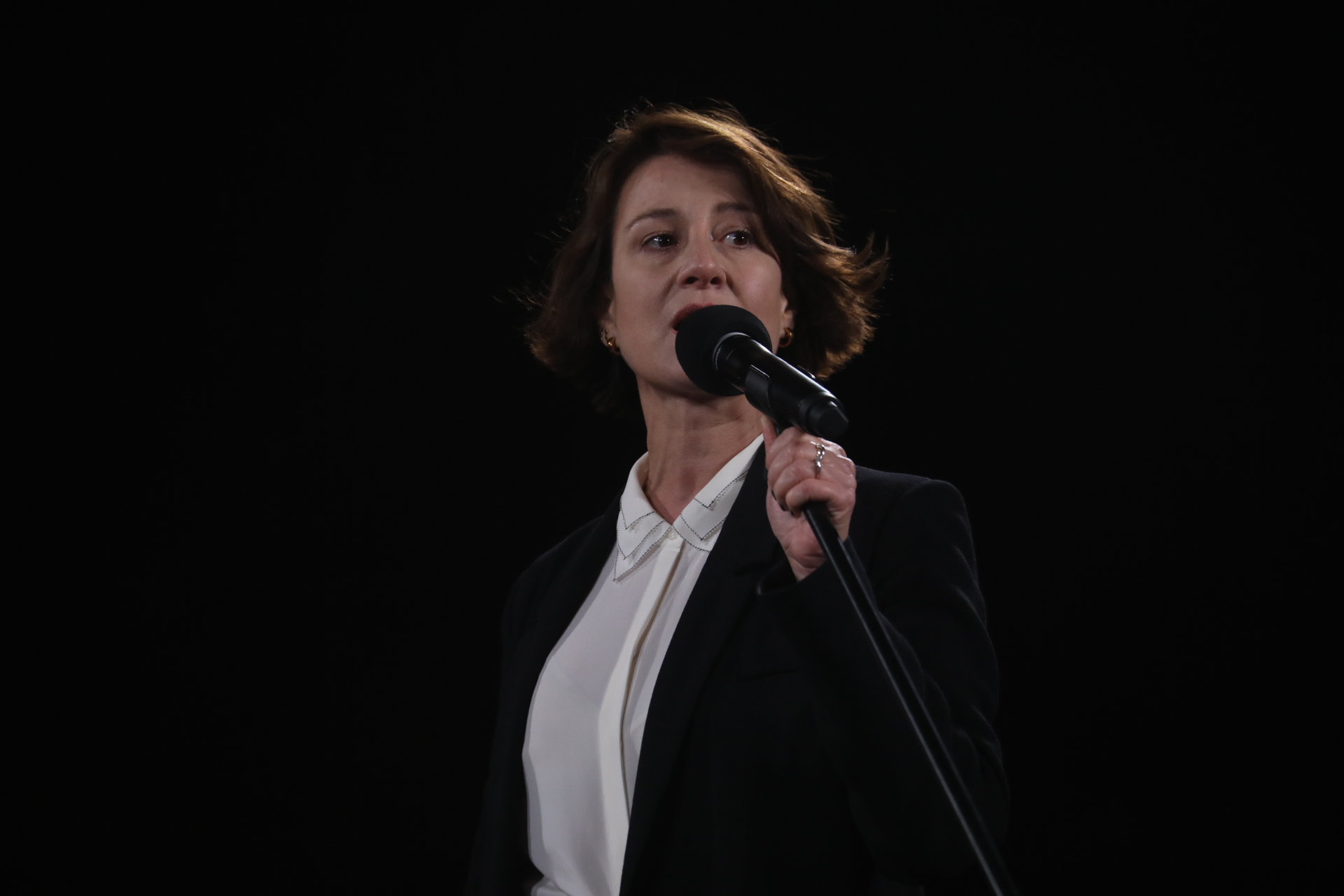
Maja Ostaszewska, 2021

== Personal life ==
Ostaszewska is in a relationship with Polish cinematographer Michał Englert, son of actor Maciej Englert. They have two children, son Franciszek (born 2007) and daughter Janina (born 2009). Ostaszewska is a vegetarian and Buddhist. She is also known for her support of the LGBT community.

== Filmography ==
=== Film ===
Year	Title	Role	Notes
1993	Schindler's List	Frantic Woman	
1998	The Haven	Karolina	Polish Film Festival Award for Best Actress
2000	I'm Looking at You, Mary	Marysia Orzechowska	Polish Film Festival Award for Best Actress
2000	Prymas – trzy lata z tysiąca	Sister Leonia	Nominated — Polish Academy Award for Best Actress
2000	Egoiści	Client at an advertising agency	
2002	Where Eskimos Live	Girl at the hotel	
2002	The Pianist	Woman with Child	
2003	Changes	Marta Mycinska	Nominated — Polish Academy Award for Best Actress
2005	Solidarność, Solidarność...	Adult Maja	
2006	S@motność w sieci	Doctor	
2007	Katyn	Anna	
2008	Ile waży koń trojański?	Lidka	
2009	Janosik: A True Story	Margeta	
2011	Uwikłanie	Agata Szacka	
2013	In the Name Of	Ewa	
2013	Dom na koncu drogi	Wife	Short film
2014	Jack Strong	Hania	Polish Academy Award for Best Actress
2015	A Grain of Truth	Weronika Szacka	voice
2015	Body	Anna	Polish Academy Award for Best Actress; New York Polish Film Festival Award for Best Actress
2015	Panie Dulskie	Melania Dulska	
2016	Pitbull: Nowe porządki	Olka	
2016	Pitbull: Tough Women	Olka	
2018	7 Emotions	Mother of Adas & Miki	
2019	I Am Lying Now	Celia	
2019	(Nie)znajomi	Anna	
2020	Kill It and Leave This Town	Janek	Voice
2020	Never Gonna Snow Again	Maria	Nominated — Polish Academy Award for Best Actress
2020	Nightwalk	Girl's Mother	Short film
2020	Magnesium	Róza Lewenfisz	
2021	The In-Laws	Małgorzata Wilk	
2022	Broad Peak	Ewa Dyakowska-Berbeka	Nominated — Polish Academy Award for Best Supporting Actress
2023	Green Border	Julia	Nominated — Polish Academy Award for Best Actress
2023	The In-Laws 2	Małgorzata Wilk	
2024	Colors of Evil: Red	Helena Bogucka	
2025	The In-Laws 3	Małgorzata Wilk	
2025	Chopin, a Sonata in Paris	Tekla Justyna Chopin	
2026	The Doll	Baroness Krzeszowska	

=== Television ===
Year	Title	Role	Notes
1996—2016	Teatr Telewizji	Various	28 episodes
2001	Removals	Celina Szczygiel	10 episodes
2003—2008	Na dobre i na złe	Małgorzata Donovan	114 episodes
2008	Days of Honor	Wanda	13 episodes
2009	The Courageous Heart of Irena Sendler	Jadwiga	Television film
2011—2013	Recipe For Life	Beata Darmięta	65 episodes
2016—2017	Druga szansa	Lidka Rak	30 episodes
2017—2018	Diagnosis	Anna Nowak	52 episodes
2021	The Office PL	Arleta Mosul	Episode: "No to szklo"
2021	Klangor	Magda Wejman	7 episodes
2025	Project UFO	Wera Wierusz	4 episodes
2026	Proud	Beata	8 episodes
