= Michał Kwieciński =

Polish film producer and director (born 1951)

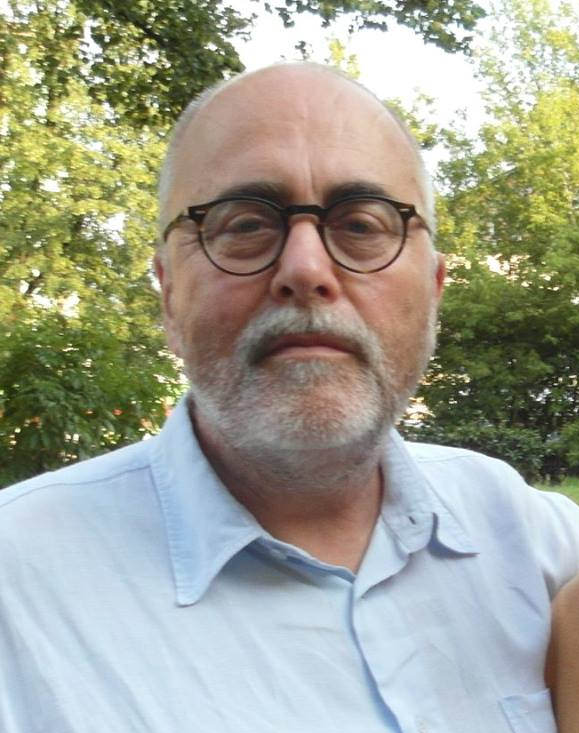
- Kwieciński in 2015
- Born: 1 May 1951 (age 75); Warsaw, Poland
- Education: Polish Academy of Sciences; National Academy of Dramatic Art
- Occupations: Producer; director; screenwriter
- Years active: 1996–present

Michał Kwieciński (Polish pronunciation: [ˈmi.xaw kfjɛˈt͡ɕiɲ.ski]; born 1 May 1951) is a Polish producer, director, and screenwriter. He founded the production company Akson Studio.

== Early life ==
Kwieciński earned a doctorate in organic chemistry from the Polish Academy of Sciences before later deciding to pursue film, graduating from the Faculty of Directing and Drama at the National Academy of Dramatic Art.

== Career ==
In 1992, Kwieciński founded the production company Akson Studio. In 2006, he directed his feature directorial debut, Statyści, which won a Special Jury Prize at the Polish Film Festival. For his 2022 film Filip, Kwieciński won the Silver Lion for Best Director at the Polish Film Festival.

== Filmography ==
=== Film ===
Year	Title	Director	Screenwriter	Producer
1996	Andrzej Wajda. Moje notatki z historii	No	No	Yes
2000	Mała Vilma	No	No	Yes
2002	The Revenge	No	No	Yes
2005	Solidarność, Solidarność...	No	No	Yes
2005	Oda do radości	No	No	Yes
2006	Statyści	Yes	No	Yes
2007	Katyń	No	No	Yes
2008	Drzazgi	No	No	Yes
2009	Tatarak	No	No	Yes
2010	Wenecja	No	No	Yes
2010	Flying Pigs	No	No	Yes
2010	Joanna	No	No	Yes
2012	Shameless	No	No	Yes
2013	Walesa: Man of Hope	No	No	Yes
2014	Warsaw 44	No	No	Yes
2016	Afterimage	No	No	Yes
2018	Miłość jest wszystkim	Yes	No	Yes
2022	Filip	Yes	Yes	Yes
2025	Chopin, a Sonata in Paris	Yes	No	Yes

=== Television ===
Year	Title	Director	Screenwriter	Producer	Notes
1997	The Clan	No	No	Yes	
1999	Rodzina zastępcza	Yes	Yes	Yes	
1999	Palce lizać	Yes	No	No	
2003	Biała sukienka	Yes	No	No	Television film
2004	Stacyjka	No	No	Yes	
2004	Oficer	No	No	Yes	
2005	Magda M.	No	No	Yes	
2007	Jutro idziemy do kina	Yes	No	No	Television film
2007	Twarzą w twarz	No	No	Yes	
2008	Teraz albo nigdy!	No	No	Yes	
2008	Trzeci oficer	No	No	Yes	
2012–2025	Friends	No	No	Yes	
2026	The Doll	No	No	Yes	
