= 2025 Polish Film Awards =

27th Polish Film Awards
- Date: 10 March 2025
- Site: Polish Theatre, Warsaw, Poland
- Hosted by: Grażyna Torbicka

Highlights
- Best Film: The Girl with the Needle
- Most awards: The Girl with the Needle (11)
- Most nominations: White Courage (15)

Television coverage
- Network: TVP Kultura; TVP1

The 27th Polish Film Awards took place on 10 March 2025 at the Polish Theatre in Warsaw, Poland. The ceremony honored the best in Polish cinema of 2024, presented by the Polish Film Academy. It was hosted by television host Grażyna Torbicka and broadcast on TVP Kultura and TVP1.

Psychological drama film The Girl with the Needle won the most awards with eleven, including Best Film. It tied Corpus Christi (2019) for the most Polish Film Awards won by a film in history. Production designer Allan Starski was honored with the Life Achievement Award.

== Winners and nominations ==
The nominations were announced on 12 February 2025. War drama film White Courage led the nominations with fifteen, followed by psychological horror film The Girl with the Needle with thirteen and biographical drama film Kulej: All That Glitters Isn't Gold with nine.

=== Awards ===
Winners are listed first, highlighted in boldface, and indicated with a double dagger (‡).

**Best Film**: **The Girl with the Needle – Directed by Magnus von Horn**‡; It's Not My Film – Directed by Maria Zbąska; Kulej: All That Glitters Isn't Gold – Directed by Xawery Żuławski; White Courage – Directed by Marcin Koszałka; The Zone of Interest – Directed by Jonathan Glazer	**Best European Film**: **Anatomy of a Fall – Directed by Justine Triet (France)**‡; 20 Days in Mariupol – Directed by Mstyslav Chernov (Ukraine / United States); Conclave – Directed by Edward Berger (United Kingdom / United States); Emilia Pérez – Directed by Jacques Audiard (France); Poor Things – Directed by Yorgos Lanthimos (United States / Ireland / United Kingdom)
**Best TV Series**: **The Mothers of Penguins – Directed by Klara Kochańska-Bajon and Jagoda Szelc (Netflix)**‡; Go Ahead, Brother – Directed by Maciej Pieprzyca (Netflix); Lady Love – Directed by Bartosz Konopka (Max); The Mire – Directed by Jan Holoubek (Netflix); Śleboda – Directed by Michał Gazda and Bartosz Blaschke (SkyShowtime)	**Best Director**: **Magnus von Horn – The Girl with the Needle**‡; Jonathan Glazer – The Zone of Interest; Kamila Tarabura – Travel Essentials; Marcin Koszałka – White Courage; Maria Zbąska – It's Not My Film
**Best Actor**: **Filip Pławiak – White Courage as Andrzej Zawrat**‡; Jacek Borusiński – Wróbel as Remigiusz "Remek" Wróbel; Marcin Dorociński – Minghun as Jurek; Maciej Damięcki – Night Silence as Lucjan; Tomasz Włosok – Kulej: All That Glitters Isn't Gold as Jerzy Kulej	**Best Actress**: **Vic Carmen Sonne – The Girl with the Needle as Karoline**‡; Małgorzata Hajewska-Krzysztofik – Woman Of... as Aniela; Michalina Olszańska – Kulej: All That Glitters Isn't Gold as Helena Jankiewicz-Kulej; Sandra Drzymalska – Simona Kossak as Simona Kossak; Sandra Drzymalska – White Courage as Bronka Wetula
**Best Supporting Actor**: **Julian Świeżewski – White Courage as Maciek Zawrat**‡; Andrzej Chyra – Kulej: All That Glitters Isn't Gold as Feliks Stamm; Jakub Gierszał – White Courage as Wolfram von Kamitz; Kieran Culkin – A Real Pain as Benjamin "Benji" Kaplan; Zdzisław Wardejn – Night Silence as Edward	**Best Supporting Actress**: **Trine Dyrholm – The Girl with the Needle as Dagmar**‡; Agata Kulesza – Simona Kossak as Elżbieta Kossak; Joanna Kulig – Woman Of... as Iza; Małgorzata Hajewska-Krzysztofik – Travel Essentials as Karolina; Wiktoria Gorodeckaja – White Courage as Helena
**Best Screenplay**: **The Girl with the Needle – Magnus von Horn and Line Langebek**‡; Kulej: All That Glitters Isn't Gold – Rafał Lipski and Xawery Żuławski; Minghun – Grzegorz Łoszewski; A Real Pain – Jesse Eisenberg; White Courage – Marcin Koszałka and Łukasz M. Maciejewski; The Zone of Interest – Jonathan Glazer	**Best Cinematography**: **The Girl with the Needle – Michał Dymek**‡; Minghun – Kacper Fertacz; White Courage – Marcin Koszałka; Woman Of... – Michał Englert; The Zone of Interest – Łukasz Żal
**Best Production Design**: **The Girl with the Needle – Jagna Dobesz**‡; The Battle of Monte Cassino – Marek Warszewski; Simona Kossak – Agata Adamus; White Courage – Elwira Pluta; Woman Of... – Marek Zawierucha; The Zone of Interest – Chris Oddy	**Best Makeup and Hairstyling**: **The Girl with the Needle – Anne Cathrine Sauerberg**‡; The Battle of Monte Cassino – Karolina Kordas; Kleks Academy 2 – Karolina Kordas, Alina Janerka, and Wanda Tatucha-Kędzierzawska; Kulej: All That Glitters Isn't Gold – Agnieszka Hodowana; Minghun – Pola Guźlińska; Our Folks: The Beginning – Pola Guźlińska; White Courage – Dariusz Krysiak
**Best Costume Design**: **The Girl with the Needle – Małgorzata Fudala**‡; Kulej: All That Glitters Isn't Gold – Anna Englert; Simona Kossak – Paulina Sieniarska and Kalina Lach; White Courage – Małgorzata Gwiazdecka and Joanna Pamuła; The Zone of Interest – Małgorzata Karpiuk	**Best Film Score**: **The Girl with the Needle – Frederikke Hoffmeier**‡; Diabeł – Łukasz Targosz; Go Against the Flow – KSU and Eugeniusz Olejarczyk; The Horse Tail – Mikołaj Trzaska; Kulej: All That Glitters Isn't Gold – Jan Komar, Mikołaj Majkusiak, and Bartłomiej Tyciński; Simona Kossak – Bartosz Chajdecki; White Courage – Jacek Grudzień; Wróbel – Tomasz Gąssowski
**Best Sound**: **The Zone of Interest – Johnnie Burn and Tarn Willers**‡; The Girl with the Needle – Oskar Skriver; Plan Petera – Joanna Napieralska and Mikołaj Tyrakowski; White Courage – Michał Fojcik, Tomasz Wieczorek, and Leszek Freund; Wrooklyn Zoo – Bartosz Putkiewicz and Artur Kuczkowski	**Best Editing**: **The Girl with the Needle – Agnieszka Glińska**‡; Kulej: All That Glitters Isn't Gold – Wojtek Włodarski; The Last Expedition – Bartosz Pietras; The Seasons – Ireneusz Grzyb; White Courage – Agnieszka Glińska; Woman Of... – Jarosław Kamiński; Wrooklyn Zoo – Sebastian Mialik
**Best Documentary**: **The Last Expedition – Directed by Eliza Kubarska**‡; 8th Day of Khamsin – Directed by Zvika Gregory Portnoy; Forest – Directed by Lidia Duda; Silent Trees – Directed by Agnieszka Zwiefka; When Harmattan Blows – Directed by Edyta Wróblewska	**Discovery of the Year**: **Maria Zbąska – It's Not My Film (Directing)**‡; Frederikke Hoffmeier – The Girl with the Needle (Score); Gabriela Muskała – The Clowns (Directing); Kamila Tarabura – Travel Essentials (Directing); Tomasz Gąssowski – Wróbel (Directing)
**Audience Award**: **Kulej: All That Glitters Isn't Gold**‡; The Girl with the Needle; It's Not My Film; White Courage; The Zone of Interest	**Life Achievement Award**: **Allan Starski**

=== Films with multiple nominations and awards ===
Films that received multiple nominations
Nominations	Film
15	White Courage
13	The Girl with the Needle
11	Kulej: All That Glitters Isn't Gold
7	The Zone of Interest
5	Simona Kossak
5	Woman Of...
4	Minghun
3	It's Not My Film
3	Travel Essentials
3	Wróbel
2	The Battle of Monte Cassino
2	The Last Expedition
2	Night Silence
2	A Real Pain
2	Wrooklyn Zoo

Films that received multiple awards
Awards	Film
11	The Girl with the Needle
2	White Courage
