= Mateusz Pacewicz =

Polish screenwriter and film director (born 1992)

- Born: 21 June 1992 (age 34); Warsaw, Poland
- Education: University of Warsaw
- Occupations: Screenwriter; filmmaker
- Years active: 2015–present
- Parents: Piotr Pacewicz (father); Alicja Pacewicz (mother)

Mateusz Piotr Pacewicz (born 21 June 1992, Warsaw) is a Polish award-winning screenwriter and film director.

== Life and career ==
He is a graduate of the Inter-area Individual Humanistic and Social Studies (MISH) of the University of Warsaw. In 2017, he wrote the script and directed Heat (in collaboration with Agata Trzebuchowska), a short film nominated for The Short Film Grand Jury Prize at Sundance Film Festival. In 2019, he received the Best Screenplay Award for Jan Komasa's Academy Award-nominated film Corpus Christi at the 44th Gdynia Film Festival. He also won two Polish Film Awards for Best Screenplay as well as the Discovery of the Year Award for Corpus Christi. In 2020, he was also nominated for the Paszport Polityki Award in the film category.

In 2020, he wrote the screenplay to another film directed by Komasa The Hater, a spin-off of the 2011 drama film Suicide Room.

== Personal life ==
He was born on 21 June 1992 in Warsaw to father Piotr Pacewicz and mother Alicja. When asked about his inspirations in an interview, he named the New Testament, Hermann Broch's The Tempter, René Girard's The Scapegoat and Carlo Ginzburg's The Cheese and the Worms as the books which influenced his work.

== Filmography ==
- Heat, 2017 (co-directed with Agata Trzebuchowska)
- Corpus Christi, 2019 (screenplay)
- The Hater, 2020 (screenplay)
- Stymulanty & Empatogeny, 2024 (written and directed by, short film)

== See also ==
- Polish cinema
- Polish Film Awards
