= Colors of Evil: Black =

Mystery film directed by Adrian Panek

- Directed by: Adrian Panek
- Written by: Adrian Panek
- Based on: Colors of Evil: Black by Małgorzata Oliwia Sobczak
- Produced by: Leszek Bodzak; Aneta Cebula-Hickinbotham
- Starring: Jakub Gierszał; Marianna Zydek; Andrzej Chyra
- Cinematography: Karina Kleszczewska
- Edited by: Piotr Kmiecik
- Music by: Bartosz Chajdecki
- Production company: Aurum Film
- Distributed by: Netflix
- Release date: 10 June 2026
- Running time: 110 minutes
- Country: Poland
- Language: Polish

Colors of Evil: Black (Polish: Kolory zła: Czerń) is a 2026 Polish mystery crime thriller film written and directed by Adrian Panek and based on the novel of the same name by Małgorzata Oliwia Sobczak. It is the sequel for 2024 film Colors of Evil: Red. The film stars Jakub Gierszał, Marianna Zydek and Andrzej Chyra. It follows prosecutor Leopold Bilski who starts searching for a missing child in a small town.

The film was released on 10 June 2026, by Netflix.

== Plot ==
In the small Kashubian town of Trulocz, a young boy vanishes without a trace.

== Cast ==
Source.

- Jakub Gierszał as Leopold Bilski
- Marianna Zydek as Julia Sarman
- Andrzej Chyra as Andrzej Pakosz
- Beata Scibakówna as Fabiola Burchardt
- Adam Bobik as Patryk Deczer
- Robert Gonera as Commander Adamczyk
- Piotr Żurawski as Arek Filipiak
- Jan Sałasiński as prosecutor
- Julian Świeżewski as Michał Pakosz

== Filming location ==
Although the plot is set in Kashubia, the location for filming was actually in the town of Gniew, located in the neighbouring but distinct ethnocultural region of Kociewie. The fictional town of Trulocz was created by the film's director Panek and based on the Kashubian town of Kartuzy, which featured in the original book by Sobczak. The fictional town's name is derived from the Kashubian language word, trulôcz, for a common crane.

== Reception ==
Colors of Evil: Black received mixed reviews from critics.

Film critic Barbara Shulgasser-Parker from Common Sense Media gave it a negative review and 2/5 stars wrote in her review: "When Colors of Evil: Black is acting like a detective story, it moves from one plot point to the next with a certain solid rhythm. But the more convoluted the plot becomes, the more that rhythm is disrupted. This requires characters to take a moment to explain, at length, what's going on and what happened 20 years ago." Jonathon Wilson from Ready Steady Cut gave it 3.5/5 stars.
