= Adrian Panek =

Polish screenwriter and director

- Born: 1975 (age 50–51); Wrocław, Polish People's Republic
- Education: Wrocław University of Science and Technology; Krzysztof Kieślowski Film School; Polish Film School
- Occupations: Director; screenwriter

Adrian Panek (born 1975) is a Polish screenwriter and director.

== Biography ==
Panek was born in Wrocław and attended Wrocław University of Science and Technology. He graduated from the Krzysztof Kieślowski Film School, and from the Polish Film School. He is a member of the Polish Film Academy. He got his start directing music videos before making his big screen debut with the 2011 drama film, Daas receiving nomination at the Polish Film Awards and Polish Film Festival. He won Best Director Award at the 2018 Polish Film Festival for his second feature, Werewolf.

Panek later directed television series include The Trap, Open Your Eyes, Powrót, Raven and Pati. He directed and wrote the mystery films Colors of Evil: Red (2024) and its sequel Colors of Evil: Black (2026), and the biographical films Simona Kossak (2024) and Wanda (2026).

== Filmography ==
  - Feature films
- Daas (2011)
- Werewolf (2018)
- Colors of Evil: Red (2024)
- Simona Kossak (2024)
- Colors of Evil: Black (2026)
- Wanda (2026)
  - Television
- Commission of Murders (2016)
- The Trap (2019)
- Kod genetyczny (2020)
- Open Your Eyes (2021)
- Powrót (2022)
- Nieobecni (2022)
- Raven (2022)
- Pati (2025)
