= Komasa =

Komasa (plural: Komasowie, commonly meaning "Komasa family") is a Polish-language surname. The Komasa family is sometimes described as an "artistic clan" of film actors and directors, singers, and musicians.

Notable people with this surname include:

- Jan Komasa (born 1981), Polish film director, screenwriter, and producer
- Szymon Komasa (born 1985), Polish operatic baritone
- Wiesław Komasa (born 1949), Polish stage, film, TV, and dubbing actor and stage director
- Antoni Łazarkiewicz a.k.a. Antoni Komasa-Łazarkiewicz, Polish composer
