= Breaking the Limits =

2017 film directed by Łukasz Palkowski

- Theatrical release poster
- Polish: Najlepszy
- Directed by: Łukasz Palkowski
- Written by: Agatha Dominik; Maciej Karpiński
- Produced by: Krzysztof Szpetmański
- Starring: Jakub Gierszał
- Cinematography: Piotr Sobociński Jr.
- Edited by: Jarosław Barzan
- Music by: Bartosz Chajdecki
- Production companies: Iron Films; Polsat; Odra-Film; Lutetia; Cavatina Studio; Monternia.pl
- Distributed by: Mówi Serwis
- Release dates: 21 September 2017 (Polish Film Festival); 17 November 2017 (Poland)
- Running time: 104 minutes
- Country: Poland
- Language: Polish
- Box office: $4 241 561

Breaking the Limits (Polish: Najlepszy) is a 2017 Polish biographical film directed by Łukasz Palkowski about the life of Jerzy Górski. The film stars Jakub Gierszał as Górski. The film ranked fourth on the list of the most-watched Polish films of 2017 and received numerous audience awards.

== Plot ==
The film follows Górski, beginning with the onset of his addiction to drugs. After the mother of his daughter dies of an overdose, Górski begins an intensive training regime and eventually becomes an Ironman Triathlon champion.

== Cast ==
- Jakub Gierszał as Jerzy Górski
- Kamila Kamińska as Ewa Meller
- Anna Próchniak as Grażyna
- Arkadiusz Jakubik as swimming pool manager
- Janusz Gajos as Marek Kotański
- Artur Żmijewski as Jerzy's father
- Magdalena Cielecka as Jerzy's mother
- Adam Woronowicz as Grażyna's father
- Szymon Piotr Warszawski as Paweł
- Mateusz Kościukiewicz as Andrzej
- Tomasz Kot as Okoń
- Delfina Wilkońska as Halina
- Jakub Zając as Krzysiek
- Zbigniew Paterak as Wolski

== Awards ==
The film has won a total of six awards at the 42nd Polish Film Festival in Gdynia.
