= Łukasz M. Maciejewski =

Polish screenwriter (born 1980)

- Born: 14 November 1980 (age 45); Wałcz
- Citizenship: Polish
- Occupation: Screenwriter
- Years active: 2007–

Łukasz M. Maciejewski (born 14 November 1980) is a Polish screenwriter.

== Filmography ==
- The Red Spider (2015)
- The King of Warsaw (2020)
- The Getaway King (2021)
- Braty (2022)
- Ukryta sieć (2023)
- Dzień matki (2023)
- White Courage (2024)
- Kolory zła. Czerwień (2024)

Source.

== Accolades ==
For the screenplay of White Courage, together with Marcin Koszałka he won award for the best screenplay at the Polish Film Festival and earned nomination for the best screenplay at the 2025 Polish Film Awards.
