= The Hater (2020 film) =

2020 Polish film by Jan Komasa

- Theatrical release poster
- Polish: Sala samobójców. Hejter
- Directed by: Jan Komasa
- Written by: Mateusz Pacewicz
- Produced by: Jerzy Kapuściński; Wojciech Kabarowski
- Starring: Maciej Musiałowski; Agata Kulesza; Danuta Stenka; Vanessa Aleksander; Maciej Stuhr; Jacek Koman; Adam Gradowski
- Cinematography: Radek Ładczuk
- Edited by: Aleksandra Gowin
- Music by: Michał Jacaszek
- Production companies: Naima Film; dFlights; TVN; Canal+; Coloroffon
- Distributed by: Kino Świat
- Release date: 6 March 2020
- Running time: 135 minutes
- Country: Poland
- Language: Polish
- Box office: $1.3 million

The Hater (Polish: Sala samobójców. Hejter) is a 2020 Polish social thriller film directed by Jan Komasa and written by Mateusz Pacewicz. The plot centres around an expelled university student from Warsaw who attempts to steer the internet, causing widespread hatred and violence. It premiered on 6 March 2020 in Poland and went on to win the Best International Narrative Feature Award at Tribeca Film Festival.

== Premise ==
Tomasz Giemza, a disgraced law student obsessed with the progressive, upper-class Krasucki family, takes a job at a public relations company. What seemed like just another assignment turns out to be a quickly developing troll farm, where he excels in the business of spreading fake news and online hatred targeting famous personalities, internet celebrities and politicians. With time, Tomasz begins to use his newly acquired skills in order to stalk, harass and ultimately control the Krasuckis.

== Cast ==
- Maciej Musiałowski as Tomasz Giemza
- Vanessa Aleksander as Gabriela 'Gabi' Krasucka
- Agata Kulesza as Beata Santorska
- Danuta Stenka as Zofia Krasucka
- Jacek Koman as Robert Krasucki
- Maciej Stuhr as Paweł Rudnicki
- Adam Gradowski as Stefan 'Guzek' Guzkowski
- Jedrzej Wielecki as Staszek Rydel

== Production ==
Principal photography began on 28 October 2018 and ended on 22 December. It was primarily filmed in Warsaw and surrounding areas.

The Hater is considered a sequel or a spin-off to Komasa's previous Suicide Room (2011).

=== Release ===
The Hater was released in Poland on 6 March 2020. However, a few days after its release, cinemas and movie theaters were closed due to the COVID-19 pandemic. It was distributed worldwide in streaming by Netflix on 29 July 2020 although later removed in 2025.

== Reception ==
=== Critical response ===
On review aggregator Rotten Tomatoes, the film holds an approval rating of 87% based on 23 reviews with an average rating of 7.5/10. The website's critics consensus reads, "The Hater can get carried away in its contrivances, but thriller fans will enjoy its ambitious and frenzied style." On Metacritic, it holds a weighted average score of 61 out of 100, based on 5 critics, indicating "generally favorable reviews".

Ola Salwa on Cineuropa stated, "The Hater is a thrilling tale of an anti-hero and of the survival of the fittest, which in this case means those who have a strong and agile thumb and index finger." Brian Tallerico from RogerEbert.com praised the film's "interesting" moral narrative. Variety positively reviewed the plot, stating that it "effectively integrates concerns about how easily people are manipulated". In an enthusiastic review for the Krakow Post, Giuseppe Sedia wrote, "Komasa deserves kudos for showing the process of polarization at work in Polish society, with all that the mayhem this could entail."

=== Awards ===
The Hater premiered at [MIlF International Film Festival]] in the International Narrative Competition and won Best International Narrative Feature award. The jury comprised film professionals among whom were Danny Boyle and William Hurt.
