= White Courage =

2024 Polish war drama film by Marcin Koszałka

- Promotional poster
- Polish: Biała odwaga
- Directed by: Marcin Koszałka
- Written by: Marcin Koszałka; Łukasz M. Maciejewski
- Produced by: Magdalena Kamińska; Agata Szymańska
- Starring: Filip Pławiak; Julian Świeżewski; Sandra Drzymalska; Adam Woronowicz; Jakub Gierszał
- Cinematography: Marcin Koszałka
- Edited by: Agnieszka Glińska
- Music by: Jacek Grudzień
- Production company: Balapolis
- Distributed by: Monolith Films
- Release date: 8 March 2024 (Poland)
- Running time: 116 minutes
- Country: Poland
- Language: Polish

White Courage (Polish: Biała odwaga) is a 2024 Polish war drama film directed by Marcin Koszałka from a screenplay he wrote with Łukasz M. Maciejewski. Set at the end of 1930s in Podhale, it stars Filip Pławiak and Julian Świeżewski as brothers who come into conflict after the death of their father.

The film was theatrically released in Poland in 8 March 2024. At the 2025 Polish Film Awards, the film led with fifteen nominations and won two awards: Best Actor for Pławiak and Best Supporting Actor for Świeżewski.

== Cast ==
- Filip Pławiak as Jędrek Zawrat
- Julian Świeżewski as Maciek Zawrat
- Sandra Drzymalska as Bronka Wetula
- Adam Woronowicz as UB officer
- Jakub Gierszał as Wolfram von Kamitz
- Andrzej Pieczyński as Jędrek and Maciek's grandfather
- Marcin Bosak as Opler
- Wiktoria Gorodeckaja as Helena
- Nikodem Marecki as Bronka's brother
- Andrzej Konopka as "Skorus" Wetula, father of Bronka
- Alona Szostak as the mother of Bronka
- Juliusz Chrząstowski as Zawrat, father of Jędrek and Maciek
- Marcin Czarnik as the partisan "Piorun"
- Rafael Stachowiak as Bruno Berg
- Joachim Paul Assböck as the governor
- Katarzyna Zawadzka as the governor's wife

== Production ==
In July 2020, it was reported that the project received a production grant from the Polish Film Institute. The project was presented at the Polish Days during the 2023 New Horizons Film Festival.

== Release ==
White Courage was released theatrically in Poland on 8 March 2024. It garnered more than 273,000 admissions during its theatrical run and became the 27th highest-grossing film of the year in Poland. It competed for the Golden Atlas at the 2024 Arras Film Festival. The film competed at the Directors' Debuts section at the 32nd International Film Festival of the Art of Cinematography Camerimage.

== Miniseries ==
The three-episode miniseries of the same name was released on Amazon Prime Video on 24 May 2024. It featured scenes cut from the theatrical version.

== Accolades ==
Award	Date of ceremony	Category	Recipient(s)	Result	Ref.
Polish Film Festival	28 September 2024	Best Director	Marcin Koszałka	Won	
Polish Film Festival	28 September 2024	Best Screenplay	Łukasz M. Maciejewski and Marcin Koszałka	Won	
Polish Film Festival	28 September 2024	Best Actress in a Leading Role	Sandra Drzymalska	Won	
Polish Film Festival	28 September 2024	Best Actor in a Supporting Role	Julian Świeżewski	Won	
Zbigniew Cybulski Award	28 January 2025	Zbigniew Cybulski Award	Filip Pławiak	Nominated	
Zbigniew Cybulski Award	28 January 2025	Zbigniew Cybulski Award	Julian Świeżewski	Won	
Polish Film Awards	10 March 2025	Best Film	Marcin Koszałka	Nominated	
Polish Film Awards	10 March 2025	Best Director	Marcin Koszałka	Nominated	
Polish Film Awards	10 March 2025	Best Actor	Filip Pławiak	Won	
Polish Film Awards	10 March 2025	Best Actress	Sandra Drzymalska	Nominated	
Polish Film Awards	10 March 2025	Best Supporting Actor	Julian Świeżewski	Won	
Polish Film Awards	10 March 2025	Best Supporting Actor	Jakub Gierszał	Nominated	
Polish Film Awards	10 March 2025	Best Supporting Actress	Wiktoria Gorodeckaja	Nominated	
Polish Film Awards	10 March 2025	Best Screenplay	Łukasz M. Maciejewski and Marcin Koszałka	Nominated	
Polish Film Awards	10 March 2025	Best Cinematography	Marcin Koszałka	Nominated	
Polish Film Awards	10 March 2025	Best Production Design	Elwira Pluta	Nominated	
Polish Film Awards	10 March 2025	Best Makeup and Hairstyling	Dariusz Krysiak	Nominated	
Polish Film Awards	10 March 2025	Best Costume Design	Małgorzata Gwiazdecka and Joanna Pamuła	Nominated	
Polish Film Awards	10 March 2025	Best Film Score	Jacek Grudzień	Nominated	
Polish Film Awards	10 March 2025	Best Sound	Michał Fojcik, Tomasz Wieczorek, and Leszek Freund	Nominated	
Polish Film Awards	10 March 2025	Best Editing	Agnieszka Glińska	Nominated	
