= List of schools of higher education in Katowice =

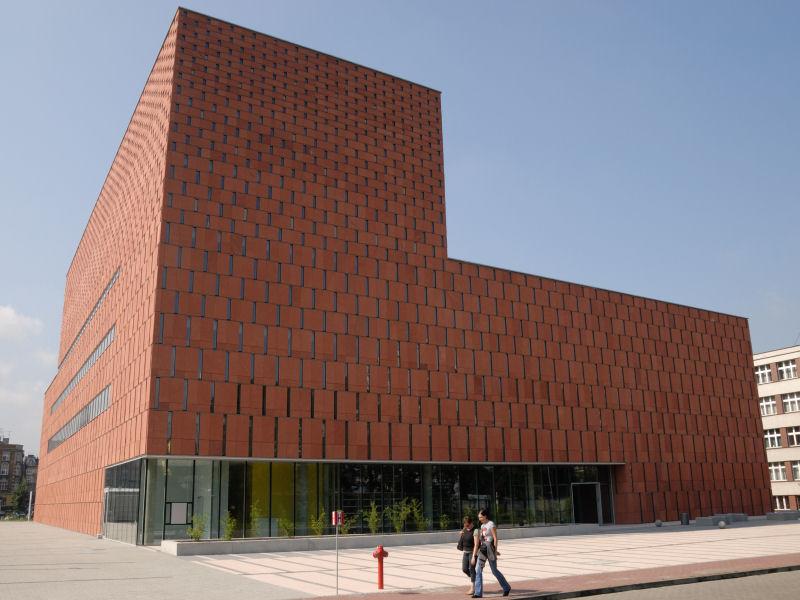
Scientific Information Centre and Academic Library

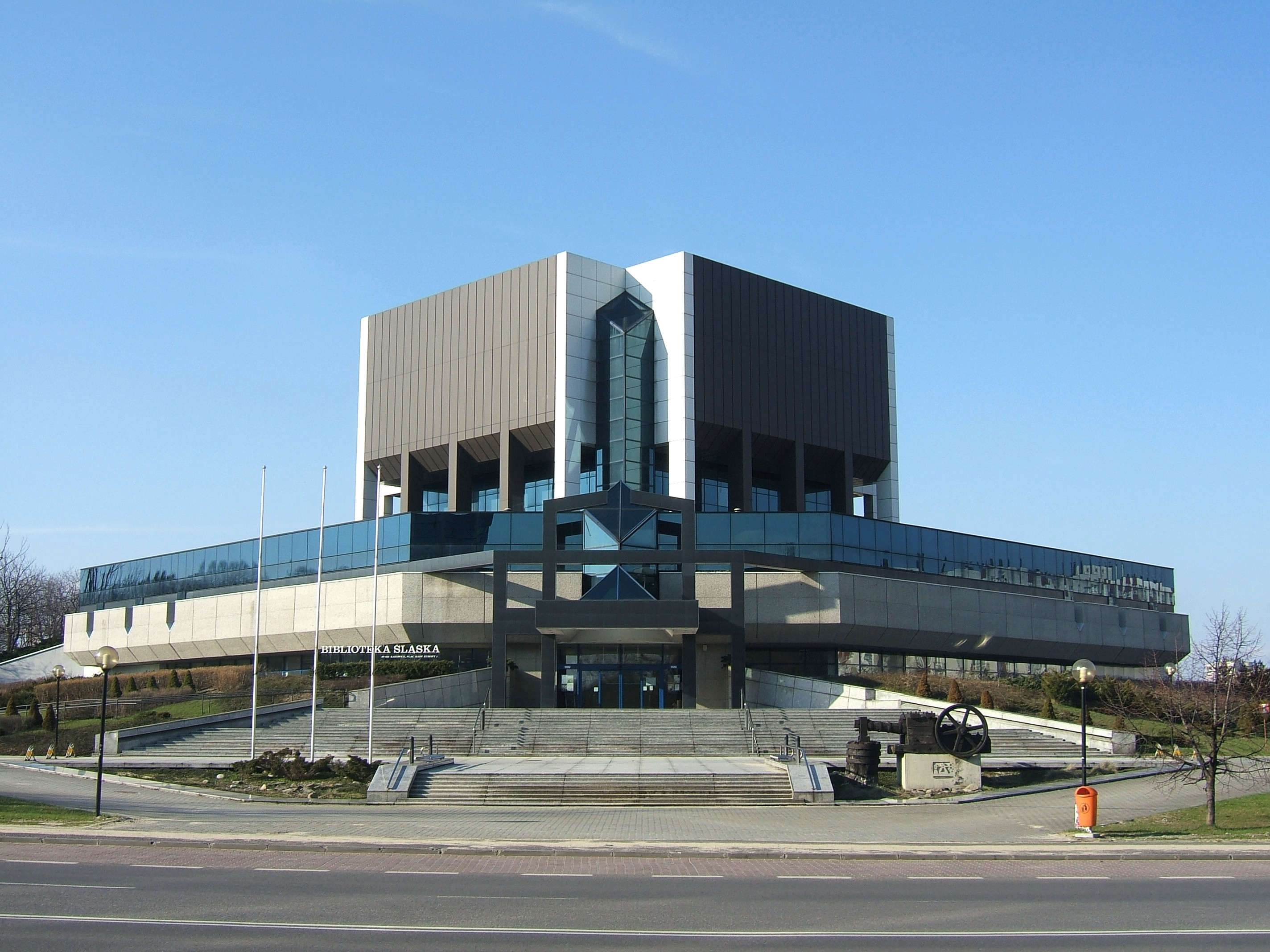
Silesian Library in Katowice

This is a list of schools of higher education in Katowice.

Katowice is a large scientific centre. It has over 20 schools of higher education, at which over 100,000 people study.

1. University of Silesia in Katowice
  - Krzysztof Kieślowski Faculty of Radio and Television, also named Katowice Film School or Krzysztof Kieślowski Film School in Katowice
2. University of Economics in Katowice
3. University of Music in Katowice
4. University of Sports in Katowice
5. Academy of Fine Arts in Katowice
6. Medical University of Silesia in Katowice
7. Silesian University of Technology - Faculty of Materials Science and Metallurgy and Transport
8. University of Social Sciences and Humanities - Faculty of Psychology
9. Polish Academy of Sciences
10. International Higher School of Political Sciences
11. International Higher School of Banking and Finances
12. Silesian International Business Higher School
13. Silesian Higher School of Computer Science
14. Silesian Higher School of Management
15. Uppersilesian Higher School of Trade
16. Higher School of Banking and Finances
17. Higher School of Humanistic Science
18. Higher School of Technical Science
19. Higher School of Computer Technologies
20. Higher School the Pedagogical TWP in Warsaw, the Institute of Pedagogy in Katowice
21. Higher School of Social Skills in Poznań (department in Katowice)
22. Higher School of Humanistic - Economic in Łódź (department in Katowice)
23. Higher School of Marketing Management and Foreign Languages
24. Higher School of Management the Protection of Work
25. Silesian Higher Clerical Seminary
26. Theological Seminar of Franciscans in Katowice-Panewniki
27. Private Teachers' College of Foreign Languages
28. Private Teachers' Board of Foreign Languages in Bielsko-Biała (department in Katowice)
29. WSB University (department in Katowice).
