= Colors of Evil: Red =

Mystery film directed by Adrian Panek

- Directed by: Adrian Panek
- Written by: Lukasz M. Maciejewski; Adrian Panek
- Based on: Colors of Evil: Red by Malgorzata Oliwia Sobczak
- Produced by: Leszek Bodzak; Aneta Cebula-Hickinbotham
- Starring: Jakub Gierszał; Maja Ostaszewska; Zofia Jastrzębska
- Cinematography: Tomasz Augustynek
- Edited by: Piotr Kmiecik
- Music by: Bartosz Chajdecki
- Production company: Aurum Film
- Distributed by: Netflix
- Release date: 29 May 2024
- Running time: 112 minutes
- Country: Poland
- Language: Polish

Colors of Evil: Red (Polish: Kolory zła. Czerwień) is a 2024 Polish mystery crime thriller film directed by Adrian Panek and based on the 2019 novel of the same name by Malgorzata Oliwia Sobczak. The film stars Jakub Gierszał, Maja Ostaszewska and Zofia Jastrzębska. It follows the murder of a young woman in Tricity, Poland and the rookie prosecutor Leopold Bilski who teams up with the victim's mother, Judge Helena Bogucka.

The film was released on 29 May 2024, by Netflix. The second in this series, Colors of Evil: Black (Polish: Kolory zła: Czerń), was released on Netflix on 10 June 2026.

== Plot ==
A young girl appears in the beach near Tricity, naked and with her lips torn away. She is soon identified as Monika Bogucka, the daughter of judge Helena Bogucka. Young Leopold Bilski, local public prosecutor, works to discover the identity of the murderer. The coroner discovers that this murder resembles one that took place a decade and a half before: the man that was condemned for said murder, Jakubiak, was let out of prison one week earlier. Jakubiak is arrested after a bloodied shirt is found in his backyard, but he commits suicide while Bilski interrogates him. Bilski's boss considers the matter settled, but Bilski believes there is more to it, and begins to investigate.

A few months before, Monika had gone to the "Dockyard", a disco owned by Kazar, a local mafioso. She gets a job there, and begins to get involved in the drug trade. Happenstance put her in contact with Kazar, who becomes interested in her - much to Monika's distress, as he not only quickly proves to be a vicious murderer, he rapes her. She attempted to report everything she had seen to the police, but the police officer she tried it with (one of the two Bilski is working with) turned out to be a dirty cop in Kazar's pay.

Meanwhile, Bogucka discovers that her husband is hiding something, and follows him one day: this lets her discover he's Kazar's attorney. She tries to learn more about what happened to her daughter, but when she goes to the "Dockyard", someone puts drugs in her drink. Thanks to a woman that works for Kazar but that sympathizes with her wish to learn what happened to Monika, she barely manages to escape.

Bilski's work puts him in contact with Tadeusz Dubiela, the coroner that investigated the murder Jakubiak was accused of, Bogucka's lover, and whose son Mario was friends with Monika. He also finds that several women related to the "Dockyard" have disappeared in similar circumstances as other women. He also manages to track down another of Kazar's subordinates, one that had been in a sexual relationship with Monika before Kazar got interested in her. He attempts to get him to surrender and collaborate, but when Bilski's police companions follow, the mafioso recognizes the dirty cop, who kills him.

Bogucka's husband gives her a pendrive with all the information he has on Kazar's dirty businesses: while he knows this will disbar him, he considers it a fair price for putting Kazar behind bars. Bogucka passes the information to Bilski, who quickly arranges a police sting to arrest Kazar. The sting manages to find several disturbing things, but no signs of what he could have done to the missing women. When the dirty cop offers to take Kazar to prison, Bilski orders the cop's partner to do so. Eventually, the dirty cop's dealings are discovered, and he dies when the police shows to arrest him.

Scientific police is unable to find proof of murders at Kazar's house, but Bilski realizes proof could be among Kazar's personal belongings when he was taken to jail: among them is a bracelet made of human lips - lips he cut off from his victims. Kazar admits to the murders, but not to Monika's.

With everything apparently done, Bilski and Bogucka split for personal time, him to meet his daughter and former wife in Warsaw, her to a weekend escape with Tadeusz. Tadeusz and Bogucka find his son Mario in the place they go to. Bliski realizes that, in his previous visit to the Dubiela's home, he saw Mario hiding a ruby ring that belonged to Monika - a ring Bogucka finds in Mario's room at the house she's at. Tadeusz knocks her unconscious and ties her at the basement, but she manages to escape, only to find Tadeusz with a shotgun.

Tadeusz explains that Mario had brought Monika to the same house, but he accidentally killed her while he tried to pressure her into having sex with him. He wanted to give himself up to the police, but Tadeusz instead decided to frame Jakubiak for the murder to keep his son out of prison. Just as Bilski arrives, Tadeusz commits suicide by shooting himself in the head with the shotgun. Mario soon gives himself up to the police.

== Cast ==
- Jakub Gierszał as Leopold Bilski
- Maja Ostaszewska as Helena Bogucka
- Zofia Jastrzębska as Monika Bogucka
- Andrzej Konopka as Tadeusz Dubiela
- Przemyslaw Bluszcz as Lukasz Kazarski 'Kazar'
- Wojciech Zielinski as Waldemar Mila
- Andrzej Zielinski as Roman Bogucki
- Jan Wieteska as Mario Dubiela

== Reception ==
Colors of Evil: Red received mixed-to-positive reviews from critics. On Rotten Tomatoes, it has a rating of 80% based on 5 reviews.

Film critic Johnny Loftus from Decider gave it a mixed review but praised Ostaszewska's performance writing: "Maja Ostaszewska deserves more screen time in Colors of Evil, but she makes the most of what she has, with a ton of mileage earned from a series of ever more drawn looks. The specifics of Helena’s dissolving marriage to Roman go unspoken, but the mistakes they made are written all over Ostaszewska’s features." Narayani M from The New Indian Express gave it a 2 out of 5 stars but also noted Ostaszewska's performance as the victim's mother. Jeffrey Speicher from the Collider also praised Ostaszewska's performance and film overall writing: "Colors of Evil: Red, the one performance that emerges as the most memorable is Maja Ostaszewska as an emotionally broken mother, Helena. From the heart-wrenching moment she has to identify her daughter at the morgue, she is so believable as a horribly traumatized parent going through the inner turmoil of losing her only child."
