= Infamy (TV series) =

Polish drama television series

- Polish: Infamia
- Genre: Drama; Teen drama
- Created by: Anna Maliszewska
- Written by: Dana Łukasińska; Julita Olszewska; Anna Maliszewska
- Directed by: Anna Maliszewska; Kuba Czekaj
- Starring: Zofia Jastrzębska; Sebastian Łach; Magdalena Czerwińska; Kamil Piotrowski
- Composers: Łukasz Targosz; Wojtek Urbański
- Country of origin: Poland
- Original languages: Polish; English
- No. of seasons: 1
- No. of episodes: 8

Production
- Cinematography: Wojciech Zieliński
- Running time: 44–52 minutes
- Production company: Watchout Studio

Original release
- Network: Netflix
- Release: 6 September 2023

Infamy (Polish: Infamia) is a Polish drama television series. It was released on Netflix on 6 September 2023.

== Premise ==
A 17-year-old Roma girl aspires to become a hip hop artist despite the strict rules of her family and community.

== Cast ==
- Zofia Jastrzębska as Gita Burano
- Sebastian Łach as Marko Burano
- Magdalena Czerwińska as Viola Burano
- Kamil Piotrowski as Tagar
- Artur Dziurman as Stefan Burano
- Wanda Ranii Kozłowska as Babka Tania
- Bożena Paczkowska as Ciotka Donka
- Sylwia Gola as Melisa Burano
- Konrad Bogusławski as Kevin Burano
- Tesla Schock as Lala Burano
- Manuel Dębicki as Roman
- Angelo Ciureja as Prince
- Branko Đurić as Josef
- Josef Fečo as Janko
- Aleksandra Grabowska as Eliza
- Agata Łabno as Wiśnia
- Julia Kuzka as Nadia
- Nicolas Przygoda as Kapuściński
- Jan Jakubik as Kamil
- Michał Wójtowicz as Mikołaj
- Julian Świeżewski as Ksiądz Kuba
- Diana Kadłubowska as Renata

== Episodes ==
| No. | Title | Duration | Original release date |
|---|---|---|---|
| 1 | "Episode 1" | 45 min | 6 September 2023 |
| 2 | "Episode 2" | 44 min | 6 September 2023 |
| 3 | "Episode 3" | 47 min | 6 September 2023 |
| 4 | "Episode 4" | 48 min | 6 September 2023 |
| 5 | "Episode 5" | 45 min | 6 September 2023 |
| 6 | "Episode 6" | 48 min | 6 September 2023 |
| 7 | "Episode 7" | 47 min | 6 September 2023 |
| 8 | "Episode 8" | 52 min | 6 September 2023 |

== Production ==
The series was filmed in Nowa Ruda, Wałbrzych, and a Roma village in Maszkowice.

== Reception ==
Regarding the pilot episode, Joel Keller of Decider wrote that "Infamy gets off to a good start, setting up a strong story about a modern teenager who is thrust into a family with traditions she finds repulsive" and called Zofia Jastrzębska's performance "strong".
