= Zofia Jastrzębska =

Polish actress (born 1998)

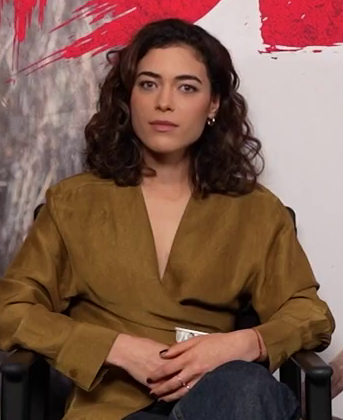
- Jastrzębska in 2025
- Born: 7 December 1998 (age 27); Kraków, Poland
- Occupation: Actress

Zofia Jastrzębska (born 7 December 1998) is a Polish stage, film and television actress.

== Life and career ==
Born in Kraków, Jastrzębska studied at the AST National Academy of Theatre Arts, from which she graduated in 2022. She made her professional debut in the TV-series Zameldowani, before appearing in a number of other series, notably playing Jagna Galecka in the series For Better or Worse.

Jastrzębska had her breakout in 2023, playing the leading role in the Netflix series Infamy. In 2024, she starred in the Netflix film Colors of Evil: Red.

=== Personal life ===
Jastrzębska describes herself as a feminist.
