= Polish Academy Award for Best Costume Design =

Annual Polish film award

The Polish Academy Award for Best Costume Design is an annual award given to the best Polish costume design of the year.

== Winners and nominees ==
Year	Movie title	Designer(s)
2001	Wrota Europy	Magdalena Tesławska Paweł Grabarczyk
2001	Chłopaki nie płaczą	Dorota Roqueplo
2001	Daleko od okna	Małgorzata Zacharska
2001	Duże zwierzę	Elżbieta Radke
2001	Prymas - trzy lata z tysiąca	Ewa Krauze
2001	Syzyfowe prace	Maria Wiłun
2001	Zakochani	Paweł Grabarczyk
2001	Życie jako śmiertelna choroba przenoszona drogą płciową	Jagna Janicka
2002	Quo Vadis	Magdalena Tesławska Paweł Grabarczyk
2002	Boże skrawki	Jagna Janicka
2002	Pół serio	Jan Kozikowski
2002	Przedwiośnie	Małgorzata Braszka
2002	Wiedźmin	Małgorzata Stefaniak
2003	Pianista	Anna Biedrzycka-Sheppard
2003	Chopin. Pragnienie miłości	Magdalena Tesławska Paweł Grabarczyk
2003	Dzień świra	Ewa Krauze
2003	Kariera Nikosia Dyzmy	Małgorzata Braszka
2003	Zemsta	Krystyna Zachwatowicz Magdalena Biedrzycka
2004	Stara baśń - kiedy słońce było bogiem	Magdalena Tesławska Paweł Grabarczyk
2004	Nienasycenie	Daiva Petrulyte
2004	Pornografia	Małgorzata Zacharska
2005	Ubu Król	Magdalena Biedrzycka
2005	Mój Nikifor	Dorota Roqueplo
2005	Wesele	Magdalena Maciejewska
2006	Skazany na bluesa	Ewa Krauze
2006	Persona non grata	Jagna Janicka
2006	PitBull	Justyna Stolarz
2007	Jasminum	Ewa Helman
2007	Kochankowie roku tygrysa	Andrzej Szejnach
2007	Kochankowie z Marony	Magdalena Biedrzycka
2007	Oda do radości	Magdalena Biedrzycka
2007	S@motność w sieci	Ewa Machulska
2007	Statyści	Paweł Grabarczyk
2007	Tylko mnie kochaj	Elżbieta Radke
2007	Wszyscy jesteśmy Chrystusami	Justyna Stolarz Magdalena Biedrzycka
2008	Katyń	Magdalena Biedrzycka
2008	Nightwatching	Jagna Janicka Marrit van der Burgt
2008	Strajk	Ewa Krauze
2009	Mała Moskwa	Małgorzata Zacharska
2009	Boisko bezdomych	Katarzyna Lewińska Magdalena Jadwiga Rutkiewicz-Luterek
2009	Rysa	Jagna Janicka
2010	Rewers	Magdalena Biedrzycka
2010	Janosik. Prawdziwa historia	Anita Hroššová Magdalena Tesławska
2010	Miasto z morza	Jagna Janicka
2011	Wenecja	Małgorzata Zacharska
2011	Joanna	Magdalena Biedrzycka
2011	Śluby panieńskie	Małgorzata Braszka
2012	Młyn i krzyż	Dorota Roqueplo
2012	Daas	Barbara Sikorska-Bouffał
2012	W ciemności	Katarzyna Lewińska Jagna Janicka
2013	Obława	Magdalena Rutkiewicz-Luterek
2013	Jesteś Bogiem	Agata Culak
2013	Pokłosie	Małgorzata Braszka
2014	Papusza	Barbara Sikorska-Bouffał
2014	Ida	Aleksandra Staszko
2014	Wałęsa. Człowiek z nadziei	Magdalena Biedrzycka
2015	Miasto 44	Magdalena Rutkiewicz-Luterek; Dorota Roqueplo
2015	Bogowie	Ewa Gronowska
2015	Jack Strong	Michał Koralewski Małgorzata Braszka
2016	Hiszpanka	Dorota Roqueplo Andrzej Szejnach
2016	Czerwony pająk	Magdalena Biedrzycka
2016	Panie Dulskie	Małgorzata Zacharaska
2017	Marie Curie: The Courage of Knowledge	Cristobal Pidre Florence Scholtes; Małgorzata Zacharska
2017	Powidoki	Katarzyna Lewińska
2017	Sztuka kochania	Ewa Gronowska
