= OKO.press =

Polish investigative journalism website

- Website type: Fact-checking
- Available in: Polish
- Founded: 15 June 2016; 10 years ago
- Country of origin: Poland
- Owner: Fundacja Ośrodek Kontroli Obywatelskiej OKO
- Editors: Piotr Pacewicz; Bianka Mikołajewska
- Key people: Agata Szczęśniak; Adam Leszczyński
- Website: oko.press

OKO.press is a Polish investigative journalism website created on 15 June 2016. The name is a word play on oko, Polish for eye, and an abbreviation for "Ośrodek Kontroli Obywatelskiej" (Centre for Civic Control).

OKO.press is funded by a mix of individual donations and grants, with no revenue from advertising. The site aims to promote democratic values, human rights and transparency of government by publishing fact-finding, research and analysis.

In 2020, the website received the Index on Censorship journalism award.

== Creation ==
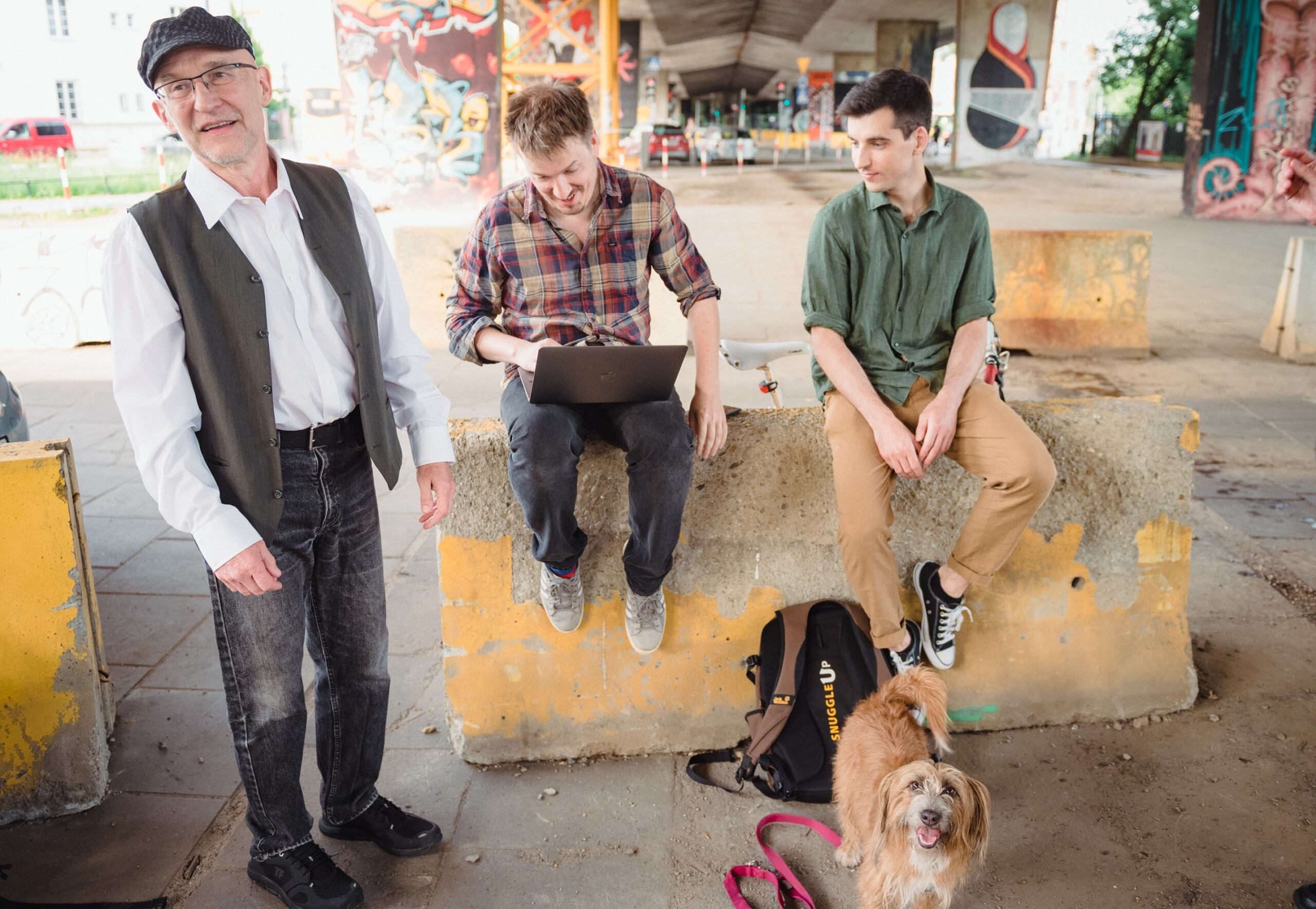
Piotr Pacewicz, Bartosz Kocejko and Daniel Flis of OKO.press

OKO.press was founded in June 2016, through the Fundacja Ośrodek Kontroli Obywatelskiej "OKO" editors originating from the Polish media company Agora, as a non-profit investigative journalism website, with initial funding provided in form of grants by Stefan Batory Foundation. The founding chief editor was Piotr Pacewicz, former deputy chief editor of Gazeta Wyborcza and the founding deputy chief editor Bianka Mikołajewska, formerly of Gazeta Wyborcza and Polityka. OKO.press journalists initially included journalists from Gazeta Wyborcza, Polityka, TVN, and from the Agora regional news station Tok FM. The website is financed through individual donations and grants. In 2019, its income consisted of 80% individual donations and 20% grants. 93% of the readers are from Poland, the rest are mainly from Germany, Great Britain and the United States.

== Editorial line ==
OKO.press describes its aims as investigative journalism, fact-checking of public debate, and stimulating discussion of important themes in the Internet. It states that it promotes democratic values, human rights and government transparency. OKO.press says that it follows twelve fact-checking principles modelled on the United States project PolitiFact. According to Jarosław Kurski, OKO.press was created in the context of a government that was successively removing checks and balances that protected citizens' rights and state institutions from government oppression, and it was intended to be independent of political parties and independent of the Committee for the Defence of Democracy.

OKO.Press has debunked far-right conspiracy theories on Islam in Europe. Academic historian and OKO.press commentator Adam Leszczyński debunked far-right politician Robert Winnicki's comments on Islamic colonisation in 2016. In 2017, deputy editor Bianka Mikołajewska fact-checked a right-wing commentator Tomasz Łysiak's statements that the national independence march did not have tens of thousands of far-right extremists and fascists marching. On review of photographic evidence, Mikołajewska debunked Łysiak's statement, showing significant prevalence of far-right slogans and symbols such as the Nazi flag, Polish eagle, and celtic cross. These two instances of debunking far-right propaganda on Islam exhibits an association with peace journalism.

In 2019, OKO.press was included in the "Duke University Reporters' Lab" list of Polish fact-checker media, along with Demagog. In 2020, it was ranked as the seventh most authoritative Polish web portal.

Ground News categorises OKO.press as left-wing.

== Notable coverage ==
The European Journalism Centre (EJC) described OKO.press coverage of the COVID-19 pandemic as providing daily coverage on infection statistics and in reporting on constitutional restrictions, workers' rights, and a leaked government proposal to introduce a 60-hour working week and providing "fact check articles debunking false statements by top Polish politicians". EJC described the COVID-19 coverage as playing a role in extending OKO.press's audience.

== International response ==
OKO.press has an international reputation as an "acclaimed", "well-known investigative journalism outlet".

== Lawsuits ==
Between 2018 and 2020 seven vexatious lawsuits by politicians, companies, and business people were filed against OKO.press. In reaction to the 2 April 2020 publication of the article It is better to avoid the museum. What Minister Gliński did with the memory of the Second World War (Polish: Muzeum lepiej omijać szerokim łukiem. Co Minister Gliński zrobił z pamięcią o II wojnie światowej), a lawsuit was filed against OKO.press. The founder and editor-in-chief of OKO.press, Piotr Pacewicz, described the lawsuit as an attack on the freedom of the press and media.

Any attempts at interfering in media in lawsuits aim at having a chilling effect. This involves more than settling a specific dispute. It sends a message: "Beware, you can't do all that you want". Numerous analyses of populist systems emphasise that control over the media is key for populists. Because populists' governance model is based on the highly selective distribution of truth and circulation of many false or manipulated messages. Independent media, which uncovers such lies and manipulations, are all the more dangerous for populists and their grip on power.

— Piotr Pacewicz, statement to ECPMF, Nov 2020

In 2019, OKO.press lost a lawsuit filed by Kaja Godek in relation to an article published in OKO.press by Klementyna Suchanow. In the article, Suchanow alleged that Godek was known for a photo showing her with friends performing a Nazi salute. The court ruling required the allegation to be removed from the article.

== Awards ==
In December 2016, the deputy chief editor of OKO.press, Bianka Mikołajewska, was awarded the 2016 Grand Press award for "courage in facing new challenges and journalistic accuracy" and "good, hard journalistic work in sticking to the facts ... rather than repeating their interpretation".

In early 2020, OKO.press was shortlisted for the Index on Censorship Freedom of Expression Awards, along with Hong Kong Free Press, SOS Médias Burundi and Venezuelan journalist Marco Ruiz Silvera. On 16 April 2020, Index on Censorship named OKO.press as the winner, justifying its choice for OKO.press being "one of the first free investigative journalism and fact-checking websites in Poland", for its journalistic work "[paving] the way for other news sources to follow suit", "fighting for immunity from government propaganda", and being "crucial in an environment sliding further and further into authoritarianism and censorship".

In September 2020, OKO.press received the Equality Crowns media award from Campaign Against Homophobia for "analyzing the events concerning the LGBT community in Poland carefully and with dedication".
