= Piotr Pacewicz =

Polish journalist (born 1953))

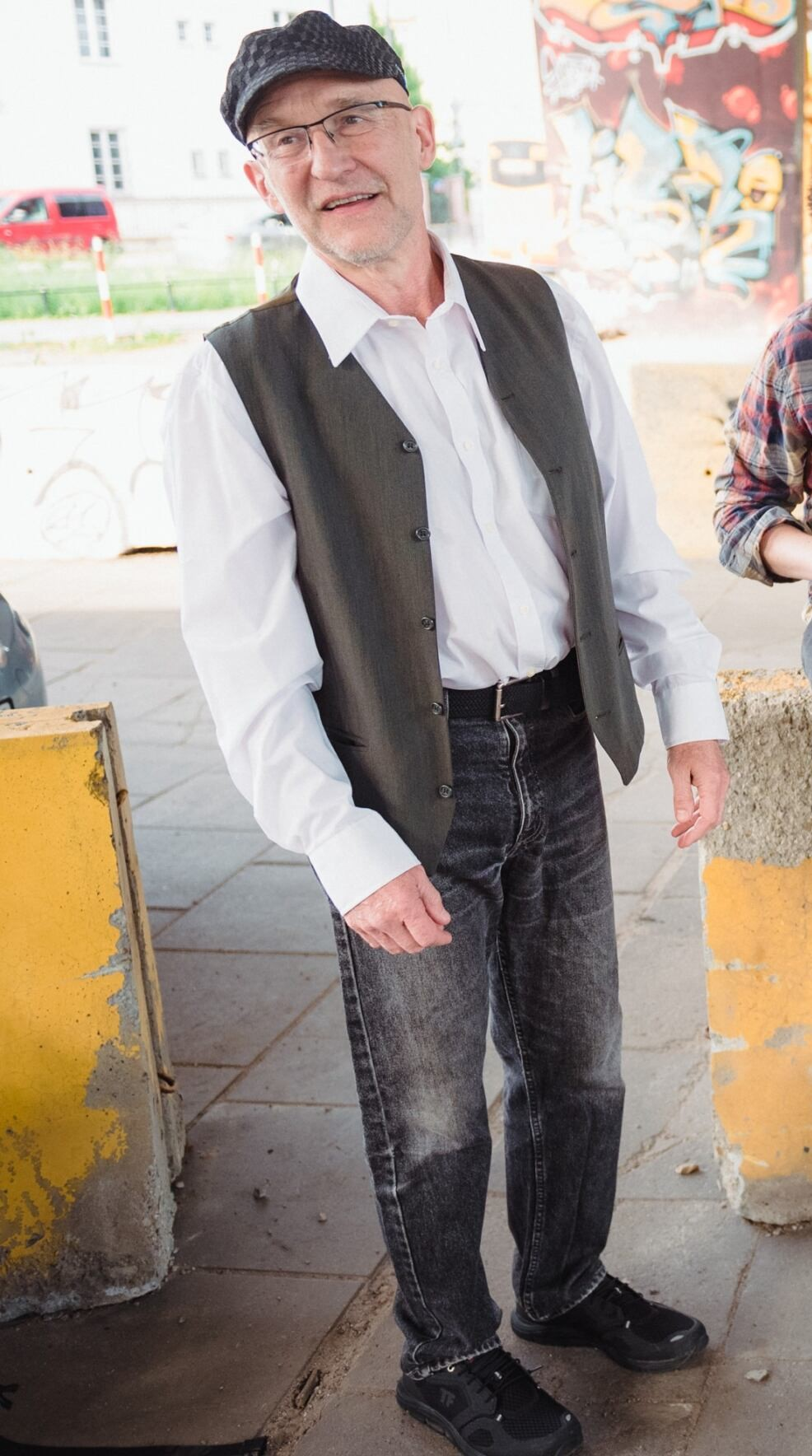
- Pacewicz in 2011
- Born: 1 January 1953 (age 73); Warsaw, Poland
- Occupation: Journalist

Piotr Pacewicz (born 1 January 1953) is a Polish journalist.

== Biography ==
He graduated from the Faculty of Psychology at the University of Warsaw. He used pseudonymus: Fel, Felek, Feliks Felicki, FF. He lectured on social psychology at the Technical University in West Berlin. From 1980 to 1989, he was an assistant professor at the Institute of Psychology of the Polish Academy of Sciences.

From 1982 to 1989 he was the editor of Tygodnik Mazowsze, in which he was also an archivist and author. In 1989 he took part in the Round Table talks on the side of the opposition; he served as secretary to the political roundtable led by Bronisław Geremek. Also in 1989 he was among founders of Gazeta Wyborcza. There, from 1995 to 2010 he was deputy editor-in-chief.

He has co-written the screenplay for a 2004 TV series Czwarta władza. In 2016 he co-founded OKO.press, and from 2016 to 2024 was its editor-in-chief.

His hobby is sports. At the website of Archiwum Osiatyńskiego, he was described as feminist and ally of LGBT. He is the father of Mateusz Pacewicz and Krzysztof Pacewicz.

== Books ==
- Pomiędzy myślą a rzeczywistością. Psychologiczna analiza rewolucji społecznej (1983)
- Pociąg osobowy. Rozmowy Piotra Pacewicza (2010)
- Zakazane miłości. Seksualność i inne tabu (2010; co-authored with Marta Konarzewska)

== Awards ==
- Hiacynt awarded by Fundacja Równości (2008)
- Knight's Cross of the Order of Polonia Restituta (2011)
