= Flesh and Fuel =

2026 drama film by Pierre Le Gall

- French: Du Fioul dans les artères
- Literally: Fuel in the Arteries
- Directed by: Pierre Le Gall
- Written by: Pierre Le Gall; Camille Perton
- Produced by: Nicolas Blanc
- Starring: Alexis Manenti; Julian Świeżewski
- Cinematography: Antoine Cormier
- Edited by: Xavier Sirven
- Music by: Paul Sabin
- Production company: Ex Nihilo
- Distributed by: Pan Distribution
- Release date: 16 May 2026 (Cannes)
- Running time: 90 minutes
- Countries: France; Poland
- Languages: French; English; Polish

Flesh and Fuel (French: Du Fioul dans les artères, lit. "Fuel in the Arteries") is a 2026 drama film directed by Pierre Le Gall (in his feature film debut), co-written with Camille Perton. It stars Alexis Manenti as Étienne, a gay French truck driver who meets Polish trucker Bartosz (Julian Świeżewski) on the road, with the two men quickly drawn into a romance complicated by the demands of their jobs.

The film had its world premiere at the Critics' Week section of the 2026 Cannes Film Festival on 16 May, where it won the Queer Palm Revelation prize and was nominated for the Caméra d'Or.

== Cast ==
- Alexis Manenti as Étienne
- Julian Świeżewski as Bartosz
- Mohamed Makhtoumi
- Oudesh Rughooputh
- Armindo Alves de Sa
- François Félicité

== Production ==
According to Le Gall, the film was originally inspired by the COVID-19 pandemic, and the way trucking industry workers continued to do their jobs despite their isolation from friends and family. He additionally stated that he was interested in trucking in that it was one of the last working-class industries in France that still carries a social culture of being passed down from generation to generation as an "inheritance" rather than a personal choice.

== Release ==
The film premiered in the Critics' Week program at the 2026 Cannes Film Festival on 16 May 2026, where it won the Queer Palm Revelation prize and was nominated for the Caméra d'Or..

== Reception ==
Writing for The Hollywood Reporter, Jordan Mintzer contrasted the film against the 2025 Mexican film On the Road (En el camino), which had a more violent take on a similar premise. He wrote that "In dramas such as this — both David Lean's Brief Encounter and Ang Lee's clearly influential Brokeback Mountain come to mind — the would-be couples typically don't stay together and usually one of them, or else love itself, winds up dying. Without giving away how Flesh and Fuel ends, it's worth commending Le Gall for choosing a different route. The fact that he sees some hope in Étienne's and Bartosz's future is not only a sign of his romanticism. It's a testament to his belief that those who toil away at unforgiving jobs deserve their fair share of happiness, if they can just take the right exit ramp."

For Cineuropa, Fabien Lemercier wrote that "the film displays great sensitivity in its on-the-ground (and on-the-move) exploration of loneliness. This feeling of loneliness is further enhanced by Alexis Manenti’s performance and by the fine work of cinematographer Antoine Cormier (who realistically captures this world of grey and concrete) and Paul Sabin’s music score. This excellent story (written by the director with Camille Perton and Martin Drouot), alternating between the raw and the tender, the rough-edged and the subtle emotional moments, the withdrawn individualism and the solidarity born of passing on values, also knows how to bounce back effectively (in a more traditional vein of the quest for paradise lost). For sometimes we must move beyond our own mental boundaries, question ourselves and break free from our protective routines in order to truly discover ourselves, to love and to be loved."

Andrew Pankey of The Queer Review likened the film to a cross between God's Own Country and Weekend, writing that "Manenti gives a subtle yet powerful performance, imbuing Etienne with a mysterious quality. A tenderness emerges in a glance or a touch, allowing us a glimpse beneath his protective outer shell. Świeżewski’s Bartosz is charming and funny, providing a wonderful foil to Etienne’s more closed-off exterior. As the sparks fly, the chemistry between these two left me grinning throughout."

For Têtu, Florian Ques noted the distinctiveness of a gay romance film where the main challenge was neither internalized self-loathing nor a homophobic villain, but simply the isolating and itinerant nature of the characters' employment circumstances.
