= Krzysztof Stroiński =

Polish actor

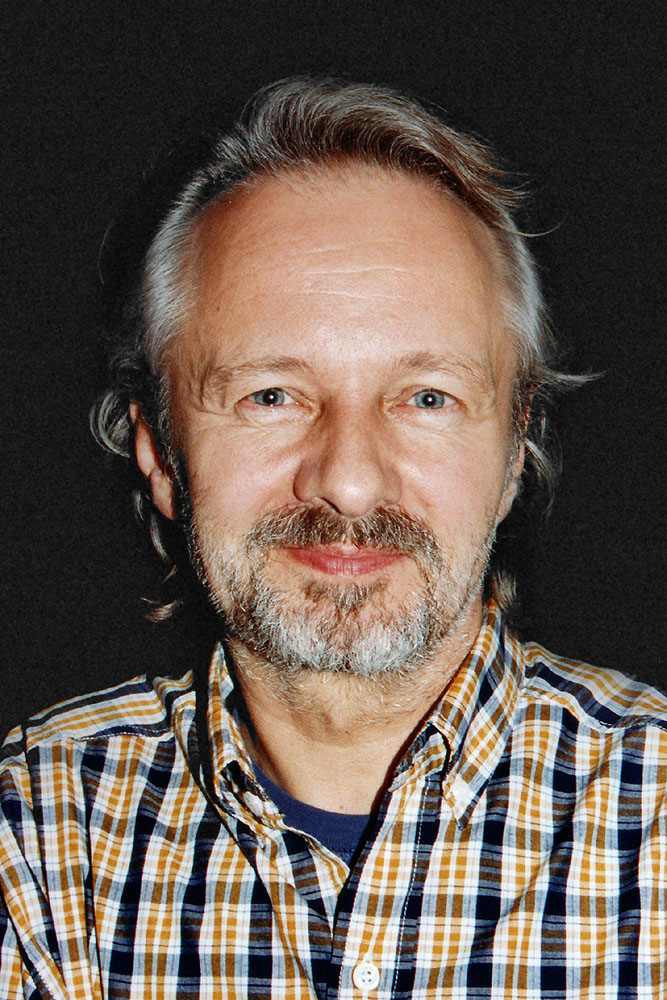
Krzysztof Stroiński

Krzysztof Stroiński (born 9 October 1950 in Pszczyna) is a Polish actor. He performed in more than forty films since 1971. He won the 2009 Polish Academy Award for Best Actor for his performance in Scratch.

== Selected filmography ==
Film
Year	Title	Role	Notes
2011	80 Million		
2008	Scratch		
2007	Louise's Garden		
2005	Pitbull		
1999	A Week in the Life of a Man		
1997	Love Stories		
1995	Holy Week		
1989	300 Miles to Heaven		

TV
Year	Title	Role	Notes
2007	Ekipa		
1980	Archiv des Todes		
