= Filip Pławiak =

Polish actor (born 1989)

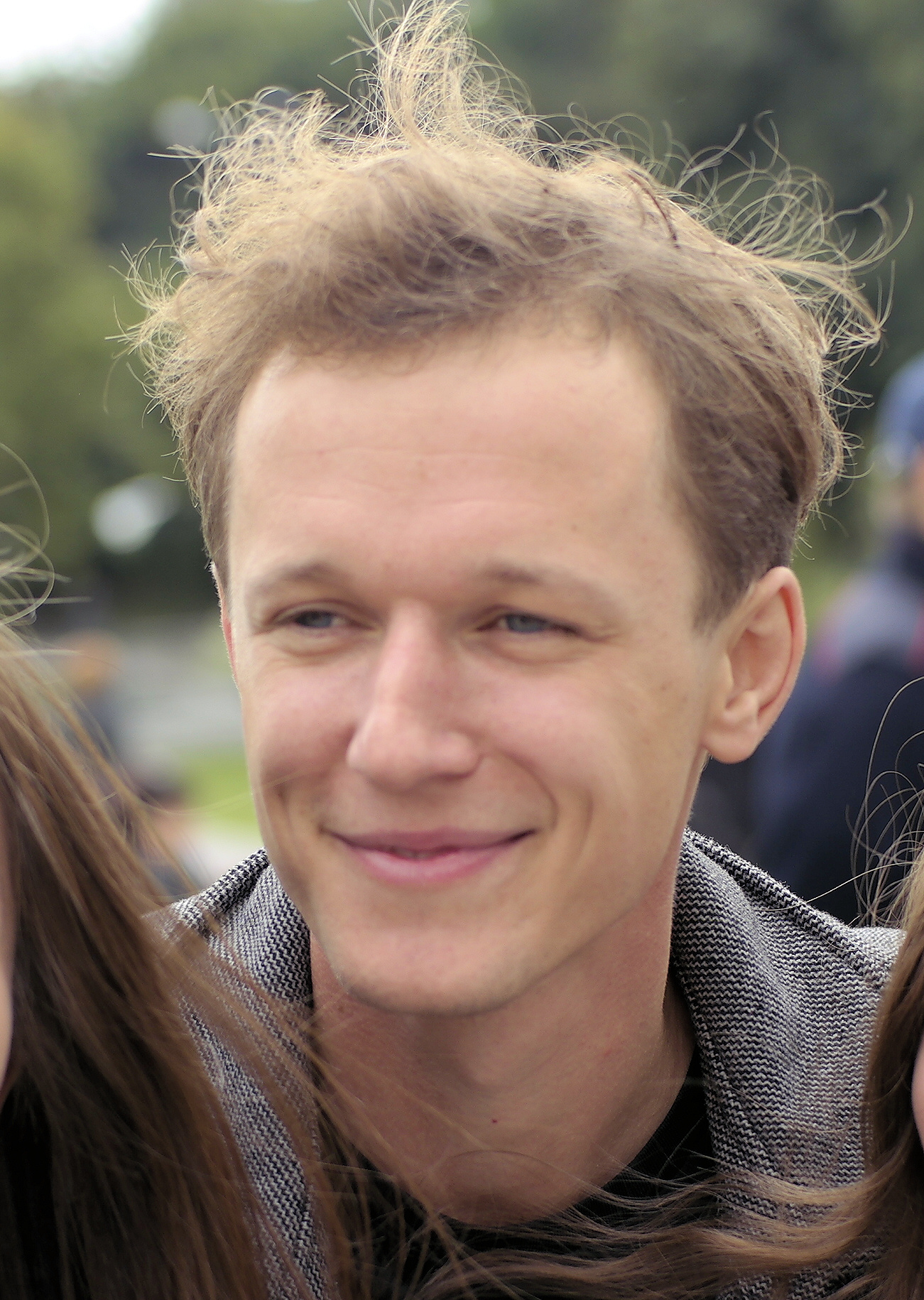
- Filip Pławiak, 2016
- Born: 26 September 1989 (age 36); Nowy Sącz
- Citizenship: Polish
- Occupation: Actor
- Years active: 2010–

Filip Pławiak (born 26 September 1989) is a Polish actor.

== Filmography ==
- 2010: Wenecja (film) a young monk
- 2011: Pokaż, kotku, co masz w środku as Jacek Paluch
- 2012: Aftermath as Highlander Constable
- 2013: Bilet na Księżyc as Adam Sikora
- 2014: Stones for the Rampart as Zygmunt Kaczyński „Wesoły”
- 2014: Father Matthew as Jarek (episode 154)
- 2015: The Red Spider Karol Kremer
- 2016: Prosta historia o morderstwie as Jacek Lach, young policeman
- 2016: Volhynia as captain Zygmunt Krzemieniecki
- 2017: Letters to Santa 3 as Rafał
- 2017: Bikini Blue as Rajmund Lekki, hospital's patient
- 2018: Hurricane as Mirosław Ferić
- 2018: The Defence as Kordian "Zordon" Oryński
- 2018: 1983 as Cyprian
- 2022: Below The Surface as second lieutenant Jerzy Sosnowski
- 2024: White Courage as Jędrek Zawrat
- 2024: The Mire (Millenium) as a hotel manager in his youth
- 2026: The Doll as Julian Ochocki

Source.

== Accolades ==
In 2025 he received Polish Film Award for Best Actor for the film White Courage.
