= Jan Komasa =

Polish filmmaker

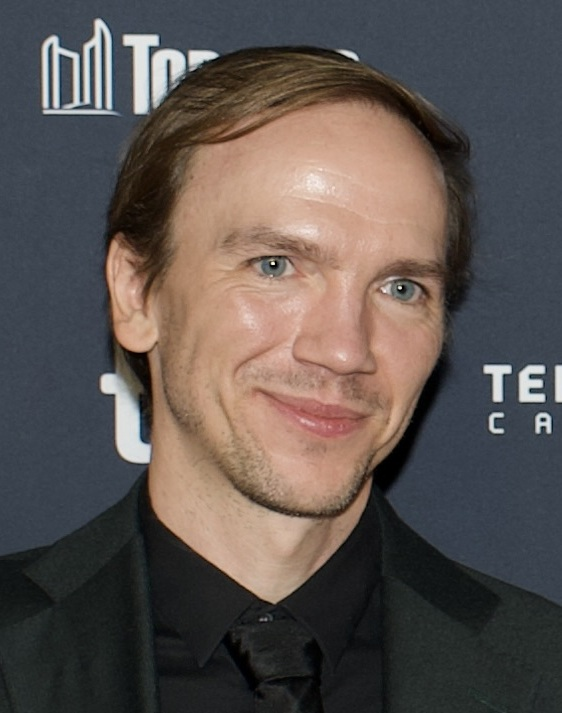
- Komasa in 2025
- Born: 1981 (age 44–45); Poznań, Poland
- Education: National Film School in Łódź
- Occupation: Filmmaker
- Spouse: Kinga Komasa
- Children: Maja Komasa and Jakub Komasa
- Parents: Wiesław Komasa (father); Gina Komasa (mother)

Jan Tadeusz Komasa (born 1981) is a Polish filmmaker. He is best known for directing Suicide Room (2011), Warsaw 44 (2014), and Corpus Christi (2019), which was nominated for the Best International Feature Film at the 92nd Academy Awards. His previous works premiered and won awards at Tribeca Film Festival, Berlin Film Festival, Cannes, and Venice.

== Early life and education ==
Jan Komasa was born in 1981 in Poznań, Poland. His father, Wiesław Komasa, is a theatre actor and professor at National Academy of Dramatic Art in Warsaw. His mother is a singer and music producer who worked for a television channel. His brother is a bass-baritone singer, Szymon Komasa. His sister Mary Komasa is a musician.

Komasa was raised in Warsaw, where his family moved in 1988.

He graduated from National Film School in Łódź.

== Career ==
He was 21 when he directed his short film Nice To See You (2003) which won 3rd prize at Cannes Film Festival (Cinefondation) and was presented on several film festivals including Munich Film Festival, São Paulo International Film Festival and Cork Film Festival.

He was 23 when he directed a part of a triptych feature film Ode to Joy (2005) which premiered in main competition at Rotterdam Film Festival(2006) and won numerous awards including (second in importance) Special Jury Prize at Gdynia Film Festival (2005). Ode to Joy was present ed at over 30 festivals including Chicago International Film Festival, Karlovy Vary Film Festival, Jerusalem Film Festival, Moscow International Film Festival, Palić Film Festival, Cottbus Film Festival, Valencia Cinema Jove Festival and more.

In the upcoming years he focused on directing music videos, commercials with the exception of full-length documentary film The Flow (2007) which premiered at Kraków Film Festival and television film Wroclaw's Golgotha (2008) which won lead actor's award at Monte-Carlo Television Festival along with Grand Prix and 5 other awards at Polish Radio and Television Dramatic Art "Two Theatres" Festival.

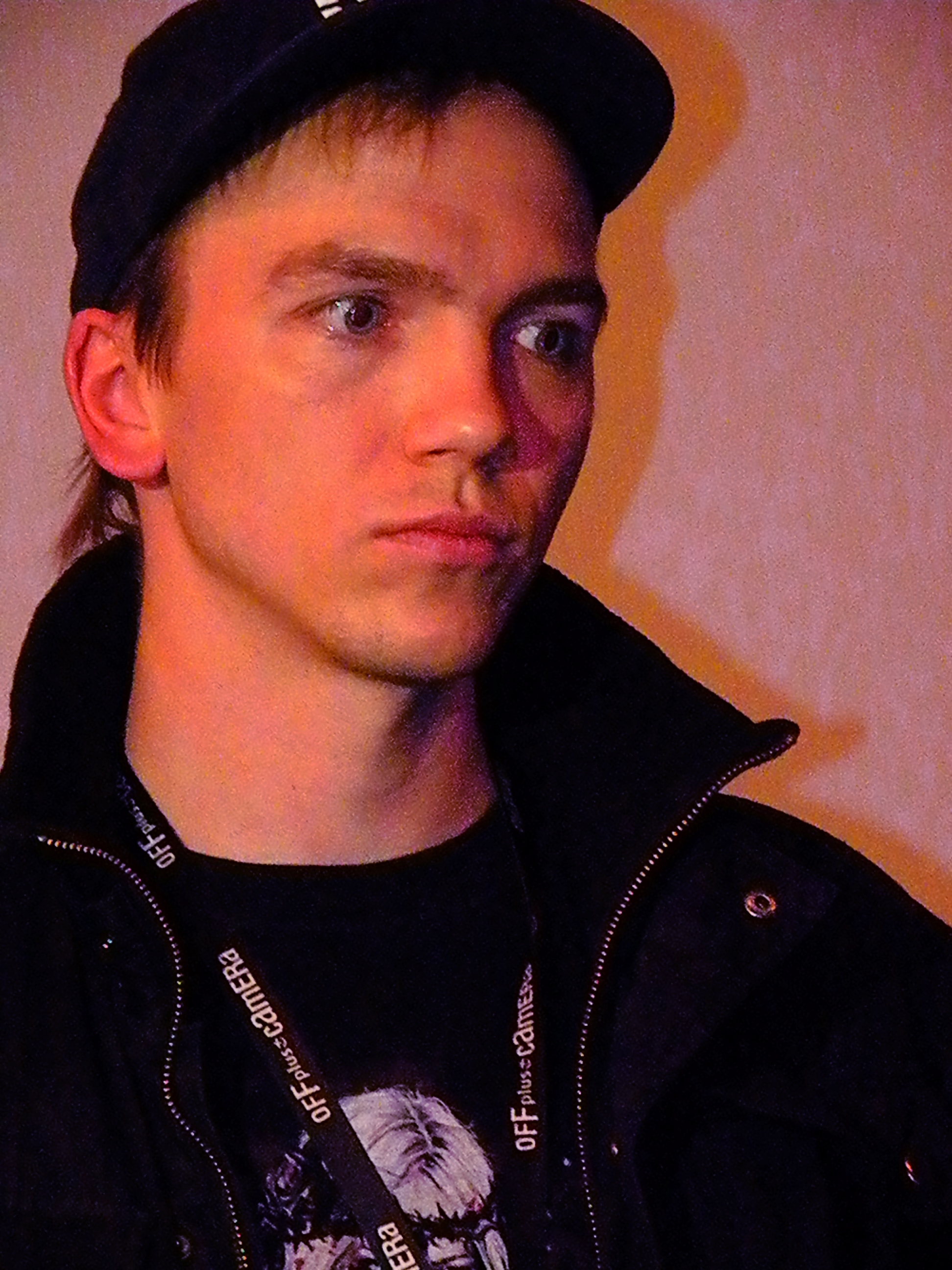
Komasa in 2011

He wrote his first feature film Suicide Room script in 2008, directed the film in 2009 and premiered it at Berlin Film Festival in 2011. Film generated a big buzz afterwards which ultimately led to a sweeping box office success (with 900,000 admissions in Polish cinemas - $4,878,284 and $2,348,656 abroad). Komasa was awarded with Polish Film Award for Discovery of the Year and Best Editing along with FIPRESCI at International Festival of Independent Cinema Off Camera, Best Film and best score award at Giffoni Film Festival, Silver Lion at Gdynia Film Festival, Best Polish Film award at MTV Movie & TV Awards, Best Film at Stockholm International Film Festival, best film at Geneva International Film Festival, Best Debut Film at New Horizons Film Festival and many other awards. Leading actor Jakub Gierszał was awarded with Shooting Stars Award for his portrayal of Dominik Santorski, Suicide Room's main character. Suicide Room was distributed by Wolfe Video, the oldest and largest exclusive distributor of LGBT films in North America.

He created a concept of a unique full-length documentary he directed - Warsaw Uprising (2014) which was a critical and box office success with 700,000 viewers in Polish cinemas. The film received very good reviews from Los Angeles Times ("Warsaw Uprising" is not only a unique, remarkably assembled documentary-narrative hybrid but also a powerful look at the personal and public devastation that can occur during wartime. Movies rarely feel as authentic as this") to Village Voice (Despite its context in a global conflict, "Uprising" is a strangely intimate film.) to Times of Israel (...a mesmerizing account of the fierce house-to-house fighting against the German.) Warsaw Uprising was awarded with Golden Reel Award 2015 for Best Documentary and Polish Film Award for Best Documentary and Best Sound Design.

His biggest box office success came with a blockbuster he wrote and directed - an epic period film Warsaw 44 (2014). He wrote the script in January 2006 and the film took 8 years to produce. Warsaw 44 depicts a tragic story of young people fighting in Warsaw Uprising. The film premiered at Busan Film Festival, won Golden Lions for Best Actress, Best Sound, Best Special Effects at Gdynia Film Festival, received Polish Film Awards for Discovery of the Year, Best Production Design, Best Costume Design, Best Film award at China Golden Rooster & Hundred Flowers FF and was followed by 1.800.000 admissions to Polish cinemas and a worldwide distribution.

In 2015 he directed second season of crime series Blood Of The Blood, a format based on Dutch series Penose starring Agata Kulesza.

2016 was a year in which Komasa switched from film set to a theater stage to create an epic contemporary dance multimedia show Ksenophony at Malta Festival Poznań to commemorate 60th anniversary of his hometown's Poznań protests of 1956.

In 2017 he started a collaboration with Primetime Emmy Award and Writers Guild of America Awards nominee scriptwriter Wendy West and producer Barry Josepshon and formatted and directed an AXN / Netflix cyber-crime series Ultraviolet.

In 2018 he directed Corpus Christi which premiered in 2019 at Venice Film Festival where it won two awards: Europa Cinemas Label Award and Edipo Re Inclusion Award. At Gdynia Film Festival Komasa was awarded with 10 awards including Best Director Award and the film won awards for Best Screenplay, Best Supporting Actress, Audience Award, Journalist Award, Elle Rising Star for Main Actor Bartosz Bielenia. It was awarded with Silver Star and Best Actor Award at El Gouna Film Festival. For his performance Bartosz Bielenia won awards at numerous festivals including: Palm Springs International Film Festival, Chicago Film Festival, Stockholm Film Festival, Bordeaux Film Festival, Zbigniew Cybulski Award, Shooting Stars Award. Corpus Christi was nominated for the Best International Feature Film at the 92nd Academy Awards.

His film The Hater (2020) became one of the first movies disrupted by COVID-19 outbreak premiering on 6 March 2020 in Poland before the cinemas in the country were closed down 6 days later due to partial national lockdown administered by the Polish government. To mitigate inevitable losses and take advantage of still ongoing advertising campaign The Hater began being distributed on VOD platforms domestically on 18 March. The Hater was selected to International Main Competition at 2020 Tribeca Film Festival, which ultimately went online due to the outbreak of COVID-19. The film won Best International Narrative Feature award and its world rights were acquired by Netflix.

Komasa directed two films that were released in 2025: Good Boy, which premiered at the 2025 Toronto International Film Festival, and Anniversary.

In 2026, Komasa was appointed the jury president of the Progressive Cinema Competition at the 21st Rome Film Festival.

== Filmography ==
=== Feature film ===
- Ode to Joy segment "Warsaw" (2005)
- The Flow documentary (2007)
- Suicide Room (2011)
- Warsaw Uprising documentary (2014)
- Warsaw 44 (Miasto 44) (2014)
- Corpus Christi (Boże Ciało) (2019)
- The Hater (2020)
- Good Boy (2025)
- Anniversary (2025)

=== Short film ===
- Nice To See You (2003)
- Mary Komasa: Lost Me (2016)

=== Television ===
- Teatr telewizji (TV Series) - Golgota wrocławska episode (2008)
- Krew z krwi (TV Series, second season) (2015)
- Ultraviolet (TV Series, 5 episodes) (2018)
