= The Red Spider =

2015 Polish thriller film directed by Marcin Koszałka

- Directed by: Marcin Koszałka
- Written by: Marcin Koszałka, Łukasz M. Maciejewski
- Starring: Filip Pławiak, Adam Woronowicz, Julia Kijowska
- Cinematography: Marcin Koszałka
- Edited by: Krzysztof Komander, Marcin Koszałka
- Music by: Petr Ostrouchov
- Release date: 2015
- Running time: 90 minutes
- Country: Poland
- Language: Polish

The Red Spider (Polish: Czerwony pająk) is a 2015 Polish thriller film directed by Marcin Koszałka and written by Koszałka and Łukasz M. Maciejewski.

== Plot ==
"The Red Spider" for the film, which was inspired by the story of Karol Kot, a serial killer operating in Kraków in the 1960s, also known as the "Vampire from Kraków." Karol from Red Spider is a teenager like everyone else – young, well-built, on the verge of life. He comes from a good home, there are no problems at school, success, successes in sports, he falls in love. Everything is about being good, but it's not. The turning point in his life is when he accidentally witnesses a murder. Driven by curiosity, start following the killer. In this way, he discovers the dark side of his nature that existence was unaware.

== Cast ==
- Filip Pławiak as Karol Kremer
- Adam Woronowicz as Lucjan Staniak
- Julia Kijowska as Danka
- Wojciech Zieliński as Florek
- Małgorzata Foremniak as Karol's mother
- Marek Kalita as Karol's father

Source.

== Accolades ==
The film received Shadi Abd El Salam Award for best film at the Cairo International Film Critics Week and French Syndicate of Cinema Critics Award at the Arras Film Festival, both in 2015. It was nominated at the 2016 Polish Film Award ceremony for best cinematography (Marcin Koszałka) and best costume design (Magdalena Biedrzycka). Also in 2016 it received awards for best actor (Adam Woronowicz) and best cinematography (Koszałka) at the Młodzi i Film Festival in Koszalin; as well as Special Jury Prize at the Polish Film Festival. Filip Pławiak was nominated to Zbigniew Cybulski Award for the role of Karol Kremer in 2016.
