= Simona Kossak (film) =

Biographical film directed by Adrian Panek

- Directed by: Adrian Panek
- Written by: Adrian Panek
- Produced by: Magdalena Kaminska; Agata Szymanska
- Starring: Sandra Drzymalska; Agata Kulesza; Jakub Gierszał; Borys Szyc
- Cinematography: Jakub Stolecki
- Edited by: Piotr Kmiecik
- Music by: Bartosz Chajdecki
- Production companies: Balapolis; Polish Film Institute; Warsaw Documentary Film Studio; Krakow Festival Office; Hollman Emea Limited
- Distributed by: Next Film (Poland)
- Release date: November 15, 2024
- Country: Poland
- Language: Polish
- Box office: $835,297

Simona Kossak is a Polish biographical drama film directed and written by Adrian Panek. The film stars Sandra Drzymalska as a scientist and ecologist, Simona Kossak. It also stars Jakub Gierszał as Lech Wilczek, and Agata Kulesza as her mother, Elżbieta Kossak. The film premiered at the 24th New Horizons mBank International Film Festival in July 2024. It later screened at the 49th Polish Film Festival receiving positive reviews. The film was released by Next Film in Poland in November 2024.

== Cast ==
- Sandra Drzymalska as Simona Kossak
- Agata Kulesza as Elżbieta Kossak
- Jakub Gierszał as Lech Wilczek
- Borys Szyc as Batura
- Olga Bołądź as Hanna Gucwinska
- Dariusz Chojnacki as Antoni Gucwinski
- Marta Stalmierska

== Production ==
The film was supported by Polish Film Institute in May 2022. It was co-financed by Balapolis, Polish Film Institute and Warsaw Documentary Film Studio. In October, 2023, it was reported that Sandra Drzymalska would star as Simona Kossak Also was cast Jakub Gierszał, Agata Kulesza, Borys Szyc, Olga Bołądź, Dariusz Chojnacki and Marta Stalmierska. Principal photography began in fall 2023 in Podlaskie Voivodeship, and wrapped on November.

== Awards and nominations ==
At the 2024 Polish Film Festival, Simona Kossak was selected for Golden Lions.
