= Karol Kot =

Polish murderer (1946–1968)

- Kot's 1966 mugshot
- Born: 18 December 1946; Kraków, Republic of Poland
- Died: 16 May 1968 (aged 21); Katowice, Polish People's Republic
- Cause of death: Execution by hanging
- Other name: The Vampire of Kraków
- Status: Executed
- Motive: Sadism
- Convictions: Murder (2 counts); Attempted murder (10 counts); Arson (4 counts)
- Penalty: Death

Details
- Victims: 2
- Span of crimes: 1964–1966
- Country: Poland

Karol Kot (18 December 1946 – 16 May 1968) was a Polish murderer who terrorized the city of Kraków between 1964 and 1966. Due to trial evidence and to the seemingly random choices of victims, which included children and elderly people, Kot was nicknamed the Vampire of Kraków (Polish: Wampir z Krakowa). After the trial, in which Kot pleaded guilty to all the crimes with which he was charged, he was sentenced to death on 14 July 1967. After an appeal initially reduced his sentence to life in prison, his sentence was reinstated. Kot was hanged on 16 May 1968.

== Early life ==
Kot spent his whole life in Kraków. His family consisted of his father, who was an engineer, his mother, and a sister who was eight years younger than him. For family summer holidays, the four would travel to Pcim, to the south of Kraków, where a bored Kot began to regularly visit a butcher shop and became increasingly fascinated by knives, dying animals, and blood. Kot found pleasure in watching death and, at the encouragement of some of the abattoirs, in drinking still-warm pig's blood. The young Kot would also torture small animals; he was abusive to his sister's cats.

== Crimes ==
Kot's public crimes occurred in two separate sprees. On 21 September 1964, Kot attacked Helene Velgen (48), whom he stabbed in church. He drove the knife into her back, from behind, when she knelt down to pray; however, Velgen survived this attack. The second attempted murder occurred shortly after, on 23 September, when Kot spotted Franciszka Lewendowska (78) leaving a tram. He followed her and stabbed her in the back while on the stairs to her apartment. This attack was also unsuccessful, and both victims reported seeing a young male attacker. Six days later, on 29 September, he stabbed Maria Plichta (86) from behind, after he spotted her near a church and followed her to Jana Street. She died the next day, but not before Kot visited the hospital and inquired about the victim.

After a lull of seventeen months, the attacks began to occur again. On 13 February 1966, in an overkill, Kot fatally stabbed an 11-year-old boy, Leszek Całek, near Kościuszko Mound, where a toboggan contest for children was being held. On 14 April 1966, he attacked an 8-year-old girl named 'Małgosia'. Kot went to a tenement on Jana III Sobieskiego Street and assaulted her when she came downstairs to collect letters from the mailbox. He grabbed her and dealt eight stab wounds to the stomach, chest and back. The girl managed to return home, and was taken to the hospital where the doctors managed to save her life. Four days later, Kot returned to the scene, enquiring about the victim's name from her mother.

During the break between attacks, Kot tried to poison random people. He bought some arsenic and went to Przy Błoniach, a bar, where he took a bottle of vinegar from the counter. When certain that nobody was looking, he laced it with arsenic, hoping that somebody would later use it and be poisoned. He often left bottles of beer or soda pop poisoned with arsenic out in the open in popular places, but nobody ever drank them. He once poured a large quantity of arsenic into a schoolmate's drink, but the boy noticed a suspicious smell and refused to drink it. During the trial, expert witnesses stated that the amount of arsenic used by Kot was sufficient to kill anybody who would drink the beverage. During this time, he also plotted four other murders, all without success, as well as initiating several unsuccessful acts of arson.

== Trial and sentence ==
Kot during his murder trial

Kot boasted of his crimes to a fellow student, Danuta (whom Kot had a romantic fixation), who informed authorities. He was arrested on 1 June 1966, the day after his matura exam, which he was allowed to sit in order to prove that he was sane so that he could not later plead insanity during a trial. A search of his house revealed sixteen knives and an assortment of other weapons that belonged to him. On 3 June, Kot had his first formal interview, and on 6 July, in a police lineup, he was identified by Velgen, the woman he stabbed inside the church. He then openly admitted and detailed his attacks and other murder attempts, and was then charged with two murders, ten attempted murders (four by knife, and six by sodium arsenate), and four acts of arson.

Numerous expert witnesses were appointed to find the cause of Kot's psychopathic behaviour. They discovered that Kot had shown strange inclinations since early childhood. After a series of psychological observations and examinations, the doctors asserted that he was completely sane and could attend the trial with full consequences of his actions. When asked in an interview whether he was aware of the notion of murder being a crime and an evil deed, Kot presented his moral standards. According to him, what determines the moral appropriateness of human actions is the fact that they bring an individual satisfaction and a sense of fulfilled duty; he, therefore, considered himself a murderer, but not an evil person.

In Kot's words, evil men were drunkards and those who had sex with prostitutes. He viewed himself as "only a murderer." "Suffering is beauty and inflicting pain and suffering on someone is a work of art," he said. "Not everyone can do it." Kot wondered if he may be set loose to remove "undesirable people" as a service to society.

The trial began on 3 May 1967, and Kot pleaded guilty to all charges. Surviving victims screamed at him in court, calling him a beast. The verdict was handed down on 14 July 1967, and Kot was sentenced to death as well as losing citizen rights. An appeal, based on diminished responsibility, began on 22 November 1967, and his sentence was commuted to life imprisonment. However, a higher court appeal reinstated the original sentence on 11 March 1968, and this sentence was carried out on 16 May 1968. After the hanging, an autopsy was allegedly carried out, which revealed a brain tumour. However, Przemysław Semczuk disputes this in his book. According to him, autopsies were not carried out on convicts sentenced to death. Moreover, no official document confirming the autopsy on Karol Kot exists.

Kot seemed unfazed by the fact that he would die, saying "The pleasure I felt when the knife was cleaving the meat… It’s impossible to describe the feeling. The experience is worth the gallows."

== Media ==
The killings were recreated for Episode 2, Season 1 of the show Killers: Behind the Myth called "Kot: The Vampire of Crakow", which aired in March 2014. It was also featured in episode 95 of Casefile True Crime Podcast in September 2018.

Kot was later featured in Most Evil Killers.

The song Roland by Interpol was loosely based on Kot.

Polish film The Red Spider based on the story of Karol Kot.

== See also ==
- List of serial killers by country
