= Yuma (2012 film) =

- Film poster
- Directed by: Piotr Mularuk
- Starring: Jakub Gierszał; Krzysztof Skonieczny
- Edited by: Agnieszka Glińska
- Release date: 30 June 2012 (KVIFF)
- Running time: 113 minutes
- Countries: Poland; Czech Republic
- Language: Polish

Yuma is a 2012 Polish-Czech action film directed by Piotr Mularuk.

== Cast ==
- Jakub Gierszał - Zyga
- Krzysztof Skonieczny - Kula (Bullet)
- Jakub Kamieński - Młot (Hammer)
- Tomasz Kot - Opat (Abbot)
- Katarzyna Figura - Halinka
- Karolina Chapko - Majka
- Helena Sujecka − Bajadera
- Malwina Wasilewska − Klara
- Jerzy Schejbal − Zyga's father
- Aldona Struzik − Zyga's mother
- Kazimierz Mazur − Rysio
- Tomasz Schuchardt − Ernest
- Zbigniew Stryj − Shopkeeper in Frankfuhrt
- Przemysław Bluszcz − Mayor
