= Marcin Koszałka =

Polish cinematographer and film director (born 1970)

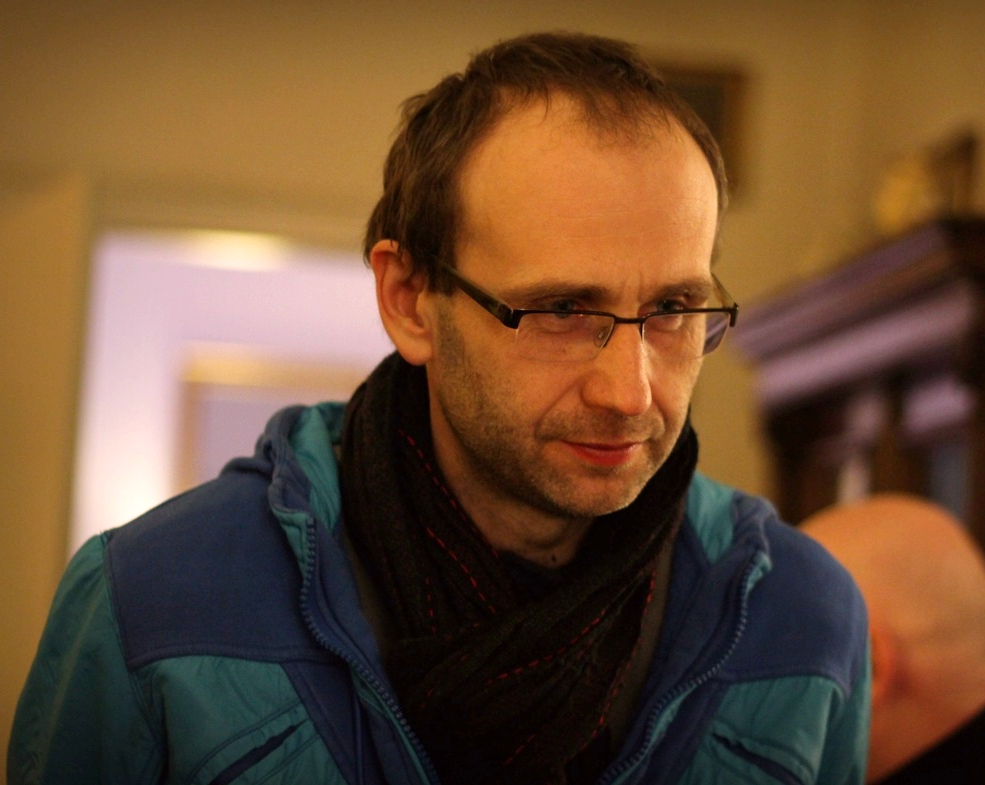
- Koszałka in 2014
- Born: 30 December 1970 (age 55); Kraków, Poland
- Education: Krzysztof Kieślowski Faculty of Radio and Television at the University of Silesia in Katowice
- Occupations: Film director, cinematographer
- Years active: 1999–present
- Spouse: Natalia Bartkowicz-Koszałka

Marcin Koszałka (born 30 December 1970) is a Polish cinematographer and film director.

In 1995 he began his studies in Cinematography and Photography at the Krzysztof Kieślowski Film School in Katowice., from which he graduated in 2001. In 2014 for his work entitled "Obsession with death in images of my documentaries" he obtained a doctorate degree in film studies and is now a lecturer in this university. He is the author of cinematography for many significant works of contemporary Polish cinema and a member of the Polish and European Film Academy. He is also a director of documentaries and feature films, including The Red Spider and White Courage, for which he writes scripts and is involved in the editing process.

== Early life ==
Despite his cinematographic education, since the beginning of his career Marcin Koszałka has been fighting to avoid being pigeonholed and working only as a cinematographer. In 1999, after making two short films, he made his debut as a director with Such a Nice Boy I Gave Birth to, a document focused on relations within his own family. The film was received enthusiastically in Poland and abroad, bringing him awards in Berlin, Kraków, Kazimierz Dolny and Nyon. In this movie Marcin Koszałka concentrates on the story of his own family, which caused quite a stir and controversy among Polish documentalists and subjected Koszałka to criticism from senior colleagues, who quite differently perceived a place of documentary movies in Polish cinema. Since then, Marcin Koszałka has been one of the most important Polish documentary filmmakers of his generation.

After this debut, he has made other movies, like: It Will Be All Right, Death with a Human Face, Whole Day Together (dedicated to Jerzy Nowak), The Existence, Till it Hurts, Let’s Run Away from Her (dedicated to Piotr Korczak, a prominent Polish climber), The Declaration of Immortality, You'll Be a Legend, Man (a movie about Polish footballers preparing for UEFA Euro 2012), and The Lust Killer. The latter document, which indirectly tells the story of a serial killer from Bytom, led Koszałka to a directorial debut in a feature film. That is how The Red Spider, an artistic thriller, was created. After the release in Poland, it was highly acclaimed by critics, film industry and audience yearning for artistic cinema, with some stylistic features indicating a genre affiliation. Marcin Koszałka not only directed the movie but also wrote the script and led the cinematography and editing. He had full artistic control over his feature film directorial debut.

Among Koszałka's works are renowned and appreciated movies like: The Welts, Drowsiness and Close-ups by Magdalena Piekorz, The Lovers of Marona by Izabella Cywińska, Scratch by Michał Rosa, Reverse by Borys Lankosz, Entanglement by Jacek Bromski and The Happiness of the World, the latest film by Michał Rosa. Koszałka worked as cinematographer for television plays (i.a. Four of Them – the last directorial work of Marcin Wrona) and documents made by his colleagues (i.a. Plus Minus or a Fly's Trips to the East by Bogdan Dziworski). His works have brought him numerous awards and prizes.

== Personal life ==
Marcin Koszałka is married to Natalia Bartkowicz, they have a daughter Zofia and son Antek. Koszałka enjoys alpine climbing and mountain-climbing in the Tatras. He was a member of the honorary support committee of Bronisław Komorowski before early presidential elections in Poland in 2010 and before the presidential elections in 2015.

== Awards and nominations ==
After the success of the movie Such a Nice Boy I Gave Birth to, another projects brought him i.a.: a Certificate of Merit for a movie Name Day at Vilnius International Film Festival, "Gold OFF" in the category of documentary film at International Film Festival OFFensiva for It Will Be All Right, awards at Kraków Film Festival and Jihlava International Documentary Film Festival for Whole Day Together, Audience Award at Kraków Film Festival and at Nyon International Documentary Film Festival, as well as Grand Prix at festival in Tehran for The Existence, awards for Till it Hurts at festivals in Kraków, Karlovy Vary, Leipzig and Łódź, numerous awards for Declaration of Immortality (i.a. audience awards at Kraków Mountain Festival, Kraków Film Festival and Mountain Film Meetings - Zakopane, awards at festivals in Bolzano, Bristol, Chicago, Gdansk, Karlovy Vary, Tampere, Trento, Bratislava, Teplice, Vancouver). His work as cinematographer has brought him numerous awards and prizes. The Welts received an award for Best Cinematography at the Polish Film Festival in Gdynia and a nomination for the Polish Film Awards: Eagles. Reverse also won at the Polish Film Festival in Gdynia, the Golden Duck awarded by Film magazine, Bronze Frog at Camerimage, nomination for the Polish Film Awards: Eagles and award for best cinematography at the Nationwide Festival of the Film Art Prowincjonalia. The movie Close-ups was awarded for best cinematography at the Nationwide Festival of the Film Art Prowincjonalia.

The Red Spider, his feature film directorial debut, received i.a. awards at festivals in Arras and Cairo, Special Mention in the Best Polish Debut category at Forum of European Cinema ORLEN Cinergia in Łódź and nomination for the awards of The Polish Society of Cinematographers and Polish Film Awards Eagles 2016.

In 2014, the National Audiovisual Institute released a special DVD box set of his documentary films, thereby inviting Koszałka to the circle of the most outstanding Polish documentalists, who received similar recognition. Marcin Koszałka was nominated twice for the Polityka's Passport – in 2007 for The Existence and in 2010 for cinematography for Reverse. He has been a juror at national and international film festivals. In 2016 his debut Such a Nice Boy I Gave Birth to was listed among 10 best Polish documentaries of all times, a ranking announced during the “100/100. An Epoch of Polish Documentary Film” project.

In April 2016 Marcin Koszałka won the Best Director award for The Red Spider at the goEast Festival of Central and Eastern European Films in Wiesbaden. The movie was also awarded with FIPRESCI Award and an Honourable Mention from the 3sat cultural channel.

== Selected filmography ==
=== Cinematographer ===
- 2004: Pręgi (The Welts)
- 2005: Kochankowie Roku Tygrysa (The Tiger Love)
- 2005: Kochankowie z Marony (The Lovers of Marona)
- 2008: Rysa (Scratch)
- 2008: Senność (Sleepiness)
- 2008: House
- 2009: Rewers
- 2011: Uwikłanie (Entanglement)

=== Director ===
- 1999: Takiego pięknego syna urodziłam
- 2003: Imieniny
- 2003: Made in Poland
- 2004: Jakoś to będzie
- 2006: Cały dzień razem
- 2006: Śmierć z ludzką twarzą
- 2007: Istnienie (The Existence)
- 2007: Do bólu
- 2007: Martwe ciało
- 2008: Dekalog... po Dekalogu
- 2010: Ucieknijmy od niej
- 2010: Deklaracja nieśmiertelności (Declaration of Immortality)
- 2013: Będziesz legendą, człowieku (You Will be a Legend, Man)
- 2015: Czerwony Pająk (The Red Spider)
- 2024: Biała odwaga (White Courage)
