= Scratch (2008 film) =

- Directed by: Michał Rosa
- Written by: Michał Rosa
- Starring: Jadwiga Jankowska-Cieślak; Krzysztof Stroiński
- Cinematography: Marcin Koszałka
- Music by: Stanisław Radwan
- Release date: 15 September 2008 (GFF)
- Running time: 89 minutes
- Country: Poland
- Language: Polish

Scratch (Polish: Rysa) is a 2008 Polish drama film directed by Michał Rosa.

== Cast ==
- Jadwiga Jankowska-Cieślak as Joanna Kocjan
- Krzysztof Stroiński as Jan Zólwienski
- Ewa Telega as Beata
- Mirosława Marcheluk as Nastka
- Teresa Marczewska as Hanka
- Ryszard Filipski as Marczak
- Stanisław Radwan as Iwo
- Jerzy Schejbal as Jacek
- Jerzy Nowak as Leon
- Kinga Preis as Zosia
- Alicja Bienicewicz as Mrs. Olga
