= Magdalena Piekorz =

Polish film director

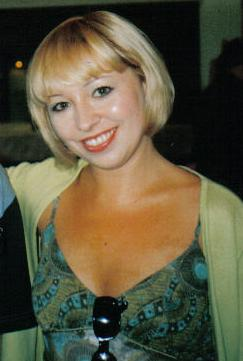
- Shown in 2007
- Born: 2 October 1974 (age 51); Sosnowiec, Poland
- Education: University of Silesia
- Occupations: Film director, screenwriter, actress
- Awards: Golden Lions (2004)

Magdalena Piekorz (born 2 October 1974, Sosnowiec) is a Polish film director, screenwriter as well as film and theatre actress.

== Life and career ==
She graduated from the Krzysztof Kieślowski Film School of the University of Silesia in Katowice where she studied film directing. Initially, she mostly directed documentary films. In 1997, she made her film debut when she directed the documentary The Girls From Szymanów for which she received a prize at the Polish Festival of Documentary and Short Films. Her 1998 film, Franciscan Spontan, dealt with religious themes and the music for the film was written by Michał Lorenc. Her 2001 film, To Find, To See, To Bury tells the story of the Srebrenica massacre. In 2002, she directed a documentary TV series Chicago portraying the life of Polish community in the US state of Illinois.

In 2004, she made her feature film debut when she directed Pręgi ("Welts") tackling the issue of domestic violence and based on the prose of Nike Award-winning author Wojciech Kuczok. The film was critically acclaimed and won the Golden Lions Award at the 29th Gdynia Film Festival. It was also selected as the Polish entry for the Best Foreign Language Film at the 77th Academy Awards.

Since 2018, she has served as the artistic director at the Adam Mickiewicz Theatre in Częstochowa.

== Filmography ==
- Documentary films:
  - Dziewczyny z Szymanowa (1997)
  - Franciszkański spontan (1998)
  - Przybysze (1999)
  - Labirynt (2001)
  - Znaleźć, zobaczyć, pochować (2001)
  - Chicago (2002, documentary series)
- Feature films:
  - Pręgi (2004)
  - Senność (2008)
  - Zbliżenia (2014)

== See also ==
- Cinema of Poland
- List of Poles
