= Powrót =

Polish television series

- Genre: Black comedy; Comedy drama
- Country of origin: Poland
- Original language: Polish
- No. of seasons: 1
- No. of episodes: 6

Production
- Production location: Warsaw

Powrót (English: Return) is a Polish black comedy drama series commissioned by Canal+ featuring Bartłomiej Topa, Wojciech Mecwaldowski, and Magdalena Walach.
