= Julian Świeżewski =

Actor (born 1991)

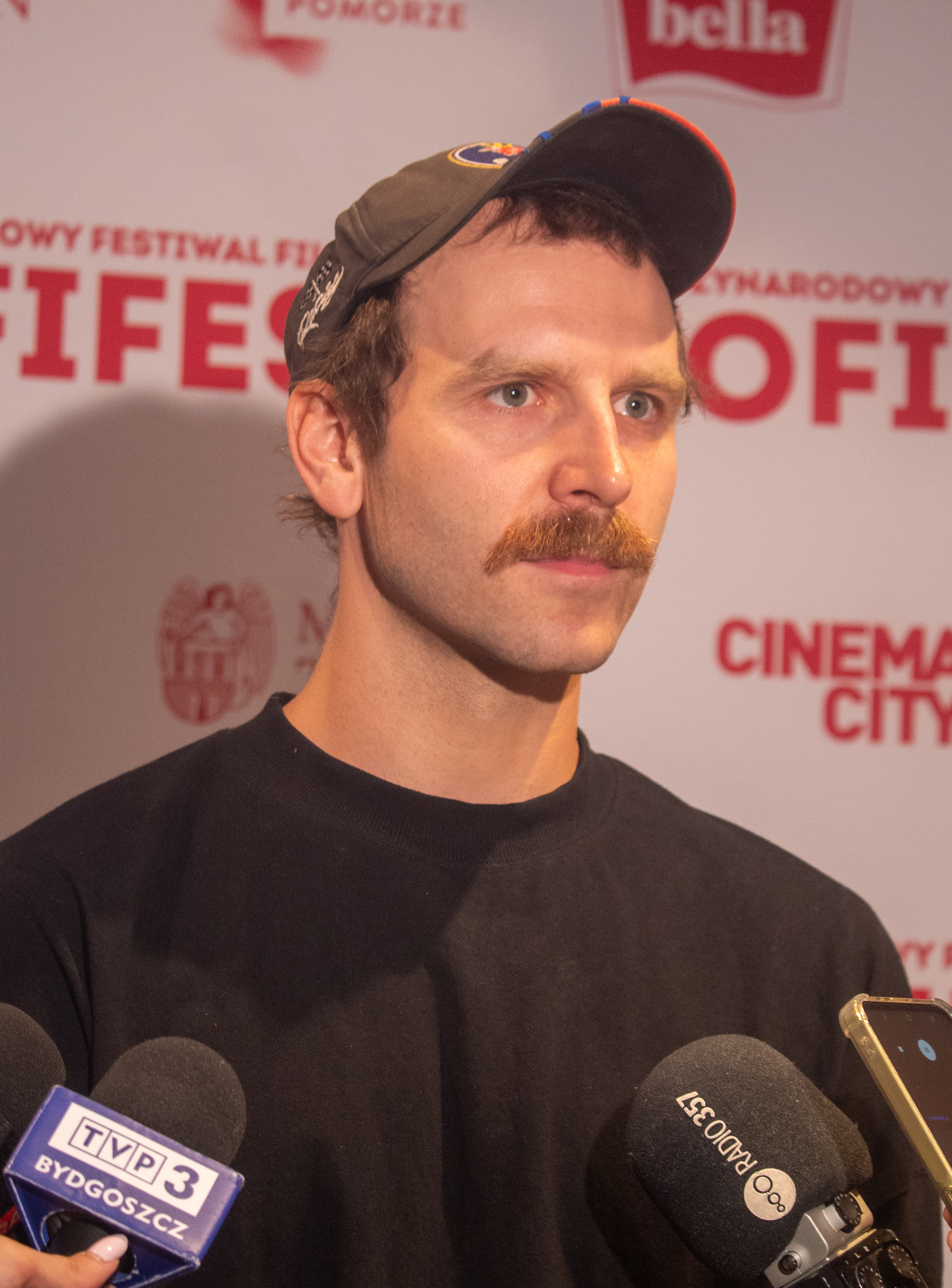
- Julian Świeżewski, 2024
- Born: 4 June 1991 (age 35); Bydgoszcz, Poland
- Citizenship: Polish
- Occupation: Actor

Julian Świeżewski (born 4 June 1991) is a Polish film and stage actor.

== Filmography ==
- Sweat (2020) as Klaudiusz
- Prime Time (2021) as Dawid (voice)
- The Mire (Rojst '97, 2021), TV series
- Filip (2022) as Kazik
- Infamy (Infamia, 2023), TV series, as priest Kuba
- Absolute Beginners (Absolutni debiutanci, 2023), TV series, as Marcin, Igor's coach
- White Courage (Biała odwaga, 2024) as Maciek Zawrat, brother of Andrzej
- Brat (2024) as Konrad Górecki, Dawid's coach
- Kidnapped: The Chloe Ayling Story (2024), TV series, as MD/Łukasz Herba
- Heweliusz (2025), TV series, as the military courier
- Flesh and Fuel (2026), as Bartosz

== Awards ==
He won 2025 Polish Film Award for Best Supporting Actor, Zbigniew Cybulski Award and award for best supporting actor at the Polish Film Festival for his role in White Courage.
