= Daas (2011 film) =

2011 Polish film by Adrian Panek

- Directed by: Adrian Panek
- Written by: Adrian Panek
- Produced by: Lambros Ziotas
- Starring: Andrzej Chyra; Mariusz Bonaszewski; Danuta Stenka; Olgierd Łukaszewicz
- Cinematography: Arkadiusz Tomiak
- Edited by: Witold Chomiński
- Production company: Argomedia (film company)
- Distributed by: Best Film
- Release date: October 7, 2011
- Running time: 102 minutes
- Country: Poland
- Language: Polish

Daas is a 2011 Polish film written and directed by Adrian Panek and starring Andrzej Chyra, Danuta Stenka, Mariusz Bonaszewski and Olgierd Łukaszewicz. This is Panek's first feature work.

The film is a period drama that depicts a struggle between religion and secular authority, idealism and duplicity, eroticism and faith. Daas was filmed in the Polish city of Wrocław.

== Plot ==
Daas explores the influence of 18th-century messiah claimant Jacob Frank (an authentic figure played by Olgierd Łukaszewicz). Claiming powers of mystical healing and prophecy, Frank promises immortality to his converts. Henryk Klein, a Viennese lawyer (Mariusz Bonaszewski) investigates Frank, and starts to believe that there has been a conspiracy formed that involves some of the most influential people in the Austrian Empire.

Meanwhile, a minor nobleman, Jakub Goliński (Andrzej Chyra), Frank's long-time disciple who left his sect, is seeking justice. Once a devoted believer, he now takes action against his former guru. The fates of these men inevitably interweave…
