= Jakub Gierszał =

Polish actor (born 1988)

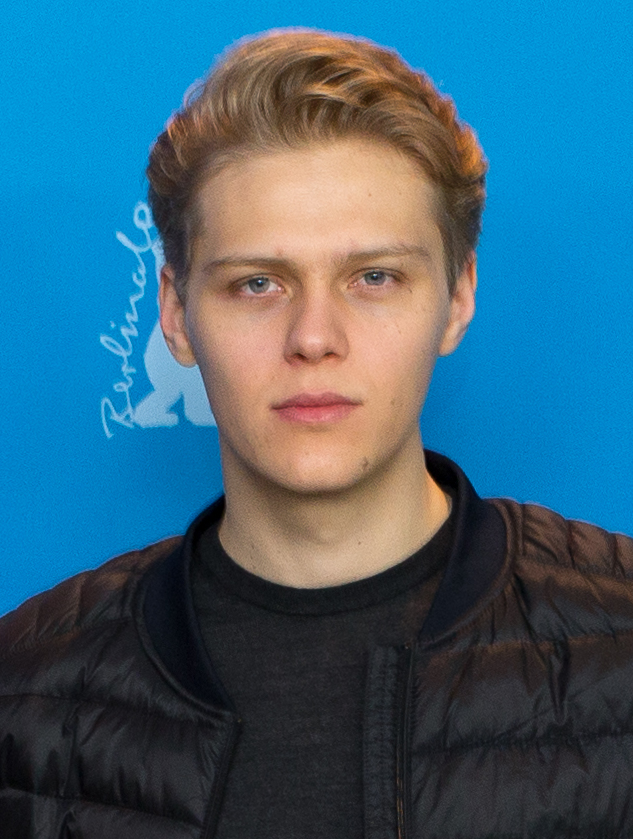
- Gierszał in 2017
- Born: 20 March 1988 (age 38); Kraków, Poland
- Occupation: Actor
- Years active: 2009–present

Jakub Gierszał (born 20 March 1988) is a Polish actor. His screen debut was in 2009, playing the role of Kazik in the film All That I Love. He later starred in the thriller film Suicide Room (2011), in which he played the character of Dominik, a high school student from a wealthy family who developed a mental health problem. He is three-time Polish Film Awards nominee.

== Early life ==
Gierszał was born in Kraków. His father, Marek, is a theatre director working mainly in Germany. When Jakub was a few months old, his parents moved to Hamburg. After 11 years he returned to Poland and settled in Toruń. He studied at the Kraków Academy of Dramatic Arts, graduating in 2012.

== Career ==
In 2012, he was a Polish Film Award nominee for Best Actor for his role in Suicide Room. Gierszał also received a Shooting Stars Award that year. He earned his second Polish Film Award nomination for Best Actor for Breaking the Limits (2017) and his third for Doppelgänger (2023).

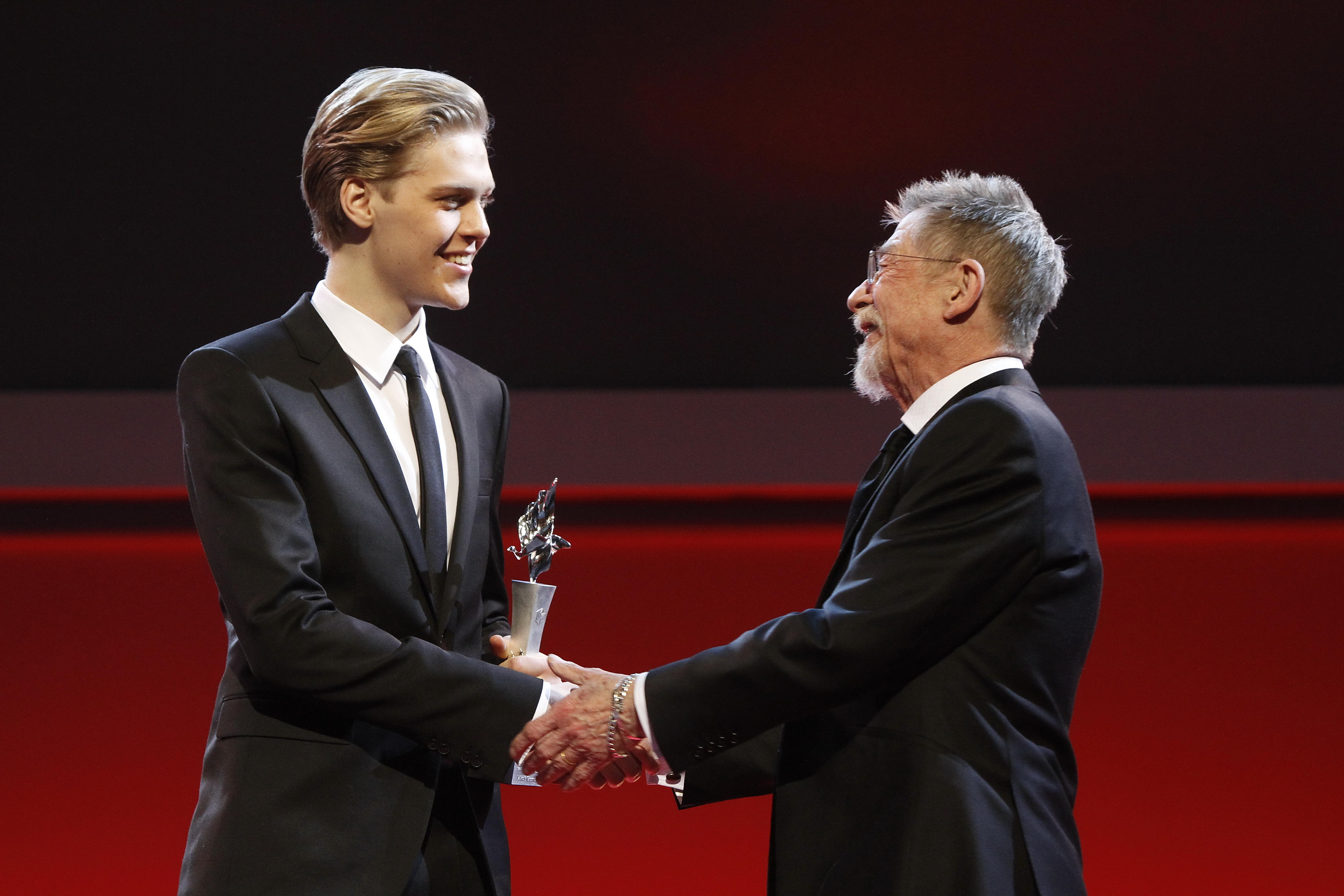
Gierzal at Shooting Stars 2012

== Filmography ==
=== Film ===
Year	Title	Role	Notes
2009	All That I Love	Kazik	
2010	Milion dolarów	Pawełek Leo	
2011	Suicide Room	Dominik Santorski	Shooting Stars Award; Nominated — Polish Academy Award for Best Actor
2012	Yuma	Zyga	
2013	Lasting	Michał	
2013	Finsterworld	Maximilian Sandberg	
2013	The Fold	Lukas	
2014	Hiszpanka	Krystian Ceglarski	
2014	Dracula Untold	Acemi	
2015	Performer	Collector	
2015	The Lure	the bass player	
2016	Morris from America	Per	
2017	Spoor	Dyzio	
2017	PolandJa	Artur	
2017	Zgoda	Erwin	
2017	Beyond Words	Michael	
2017	Breaking the Limits	Jerzy Górski	Gdynia Film Festival Golden Kangaroo Award; Nominated — Polish Academy Award for Best Actor
2019	Giraffe	Lucek	
2019	Powrót birbanta. Rekonstrukcja	Birbant	Short film
2021	The Getaway King	Antos	
2023	Zadra	Motyl	
2023	Vamos a la playa	Wanja	
2023	Doppelgänger	Hans Steiner	Nominated — Polish Academy Award for Best Actor
2023	Ultima Thule	Bartek	
2024	White Courage	Wolfram von Kamitz	Nominated — Polish Academy Award for Best Supporting Actor
2024	Colors of Evil: Red	Leopold Bilski	
2024	Simona Kossak	Lech Wilczek	
2026	Colors of Evil: Black	Leopold Bilski	
2026	The Duel	Grabowski	
2026	The Meltdown	Alexander	
2026	Through the Wall	Jerzy Śmiechowski	

=== Television ===
Year	Title	Role	Notes
2013	The Devil with the Three Golden Hairs	Felix	Television film
2015	Der Liebling des Himmels	Leo Sorel	Television film
2015	Crossing Lines	Jovan Petric	Episode: "Enemy of the People"
2016	Emma nach Mitternacht - Frau Hölle	Maxim Ionow	Television film
2018	Das Boot	Schmidt	Episodes: "Verluste" and "Zweifel"
2021	Tatort	Nicolai Timofejew	Episode: "Macht der Familie"
2018–2022	The Defence	Piotr Langer Junior	Series regular, 25 episodes
