= Krzysztof Kieślowski Film School =

Film school of the University of Silesia

- Szkoła Filmowa im. Krzysztofa Kieślowskiego Uniwersytetu Śląskiego
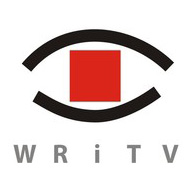
- Type: Public university
- Established: October 3, 1978
- Affiliations: University of Silesia, Erasmus+
- Rector: prof. dr hab. Andrzej Kowalczyk
- Director: dr hab. Krystyna Doktorowicz prof. UŚ
- Students: ca. 600
- Location: św. Pawła 3 St., 40-008, Katowice, Poland; 50.2586°N 19.0298°E
- Campus: Urban
- Website: Official website

Location of Krzysztof Kieślowski Film School in Katowice within Poland
Location of Krzysztof Kieślowski Film School in Katowice within Europe

The Krzysztof Kieślowski Film School (also known as Katowice Film School) is a Polish film and television school established in 1978 and based in Katowice, Poland. It is a full-time film school and offers MA courses in Directing, Cinematography and Photography, Film and Television Producing. Kieślowski Film School is allowed to award PhD degree. One of its first tutors was Krzysztof Kieślowski. It is a part of University of Silesia.

In 2017 film school was moved to brand new building at Pawła street no 3 in the downtown of Katowice. The building won the Brick Award and was shortlisted to the Mies Van Der Rohe Award in 2019.

Students from Krzysztof Kieślowski Film School were awarded nine times at the Camerimage Festival, including four Golden Tadpoles, two Silver Tadpoles, two Bronze Tadpoles and one Blue Tadpole for the best film of the decade.

== Authorities ==
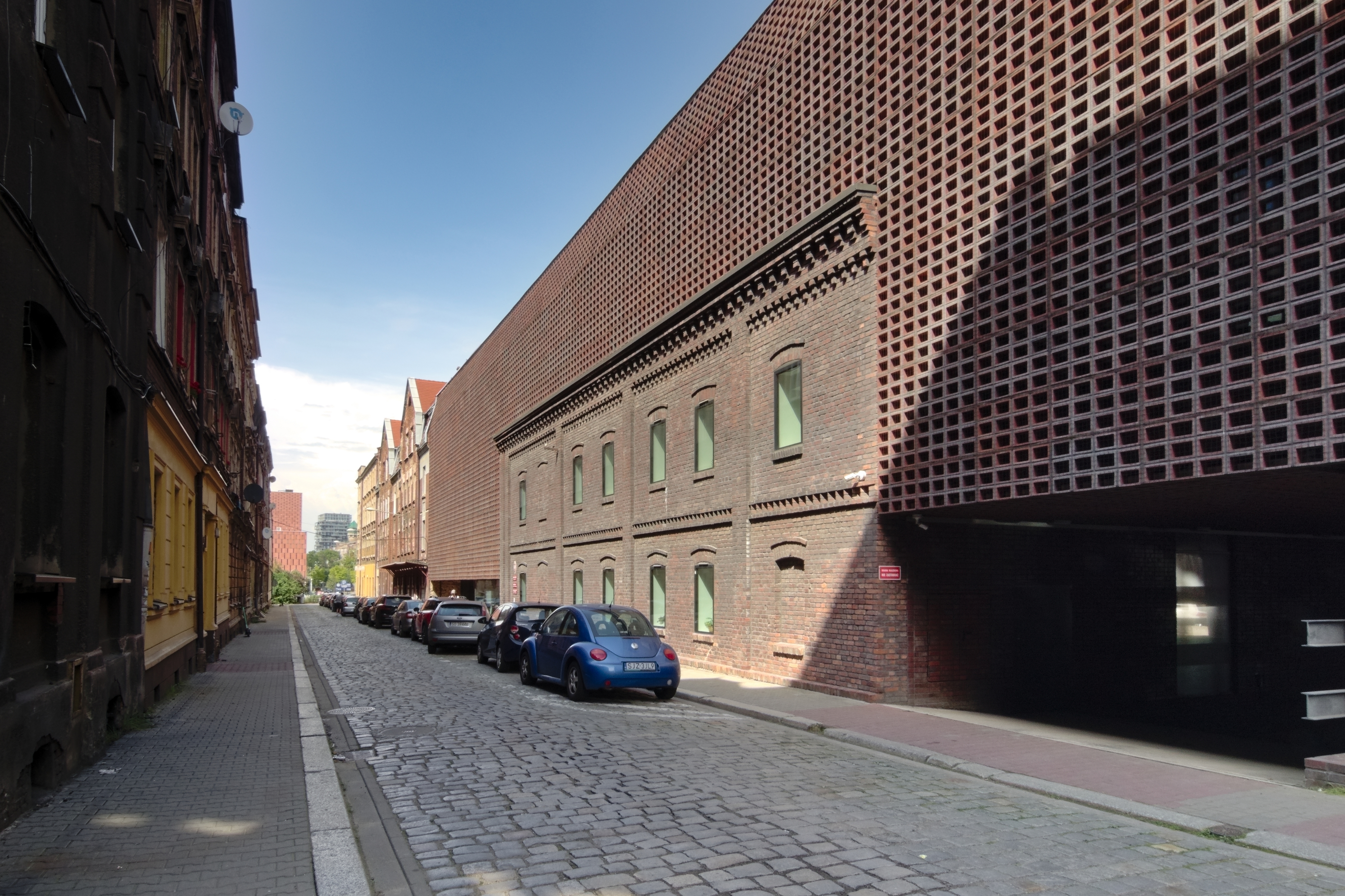
Krzysztof Kieślowski Film School

- Dean Assoc. Prof. Krystyna Doktorowicz, Professor of the University of Silesia
  - Deputy Dean for Education and Student Adrian Robak.
  - Deputy Dean for Internationalisation and Organisation Dr Eng. Olaf Flak
  - Deputy Dean for the Arts Full Prof. Jerzy Łukaszewicz

== Structure ==
- Institute of Film and Theatre Arts - Director of the Institute Dr Jarosław Świerszcz

== Research and artistic activity ==
Main research areas:

- Film and television directing, cinematography
- Artistic photography
- Media Studies, audiovisual law
- Cinema and film production

== Courses of studies ==
=== Full-time BA courses ===
- Film and Television Directing
- Film and Television Producing

=== Full-time MA courses ===
- Film and Television Directing
- Cinematography, Directing and Art Photography (long-term)
- Film and Television Producing
- Creative Management in New Media (lectures in English)

=== Part-time BA and MA courses ===
- Film and Television Producing

== Tutors ==
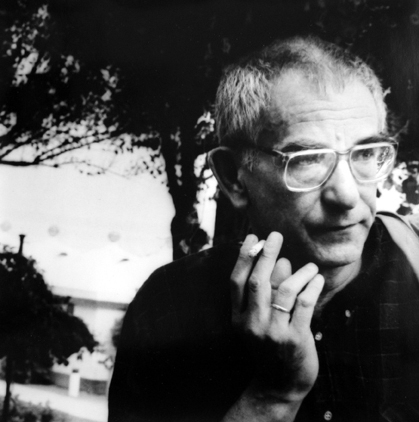
Krzysztof Kieślowski

- Maciej Pieprzyca
- Michał Rosa
- Bartosz Konopka
- Magdalena Piekorz
- Andrzej Jakimowski
- Marcin Koszałka
- Adam Sikora
- Bogdan Dziworski
- Jerzy Łukaszewicz
- Andrzej Fidyk
- Filip Bajon
- Krzysztof Zanussi

== Alumni ==
=== Directors ===
- Urszula Antoniak
- Maciej Dejczer
- Magdalena Holland-Łazarkiewicz
- Andrzej Jakimowski
- Kordian Kądziela
- Bartosz Konopka (Academy Award nomination in 2010)
- Jan P. Matuszyński
- Magdalena Piekorz
- Maciej Pieprzyca
- Michał Rosa
- Agnieszka Smoczyńska
- Marcin Wrona
- Maria Zmarz-Koczanowicz

=== Cinematographers ===
- Paweł Dyllus
- Paweł Flis
- Marcin Koszałka

== Other names ==
=== Former name ===
- 1978-2019 - Krzysztof Kieślowski Faculty of Radio and Television at the University of Silesia in Katowice (Polish: Wydział Radia i Telewizji im. Krzysztofa Kieślowskiego Uniwersytetu Śląskiego w Katowicach)

=== Common names ===
- Katowice Film School
- Silesian Film School

== See also ==
- Cinema of Poland
- Film
- Film school
- List of film schools
- Glossary of motion picture terms
