= Suicide Room =

2011 Polish drama film by Jan Komasa

- Theatrical release poster
- Directed by: Jan Komasa
- Written by: Jan Komasa
- Produced by: Jerzy Kapuściński
- Starring: Jakub Gierszał
- Cinematography: Radosław Ładczuk
- Edited by: Bartosz Pietras
- Music by: Michal Jacaszek
- Production companies: Mediabrigade; Odra-Film; Polski Instytut Sztuki Filmowej; Studio Filmowe Kadr
- Distributed by: ITI Cinema
- Release dates: 12 February 2011 (Berlinale); 4 March 2011 (Poland)
- Running time: 110 minutes
- Country: Poland
- Language: Polish
- Budget: 6 million zł
- Box office: $7.2 million

Suicide Room (Polish: Sala Samobójców) is a 2011 Polish drama thriller film written and directed by Jan Komasa, and starring Jakub Gierszał as a popular high school student whose life quickly deteriorates into ostracisation and depression.

The film premiered on 12 February 2011 at the 61st Berlin International Film Festival and received a wide release on 4 March 2011. It garnered positive reviews, and went on to win several awards, including best actor (Jakub Gierszał), best actress (Roma Gąsiorowska), best screenplay (Jan Komasa) and best film.

== Plot ==
Dominik Santorski is a popular but spoiled teenager, whose success-driven parents are out of touch with his life. At school, Dominik and his friends stumble upon a self-harm video while using his computer. Later, Dominik watches the rest of the video and leaves a comment for the poster.

While drinking at an after-prom party, a girl admits to lesbian experimentation. A classmate, Aleksander, dares the girl to kiss her female friend. She agrees as long as Aleksander agrees to kiss Dominik. The two girls comply, and Aleksander and Dominik as well. A video of the two boys kissing is posted to social media, and Dominik's friends appear to find it cool. Later, when Dominik and Aleksander spar at judo practice, Dominik becomes aroused. This event is relayed to social media, and people begin to harass Dominik online.

Dominik meets Sylwia, a suicidal girl who cuts herself and wears a mask, in an online chat group called "Sala Samobójców" (The Suicide Room). Dominik begins skipping school to spend time online. When Dominik sees an online video showing shadow puppets named after him and Aleksander engaging in homosexual acts, he rampages through his room. Sylwia mocks his pain and encourages him to scare normal people. Dominik adopts an alternative look and takes his father's gun to school. When Aleksander approaches him with some friends after school, Dominik begins to take out his gun, but flees to his taxi.

Dominik discovers that Sylwia is a shut-in who has not left her room in three years. Dominik stays locked in his room, talking with Sylwia. These events go unnoticed by his parents. Eventually, the family's housekeeper calls the police, who break down Dominik's door to find him sitting in a pool of blood beside a broken mirror. He is sent to a hospital and kept in a psychiatric ward for three days. His parents arrive to take him home, claiming that there is nothing wrong with him and that he should be studying for exams.

Dominik returns home and to The Suicide Room, where Sylwia tells him a love story in which the lovers die by suicide with pills and alcohol. After confessing that this is how she wants to die, she begs him to get pills for her. Having been sent to a psychiatrist, Dominik answers the questions in accordance with Sylwia's instructions. Sylwia feeds him answers that are designed to lead the doctor to give him the pills that she wishes to use. Dominik follows the lines Sylwia gives, but—in a plea for Sylwia to reconsider her suicide plan—continually remarks that no one should want to die.

As Dominik and Sylwia discuss where to meet and transfer the pills, Dominik's father rips out the router before their plans are set. Dominik panics, but later confesses to his parents. They forbid him from returning but, still wanting to see Sylwia, Dominik brings the pills to the bar they had discussed in the hope that Sylwia will show up. Dominik heads to the toilets and takes two handfuls of the pills. Dominik then finds a couple kissing and starts filming them. They take his camera and begin filming his delirium. Dominik returns to the bar, finds Sylwia, and kisses her passionately.

Later, at The Suicide Room, Sylwia talks about Dominik's long absence before seeing his avatar, only to learn that it's his mother, who announces that Dominik has died. It is revealed that Dominik never left the bathroom after taking the pills, and his overdose was filmed by the drunk couple. Dominik attempted to reverse his decision but to no avail. His death is posted online on The Suicide Room wall.

== Cast ==
- Jakub Gierszał as Dominik Santorski
- Roma Gąsiorowska as Sylwia
- Agata Kulesza as Beata Santorska
- Krzysztof Pieczyński as Andrzej Santorski
- Filip Bobek as Marcin
- Bartosz Gelner as Aleksander Lubomirski
- Danuta Borsuk as Nadia
- Piotr Nowak as Jacek
- Krzysztof Dracz as the Minister of Economy, Andrzej Santorski's boss
- Aleksandra Hamkało as Karolina
- Kinga Preis as a psychiatrist
- Anna Ilczuk as Ada
- Bartosz Porczyk as a stylist
- Wiesław Komasa as the principal
- Karolina Dryzner as Jowita
- Ewelina Paszke as the wife of the Minister of Economy
- Tomasz Schuchardt as a bodyguard
- Łukasz Krzyżaniak as a businessman in Beata Santorska office

== Festivals and awards ==
In April 2011 the movie received the International Federation of Film Critics award at the International Festival of Independent Cinema Off Plus Camera, in June of that year it won the Silver Lions award at the 36th Polish Film Festival and individual awards for sound and costumes for Bartosz Purkiewicz and Dorota Roqueoplo, respectively. Jakub Gierszał received the Audience Award and was nominated for the 2011 Zbyszek Cybulski Award for the role of Dominik. In November 2011 the movie won 3 Golden Duck statuettes, awarded by the readership of the Film magazine, in the categories: Best Cinematography, Best Script and Best Film. Jakub Gierszał also won the award for Best Actor.

Wins

- 14th Polish Film Awards
  - Eagle for Best Editing: Bartosz Pietras
  - Eagle for Discovery of the year: Jan Komasa
- Gold Ducks 2011
  - Best movie: Jan Komasa
  - Best actress: Roma Gąsiorowska
  - Best actor: Jakub Gierszał
  - Best script: Jan Komasa
  - Best photoshooting: Radosław Ładczuk
- New Horizons Film Festival 2011
  - New Polish Movies: Jan Komasa
  - Best Debut: Jan Komasa
- 36th Polish Film Festival
  - Silver lions for movie
  - Silver lions for producer: Jerzy Kapuściński
  - Another 2 individual prizes and 5 special prizes
- Camerimage 2011
  - The Best Polish Film

== Soundtrack ==
No.	Title	Artist	Length
1.	"Romans"	Adam Walicki
2.	"Grass So Bright"	Kyst
3.	"Baudelaire"	Rykarda Parasol
4.	"C'est la mort"	Stereo Total
5.	"Innerperspective"	Jacaszek
6.	"Climb Over"	Kyst
7.	"Introspection"	Jacaszek
8.	"Turn Me On"	Wet Fingers
9.	"Introspective"	Jacaszek
10.	"Nothing to Lose"	Billy Talent
11.	"White Sparrows"	Billy Talent
12.	"Introspective"	Jacaszek
13.	"Jeremy Kyle is a Marked Man"	Blakfish
14.	"Selfescape"	Jacaszek
15.	"Inscape"	Jacaszek
16.	"How I Want"	Kyst
17.	"Selfescape"	Jacaszek
18.	"Sign 0"	Chouchou
19.	"Sally with Randy"	Włodek Pawlik Quartet featuring Randy Brecker
20.	"Rock with me pumpin trump"	Wet Fingers
21.	"On My Mind"	Wawa & Houseshaker
22.	"Mazurka, Op. 17 No. 4 by Frédéric Chopin"	Magdalena Żuk
23.	"Cherry is Gone"	Rykarda Parasol
24.	"Piano Concerto No.23 in A Major, K 488 Adagio"	Mozart
25.	"Der Doppelgänger"	Schubert
