= Szymon Komasa =

Polish opera singer

Szymon Komasa (/ˈkɒməsɒ/, born 10 July 1985) is a Polish operatic baritone. A graduate of Juilliard School in New York and Guildhall School of Music and Drama in London and a prestigious BBC Cardiff Singer of the World finalist has performed both in new works and classic repertoire. Komasa is known for performances in opera, concerts, recordings, film, and at major public occasions and mainly sings in English, Italian, German, French, aside from his native Polish. The debut role of Demetrius in A Midsummer Night's Dream which he has sung at Teatro Massimo in Palermo (Italy) has gotten him a major attention. He performed at Opera Columbus in Columbus, Ohio, Dresden Semperoper, Peter Jay Sharp Theater in New York, Barbican Hall and Wigmore Hall in London, Carnegie Hall in New York, Arena di Verona, Grand Theatre in Łódź, Opera Nova in Bydgoszcz.

On February 14, 2019 Komasa released his debut album Polish Love Story.
