= Bartosz Chajdecki =

Polish film music composer (born 1980)

Bartosz Chajdecki (born 28 September 1980) is a Polish film music composer.

== Biography ==
He started composing at the age of 12. Four years later, he was already working with the Akne Theatre in Kraków, including on the play "A Little Requiem for Kantor", which was staged in England, Germany, France, Brazil. He received the Fringe First award at the Edinburgh International Theatre Festival for it. He has worked for the Yale School of Drama, the New York School of Visual Arts and the Samuel Beckett Theatre in London, among others. In 2004, he graduated with honours from the Academy of Music in Kraków.

Composer of music for feature films and TV e.g. The Duel, Simona Kossak, Gods, Breaking the Limits, Little Rose 2, Feast of Fire, The Champion of Auschwitz, Colors of Evil: Red, Life feels good, I'm a Killer, My Daughters of the Cow, Baczynski, Warsaw Uprising, Animals, Le temps d'Anna, the TV series Furia (season 2), Raven, The Behaviourist, Chyłka, Langer, Mission Afghanistan, A Vote of No Confidence, Days of Honor.

Winner of the Transatlantyk Oceans Award granted by composer Jan A. P. Kaczmarek, the special "Bo wARTo!" award as part of RMF Classic's MocArt and the Polish Soundtrack of the Year award for his music to the series "Raven". Winner of the Komeda Grand Prix for his music for the film "The Champion of Auschwitz" and nominated for the World Soundtrack Public Choice Award for this film. In 2024, he was nominated for the Polish Soundtrack of the Year, the Komeda Grand Prix and the World Soundtrack Public Choice Award for his soundtrack to the film "Little Rose 2".

In 2025, awarded in the category Film Music of the Year - MocArt RMF Classic for the soundtrack to the film "Simona Kossak" and nominated for the Polish Film Awards ORŁY (EAGLES), Grand Prix Komeda and the Polish Soundtrack of the Year award for this film.
