= 2026 Polish Film Awards =

28th Polish Film Awards
- Date: 9 March 2026
- Site: Polish Theatre, Warsaw, Poland
- Hosted by: Andrzej Konopka

Highlights
- Best Film: Home Sweet Home
- Most awards: Home Sweet Home (5)
- Most nominations: Home Sweet Home (13)

Television coverage
- Network: TVP Kultura; TVP1

The 28th Polish Film Awards took place on 9 March 2026 at the Polish Theatre in Warsaw, Poland. The ceremony honored the best in Polish cinema of 2025, presented by the Polish Film Academy. It was hosted by actor Andrzej Konopka and broadcast on TVP Kultura and TVP1.

Drama film Home Sweet Home won the most awards with five, including Best Film. Actress and director Krystyna Janda was honored with the Life Achievement Award.

== Winners and nominations ==
The nominations were announced on 11 February 2026. Drama film Home Sweet Home led the nominations with thirteen, followed by coming-of-age films Brother and No Ghosts on Good Street and biographical drama film Franz with ten.

=== Awards ===
Winners are listed first, highlighted in boldface, and indicated with a double dagger (‡).

**Best Film**: **Home Sweet Home – Directed by Wojciech Smarzowski**‡; The Altar Boys – Directed by Piotr Domalewski; Brother – Directed by Maciej Sobieszczański; Franz – Directed by Agnieszka Holland; No Ghosts on Good Street – Directed by Emi Buchwald	**Best European Film**: **Sirāt – Directed by Oliver Laxe (France / Spain)**‡; Bugonia – Directed by Yorgos Lanthimos (United States / South Korea / Ireland / Canada / United Kingdom); Flow – Directed by Gints Zilbalodis (Latvia / Belgium / France); Parthenope – Directed by Paolo Sorrentino (Italy / France); The Seed of the Sacred Fig – Directed by Mohammad Rasoulof (France / Germany / Iran)
**Best TV Series**: **Heweliusz – Directed by Jan Holoubek (Netflix)**‡; 1670 (Season 2) – Directed by Maciej Buchwald and Kordian Kądziela (Netflix); The Breslau Murders – Directed by Leszek Dawid (Disney+); Czarna śmierć – Directed by Kuba Czekaj (TVP1); The Eastern Gate – Directed by Jan P. Matuszyński (HBO Max)	**Best Director**: **Wojciech Smarzowski – Home Sweet Home**‡; Agnieszka Holland – Franz; Emi Buchwald – No Ghosts on Good Street; Maciej Sobieszczański – Brother; Piotr Domalewski – The Altar Boys
**Best Actor**: **Tomasz Schuchardt – Home Sweet Home as Grzesiek Nowak**‡; Bartłomiej Deklewa – No Ghosts on Good Street as Benek; Eryk Kulm – Chopin, a Sonata in Paris as Frédéric Chopin; Filip Wiłkomirski – Brother as Dawid Kamiński; Idan Weiss – Franz as Franz Kafka	**Best Actress**: **Agata Turkot – Home Sweet Home as Gośka Nowak**‡; Agnieszka Grochowska – Brother as Agnieszka; Izabela Kuna – The In-Laws 3 as Wanda Chrapek; Izabella Dudziak – No Ghosts on Good Street as Nastka; Matylda Giegżno – Photosensitive as Agata
**Best Supporting Actor**: **Andrzej Konopka – LARP: Love, Trolls and Other Quests as Hubert Raban**‡; Andrzej Konopka – Home Sweet Home as Zibi; Jacek Braciak – Brother as Marcel; Julian Świeżewski – Brother as Konrad Górecki; Sławomir Orzechowski – The Altar Boys as the priest	**Best Supporting Actress**: **Karolina Rzepa – No Ghosts on Good Street as Jana**‡; Agata Kulesza – Home Sweet Home as Jolka; Karolina Gruszka – Chopin, a Sonata in Paris as Delfina Potocka; Maria Sobocińska – Home Sweet Home as Magda; Sandra Korzeniak – Franz as Julie Kafka
**Best Screenplay**: **The Altar Boys – Piotr Domalewski**‡; Brother – Grzegorz Puda and Maciej Sobieszczański; Franz – Marek Epstein; Home Sweet Home – Wojciech Smarzowski; No Ghosts on Good Street – Emi Buchwald and Karol Marczak	**Best Cinematography**: **Franz – Tomasz Naumiuk**‡; The Altar Boys – Piotr Sobociński Jr.; Brother – Jolanta Dylewska; Chopin, a Sonata in Paris – Michał Sobociński; Pani od polskiego – Arkadiusz Tomiak
**Best Production Design**: **Chopin, a Sonata in Paris – Katarzyna Sobańska and Marcel Sławiński**‡; Franz – Henrich Boráros; Home Sweet Home – Joanna Macha; Operation Pope – Wojciech Żogała; Pani od polskiego – Wojciech Żogała	**Best Makeup and Hairstyling**: **Chopin, a Sonata in Paris – Dariusz Krysiak**‡; Home Sweet Home – Liliana Gałązka; LARP: Love, Trolls and Other Quests – Magdalena Tarka; Life for Beginners – Agnieszka Jońca; Operation Pope – Agnieszka Hdoowana; The Ugly Stepsister – Anne Cathrine Sauerberg and Thomas Foldberg
**Best Costume Design**: **Chopin, a Sonata in Paris – Magdalena Biedrzycka and Justyna Stolarz**‡; Franz – Michaela Horackova; LARP: Love, Trolls and Other Quests – Wiola Uliasz; Operation Pope – Małgorzata Moskwa-Braszka; Sanatorium Under the Sign of the Hourglass – Dorota Roqueplo	**Best Film Score**: **Home Sweet Home – Mikołaj Trzaska**‡; The Altar Boys – Wojtek Urbański; Brother – Antoni Łazarkiewicz; Child of Dust – Joaquin Garcia; Dreams Full of Smoke – Marcin Lenarczyk; Franz – Mary Komasa and Antoni Łazarkiewicz; Mensch – Michał Lorenc; No Ghosts on Good Street – Katarzyna Gawlik and Jerzy Rogiewicz; Operation Pope – Daniel Bloom
**Best Sound**: **Chopin, a Sonata in Paris – Marcin Matlak, Marcin Kasiński, and Filip Krzemień**‡; The Altar Boys – Jerzy Murawski and Wojciech Mielimąka; Home Sweet Home – Radosław Ochnio and Marta Weronika Werońska; No Ghosts on Good Street – Aleksandra Landsman; Pani od polskiego – Krzysztof Jastrząb	**Best Editing**: **Trains – Rafał Listopad**‡; The Altar Boys – Agnieszka Glińska; Chopin, a Sonata in Paris – Bartłomiej Piasek and Piotr Wójcik; Franz – Pavel Hrdlička; Home Sweet Home – Krzysztof Komander; No Ghosts on Good Street – Anna Łuka
**Best Documentary**: **Trains – Directed by Maciej Drygas**‡; Child of Dust – Directed by Weronika Mliczewska; The Guest – Directed by Zvika Gregory Portnoy and Zuzanna Solakiewicz; Letters from Wolf Street – Directed by Arjun Talwar; Silver – Directed by Natalia Koniarz	**Discovery of the Year**: **Emi Buchwald – No Ghosts on Good Street (Directing)**‡; Filip Wiłkomirski – Brother (Acting); Iga Lis – Bałtyk (Directing); Kordian Kądziela – LARP: Love, Trolls and Other Quests (Directing); Tobiasz Wajda – The Altar Boys (Acting)
**Audience Award**: **The Altar Boys – Directed by Piotr Domalewski**‡; Brother – Directed by Maciej Sobieszczański; Franz – Directed by Agnieszka Holland; Home Sweet Home – Directed by Wojciech Smarzowski; No Ghosts on Good Street – Directed by Emi Buchwald	**Life Achievement Award**: **Krystyna Janda**

=== Films with multiple nominations and awards ===
Films that received multiple nominations
Nominations	Film
13	Home Sweet Home
10	Brother
10	Franz
10	No Ghosts on Good Street
9	The Altar Boys
8	Chopin, a Sonata in Paris
4	LARP: Love, Trolls and Other Quests
4	Operation Pope
3	Pani od polskiego
2	Child of Dust
2	Trains

Films that received multiple awards
Awards	Film
5	Home Sweet Home
4	Chopin, a Sonata in Paris
2	No Ghosts on Good Street
2	Trains
