= Polish Academy Award for Best Screenplay =

Annual film award category

The Polish Academy Award for Best Film Screenplay is an annual award given to the best Polish screenplay of the year.

== Winners and nominees ==
Year	Movie title	Writer
1999	Zabić Sekala	Jiří Křižan
1999	Historia kina w Popielawach	Jan Jakub Kolski
1999	Kroniki domowe	Leszek Wosiewicz
1999	Nic	Dorota Kędzierzawska
1999	U Pana Boga za piecem	Tadeusz Chmielewski
1999	Złote runo	Andrzej Kondratiuk
2000	Dług	Krzysztof Krauze and Jerzy Morawski
2000	Fuks	Robert Brutter and Maciej Dutkiewicz
2000	Pan Tadeusz	Andrzej Wajda
2000	Tydzień z życia mężczyzny	Jerzy Stuhr
2000	Wojaczek	Lech Majewski and Maciej Melecki
2001	Życie jako śmiertelna choroba przenoszona drogą płciową	Krzysztof Zanussi
2001	Córy szczęścia	Maciej Karpiński and Márta Mészáros
2001	Daleko od okna	Cezary Harasimowicz
2001	Duże zwierzę	Krzysztof Kieślowski
2001	Prymas - trzy lata z tysiąca	Jan Purzycki
2002	Cześć Tereska	Jacek Wyszomirski
2002	Angelus	Lech Majewski, Ireneusz Siwiński and Bronisław Maj
2002	Boże skrawki	Jerzy Bogajewicz
2002	Człowiek wózków	Mariusz Malec
2002	Stacja	Piotr Wereśniak
2002	Weiser	Wojciech Marczewski
2003	Dzień Świra	Marek Koterski
2003	Edi	Wojciech Lepianka and Piotr Trzaskalski
2003	Głośniej od bomb	Przemysław Wojcieszek
2003	Pianista	Ronald Harwood
2003	Tam i z powrotem	Maciej Świerkocki and Anna Płażewska
2004	Zmruż oczy	Andrzej Jakimowski
2004	Warszawa	Dariusz Gajewski and Mateusz Bednarkiewicz
2004	Żurek	Ryszard Brylski
2005	Wesele	Wojciech Smarzowski
2005	Mój Nikifor	Krzysztof Krauze and Joanna Kos-Krauze
2005	Pręgi	Wojciech Kuczok
2005	Vinci	Juliusz Machulski
2006	Komornik	Grzegorz Łoszewski
2006	Jestem	Dorota Kędzierzawska
2006	Persona non grata	Krzysztof Zanussi
2007	Wszyscy jesteśmy Chrystusami	Marek Koterski
2007	Plac Zbawiciela	Krzysztof Krauze and Joanna Kos-Krauze
2007	Statyści	Jarosław Sokół
2008	Parę osób, mały czas	Andrzej Barański
2008	Pora umierać	Dorota Kędzierzawska
2008	Sztuczki	Andrzej Jakimowski
2009	Mała Moskwa	Waldemar Krzystek
2009	33 sceny z życia	Małgorzata Szumowska
2009	Cztery noce z Anną	Ewa Piaskowska and Jerzy Skolimowski
2010	Rewers	Andrzej Bart
2010	Dom zły	Łukasz Kośmicki and Wojciech Smarzowski
2010	Generał Nil	Ryszard Bugajski and Krzysztof Łukaszewicz
2011	Wszystko, co kocham	Jacek Borcuch
2011	Essential Killing	Ewa Piaskowska and Jerzy Skolimowski
2011	Joanna	Feliks Falk
2012	Róża	Michał Szczerbic
2012	Sala samobójców	Jan Komasa
2012	W ciemności	David F. Shamoon
2012	Wymyk	Janusz Margański and Grzegorz Zgliński
2013	Drogówka	Wojciech Smarzowski
2013	Jesteś Bogiem	Maciej Pisuk
2013	Obława	Marcin Krzyształowicz
2013	Rzeź	Yasmina Reza and Roman Polański
2014	Chce się żyć	Maciej Pieprzyca
2014	Ida	Paweł Pawlikowski and Rebecca Lenkiewicz
2014	Imagine	Andrzej Jakimowski
2015	Bogowie	Krzysztof Rak
2015	Jack Strong	Władysław Pasikowski
2015	Pod Mocnym Aniołem	Wojciech Smarzowski
2016	Moje córki krowy	Kinga Dębska
2016	11 minut	Jerzy Skolimowski
2016	Body/Ciało	Michał Englert and Małgorzata Szumowska
2017	Ostatnia rodzina	Robert Bolesto
2017	Jestem mordercą	Maciej Piperzyca
2017	Wołyń	Wojciech Smarzowski
2018	Cicha noc	Piotr Domalewski
2018	Pokot	Olga Tokarczuk and Agnieszka Holland
2018	Sztuka kochania. Historia Michaliny Wisłockiej	Krzysztof Rak
2019	Zimna wojna	Paweł Pawlikowski and Janusz Głowacki
2019	7 uczuć	Marek Koterski
2019	Kler	Wojciech Smarzowski and Wojciech Rzehak
2020	Boże ciało	Mateusz Pacewicz
2020	Ikar. Legenda Mietka Kosza	Maciej Pieprzyca
2020	Mowa ptaków	Andrzej Żuławski
2020	Obywatel Jones	Andrea Chalupa
2020	Pan T.	Marcin Kryształowicz and Andrzej Gołda
2021	Zabij to i wyjedź z tego miasta	Mariusz Wilczyński
2021	25 lat niewinności. Sprawa Tomka Komendy	Andrzej Gołda
2021	Jak najdalej stąd	Piotr Domalewski
2021	Sala samobójców. Hejter	Mateusz Pacewicz
2021	Szarlatan	Marek Epstein
2022	Aida	Jasmila Žbanić
2022	Moje wspaniałe życie	Łukasz Grzegorzek
2022	Wesele	Wojciech Smarzowski
2022	Wszystkie nasze strachy	Łukasz Ronduda, Michał Oleszczyk and Katarzyna Sarnowska
2022	Żeby nie było śladów	Kaja Krawczyk-Wnuk
2023	IO	Jerzy Skolimowski and Ewa Piaskowska
2023	Chleb i sól	Damian Kocur
2023	Johnny	Maciej Kraszewski
2023	Śubuk	Jacek Lusiński and Szymon Augustyniak
2023	Inni ludzie	Aleksandra Terpińska
2023	Kobieta na dachu	Anna Jadowska
2024	Kos	Michał A. Zieliński
2024	Doppelgänger. Sobowtór	Andrzej Gołda
2024	Filip	Michał Kwieciński and Michał Matejkiewicz
2024	Tyle co nic	Grzegorz Dębowski
2024	Zielona granica	Maciej Pisiuk, Gabriela Łazarkiewicz-Sieczko and Agnieszka Holland
2025	Dziewczyna z igłą	Line Langebek Knudsen and Magnus von Horn
2025	Biała odwaga	Łukasz M. Maciejewski and Marcin Koszałka
2025	Kulej. Dwie strony medalu	Rafał Lipski and Xawery Żuławski
2025	Minghun	Grzegorz Łoszewski
2025	Prawdziwy ból	Jesse Eisenberg
2025	Strefa interesów	Jonathan Glazer
2026	The Altar Boys	Piotr Domalewski
2026	Brother	Grzegorz Puda and Maciej Sobieszczański
2026	Franz	Marek Epstein
2026	Home Sweet Home	Wojciech Smarzowski
2026	No Ghosts on Good Street	Emi Buchwald and Karol Marczak
