= Łukasz Karwowski =

Polish film director, screenwriter and producer

Łukasz Karwowski (born 30 December 1965 in Toruń) is a Polish film director, screenwriter and producer.

== Early and personal life ==
Karwowski grew up in Toruń, Poland, in the turbulent years of Solidarity and the struggle against the martial law. His father spent time in prison for his anti-communist activity. He lives in Warsaw, married to Weronika Karwowska and has six children: Franciszek, Roch, Mia, Leon, Tymon and Iwo.

== Education ==
Karwowski studied Polish philology at the Nicolaus Copernicus University in Toruń. He then obtained a degree from the Film and Television Directing Department in the world-renowned National Film School in Lodz, where he was taught by Wojciech Jerzy Has (Winner of Cannes Grand Jury Award for The Hourglass Sanatorium and nominee for several more). In 1989 he studied directing at the National Film and Television School in the UK. In the same year in Belgrade, he was elected for a film masterclass by Istvan Szabo. As a student, he already started gaining accolades for his work. The Möbius Strip (1989), won best short film and best young filmmaker of the year in Edinburgh International Film Festival, best original screenplay in Nîmes Short films festival, main prize in The Tel Aviv International Student Film Festival, as well as being nominated for the Student Academy Awards (AKA Student's Oscar).

== Career ==
Karwowski says his life view and creative style were shaped by his upbringing in Communist Poland. His early films were influenced by his teacher Wojciech Jerzy Has, being more abstract with an inner world of reason and aesthetics, and later shifted to gritty realism and dramatic plots with powerful acting roles.

In 1992, he made his debut November, a feature length Polish-French co-production thriller with cinematography by Paweł Edelman (The Pianist, European Film Award for Best Cinematographer, César Award for Best Cinematography, Academy Award and a BAFTA nominations and many more). For it, he received the Polish Cultural Foundation Award at the Polish Gdynia Film Festival (1992).

In the 1990s, he moved to France, where with the production company he founded Moon Movie, he directed over 150 commercials (Daewoo, Danone, Johnson & Johnson, LOT, MK Cafe). He also spent some time in Los Angeles. Later, with his production company of 20 years Zoomedia, he has produced over 120 and directed over 300 television commercials - initially in France and then in Poland. His commercials have gone to receive many awards at festivals.

In 2006, he returned to his true passion, feature films. His South by North (2006), a drama with Borys Szyc (Cold War), Agnieszka Grochowska and Robert Więckiewicz, won the huge achievement of opening the 22nd Warsaw Film Festival, and went on to win several awards. South by North was also the first Polish film made entirely with no public funding to achieve market success.

Another film, "Expecting Love" (2008), with Mała wielka miłość and cinematography by Arkadiusz Tomiak, was the first Polish production to be co-produced in the U.S. with a full production team. It featured a mixed Polish-American cast (including Agnieszka Grochowska, Joshua Leonard (star of Blair Witch Project), Agata Kulesza (Oscar-winning Ida), Mikolaj Grabowski, Marcin Bosak, Robert Forster (Oscar nominated for Jackie Brown). The compelling love story between an American lawyer and a Polish student, is still on broadcast in many TV stations, and was also adapted to a four-part TV series.

A project close to Karwowski's heart is his 2009 documentary Doctor, about his beloved grandfather, Otton Karwowski, who was a legendary rural doctor.

Currently, Karwowski is working (producer, director and screenwriter) on two feature films: One Soul (Jedna Dusza) starring Dawid Ogrodnik and Malgorzata Gorol. The cinematographer is Adam Bajerski, and Weronika Karwowska is set designer. The film is distributed by Kino Świat. The second film in production is a psychological drama, The Truth (Prawda) with Natalia Jedrus, Jasmina Polak and [Patryk Michalak Patryk Michalak].

Another project, currently in Post-Production, which is very close to Karwowski's heart, is the film Two Sisters (Dwie Siostry, 2023), almost entirely shot near the frontline in eastern Ukraine (Bucha or Kharkiv), and tells the story of two estranged sisters who reunite for a journey to save their injured father. The production has been lucky enough to have some great Ukrainian actors such as Irma Vitovska, Vitalina Bibliv, Maryna Koshkina or Oleksandr Rudynskyi, As well as Polish actors Karolina Rzepa and Diana Zamojska.

== Awards and nominations ==
International Film Festival Tofifest - The Flisak Award (South by North)

Cieszyn Film Festival - The Golden Horseshoe for Best Feature Film (South by North)

Gdynia Film Festival - The Polish Culture Foundation Award (November)

Tokyo International Film Festival - The Jury Prize (Playing from the plate)

Tel Aviv International Student Film Festival – Main Award (Mobius Ribbon)

Edinburgh International Film Festival – Best short film and young filmmaker of the year award (Mobius Ribbon)

Student Academy Award (so-called student's Oscar) - nomination (Mobius Ribbon)

Film School Festival in Nîmes - screenplay award (Mobius Ribbon)

== Filmography ==
Director

- L'amour (L'amour – czyli życie jest trudne, 1986)
- The Passage (Przejście, 1987)
- Nieroby (1987)
- The woman who waits (Kobieta, która czeka, 1987)
- Carousel, carousel... (Karuzela, karuzela..., 1987)
- It's good (Jest dobrze, 1987)
- Mobius Ribbon (Wstęga Möbiusa,1988)
- The Registration (Rejestracja, 1988)
- The Fears (Strachy, 1989)
- Maria (1990)
- Sal (1991)
- November (1992)
- South by North (2006)
- The Baby (Dziecko, 2007)
- Expecting Love (Mala wielka milosc, 2008)
- Doctor (Doktor, 2009)
- Kac Wawa (2012)
- Son of the city (Syn miasta, 2013)
- Torun - The European Capital of Culture (2016)
- TZMO Global (2018)
- TZMO Global (2022)
- The Truth (Prawda, 2022)
- One Soul (Jedna Dusza, 2023)
- Two Sisters (Dwie Siostry, 2023)

Screenwriter

- Carousel, carousel... (Karuzela, karuzela..., 1987)
- Mobius Ribbon (Wstęga Möbiusa,1988)
- Registration (Rejestracja, 1988)
- Maria (1990)
- November (1992)
- South by North (2006)
- Expecting Love (Mala wielka milosc, 2008)
- Doctor (Doktor, 2009)
- Torun - The European Capital of Culture (2016)
- TZMO Global (2018)
- TZMO Global (2022)
- The Truth (Prawda, 2022)
- One Soul (Jedna Dusza, 2023)
- Two Sisters (Dwie Siostry, 2023)

Producer

- Playing from the plate (Grający z talerza, 1995)
- South by North (2006)
- Torun - The European Capital of Culture (2016)
- TZMO Global (2018)
- TZMO Global (2022)
- The Truth (Prawda, 2022)
- One Soul (Jedna Dusza, 2023)
- Two Sisters (Dwie Siostry, 2023)
