= Filip Wiłkomirski =

Polish judoka and actor (born 2010)

- Born: 2010 (age 15–16)
- Occupations: Judoka, actor

Filip Wiłkomirski (born 2010) is a judoka and actor.

== Biography ==
The son of Krzysztof Wiłkomirski and grandson of Bogusław Wiłkomirski. He started training judo at the age of three. He became a player of the Hato Judo Warsaw club. He became Polish Junior Champion in judo in 2023.

He played the role of Dawid Kamiński in the feature film Brat directed by Maciej Sobieszczański. At the 50th Polish Feature Film Festival in Gdynia in 2025, he won the Award for Professional Acting Debut for his role in this film. At the 2026 Polish Film Awards he was nominated in the categories Best Actor and Discovery of the Year. At the 2026 Polish Film Festival in Washington he was awarded as Best Actor. He received a special award for a debuting filmmaker at the Tarnów Film Award and was nominated to Pulsary Award for acting debut (both 2026).

== Filmography ==
- Brat (2024)
- Przez ścianę (2026)
