= TISFF =

TISFF may refer to:

- Tehran International Short Film Festival
- Tel Aviv International Student Film Festival
