= The Altar Boys (film) =

- Directed by: Piotr Domalewski
- Written by: Piotr Domalewski
- Produced by: Leszek Bodzak, Aneta Hickinbotham, Piotr Walter, Jarosław Jakubiec
- Starring: Tobiasz Wajda, Bruno Błach-Baar, Mikołaj Juszczyk, Filip Juszczyk
- Cinematography: Piotr Sobociński jr.
- Edited by: Agnieszka Glińska
- Music by: Dyspensa, Wojciech Urbański
- Release date: 2025
- Country: Poland
- Language: Polish

The Altar Boys (Polish: Ministranci) is a 2025 film written and directed by Piotr Domalewski.

== Cast ==
- Tobiasz Wajda as Filip Grabowski
- Bruno Błach-Baar as Gustaw “Gucci”
- Mikołaj Juszczyk as “Kurczak” (“Chicken”)
- Filip Juszczyk as “Mały Kurczak” (“Little Chicken”)
- Daria Kalinchuk as Dominika
- Sławomir Orzechowski as parish priest
- Tomasz Schuchardt jako retreat leader
- Kamila Urzędowska as Joanna, mother of Filip
- Artur Paczesny as father of Dominika
- Katarzyna Pietruska as mother of Dominika
- Dominika Bednarczyk as mother of “Gucci”
- Michał Majnicz as father of “Gucci”
- Karolina Adamczyk as mother of “Kurczaki” (“Chickens”)
- Krzysztof Ogłoza jako father of “Kurczaki” (“Chickens”)

== Accolades ==
The Altar Boys won Golden Lions (film award) at the Polish Film Festival in Gdynia.

At the 2026 Polish Film Awards the film was nominated in the categories: Best Film, Best Director (Piotr Domalewski), Best Supporting Actor (Sławomir Orzechowski), Best Cinematography (Piotr Sobociński Jr.), Best Film Score (Wojtek Urbański), Best Sound (Jerzy Murawski and Wojciech Mielimąka), Best Editing (Agnieszka Glińska) and Discovery of the Year (Tobiasz Wajda); it received awards for Best Screenplay (Domalewski) and the Audience Award.
