= Angel Award =

Angel Award may refer to:

- Anděl Awards (Angel Award for Czech music)
- Angel Award (Monaco International Film Festival)
- Angel Award (Excellence in Media)
- Angel Award (International Angel Investors), by the International Angel Investors organization for venture-capital activities
- Golden Angel Award of the Tofifest held annually in Toruń, Poland
