= Brother (2024 Polish film) =

- Directed by: Maciej Sobieszczański
- Written by: Maciej Sobieszczański, Grzegorz Puda
- Starring: Filip Wiłkomirski, Tytus Szymczuk, Agnieszka Grochowska
- Cinematography: Jolanta Dylewska
- Edited by: Rafał Listopad
- Music by: Antoni Komasa-Łazarkiewicz
- Release date: 2024
- Running time: 100 minutes
- Country: Poland
- Language: Polish

Brother (Polish: Brat) is a 2024 film directed by Maciej Sobieszczański, written by Sobieszczański and Grzegorz Puda. The film was shot in Gdańsk and Żyrardów.

== Cast ==
- Filip Wiłkomirski as Dawid Kamiński
- Tytus Szymczuk as Michał Kamiński, brother of Dawid
- Agnieszka Grochowska as Agnieszka, mother of Dawid and Michał
- Julian Świeżewski as Konrad Górecki, Dawid's coach
- Jacek Braciak as Marcel, father of Dawid and Michał
- Jakub Kamieński as prisoner
- Julian Zbiróg as Sławek
- Kamil Panas as colleague of Sławek

== Accolades ==
For his role as Dawid, Filip Wiłkomirski received the Award for Best Acting Debut at the 50th Polish Film Festival in Gdynia in 2025. At the 2025 Warsaw Film Festival, the film received the Ecumenical Jury Award.

At the 2026 Polish Film Awards the film was nominated in the categories Best Film, Best Director (Maciej Sobieszczański), Best Actor and Discovery of the Year (Filip Wiłkomirski), Best Actress (Agnieszka Grochowska), Best Supporting Actor (Jacek Braciak, Julian Świeżewski), Best Screenplay (Maciej Sobieszczański, Grzegorz Puda), Best Cinematography (Jolanta Dylewska) and Best Film Score (Antoni Komasa-Łazarkiewicz). At the 2026 Polish Film Festival in Washington Filip Wiłkomirski was awarded as Best Actor. Jolanta Dylewska was nominated to PSC Award for cinematography for Brat. The film received a special award and a special award for the debuting filmmaker at the Tarnów Film Award (2026).
