= Cicha noc =

2017 Polish film by Piotr Domalewski

- Directed by: Piotr Domalewski
- Written by: Piotr Domalewski
- Produced by: Jacek Bromski; Jerzy Kapuściński; Ewa Jastrzębska
- Starring: Dawid Ogrodnik; Tomasz Ziętek; Arkadiusz Jakubik
- Cinematography: Piotr Sobociński jr.
- Edited by: Leszek Starzyński
- Music by: Wacław Zimpel
- Release date: 2017
- Running time: 97 minutes
- Country: Poland
- Language: Polish

Cicha noc is a 2017 Polish film written and directed by Piotr Domalewski. It won Golden Lions award at the Polish Film Festival in Gdynia in 2017.

== Cast ==
- Dawid Ogrodnik as Adam
- Tomasz Ziętek as Paweł, Adam's brother
- Arkadiusz Jakubik as Zbigniew, Adam's father
- Agnieszka Suchora as Teresa, Adam's mother
- Amelia Tyszkiewicz as Kasia, Adam's younger sister
- Maria Dębska as Jolka, Adam's older sister
- Tomasz Schuchardt as Marcin, Jolka's husband
- Paweł Nowisz as Adam's grandfather
- Elżbieta Kępińska as Adam's grandmother
- Adam Cywka as Adam's uncle
- Jowita Budnik as Basia, Adam's ount
- Mateusz Więcławek as Jacek, Adam's cousin
- Katarzyna Domalewska as Ania, Adam's cousin
- Magdalena Żak as Gośka, Adam's cousin
- Milena Staszuk as Aśka, Adam's fiancée
