= Karolina Rzepa =

Polish actress (born 1992)

- Born: 1992 (age 33–34)
- Occupation: actress

Karolina Rzepa (born 1992) is an actress.

== Biography ==
She was elected a member of the European Film Academy.

== Awards ==
For her role in No Ghosts on Good Street she received award for best actress at the 2025 Polish Film Festival, 2026 Polish Film Award for best supporting actress and was nominated for Zbyszek Cybulski Award.
