= Kacper Fertacz =

Cinematographer (born 1985)

- Born: 30 September 1985 (age 40); Koszalin
- Occupation: Cinematographer

Kacper Fertacz (born 30 September 1985) is a cinematographer.

== Biography ==
He graduated in cinematography from the Katowice Film School. He became a member of Polish Society of Cinematographers.

== Filmography ==
- Hardkor Disko (2014)
- The Last Family (2016)
- Tarapaty (2017)
- Leave No Traces (2021)
- Minghun (2023)
- The Eastern Gate (2025; TV series)
- Teściowie 3 (2025)

Source.

== Accolades ==
He was nominated to Orzeł (Polish Film Award) for best cinematography for The Last Family in 2017, for Leave No Traces in 2022 and for Minghun in 2025.
