= Sara Johnsen =

Norwegian film director and author

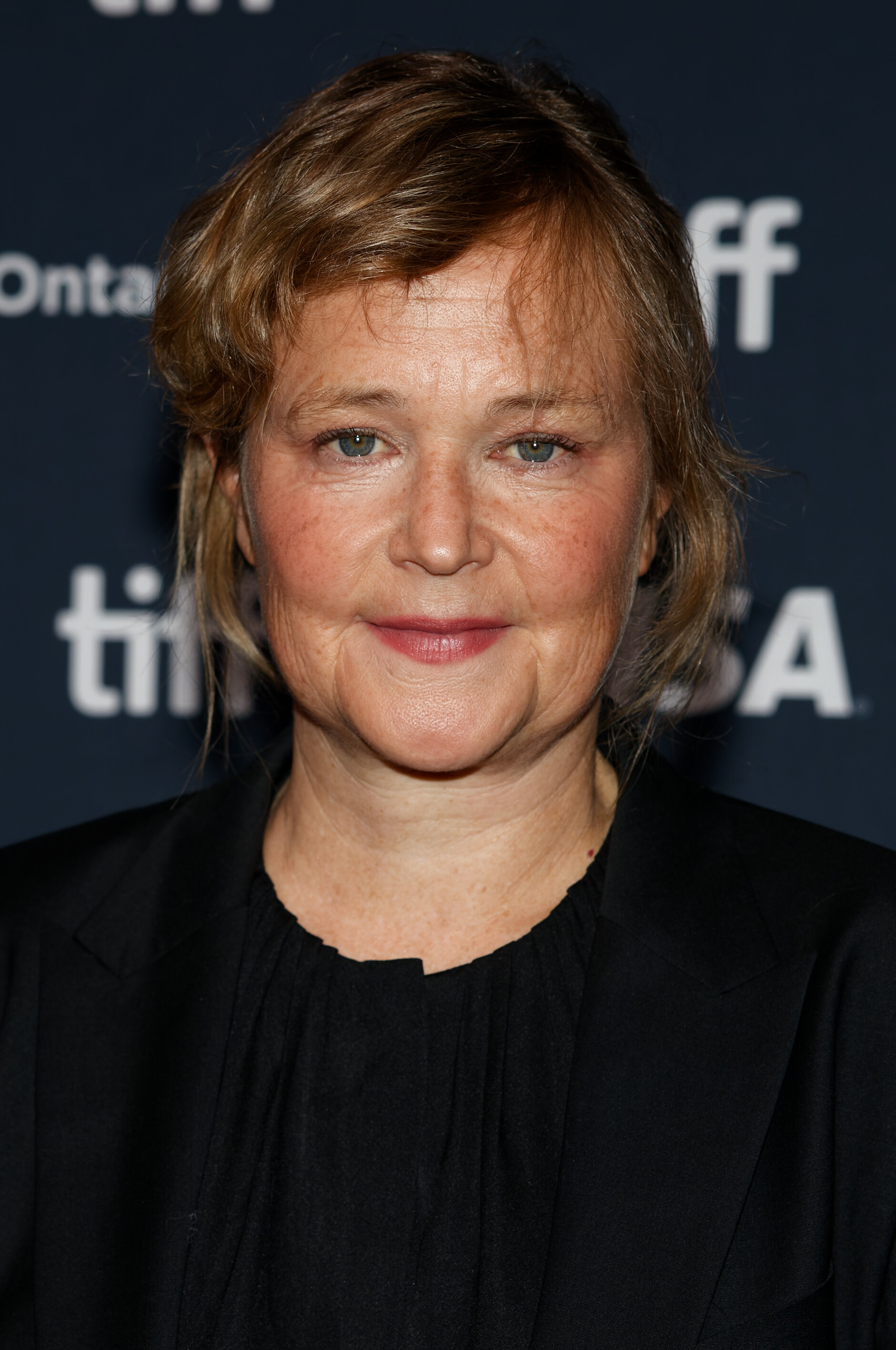
- Born: 4 March 1970 (age 56); Oslo, Norway
- Occupations: Author, Film director
- Years active: 2002-present

Sara Johnsen (born 4 March 1970) is a Norwegian film director and author.

== Career ==
Johnsen's first feature film Kissed by Winter was nominated for the 2005 Nordic Council Film Prize. Johnsen was an additional writer on the first series of the television series Occupied (2015). In 2020, she created and wrote the series 22 juli about the Utoya mass shooting with her husband Pål Sletaune. At the Göteborg Film Festival she was awarded the 2020 Nordic TV Drama Screenplay Award for her work on 22 juli. She was awarded the Fritt Ord Honorary Award in 2020, along with Pål Sletaune.

Johnsen has written the novels White Man and He Knows Something She Can Try.

== Selected filmography ==
Film
Year	Title	Notes
2005	Kissed by Winter	
2009	Upperdog	
2012	All That Matters Is Past	

== Awards ==
- The Kanon Award (2006)
- Amanda Award (2010)
- Fritt Ord Honorary Award (2020)
