= Tobiasz Wajda =

Polish actor

Tobiasz Wajda (born 2010) is an actor.

== Biography ==
Son of Katarzyna Wajda, great-grandson of Leszek Wajda; brother of Tadeusz and Wawrzyniec.

He played Filip in The Altar Boys, the role that earned him 2026 nomination to Polish Academy Award for Discovery of the Year, Rising Star Award in the Polish Film Competition at the Off Camera Festival and nomination for Pulsary Award for best acting debut.
