= Mary Komasa =

Polish musician (born 1985)

- Born: 1985 (age 40–41)
- Occupations: Singer, songwriter, composer

Mary Komasa (born 1985) is a Polish singer, lyricist and music composer who was also a model.

== Biography ==
Daughter of singer and music consultant Gina Komasa and actor Wiesław Komasa, sister of director Jan Komasa, singer Szymon Komasa and Zofia Komasa.

== Discography ==
- Mary Komasa (2015)
- Disarm (album) (2019)

== Filmography ==
Source.

- Śleboda (2024)
- Treasure (2024)
- Franz (2025)
- Ołowiane dzieci (2026)
- Through the Wall (2026)

== Accolades ==
- Nomination to Fryderyki for Phonographic Debut of the Year for Mary Komasa (2016)
- Nomination to Fryderyki for Alternative Album of the Year for Disarm (album) (2020)
- 2025 Czech Lion Awards: nomination in Best Music for Franz
- 2026 Polish Film Awards: nomination in Best Film Score for Franz
