= Upperdog =

- Directed by: Sara Johnsen
- Written by: Sara Johnsen
- Produced by: Dirk Decker; Christian Fredrik Martin; Asle Vatn
- Starring: Hermann Sabado; Agnieszka Grochowska
- Cinematography: John Andreas Andersen
- Edited by: Zaklina Stojcevska
- Music by: Marcus Paus
- Release date: 23 August 2009
- Running time: 100 minutes
- Country: Norway
- Language: Norwegian

Upperdog is a 2009 Norwegian comedy film directed by Sara Johnsen.

== Cast ==
- Hermann Sabado as Axel
- Agnieszka Grochowska as Maria
- Mads Sjøgård Pettersen as Per
- Bang Chau as Yanne
- Yngvild Støen Grotmol as Susanne Holmboe
- Ole Paus as Fredrik
- Birgitte Victoria Svendsen as Anne
- Kjersti Holmen as Else Beate
- Vidar Sandem as Hans Martin
- Tone Danielsen as Ruth
