= Tomasz Ziętek =

Polish actor

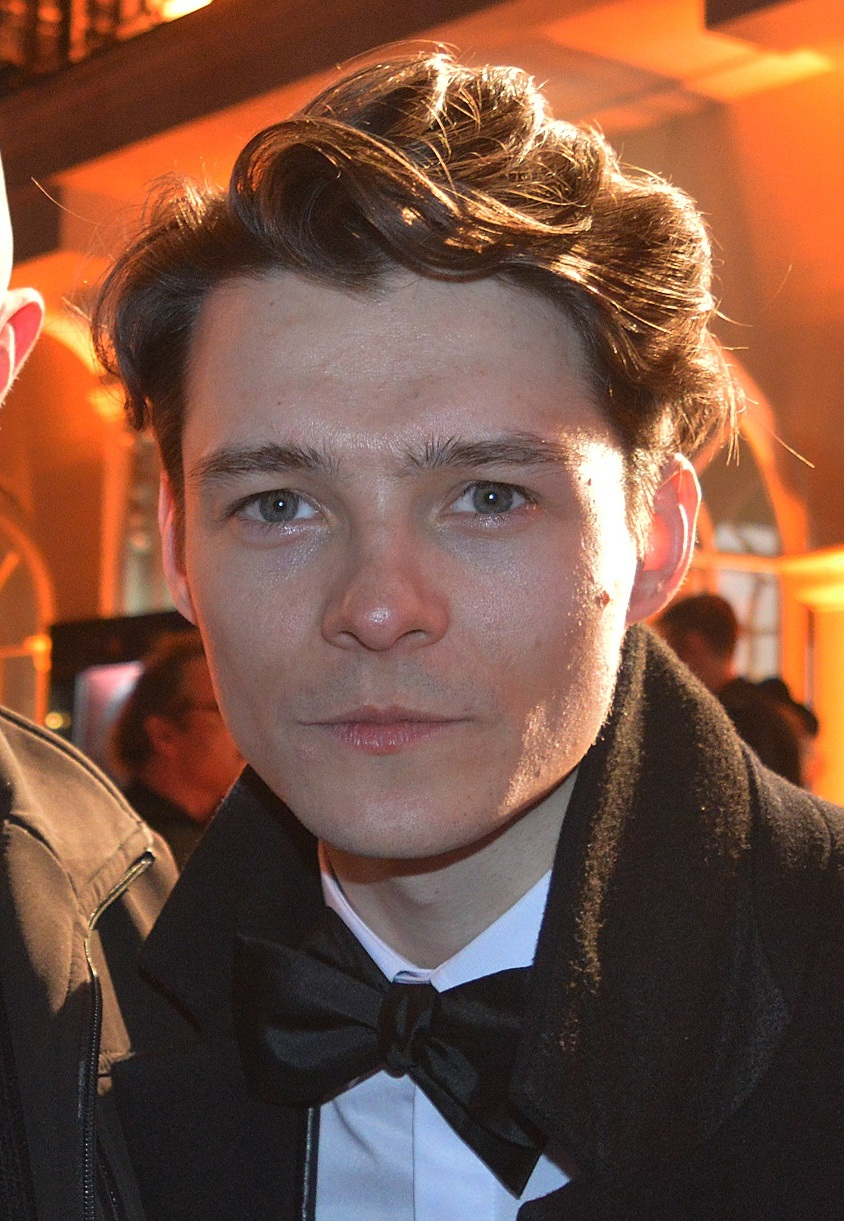
- Tomasz Ziętek in 2018
- Born: 28 June 1989 (age 37); Inowrocław, Poland
- Occupations: Actor, musician
- Years active: 2005–present

Tomasz Ziętek (born 28 June 1989) is a Polish film and theatre actor as well as musician and guitarist.

== Life and career ==
Ziętek was born on 28 June 1989 in Inowrocław. He graduated from the Bolesław III Wrymouth High School No. 1 in Słupsk, and completed studies at the Danuta Baduszkowa National Vocal and Drama School in Gdynia.

In 2007, Ziętek won the Grand Prix of the "Niemen Non Stop" Festival of Young Talents in Słupsk, Poland. In 2005, he made his theatre debut by performing in Betlejem Polskie ("Polish Bethlehem"), a play staged in the New Theatre in Słupsk. In 2011, he played his first major film role of Zbigniew Godlewski in Antoni Krauze's drama film Black Thursday, which recounts the events of the Polish protests of 1970. His other prominent roles include Jan Bytnar in Robert Gliński's 2014 war drama Stones for the Rampart and "Ronaldo" in Marcin Wrona's 2015 horror film Demon. For his roles in Cicha noc ("Silent Night"; 2017) and Jan Komasa's 2019 Academy-Award-nominated Corpus Christi, he received Polish Film Award nominations for Best Supporting Actor. In 2019, he appeared in BBC war drama TV series World on Fire written by Peter Bowker.

== Personal life ==
He is a vocalist and guitarist of the Tricity-based The Fruitcakes music band. He also created his solo music project The Ape Man Tales.

== Filmography ==
- 2011: Czarny czwartek (Black Thursday) as Zbigniew Godlewski
- 2013: Na dobre i na złe (TV series) as Jarek (episode 545)
- 2014: Kamienie na szaniec as Jan Bytnar
- 2014: Upload as Demolka Man
- 2015: Body as attorney's assistant
- 2015: Carte Blanche as Wojtek Madejski
- 2015: Pakt as a journalist
- 2015: Demon as Ronaldo
- 2016: Konwój as Feliks
- 2017: Żużel as Lowa
- 2017: Cicha noc as Paweł
- 2018: Kamerdyner as Max von Krauss
- 2019: Odwróceni. Ojcowie i córki (TV series) as Daniel
- 2019: Corpus Christi as Pinczer
- 2019: World on Fire (TV series) as Tomasz
- 2020: Tarapaty 2 as Karol Wróblewski
- 2021: Leave No Traces as Jurek Popiel
- 2021: Operation Hyacinth as Robert Mrozowski
- 2022: Below the Surface as Jan Grudziński

== See also ==
- Polish cinema
- Polish Film Awards
