= Szczyl =

Polish rapper (born 2000)

- Born: 9 March 2000 (age 26); Katowice
- Citizenship: Polish
- Occupation: Rapper

Szczyl, born Tymoteusz Rożynek (born 9 March 2000) is a rapper and actor.

== Biography ==
At the age of five he moved from Katowice to Gdynia. In 2021 he signed to Sony Music Entertainment Poland. He announced his third LP, Przedwczoraj, dzisiaj, pojutrze, in 2026.

== Discography ==
- Polska Floryda (2021)
- 8171 (2022), with Magiera (rapper)
- przedwczoraj, dzisiaj, pojutrze (2026)

== Filmography ==
- Nie ma duchów w mieszkaniu na Dobrej as Franek

== Accolades ==
In 2022 he received three nominations to Fryderyki for the best hip-hop album of the year, best recording debut of the year, and best artist of the year. In December 2022 he received Grzegorz Ciechowski Artistic Award of the City of Toruń. In 2023 he received Fryderyk for the best hip hop album of the year for 8171 (with Magiera) in 2023.
