= Shameless (2012 film) =

- Film poster
- Polish: Bez wstydu
- Directed by: Filip Marczewski
- Starring: Mateusz Kościukiewicz; Agnieszka Grochowska
- Edited by: Rafał Listopad
- Release date: 7 May 2012
- Running time: 81 minutes
- Country: Poland
- Language: Polish

Shameless (Polish: Bez wstydu) is a 2012 Polish drama film directed by Filip Marczewski.

== Synopsis ==
Tadek returns to his sister Anka's home to find solace and affection, and together they must find a way to break free from a shared and painful past.

== Cast ==
- Mateusz Kościukiewicz - Tadek
- Agnieszka Grochowska - Anka
- Anna Próchniak - Irmina
- Maciej Marczewski - Andrzej
- Paweł Królikowski - Member of Parliament
