= Operation Hyacinth (film) =

2021 film by Piotr Domalewski

- Polish: Hiacynt
- Directed by: Piotr Domalewski
- Written by: Marcin Ciastoń
- Starring: Tomasz Ziętek; Hubert Miłkowski; Marek Kalita
- Cinematography: Piotr Sobociński jr.
- Edited by: Agnieszka Glińska
- Production company: ShipsBoy
- Distributed by: Netflix
- Release date: 13 October 2021
- Running time: 112 minutes
- Country: Poland
- Language: Polish

Operation Hyacinth (Polish: Hiacynt) is a 2021 Polish film directed by Piotr Domalewski, written by Marcin Ciastoń and starring Tomasz Ziętek, Hubert Miłkowski, and Marek Kalita. The drama is based on the Operation Hyacinth (Polish: Akcja "Hiacynt"), which was an operation carried out by the Milicja Obywatelska from 1985 to 1987. Its purpose was to create a national database of all Polish homosexuals and people who were in touch with them. The film was well received by critics.

== Plot ==
Robert is in his mid-twenties and new to the Milicja Obywatelska (MO). His father Edward holds a senior position and is keen for his son to follow in his footsteps. Robert and his partner, Wojtek, investigate a case in which a serial murderer has been targeting gay men in Warsaw. Robert befriends a German-language student Arek in order to infiltrate the local gay scene for the investigation. As he does so, he discovers a tangle of lies, blackmail, and cover-ups.

== Cast ==
- Tomasz Ziętek as Robert Mrozowski
- Hubert Miłkowski as Arek
- Marek Kalita as Edward Mrozowski
- Adrianna Chlebicka as Halinka
- Tomasz Schuchardt as Wojtek
- Sebastian Stankiewicz as Maciek
- Jacek Poniedziałek as Dignitary
- Piotr Trojan as Kamil
- Agnieszka Suchora as Ewa Mrozowska
- Tomasz Włosok as Tadek Morawski
- Mirosław Zbrojewicz as Commander
- Andrzej Klak as Agent with a scar
- Adam Cywka as Professor Mettler
- Jakub Wieczorek as Sleuth

== Production ==
=== Direction and screenplay ===
Director Piotr Domalewski was born in 1983 and grew up in Łomża. After completing his secondary education, he enrolled at the Aleksander-Zelwerowicz Academy for Drama in Białystok and began his study of puppet shows. After his exams, he continued his education until 2009 at the Faculty for Drama at the AST National Academy of Theatre Arts in Kraków. As an actor, he appeared in the Wybrzeże Theatre and worked with directors such as Anna Augustynowicz, Grzegorz Wiśniewski and Ewelina Marciniak. At this time he shot the short film Stranger, an adaptation of Robert Musil's The Man Without Qualities. His feature film debut Silent Night (Polish: Cicha noc) received multiple awards including best film at the Polish Film Festival. Domalewski's second feature film I Never Cry (original title: Polish: Jak najdalej stąd; translates to: As Far Away From Here as Possible) premiered in September 2020.

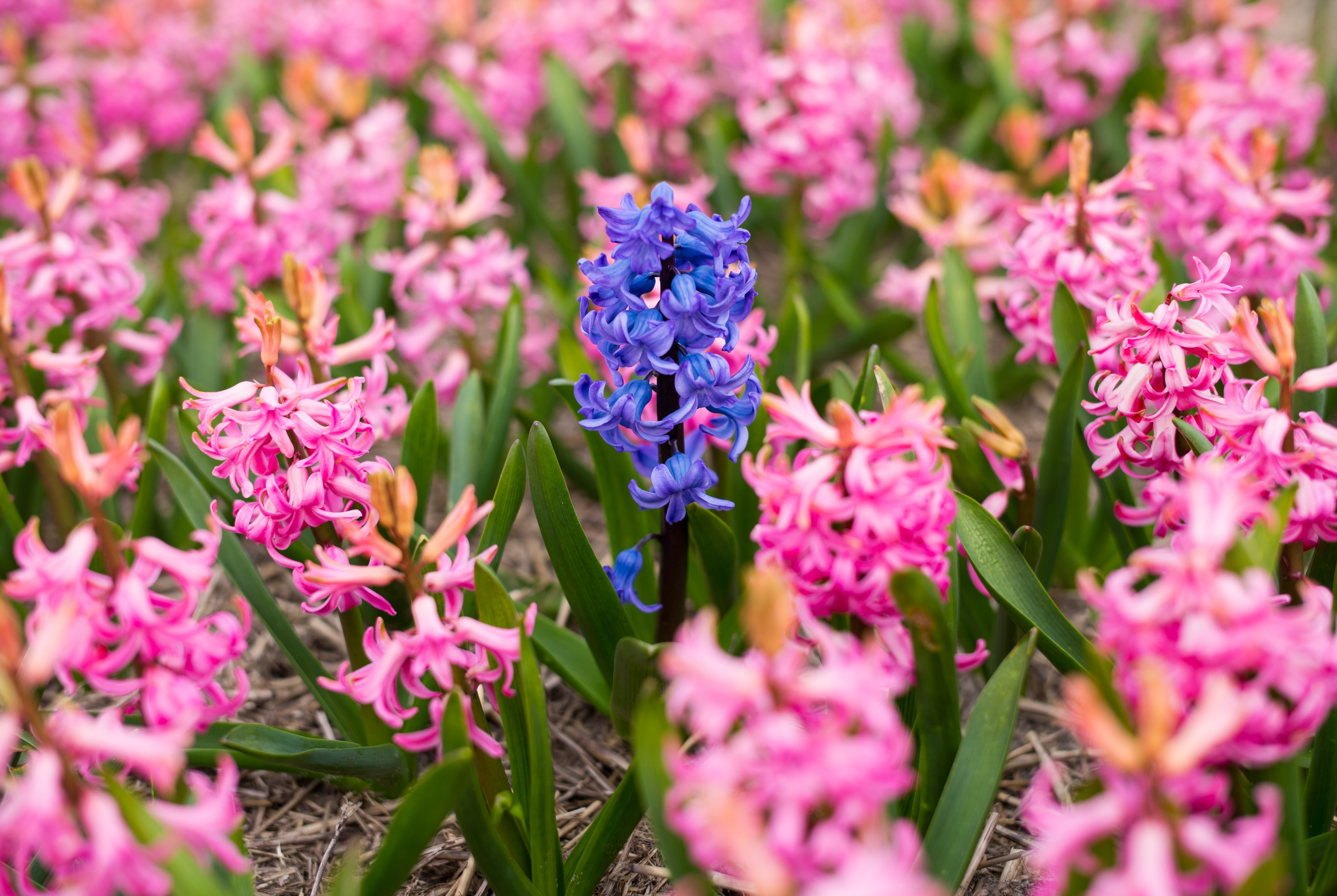
In 1980s Poland, hyacint was a derogatory term, similar to the English pansy, used to refer to homosexual men.

Marcin Ciastoń drew inspiration for the screenplay from Operation Hyacinth, an action undertaken by the Polish secret services in the 1980s. The operation targeted the country's gay community, and the material gathered was used to extort men and to enforce their cooperation. Launched under the pretext of tackling the AIDS epidemic and prostitution, Operation Hyacinth saw a significant number of homosexuals imprisoned, arrested, or otherwise persecuted.

== Reception ==
=== Accolades ===
| Year | Award/Festival | Recipient | Recipients |
|---|---|---|---|
| 2021 | Polish Film Festival | Screenplay Award | Martin Caken |
| 2021 | Polish Film Festival | Characterization Award | Daria Siejak |
| 2021 | Polish Film Festival | Golden Clapper (Radio Gdańsk award for the longest applauded film) | |
| 2021 | Zbigniew Cybulski Award | | Tomasz Ziętek (nominated) |
| 2021 | Camerimage | Golden Frog for the best Polish film | Piotr Sobocinski Jr., Piotr Domalewski |

== See also ==
- Cinema of Poland
- List of LGBTQ-related films
