= Kanon Award =

Annual Norwegian film award

The Kanon Award is one of the movie awards of Norwegian film festival Kosmorama. Every year during Kosmorama, the Kanon Award is given to a selected individual within a category. The categories include Best Actor, Best Director and Best Producer.

== Categories ==
Best Director

Best Producer

Best Main Actor

Best Supporting Actor

Best Cinematographer

Best Writer

Best Editing

Best Sound Design

Best Soundtrack

Best Innovation

People's Choice Award

== The Kanon Award 2005 ==
Best Director: Hans Petter Moland - The Beautiful Country

Best Writer: Aksel Hennie - Uno

Best Editing: Einar Egeland - Hawaii, Oslo

Best Cinematographer: John Andreas Andersen - Uno

Best Main Actor: Aksel Hennie - Uno

Best Supporting Actor: Stig Henrik Hoff - "Hawaii, Oslo"

Best Producer: Jørgen Storm Rosenberg - Uno

People's Choice Award: Uno

== The Kanon Award 2006 ==
Best Director: Sara Johnsen - Vinterkyss

Best Sound Design: Christian Schaanning - Naboer

Best Cinematographer: Odd Reinhard Nicolaisen - "Vinterkyss"

Best Soundtrack: Kristin Asbjørnsen - Factotum

Best Writer: Ståle Stein Berg and Sara Johnsen - "Vinterkyss"

Best Supporting Actor: Jan Sælid - Izzat

Best Editing: Zaklina Stojcevska - "Vinterkyss"

Best Main Actor: Helen Wikstvedt - 37 1/2

Best Producer: Christian Fredrik Martin and Asle Vatn - "Vinterkyss"

People's Choice Award: "Izzat"

== The Kanon Award 2007 ==
Best Director: Joachim Trier - Reprise

Best Producer: Martin Sundland and Magne Lyngner - Fritt Vilt

Best Main Actor: Trond Fausa Aurvåg - Den brysomme mannen

Best Supporting Actor: Henrik Mestad - Sønner

Best Cinematographer: John Christian Rosenlund - "Den brysomme mannen"

Best Writer: Per Schreiner - "Den brysomme mannen"

Best Editing: Olivier Bugge Couté - "Reprise"

Best Sound Design: Christian Schaanning - "Fritt Vilt"

Best Soundtrack: Simon Boswell - Slipp Jimmy Fri

Best Innovation: Production Designer Are Sjaastad and Cinematographer John Christian Rosenlund won the award for the visuals of the universe in "Den brysomme mannen".

People's Choice Award: "Slipp Jimmy Fri"

== The Kanon Award 2008 ==
Best Director: Stian Kristiansen - "Reprise"

Best Producer: John M. Jacobsen and Sveinung Golimo - "Max Manus"

Best Main Actor (Male): Pål Sverre Valheim Hagen - "De Usynlige"

Best Main Actor (Female): Agnes Kittelsen - "Max Manus"

Best Supporting Actor: Arthur Berning - "Mannen som elsket Yngve"

Best Cinematographer: Geir Hartly Andreassen - "Max Manus"

Best Writer: Thomas Nordseth-Tiller - "Max Manus"

Best Editing: Vidar Flataukan - "Mannen som elsket Yngve"

Best Sound Design: Baard Haugan Ingebretsen and Tormod Ringnes - "Max Manus"

Best Soundtrack: Aslak Hartberg - "I et speil, i en gåte"

Best Innovation: Rune Denstad Langlo - "99% ærlig"

== The Kanon Award 2009 ==
Best Director: Sara Johnsen - "Upperdog"

Best Producer: Brede Hovland and Sigve Endresen - "Nord"

Best Main Actor (Male): Anders Baasmo Christiansen - "Nord"

Best Main Actor (Female): Maria Bonnevie - "Engelen"

Best Supporting Actor: Pål Sverre Valheim Hagen - "Jernanger"

Best Cinematographer: John Andreas Andersen - "Upperdog"

Best Writer: Sara Johnsen - "Upperdog"

Best Editing: Žaklina Stojcevska - "Upperdog"

Best Sound Design: Jan Bang, Arve Henriksen og Erik Honoré - "Jakten på hukommelsen"

Best Soundtrack: Aslak Hartberg - "I et speil, i en gåte"

Best Innovation: Margreth Olin - "Engelen"
