= Piotr Domalewski =

Polish film producer and director (born 1951)

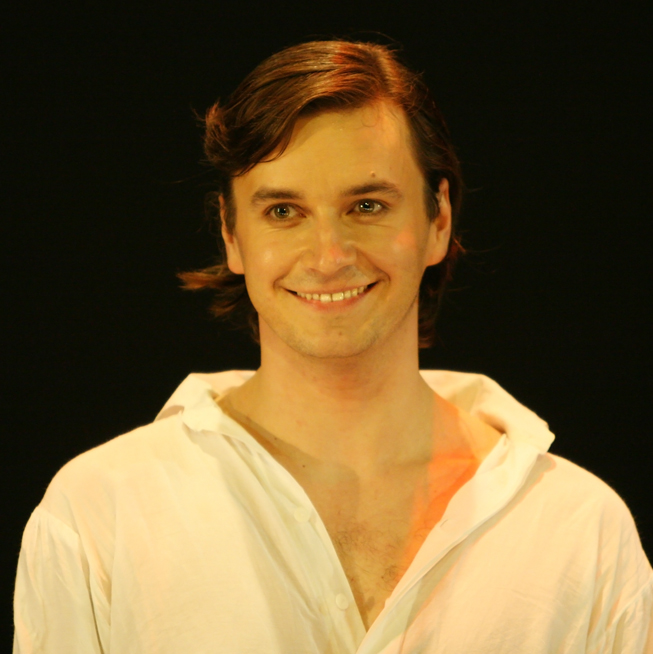
- Domalewski in 2009
- Born: 17 April 1983 (age 43); Łomża, Poland
- Education: National Academy of Dramatic Art; AST National Academy of Theatre Arts; Krzysztof Kieślowski Film School
- Occupations: Actor; director; screenwriter
- Years active: 2009–present

Piotr Domalewski (born 17 April 1983) is a Polish actor, director, and screenwriter.

== Early life ==
Domalewski was born to a large family in Łomża; he has four sisters and one brother. He studied acting at the Białystok branch of the National Academy of Dramatic Art and the AST National Academy of Theatre Arts in Kraków. He also studied directing at Krzysztof Kieślowski Film School in Katowice.

== Filmmaking credits ==
=== Film ===
Year	Title	Director	Screenwriter	Notes	Ref.
2017	60 Kilos of Nothing	Yes	Yes	Short film	
2017	Silent Night	Yes	Yes		
2020	I Never Cry	Yes	Yes		
2021	Operation Hyacinth	Yes	No		
2025	Altar Boys	Yes	Yes		

=== Television ===
Year	Title	Director	Screenwriter	Notes	Ref.
2020	Mały zgon	No	Yes	10 episodes	
2021	Sexify	Yes	Yes	Also series' creator	
2024	Kiedy ślub?	Yes	No	2 episodes	

== Awards and nominations ==
Award	Year	Category	Nominated work	Result	Ref.
Camerimage	2021	Golden Frog	Operation Hyacinth	Nominated	
Polish Film Awards	2018	Best Film	Silent Night	Won	
Polish Film Awards	2018	Best Director	Silent Night	Won	
Polish Film Awards	2018	Best Screenplay	Silent Night	Won	
Polish Film Awards	2018	Discovery of the Year	Silent Night	Won	
Polish Film Awards	2018	Audience Award	Silent Night	Won	
Polish Film Awards	2021	Best Film	I Never Cry	Nominated	
Polish Film Awards	2021	Best Director	I Never Cry	Nominated	
Polish Film Awards	2021	Best Screenplay	I Never Cry	Nominated	
Polish Film Awards	2022	Best TV Series	Sexify	Nominated	
Polish Film Awards	2026	Best Film	Altar Boys	Nominated	
Polish Film Awards	2026	Best Director	Altar Boys	Nominated	
