= Expecting Love =

- Film poster
- Polish: Mała wielka miłość
- Directed by: Lukasz Karwowski
- Written by: Lukasz Karwowski, Kas Graham
- Produced by: Richard J. Dubin; Feliks Pastusiak; Ian Truitner; Anna Iwaszkiewicz; Dariusz Pietrykowski
- Starring: Joshua Leonard; Agnieszka Grochowska; Mikolaj Grabowski; Agnieszka Pilaszewska; Robert Forster; Michael Dunn; Liz Torres
- Cinematography: Arkadiusz Tomiak
- Edited by: Jaroslaw Barzan, Milenia Fiedler
- Music by: Piotr Komorowski
- Production companies: Grupa Filmowa, CrossCut Films
- Release date: February 29, 2008 (Poland)
- Running time: 107 minutes
- Countries: Poland, United States
- Languages: Polish, English

Expecting Love (Polish: Mała wielka miłość, lit. 'Little big love') is a 2008 Polish/American film directed by Łukasz Karwowski and written by Łukasz Karwowski and Kas Graham, starring Joshua Leonard, Agnieszka Grochowska, Robert Forster, Michael Dunn, Mikolaj Grabowski and Agnieszka Pilaszewska.

== Plot ==
Ian (Joshua Leonard) is a successful American lawyer and rising star in a Los Angeles firm run by George Patten (Robert Forster). Ian's life is upended when he discovers a fling he had with Joanna (Agnieszka Grochowska), a Polish woman, has resulted in a pregnancy. With his career on the line, Ian heads to Warsaw in an attempt to talk Joanna out of keeping the baby, but what he discovers on the other side of the world leads to unexpected twists and turns, forcing to him to confront his priorities in life and love.

== Release ==
The film was released in Poland theatrically on March 23, 2008.

== Cast ==
- Joshua Leonard as Ian
- Agnieszka Grochowska as Joanna Malczyk
- Mikolaj Grabowski as Bogdan
- Agnieszka Pilaszewska as Aldona
- Marcin Bosak as Marcel
- Michael Dunn as Steve
- Robert Forster as Agent Stenson
- Liz Torres as Juanita
- Lukasz Simlat as Zbyszek
- Anna Guzik as Marianna
- Cathy Doe as Chloe
- Maciej Kowalewski as Policeman 1
- Maciej Wierzbicki as Policeman 2
- Agnieszka Wielgosz as Prostitute
- Sean Smith as SEC Agent #1
- Wil Bowers as SEC Agent #2
- Marcin Perchuc as Doctor
- Sara Erikson as Kelly
- Redbad Klynstra as Dumplings bar owner
- Michal Zurawski as Hotel security
- David Groh as Used Car Dealer
- Agata Kulesza as Doctor
