= No Ghosts on Good Street =

2025 film directed by Emi Buchwald

- Directed by: Emi Buchwald
- Written by: Emi Buchwald; Karol Marczak
- Starring: Bartłomiej Deklewa; Izabella Dudziak; Tymoteusz Rożynek; Karolina Rzepa
- Cinematography: Tomasz Gajewski
- Edited by: Anna Łuka
- Music by: Katarzyna Gawlik; Jerzy Rogiewicz
- Release dates: September 23, 2025 (FPFF); March 13, 2026 (Poland)
- Running time: 90 minutes
- Country: Poland
- Language: Polish

No Ghosts on Good Street (Polish: Nie ma duchów w mieszkaniu na Dobrej) is a 2025 Polish drama film directed by Emi Buchwald and written by Buchwald and Karol Marczak.

== Cast ==
- Bartłomiej Deklewa as Benek
- Izabella Dudziak as Nastka
- Tymoteusz Rożynek as Franek
- Karolina Rzepa as Jana
- Piotr Napierała as Stach
- Daria Muszyńska as Zuza

== Soundtrack ==
The film includes a song Serce (Heart) by Liryka Składu Ostródzkiego.

== Accolades ==
In 2025, Emi Buchwald, the writer and director of No Ghosts on Good Street, received an award for best directing, a journalists' award and Andrzej Żuławski "Złoty Pazur” award at the Polish Film Festival in Gdynia.

For their roles in the film, Bartłomiej Deklewa, Izabella Dudziak and Karolina Rzepa received nominations for the Zbigniew Cybulski Award in 2026.

The film received 2026 Polish Film Awards for best supporting actress (Karolina Rzepa) and for discovery of the year (Emi Buchwald), moreover it was nominated for best film, best direction (Emi Buchwald), best screenplay (Emi Buchwald, Karol Marczak), best music (Katarzyna Gawlik, Jerzy Rogiewicz), best sound (Aleksandra Landsmann), best editing (Anna Łuka), best actress (Izabella Dudziak) and best actor (Bartłomiej Deklewa).
