= Kissed by Winter =

2005 film

Vinterkyss Kissed by Winter
- Norwegian Theatrical poster
- Directed by: Sara Johnsen
- Written by: Ståle Stein Berg; Sara Johnsen
- Produced by: Christian Fredrik Martin; Asle Vatn
- Starring: Kristoffer Joner; Annika Hallin; Linn Skåber; Fritjof Såheim; Michalis Koutsogiannakis; Göran Ragnerstam
- Cinematography: Odd Reinhardt Nicolaysen
- Music by: Ståle Caspersen
- Release date: 11 February 2005
- Running time: 84 minutes
- Country: Norway
- Languages: Norwegian; Swedish; English

Kissed by Winter (Norwegian: Vinterkyss) is a Norwegian film that first premiered February 11, 2005 starring Norwegian actor Kristoffer Joner and Swedish actress Annika Hallin.

Vinterkyss is similar to the Danish film Brødre in that it paints a very real picture of what can happen to family members in the event of an unexpected death. The movie is about the pain and sorrow that occurs after a loved one's death, as well as how love can appear in the most unexpected of places, even if it is not wanted. The film shows, in an authentic and convincing way, the daily lives of the characters, as well as what it is like to live in a very small community in a very large world.

Victoria (Annika Hallin) starts a new life as a doctor in small, snowy Norwegian town. The film is a story of Victoria's struggle to deal with the deaths of two people: one who was very close to her (her son) and the other very distant (a stranger).

Early one winter morning, a young man is found dead in the snow. Victoria points out that the circumstances surrounding the death are unclear, but the police officer figures that the dead teenager must have been hit by the snow plow and then buried under the snow. The stories of the two deaths become intertwined as Victoria tries to unravel the mystery of Darjosh, the young man found dead in the snow.

Although Darjosh's parents are very reluctant to deal with Victoria, as the movie progresses, they become closer. At the same time she begins a relationship with the town's snow plow driver, Kai.

== Awards ==
- AFI Fest 2005

Won, Grand Jury Prize - Sara Johnsen

- Amanda Awards, Norway 2005

Won, Best Actress (Årets kvinnelige skuespiller) - Annika Hallin
Won, Best Debut - Sara Johnsen
