= Jolanta Dylewska =

Polish cinematographer (born 1958)

- Born: 9 March 1958; Wrocław
- Citizenship: Polish
- Occupations: Cinematographer, film director

Jolanta Dylewska (born 9 March 1958) is a cinematographer, screenwriter and film director.

== Biography ==
She graduated from the Faculty of Film and Television Directing and Cinematography and Television Production at the National Film School in Łódź; she obtained diploma from the Cinematography Department in 1991.

She became lecturer at the Cinematography and Television Production Department of the National Film School in Łódź, serving as its dean from 2020 to 2024. She also taught at the Filmakademie Baden-Wuerttemberg in Ludwigsburg, Germany. She was chosen a member of the Polish Society of Cinematographers (PSC), the Polish Film Academy, the European Film Academy (EFA), the Asian Film Academy (AFAA), and the American Academy of Motion Picture Arts and Sciences (AMPAS).

== Filmography ==
=== Director of photography ===
- Conversation with a Cupboard Man (1993)
- Królowa aniołów (1999)
- Głośniej od bomb (2001)
- Edelweiss Pirates (2004)
- W dół kolorowym wzgórzem (2004)
- Doskonałe popołudnie (2005)
- The Boy on the Galloping Horse (2006)
- Made in Poland (2010)
- In Darkness (2011)
- Spoor (2017)
- Ayka (2018)
- Below the Surface (Przejście, 2021)
- Orzeł. Ostatni patrol (2022)
- Brat (2024)
- Through the Wall (2026)

=== Director ===
- Children of the Night (1999)
- Po-lin (2009)
- Marek Edelman... And There Was Love in the Ghetto (2019, with Andrzej Wajda)

== Accolades ==
She won Polish Academy Award for Best Cinematography for In Darkness. In 2013 she received Silver Gloria Artis Medal for Merit to Culture.
