= Dariusz Gajewski =

Polish film director and screenwriter

- Born: 3 December 1964 (age 61); Częstochowa, Poland
- Education: National Film School in Łódź
- Occupations: Film director, screenwriter
- Spouse: Agnieszka Grochowska
- Children: 2

Dariusz Gajewski (born 3 December 1964, Częstochowa) is a Polish film director and screenwriter.

== Life and Career ==
He graduated from the National Film School in Łódź in 1993. He also studied law at the Jagiellonian University in Kraków. His 2003 film Warszawa ("Warsaw") won the Golden Lions Award at the 28th Gdynia Film Festival. Between 2008–2016, he was the chairman of the Andrzej Munk Film Studio Młodzi i Film. Since 2016, he has served as deputy director of the Polish Filmmakers Association.

In 2004, he married actress Agnieszka Grochowska. In 2012 their first son was born — Władysław, and in 2016 the second son — Henryk.

== Filmography ==
- Nie bój, nie bój (1994)
- Utwór na chłopca i lampę (1996)
- Franciszek muzykant (1998)
- Anatol lubi podróże (1999)
- Stara muzyka (1999)
- Konwój (1999)
- Tu jest wszystko (2000)
- AlaRm (2002)
- Warszawa (2003)
- Lekcje pana Kuki (2007)
- Obce niebo (2015)
- Czas niedokończony. Wiersze księdza Jana Twardowskiego (2015)
- Legiony (2019)

== See also ==
- Polish cinema
- List of Poles
