= Bartłomiej Deklewa =

Polish actor (born 2000)

- Born: 2000 (age 25–26)
- Citizenship: Polish
- Occupation: Actor

Bartłomiej Deklewa (born 2000) is an actor.

== Biography ==
He graduated from the AST National Academy of Theatre Arts in Kraków.

== Filmography ==
- Absolute Beginners (2023) as Niko
- BringBackAlice (2023) as Patryk
- Światłoczuła (2024) as Igor
- Rzecz niezbędna (2024) as groom
- Idź pod prąd (2024) as "Tomkas"
- Nie ma duchów w mieszkaniu na Dobrej (2025) as Benek
- 13 dni do wakacji (2025)
- Breslau (2025)

== Accolades ==
- Zbigniew Zapasiewicz Award "Zapasowa maska" for his role in the play Oresteia directed by Michał Zadara at the 41st Festival of Theatre Schools in Łódź
- Nomination for the Zbyszek Cybulski Award for his role in Nie ma duchów w mieszkaniu na Dobrej (2026)
