= Tofifest =

Film Festival in Toruñ, Poland

TOFIFEST International Film Festival
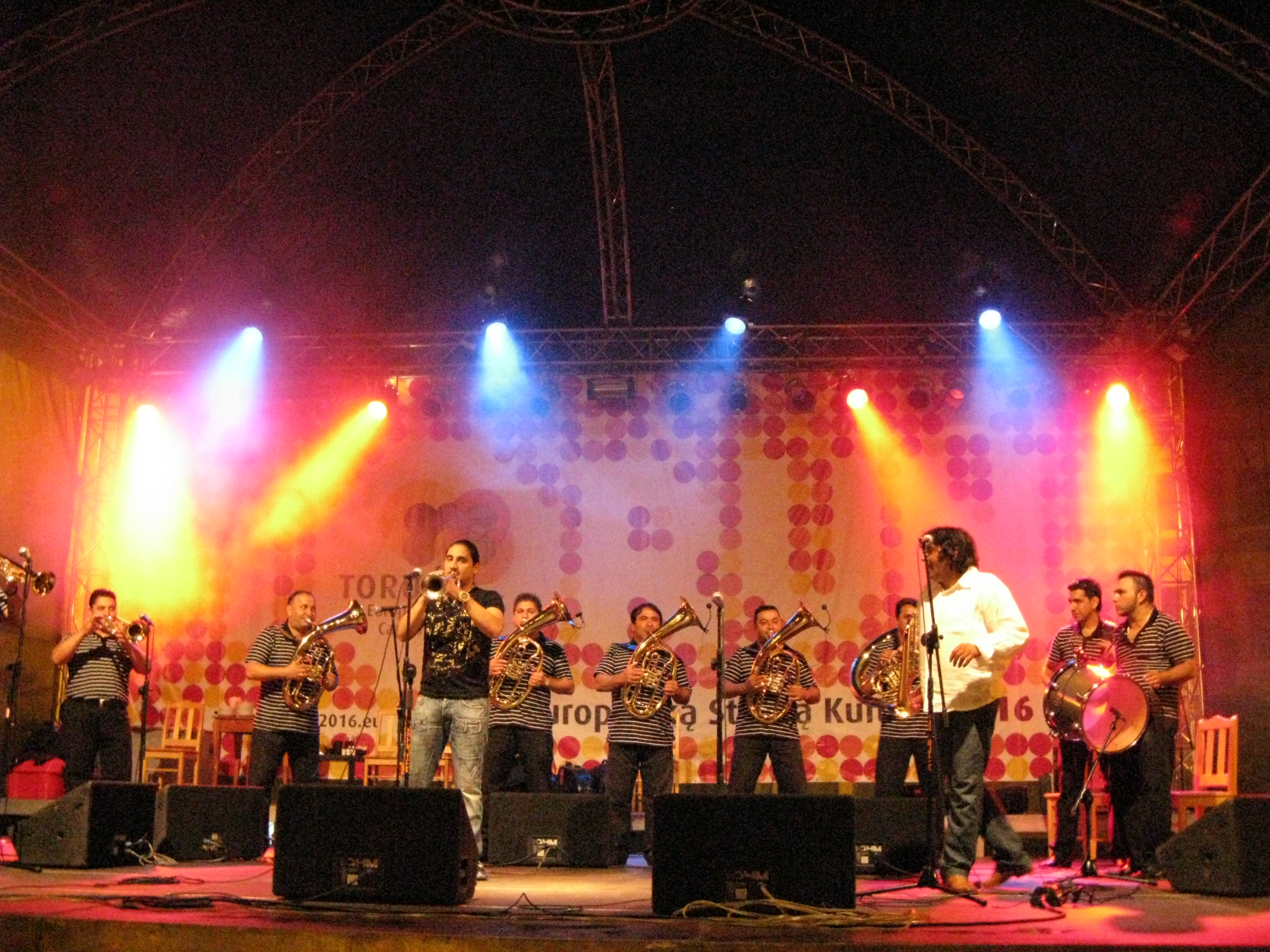
- Boban i Marko Marković Orkestar during the 2008 Tofifest festival
- Location: Toruń, Poland
- Founded: 2002
- Awards: Golden Angel
- Language: Polish; English
- Website: Tofifest Official website

The TOFIFEST International Film Festival is a film festival that takes place annually in Toruń, Poland.

It is one of the fastest growing film festivals in Poland and the mission of the Festival is to promote independent cinema. The festival combines Polish and European dimensions in the context of an adventurous and defiant breadth of content, including auteur cinema, and premieres of films presented in Cannes, Berlin and Rotterdam, building a bridge between high and popular art. The festival also includes meetings, seminars, concerts and workshops.

== History ==
The first independent film festival in Toruń Polish OFF Film Festival was held in 2002. It was founded by Monika Weychert-Waluszko and Marek Nowak. The festival was the continuation of the x!-muse tradition. Monika Weychert-Waluszko was the main organiser of film meetings at the Muses House that started in 2000. After a conflict that took place at the Muses House, Weychert was dismissed. Her successor, Katarzyna Jaworska, continued the idea of establishing the art house film festival in Toruń.

=== Torun Independent Film Festival TOFFI 2003 ===
The Festival began in December 2003 as the Toruń Independent Film Festival TOFFI. That year, the festival presented 95 films. The Festival included mainly Polish experimental films of all lengths from student film-makers. The programme also included previews of professional films. At the Grand Prize Competition the audience chose Motór by Wieslaw Palucha as the winner.

=== Toruń Independent Film Festival TOFFI 2004 ===
In the 2nd edition festival was moved to October and renamed Toruń Independent Film Festival TOFFI. The jury started to be composed of professionals. The winner was chosen by a grand jury. The main award at the festival was OFFIK. The jury comprised Małgorzata Foremniak, Maciej Dominiak, Waldemar Dziki, Barkiet Fukiet and Romuald Pokojski. The jury chose as the winning Krew z Nosa by Dominik Matwiejczyk. At the festival some works were nominated for OFFSkars Awards.

=== International Toruń Film Festival TOFFI 2005 ===
In 2005 festival changed its name to International Toruń Film Festival TOFFI. The changes were also made in the formula of the festival: resigning from amateur films, qualifying for competition both Polish and international productions. Ugór by Dominik Matwiejczyk won the Golden Angel, a major award of the festival. Diabeł by Tomasz Szafrański, was awarded the Golden Mannequin for the most artistically tasteful film and FLISAK, award of President of Toruń for artist from Kujawsko-Pomorskie region.

=== International Toruń Film Festival TOFFI 2006 ===
International Toruń Film Festival TOFFI was held from 18 to 22 October 2006. There were now two separate competitions organised for features and shorts. American production We Go Way Back by Lynn Shelton won the Golden Angel for best feature film. The Golden Angel for short was awarded to Emilka płacze by Rafał Kapeliński, which also received the FLISAK Award. Special Jury Prize and Critic Award of Zygmunt Kałużyński was won by the Slovenian film Odgrobadogroba by Jan Cvitkovic.

=== International Film Festival TOFIFEST 2007 ===
TOFIFEST International Film Festival was held in November 2007. The Golden Angel for a feature film, which also received the audience award, went to the British film Hallam Foe, directed by David Mackenzie. The jury also singled out the British film The Mark of Cain, directed by Marc Munden, for a special prize. The Golden Angel award in the category of short films was received by Bartek Konopka for the film Three, and a special prize went to Romanian director Radu Jude for the film Lampa cu Caciula. The critics' award: Zygmunt Kałużyński received the New Zealand Eagle vs Shark directed by Taika Waititi, and Rafter: Łukasz Karwowski for the film South-North.

=== International Film Festival TOFIFEST 2008 ===
International Film Festival Tofifest took place from 5–11 July. Apart from films, in the summertime organizers of the festival offered meetings, live music and plenty of outdoor events. There was a performance of Serbian band Boban and Marković Orkestar as an addition to the projection of Gucha - Distant Trumpet. In 2008 festival expanded and to the international short and feature film competitions added two new: Polish feature film competition and FORWARD! competition for best rule-breaking film. Tofifest 2008 Awards:

- Golden Angel for the best feature film – Padre nuestro by Christopher Zalla (USA)
- Golden Angel for the best feature film – Auf der Strecke by Reto Caffi (Germany)
- Golden Angel at the FORWARD! Competition for best rule-breaking film – Look Both Ways by Sarah Watt (Australia)
- Golden Angel in Polish Competition (Audience Award) – Sztuczki by Andrzej Jakimowski
- Special Jury Prize – Chop Shop by Ramin Bahrani and Bahareh Azimi
- Critic Award of Zygmunt Kałużyński – Ładunek 200 by Aleksiej Balabanow.

=== International Film Festival TOFIFEST 2009 ===
Festival took place from 26 June until 3 July. The 7th edition main motto was: "Films are for people". Film Festival programmed special selections such as: Swiss Cinema, Alain Tanner and Michael Haneke retrospectives, Spaghetti Westerns, New Albanian and Kosovan Cinema, Polish Cinema Women with Barbara Sass and Helena Grassowna retrospectives. Helena Grassowna, the actress, who was born in Toruń, was also honored with memorial plaque. Among festival guests were: Janusz Gajos, Agnieszka Grochowska, Krzysztof Zanussi and Małgorzata Kożuchowska.

Grand Prix:

- Golden Angel for the best feature film – Home by Ursula Meier (Switzerland)
- Golden Angel for the best short film – Vacsora by Karchi Perlmann (Hungary)
- Audience Award for Polish film – Boisko bezdomnych by Katarzyna Adamik (Poland)
- Critic Award of Zygmunt Kałużyński – I've Loved You So Long by Philippe Claudel (France/Germany)
- FLISAK Tofifest Award for artist from Kujawsko-Pomorskie region – Magdalena Czerwińska

The Jury adjudged two Special Awards for feature and short film. Awards rembed to Wrong Rosary by Mahmut Fazil Coskun (Turkey) and Please say something by David O’Reilly (Ireland). Some awards were given by the Jurors of short and full-length competitions for films who they wanted to distinguish in a special way. They were classified in various categories. Full-length competition categories and winners: Best Director – Xawery Żuławski, Best Screenplay – Nanni Moretti, The Best Actress – Isabelle Huppert, Best Actor – Nadir Saribacak, Best Editor – Manuel Muñoz, Carlos Serrano Azcona and Carlos Reygadas Best Cinematographer – Lol Crawley. Short competition categories and winners: Best Director – Runar Runarsson, Best Screenplay – Peter Besson, Best Actress – Aisling Lotus, Best Actor – Ben Whisman, Best Editor – Erhan Acar, Best Cinematographer – Lol Crawley.

Janusz Gajos was honoured with Special Golden Angel.

=== International Film Festival TOFIFEST 2010 ===
8th International Torun Film Festival Tofifest held from 26 June to 2 July. From this year the most important competition of the festival is ON AIR which presented the first and second films of directors from all over the world. The leading slogan was: "Because everyone has a rebel inside". The most important sections of that edition were: retrospectives of Costa-Gavras and Ken Russell, Camp Cinema, New Georgian Cinema.

More than the traditional film projections, this festival offered its visitors plenty of outdoor concerts or educational programs such as: concert of Polish film songs from recent years with the stars such as Dezerter, O.S.T.R., Dick4Dick, Mosqito, of cinema Institute B61, weekly creative workshops for children "Filmogranie". Many of that events took place among the Gothic buildings, at the Old Town market. That year among festival guests were: Julia Jentsch, Shirin Neshat, Bogusław Linda, Anna Polony and Wojciech Smarzowski.

Grand Prix:

- Golden Angel for the best feature film – 10 to 11 by Pelin Esmer (Turkey)
- Golden Angel for the best short film – Hanoi-Warsaw by Katarzyna Klimkiewicz (Poland)
- FROM POLAND for Polish film – The Dark House by Wojciech Smarzowski (Poland)
- Critic Award of Zygmunt Kaluzynski – First of All. Felicita by Razvan Radulescu and Mellisa de Raaf (Romania)
- FLISAK Tofifest Award for artist from Kujawsko-Pomorskie region – Olga Bołądź and Marcin Gładych

The international Jury adjudged two more awards. Special award for outstanding actor creation was received by Orsolyi Toth (Hungary) for the role in film Women without Men. The second award rambled to Altiplano (Belgium/Germany/The Netherlands) by Peter Brossens and Jessica Woodworth. Favorite film of Tofifest audience became Felicita (Georgia) by Salome Aleksi. Jury gave also a special award for documentary film Marysina Polana directed by Grzegorz Zariczny (Poland). The Jury acknowledged Romanian Bobby Paunescu as the best director. Julia Jentsch and Bogusław Linda were honoured with Special Golden Angels.

=== International Film Festival TOFIFEST 2016 ===
Grand Prix:

- Golden Angel for the Outstanding European Film Artist – To Erik Poppe
