= Agnieszka Grochowska =

Polish actress (born 1979)

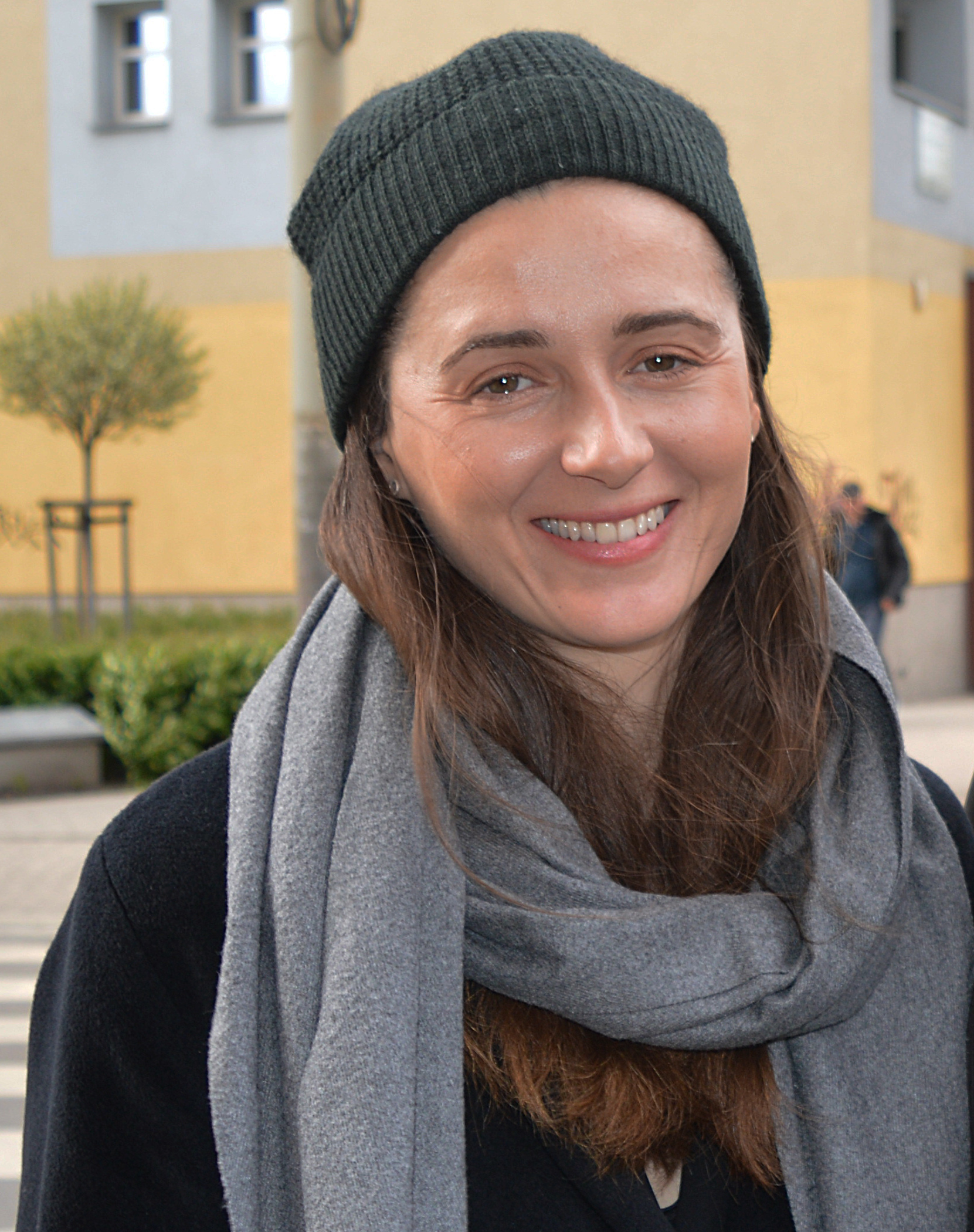
- Grochowska in 2017
- Born: Agnieszka Grochowska; December 31, 1979 (age 46); Warsaw, Poland
- Other name: Agnieszka Grochowska-Gajewska
- Education: Aleksander Zelwerowicz National Academy of Dramatic Art in Warsaw
- Occupation: Actress
- Years active: 2001–present
- Spouse: Dariusz Gajewski (m. 2004)
- Children: 2
- Awards: Gold Cross of Merit (2014); Bronze Medal for Merit to Culture – Gloria Artis (2014)

Agnieszka Grochowska (Polish pronunciation: [aɡˈɲɛʂka ɡrɔˈxɔfska], born 31 December 1979) is a Polish film and theatre actress. She is a two-time recipient of Polish Film Awards having won the Polish Academy Award for Best Actress in 2013 and the Polish Academy Award for Best Supporting Actress in 2024.

== Life ==
She was born on 31 December 1979 in Warsaw. She graduated from the National Academy of Dramatic Art in Warsaw in 2002. In 2003, she started working at the Studio Theatre in Warsaw.

She is the recipient of the 2007 Shooting Stars Award. For her role in Shameless (2012), she received the Polish Academy Award for Best Actress, while her performances in The Welts (2004), In Darkness (2011) and Walesa. Man of Hope (2013) earned her three additional nominations. Grochowska was also recognised as the Best Actress for her role in the Norwegian comedy film Upperdog (2009) at the Amanda Awards, and received Polish Film Festival Awards for Trzy minuty. 21:37 (2011) and Obce niebo (2015). She was nominated for the Kanon Award, awarded at the Kosmorama International Film Festival in Trondheim. Her other notable roles include Julia in Just Love Me (2006) and Joanna in Expecting Love (2008). She had a supporting role in the 2018 musical drama Teen Spirit where she played the mother of Elle Fanning's character, Marla.

Grochowska was honoured with the Gold Cross of Merit and the Bronze Medal for Merit to Culture – Gloria Artis by the Polish government for her contributions to Polish culture.

Since July 2004, she has been married to director Dariusz Gajewski. In 2012 their first son was born — Władysław, and in 2016 the second — Henryk.

== Selected filmography ==
Year	Title	Role	Notes
2004	En Route	Kazia	
2004	The Welts	Tania	Nominated—Polish Academy Award for Best Actress; Nominated—Jameson People's Choice Award for Best Actress; Nominated—Golden Duck Award for Best Polish Actress
2005	Nina's Journey	Nina Rajmic	
2006	Just Love Me	Julia	
2006	We're All Christs	Young Adaś Miauczyński's mother	
2007	Ekipa	Dorota	Television series
2008	Expecting Love	Joanna Malczyk	
2009	Upperdog	Maria	Amanda Award for Best Actress; Nominated—The Kanon Award for Best Actress
2010	Beyond the Steppes	Nina	Ostend Film Festival Award for Best Actress
2011	Trzy minuty. 21:37	Language teacher	Polish Film Festival Award for Best Supporting Actress; Nominated—Zbigniew Cybulski Award
2011	Nie opuszczaj mnie	Joanna Rolska	Nominated—Zbigniew Cybulski Award
2011	80 Million	Anka	
2011	In Darkness	Klara Keller	Polish Film Festival Award for Best Actress; Nominated—Polish Academy Award for Best Actress; Nominated—Zbigniew Cybulski Award
2012	Shameless	Anka	Polish Academy Award for Best Actress; Nominated—Zbigniew Cybulski Award
2013	Walesa: Man of Hope	Danuta Wałęsa	Nominated—Polish Academy Award for Best Actress
2015	Child 44	Nina Andreyeva	
2015	Obce niebo	Basia	Polish Film Festival Award for Best Actress; Best Actress award in Polish Feature Film Competition at International Festival of Independent Cinema Off Camera
2015	Persona Non Grata	Irina	
2017	Polizeiruf 110	Anna Kowalska	Television series Episode: "Das Beste für mein Kind"
2018	Teen Spirit	Marla	
2019	Nielegalni	Ewa Dębska	Television series
2019	Sanctuary	Dr Kowalska	Television series 7 episodes
2019–present	Motyw	Anna "Czarna" Czarnecka	Television series Main cast
2020	My Wonderful Wanda	Wanda	
2020	The Woods	Laura Goldsztajn	Miniseries; Main cast
2021	Leave No Traces	Grazyna Popiel	
2022	How I Fell in Love with a Gangster	Milena 'Czarna'	
2022	Hold Tight	Laura Goldsztajn-Kopińska	
2023	Mother's Day	Nina Nowak	
2023	Scarborn	Maria Giżyńska	
2024	Unpredictable	Martyna	
2024	Brat	Agnieszka, mother of Dawid and Michał	
2026	Through the Wall	investigator	
