= Symmetry (film) =

- Directed by: Konrad Niewolski
- Starring: Arkadiusz Detmer; Andrzej Chyra
- Cinematography: Arkadiusz Tomiak
- Music by: Michał Lorenc
- Release date: 17 September 2003 (GFF)
- Running time: 99 min
- Country: Poland
- Language: Polish

Symmetry (Polish: Symetria) is a 2003 Polish drama film written and directed by Konrad Niewolski. It follows the story of a 26-year-old college student played by Arek Detmer who is falsely accused of robbery and sent to prison. The film was generally well received in Poland for its depiction of prison conditions.

== Plot ==
In the first scene of the movie, before the title credits, a prison guard is seen writing a report from an event in one of the cells, in which a dead body was found. The guard writes "suicide" as a probable cause of death. Although it is not explicitly explained, it is implied that this scene takes part after the rest of the action of the movie.

On a very rainy evening a young man, Łukasz Machnacki, comes out of a cinema. He is approached by policemen, who without any questions or explanation handcuff him and take him to the police car. He is forced to take part in a police lineup. Łukasz does not understand anything that is happening, and is shocked to learn, during an interrogation, that he has been recognized by an elderly woman, a robbery victim, as the culprit. He maintains his innocence, but is unable to provide any alibi. The officer who interrogates him informs Łukasz he's arrested and is unlikely to go back home any time soon.

Łukasz is then transferred into prison for a pre-trial detention. He is first put into a transition cell, in which he meets Zborek, a man arrested for car theft. Zborek explains to Łukasz that he is most likely to spend no less than a year in prison before his trial. Zborek also asks Łukasz if he is willing to become a "git" - a member of the prison subculture known as grypsera (which is also a Polish term for a prison slang used by its members), considered to be an elite among the prisoners. He also scares Łukasz that if he does not join the subculture, he is likely to become "a loser" and would be abused by other prisoners. As a result, when Łukasz is later interviewed by a member of the prison staff, who is about to decide where to place him, Łukasz insists that he wants to take part in the grypsera. The prison worker is surprised by this and warns Łukasz he will not be able to handle it, but eventually agrees to place him in a cell with the subculture members.

Łukasz is led to a cell in which he meets his new cellmates - Kosior, the apparent cell leader, arrested for murdering his partner in crime; Siwy (Grey), a member of the mob; Albert, a minor mobster; Roman, arrested for avoiding paying child maintenance, who is visibly the lowest in the cell hierarchy; and Dawid, a very quiet man who spends most of his time reading books and seems to take no active part in the prison subculture, but is treated with respect by other prisoners anyway. Łukasz is right away teased by Albert, and by Siwy, who tells him that they will have a fist fight in the evening. Scared Łukasz doesn't answer anything to that but later is willing to take part in the fight, knowing he would be considered a coward if he refused. Siwy then reveals that it was just a tease, indeed meaning to check whether Łukasz would really do it. Following days Roman teaches Łukasz the basic rules of living in prison, while Kosior teaches him about the grypsera.

Some time later Łukasz is visited in prison by an attorney hired by his mother. The lawyer informs Łukasz that the prosecutor means to accuse him not only of robbery, but also unintentional homicide, as the woman who recognized him as the robber, died just a few hours later. The lawyer tells Łukasz that he will do his best to get him out of prison, but the investigation may take months before anything could be done.

One evening, Albert tells the cellmates a supposedly funny story of his friends, who kidnapped a girl and forced her into performing oral sex. Unexpectedly Dawid grabs Albert and threatens to break his neck, if he ever hears talk like that from him again. Next day Kosior tells Łukasz Dawid's story: his wife was assaulted and raped, thus Dawid found and beat the rapist to death. After that, he came to the police himself. Dawid's wife comes to see him every week, but during those visits they merely look at each other and do not say a word.

Łukasz, while trying to adjust to life in prison, is haunted by nightmares and continuously teased by Albert. One time he is forced to drink a mixture of detergents as a punishment for accidentally breaking one of the cell's rules. One day a prison guard tells Łukasz to pack his things, as he is about to be released. When Łukasz, packed and ready to go, happily says goodbyes to his cellmates, the guard opens the door and tells Łukasz to unpack, and it was all just a joke. This leaves Łukasz completely devastated and leads him to a suicide attempt.

After some time of depression, Łukasz starts to accept his situation. He later passes an exam of knowledge of the subculture rules with Kosior and is officially accepted as one of its members. He even wins the respect of Albert, when he claims as his some of Albert's contraband, which was discovered by the guard, knowing that Albert would be prohibited from seeing his girlfriend during a visit, if it was blamed on him.

After his trial Siwy is transferred to another prison, and a new prisoner is placed in the cell in his place. Before introducing him, the prison guard tells Łukasz and others that the new prisoner was arrested for child sexual abuse. When the new prisoner enters the cell, Kosior only angrily tells him to stay quiet. He is then forced to eat in the toilet, and gets beaten up in the exercise yard, which the guards see, but ignore.

Łukasz's attorney comes to him with good news: the prosecutor intends to remit his case because of lack of evidence, and he will most likely be released quite soon. Łukasz does not respond anything and does not seem to care anymore. When he gets back to his cell, the guards informs him that the new prisoner is supposed to be released on bail. Łukasz is then visited by his mother and his little sister. Seeing the suspected child abuser at the nearby table, he tells his family to go away from this place, and to remember that he loves them.

Łukasz informs his cellmates that the new prisoner is going to be released. Albert suggests they should kill him and make it look like a suicide, much to Kosior's approval. Łukasz is hesitant about taking part in a murder, but Kosior convinces him by appealing to his care for his little sister. Roman opposes the idea, not wanting to get in any trouble, to which Albert threatens him that they will kill him as well, if he interferes. Before the planned murder Łukasz knocks Roman out with a chair. As a result, Roman is taken to the hospital and left out of possible suspicion. At night, Łukasz, Kosior, Albert and Dawid kill the new prisoner by strangling him and breaking his neck. They hang his body on the window bars, to make it look as he hanged himself.

Next time Łukasz's mother comes to visit him, they only are allowed to see each other through a glass and phone. Łukasz's mother is distraught, asking her son what kind of troubles he got himself into. As she cries, Łukasz tells her that life in prison is different than outside, and she would not understand. He quietly hangs up the phone and leaves.

== Cast ==
- Arkadiusz Detmer – Łukasz
- Andrzej Chyra – Dawid
- Janusz Bukowski – Roman
- Marcin Jędrzejewski – Siwy
- Mariusz Jakus – Kosior
- Borys Szyc – Albert
- Kinga Preis – Dawid's Wife
- Janusz Chabior – Warden

== Reception ==
In a review of Symmetry published in the U.S. in 2003, Variety commended the strong performance by Arek Detmer, "who manages his character's mutation from passive schlemiel to hardened criminal with admirable skill", noting that his "clearly unhinged zeal for vengeance...opens the pic's potential as a wider indictment of society". Nevertheless, it went on to predict that the film would have only limited appeal to international audiences, which would find its treatment of the topic "humdrum".

In later reviews, legal scholars in Poland have critiqued some of the film's inaccuracies in its depiction of the Polish legal system.
