= Through the Wall (2026 film) =

- Directed by: Maciej Sobieszczański
- Written by: Maciej Sobieszczański
- Starring: Maria Dębska, Jakub Gierszał, Agnieszka Grochowska, Arkadiusz Jakubik
- Cinematography: Jolanta Dylewska
- Edited by: Nikodem Chabior
- Music by: Antoni Komasa-Łazarkiewicz, Mary Komasa
- Release date: 2026
- Country: Poland
- Language: Polish

Through the Wall (Polish: Przez ścianę) is a 2026 film written and directed by Maciej Sobieszczański.

== Production ==
Filming began on 6 August 2024 and took place in Katowice, Zabrze, Gliwice, Siemianowice, Świętochłowice, Szombierki, Lipiny, Warszawa and Modlin.

== Cast ==
Source.

- Maria Dębska as Wiesława Pajdak
- Jakub Gierszał as Jerzy Śmiechowski
- Agnieszka Grochowska as investigator
- Arkadiusz Jakubik as Jerzy's father

== Accolades ==
The film won Golden Lions and award for best cinematography (Jolanta Dylewska) at the Polish Film Festival, as well as Special Jury Prize and FIPRESCI Award at the Warsaw Film Festival.
