= Emi Buchwald =

Polish film director and screenwriter (born 1991)

- Born: 15 November 1991 (age 34); Skierniewice
- Citizenship: Polish
- Education: Łódź Film School
- Occupations: Film director, screenwriter

Emi Buchwald née Mazurkiewicz (born 15 November 1991) is a film director and screenwriter.

== Biography ==
In 2017 she graduated in film directing from the Łódź Film School.

== Filmography ==
- No Ghosts on Good Street (2025)

== Awards ==
For her directorial feature film debut, Nie ma duchów w mieszkaniu na dobrej, she received award for best directing, journalists' award and Andrzej Żuławski „Złoty Pazur” award at the Polish Film Festival in Gdynia in 2025.

In 2025 she received the Annual Award of the Minister of Culture and National Heritage and was nominated for the Paszport Polityki in the film category.
