= Arkadiusz Tomiak =

Polish cinematographer (1969–2024)

- Born: 20 February 1969; Koszalin
- Died: 10 June 2024 (aged 55); Lubiewice, Gmina Lubiewo
- Citizenship: Polish
- Occupation: Cinematographer

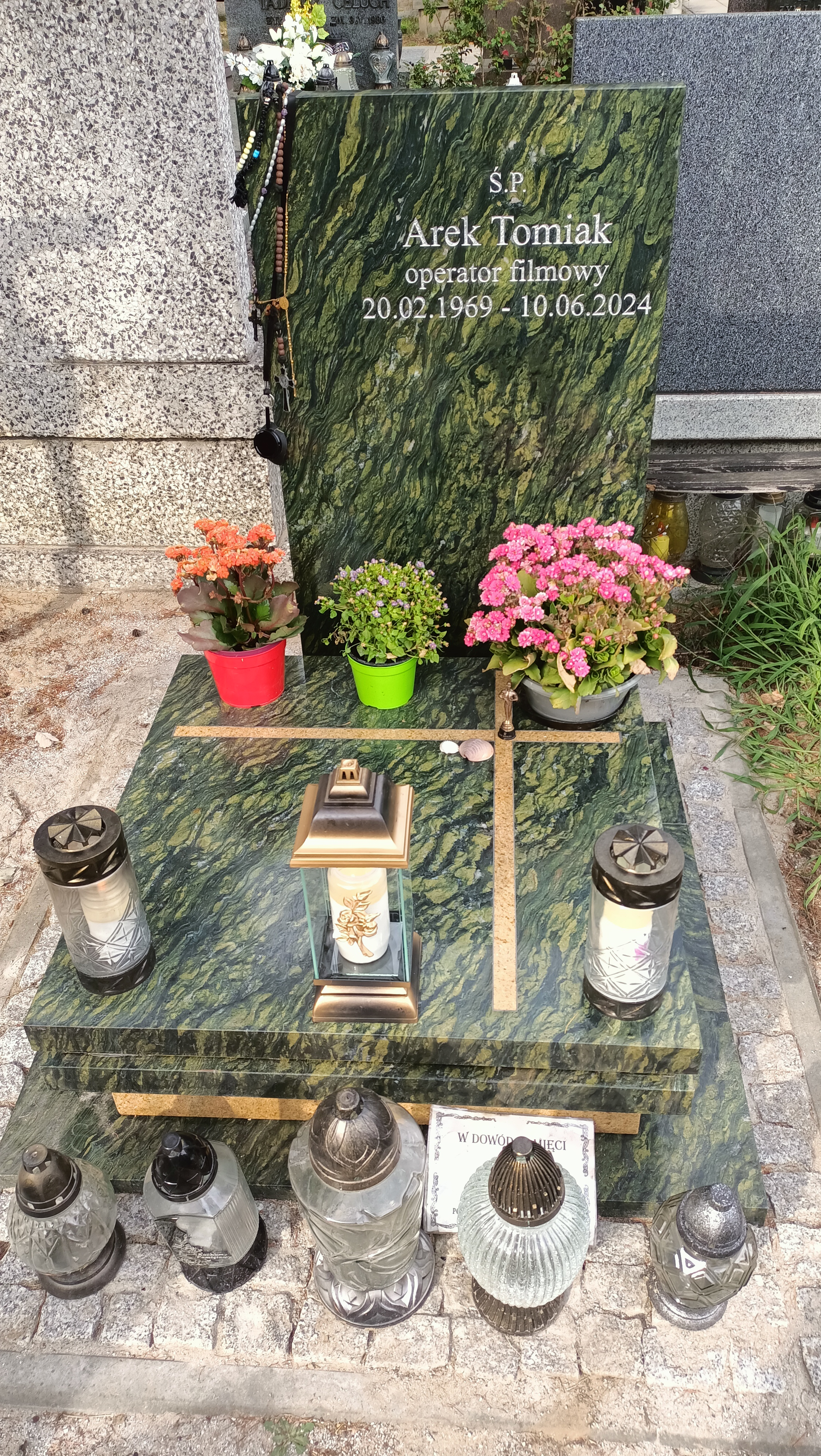
The grave of Arkadiusz Tomiak at the Powązki Military Cemetery, 2025

Arkadiusz Tomiak (20 February 1969 – 10 June 2024) was a cinematographer.

== Biography ==
In 1995 he graduated in cinematography from Łódź Film School. He won Polish Academy Award for Best Cinematography in 2012 and 2015 respectively. From 2015 to 2019, he served as President of the Polish Society of Cinematographers (PSC). He was a member of the European Film Academy (EFA).

He died in a car accident on his way to the Koszalin Film Debut Festival "Youth and Film". He was buried at the Powązki Military Cemetery.

In 2025, the Polish Society of Cinematographers posthumously awarded him the Lifetime Achievement Award for "his exceptional confidence in his own cinematographer's intuition in creating unforgettable film images."

== Filmography ==
=== Cinematography ===
- Keep Away from the Window (2000)
- Słoneczna włócznia (2000), TV series
- Silence (2001)
- Marzenia do spełnienia, TV series
- Career of Nikos Dyzma (2002)
- Symmetry (2003)
- Żurek (film) (2003)
- Magiczne drzewo (2003), TV series
- Your Name Is Justine (2005)
- Statyści (2006)
- Hiena (2006)
- Prawo miasta (2007), TV series
- Expecting Love (2008)
- Zero (2009)
- Enen (2009)
- Kołysanka (2010)
- Mistyfikacja (2010)
- Cudowne lato (2010)
- Daas (2011)
- Manhunt (2012)
- Dziewczyna z szafy (2012)
- Sęp (2012)
- Stacja Warszawa (2013)
- Fotograf (2014)
- Hanyut (2014)
- Karbala (2015)
- Blindness (2016)
- Mały Jakub (2016)
- Volta (2017)
- Niewidzialne (2017)
- Człowiek z magicznym pudełkiem (2017)
- Czarny mercedes (2019)
- Grzyby (2023)
- U Pana Boga w Królowym Moście (2024)
- Pani od polskiego (2024)
- Czerwone maki (2024)

=== Camera operator ===
- The Gateway of Europe (1999)
