= Tel Aviv International Student Film Festival =

- Location: Tel Aviv
- Founded: 1986 by students of TAU's Department of Film and Television
- Festival date: 25 June - 2 July 2025
- Language: English, Hebrew
- Website: https://www.taufilmfest.com/

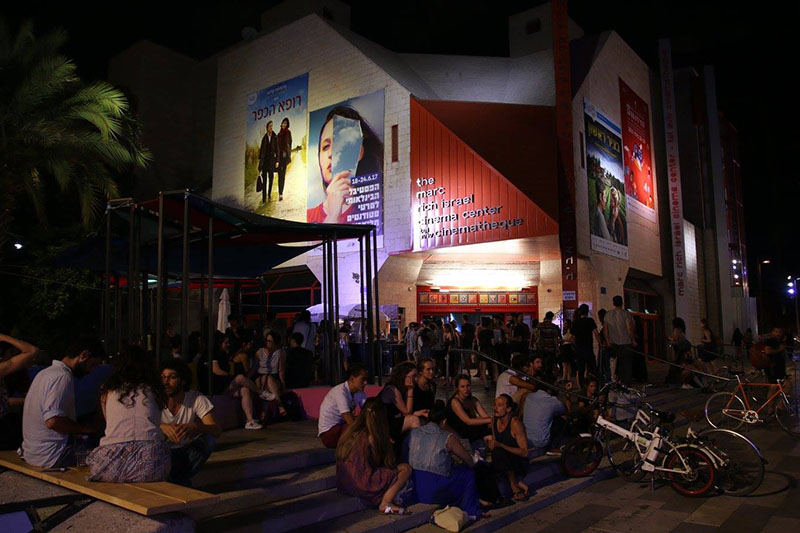
Tel Aviv Cinemateque during TISFF

The Tel Aviv International Student Film Festival (TISFF) is one of the largest student film festivals in the world and is considered one of the most important in its field. The film festival hosts hundreds of students, lecturers and guests of honor from the world's leading film industry in Tel Aviv, for a week of screenings and cultural events. Hundreds of films, premieres, cinematic events, workshops, conferences and special projects are held, inviting thousands of visitors to the Tel Aviv Cinematheque halls every day. Since 2013, it has been held once a year, in June, in Tel Aviv.

TISFF supports and promotes young filmmakers in their first steps in the world of filmmaking, with more than 200 short films from over 30 countries around the world competing. The festival is supported by Tel Aviv University, the Tel Aviv Municipality, the Film Council of the Ministry of Culture and other bodies. The team running the Tel Aviv International Film Festival is comprised mainly by students of the Steve Tisch School of film and Television.

== History ==
TISFF was founded in 1986 by a group of students from The Steve Tisch Department of Film and Television at Tel Aviv University. Throughout its years of operation, the festival has maintained its uniqueness as a cultural, cinematic, young and kicking event, which has become a major festival in Israel and around the world, and presents original groundbreaking student work from the best film schools in the world.

The festival holds five major competitions for short films, including student films from Israel and all around the world, independent films made by young filmmakers in Israel, experimental works of art and an exhibition for digital media projects.

The festival also hosts various film events: artist workshops, masterclasses, social projects, parties, exhibitions and conferences. The international and local film industry attends the festival and nurtures the young filmmakers and the wide audience of critics who come to the Tel Aviv Cinematheque.

In addition to students from films schools from abroad, TISFF hosts international judges and guests of honor, thus bringing the international film industry to Israel. Among past guests of the festival: Martin Scorsese, David Lynch, Claire Denis, Celine Sciamma, Leos Carax, Paolo Sorrentino, Gus Van Sant, Richard Gere, Claude Lanzmann, Marcello Mastroianni, Emir Kusterica, Chantal Ackerman, the Darden brothers, Liev Schreiber, Michel Hazanavicius, David Gordon Green, Wim Wenders and many more.

== Programmes ==
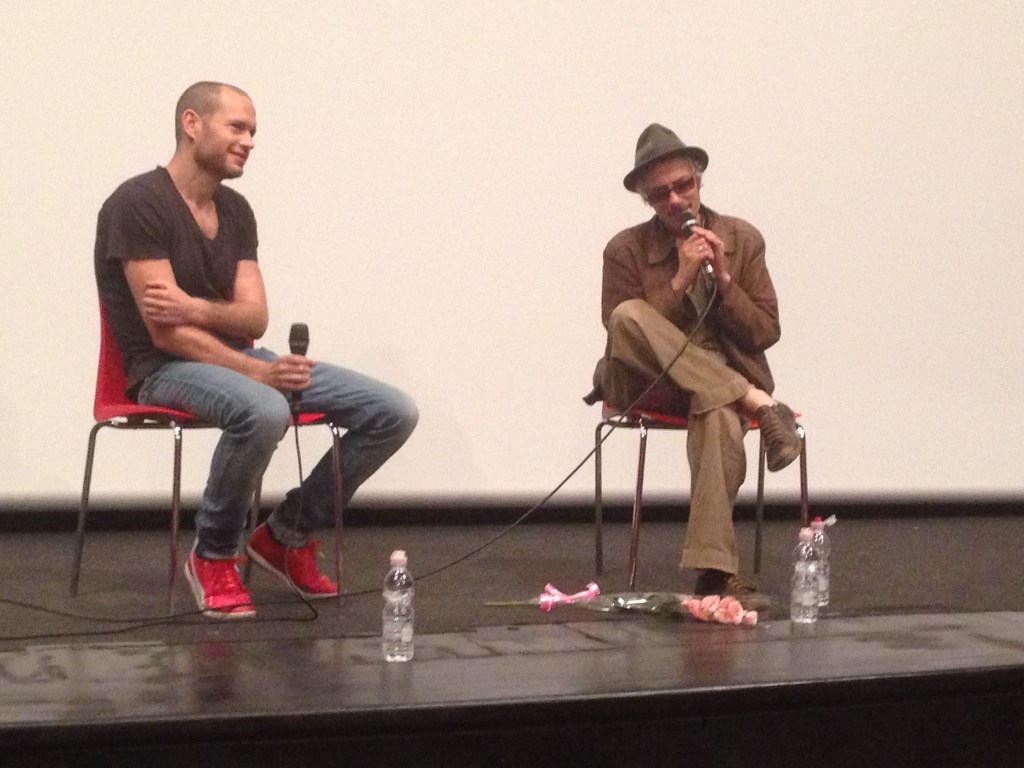
- Workshop with director Leos Carax, hosted by Nadav Lapid, 2014
  The international competition, which presents a selection of nearly 40 student films from around 50 countries and 70 film schools. Every festival, hundreds of students from all over the world travel to Tel Aviv, present their films in various competitions, and are hosted throughout the festival in the homes of Israeli students. The judges of the competition choose winners in 6 categories – the best film, the best documentary, the best animated / experimental film, the promising director, the best screenplay, and the best cinematography.
- The Israeli competition presents about 20 films from all film departments in the country. The competition was founded in 2000 and has become the most important of its kind in Israel. The films compete for awards in seven different categories – Best Picture, Best Documentary, Best Animated / Experimental Film, Best Screenplay, The Yariv Moore cinematography Prize and the Film Award for Promoting Social Change Initiated by the New Israel Fund and Audience Favorite Award.
- The Short Independent Film Competition is a platform for short films with the aim of encouraging contemporary cinematic visions. The competition aims to highlight the highest quality independent content produced in the past year. The competition encourages filmmakers to explore the boundaries of the medium, and to present personal, diverse, relevant and innovative cinema. The programme is intended for short films that were not made in an academic setting (not student films).
- The Digital Media International Exhibition & Competition presents projects created by students in the fields of virtual reality, interactive presentations, web platforms and artificial intelligence. The exhibition focuses on interactive and immersive experiences that explore the combination of creativity and technology with the help of the most advanced technologies. In 2021, 14 works were presented at the exhibition.
- The Experimental Film & Video Competition has been held since 2019. The competition is dedicated to works that are between plastic art and cinema. The aim of the competition is to present a new stage for young artists from the fields of video art and experimental cinema, who challenge the language of cinema in their work and formulate original and bold ways of expression.
- Mediterranean competition – between the years 2012 and 2013, the festival held the Mediterranean competition, in which about 20 student films from the countries of the Mediterranean Basin and the Middle East were shown. The aim of the competition is to showcase "other" cinema, Mediterranean and Arab, and to promote a cultural discourse between the neighboring countries. The first competition brought to Israel 15 young artists, including from Turkey, Morocco, the Palestinian Authority, Iran and Afghanistan.
  - Judging – The judging of the competitions is done by a panel of judges from the film industry of Israel and the world. Members of the judging panel in recent years have included Israeli directors Ari Folman, Gila Almagor, Moshe Mizrahi, Amos Gitai, Eran Kolirin, Gur Bentovich, Tawfiq Abu Wail (Atash (Thirst)), film critics Uri Klein, Yehuda Stav and Yael Shuv, as well as leading cinematographers, screenwriters and producers. International judges include Theo Angelopoulos, Leos Carax and many more.
  - Winners – Winners and participants of the festival in the past are now among the most important creators in Israel and around the world, including Dover Kosashvili and Nir Bergman, François Ozon, Thomas Winterberg, Nils Arden Oplev (Girl with a Dragon Tattoo), Alan Taylor (Game of Thrones) Todd Field and Mark Christopher.
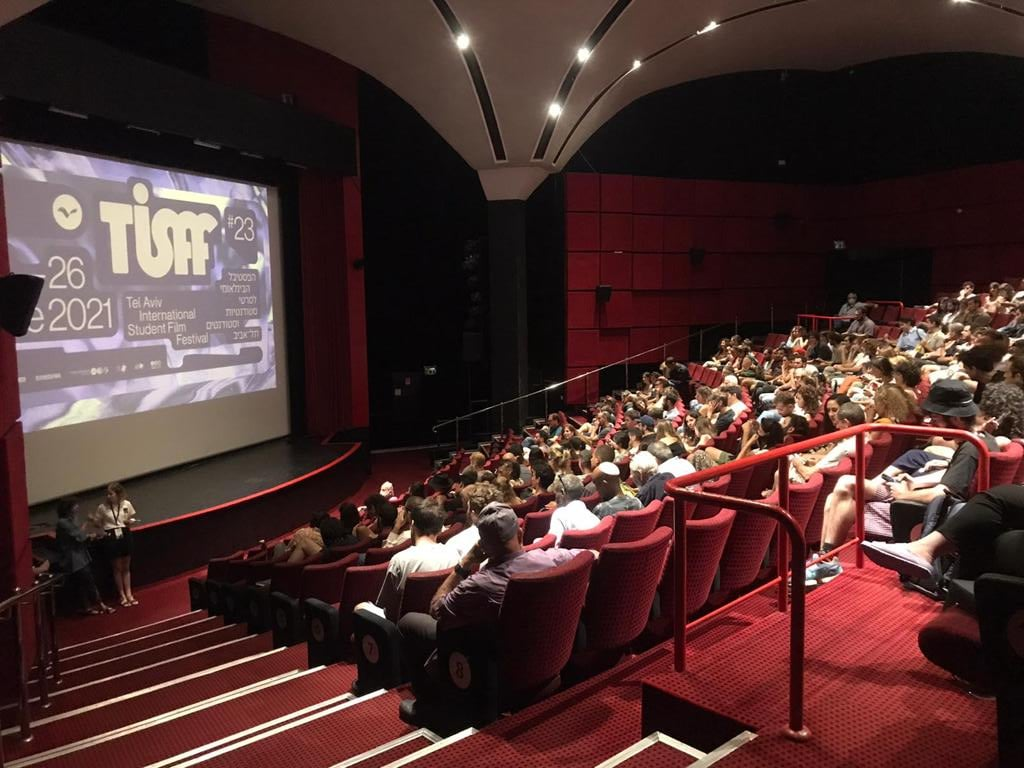
    A screening of the Israeli competition, 2021

== Additional events ==
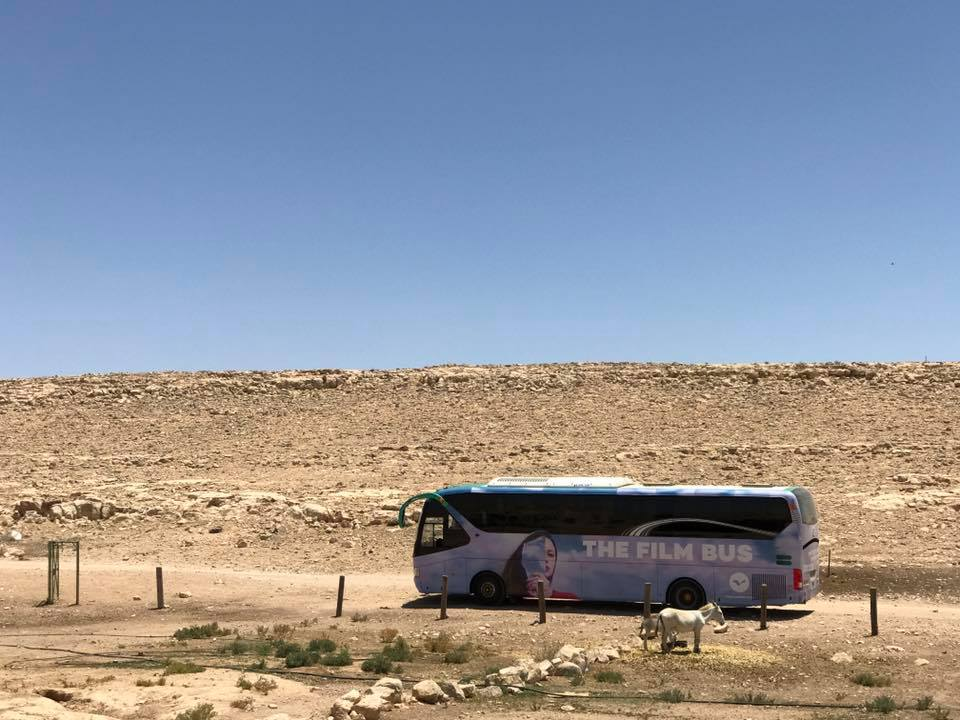
- The Film Bus project, 2021
  Workshops and Masterclasses – The festival invites many international guests each year, in addition to its student participants. Directors and producers come to Tel Avivto present their films at the festival and host master classes and professional workshops to the general public.
- The Film Bus – In 2012, the festival initiated the film bus project. The project aims to spread the cinematic endeavors throughout the country and hold an unmediated meeting between the student members of the project and the local residents through social events in the field of cinema. About 25 film students from around the country embark on a week-long journey on a bus equipped with a screen, projector and amplifier. Every day they hold local activities and an outdoor screening.
- Pitching Events -
  - "Short on the Road" – a joint initiative of the International Student Film Festival and the Gesher Foundation for Multicultural Cinema. The project is designed to strengthen the status of the short film and to support young filmmakers at the beginning of their professional path. Of the proposals submitted, about five projects receive development grants and mentoring for writing a script. At the pitching event, the creators present the scripts to judges, industry figures and the general public. Of these projects, two are awarded a production grant from the Gesher Foundation for Multicultural Cinema. The films produced will be premiered at the festival.
  - Short Animation – A production grant for a short independent animated film given by the Makor Foundation for Film and Television in collaboration with the International Film Festival. The Makor Foundation awards a production grant of 150,000 NIS to two chosen projects during the pitching event, which isheld in front of a panel of judges. The films produced will be premiered at the festival.
- "The Laboratory" - A series of practical workshops designed for young female filmmakers that take place at the International Film Festival in collaboration with the New Film and Television Foundation. The lab aims to support the creation of short feature films with a broad female perspective. During the festival week, filmmakers go through workshops in the fields of directing, casting and sound, accompanied by veteran filmmakers and industry figures.
- "Speed Dating" - The festival and the Producers' Association hold meetings between recent film school graduates and senior producers from the industry. The purpose of the meetings is to create connections and interface between producers looking for new projects and young creators. Each creator meets a number of senior producers for a short meeting in which he can present the project he is interested in producing in the field of film or television.
- Special gestures and screenings – The festival pays tribute to directors, festivals and various bodies in the field of cinema. Among other things, tributes were paid to director Paolo Sorrentino, to the new Romanian film, to the Clermont Fran film festival, and to the Cahiers du Cinéma magazine.
- Original Productions – The festival has produced two film series:
  - The Social Documentary Series – A series of short documentaries directed by students from the Steve Tisch Department of Film and Television at Tel Aviv University, dealing with social issues. The series is produced in collaboration with Channel 8 and the Rabinovich Foundation.
  - The Israeli-Palestinian cooperation – A series of feature and documentary films by young artists on both sides of the border. The creator of the project and its artistic director is Yael Perlov.
