= Polish Academy Award for Best Cinematography =

Annual film award category

The Polish Academy Award for Best Film Cinematography is an annual award given to the best Polish cinematography of the year.

== Winners and nominees ==
Year	Movie title	Cinematographer(s)
1999	Historia kina w Popielawach	Krzysztof Ptak
1999	Demony wojny wg Goi	Paweł Edelman
1999	Gniew	Łukasz Kośmicki
1999	Kroniki domowe	Paweł Edelman
1999	Nic	Artur Reinhart
1999	Zabić Sekala	Martin Štrba
2000	Pan Tadeusz	Paweł Edelman
2000	Dług	Bartosz Prokopowicz
2000	Egzekutor	Jarosław Szoda
2000	Królowa aniołów	Jolanta Dylewska
2000	Wojaczek	Adam Sikora
2001	Wrota Europy	Witold Sobociński
2001	Daleko od okna	Arkadiusz Tomiak
2001	Duże zwierzę	Paweł Edelman
2001	Prymas - trzy lata z tysiąca	Piotr Wojtowicz
2001	Życie jako śmiertelna choroba przenoszona drogą płciową	Edward Kłosiński
2002	Weiser	Krzysztof Ptak
2002	Angelus	Adam Sikora
2002	Boże skrawki	Paweł Edelman
2002	Cisza	Arkadiusz Tomiak
2002	Cześć, Tereska	Petro Aleksowski
2002	Człowiek wózków	Jacek Petrycki
2003	Pianista	Paweł Edelman
2003	Edi	Krzysztof Ptak
2003	Eukaliptus	Adam Sikora
2003	Głośniej od bomb	Jolanta Dylewska
2003	Tam i z powrotem	Piotr Wojtowicz
2004	Pornografia	Krzysztof Ptak
2004	Julia wraca do domu	Jacek Petrycki
2004	Zmruż oczy	Paweł Śmietanka Adam Bajerski
2005	Mój Nikifor	Krzysztof Ptak
2005	Pręgi	Marcin Koszałka
2005	Symetria	Arkadiusz Tomiak
2006	Jestem	Arthur Reinhart
2006	Rozdroże cafe	Andrzej Ramlau
2006	Skazany na bluesa	Grzegorz Kuczeriszka
2006	W dół kolorowym wzgórzem	Jolanta Dylewska
2007	Jasminum	Krzysztof Ptak
2007	Palimpsest	Arkadiusz Tomiak
2007	Wszyscy jesteśmy Chrystusami	Edward Kłosiński
2008	Katyń	Paweł Edelman
2008	Hania	Janusz Kamiński
2008	Pora umierać	Artur Reinhart
2008	Sztuczki	Adam Bajerski
2009	Cztery noce z Anną	Adam Sikora
2009	Boisko bezdomnych	Jacek Petrycki
2009	Chłopiec na galopującym koniu	Jolanta Dylewska
2010	Dom zły	Krzysztof Ptak
2010	Rewers	Marcin Koszałka
2010	Wojna polsko-ruska	Marian Prokop
2011	Wenecja	Artur Reinhart
2011	Essential Killing	Adam Sikora
2011	Las	Adam Sikora
2012	W ciemności	Jolanta Dylewska
2012	Młyn i krzyż	Lech Majewski Adam Sikora
2012	Róża	Piotr Sobociński Jr.
2013	Obława	Arkadiusz Tomiak
2013	Drogówka	Piotr Sobociński Jr.
2013	Jesteś Bogiem	Radosław Ładczuk
2014	Papusza	Krzysztof Ptak; Wojciech Staroń
2014	Ida	Ryszard Lenczewski Łukasz Żal
2014	Imagine	Adam Bajerski
2015	Bogowie	Piotr Sobociński Jr.
2015	Miasto 44	Marian Prokop
2015	Powstanie Warszawskie	Stefan Bagiński, Antoni Wawrzyniak, Andrzej Ancuta Roman Banach, Jerzy Gabryelski, Seweryn Kruszyński, Jerzy Zarzycki, Kazimierz Pyszkowski, Stanisław Bala, Ryszard Szope, Antoni Bohdziewicz, Edward Szope, Henryk Vlassak, Wacław Kaźmierczak
2016	Karbala	Arkadiusz Tomiak
2016	Fotograf	Arkadiusz Tomiak
2016	Czerwony pająk	Marcin Koszałka
2016	Body/Ciało	Michał Englert
2017	Wołyń	Piotr Sobociński Jr.
2017	Jestem mordercą	Paweł Dyllus
2017	Ostatna rodzina	Kacper Fertacz
2017	Letnie przesilenie	Jerzy Zieliński
2018	Zimna wojna	Łukasz Żal
2018	Ajka	Jolanta Dylewska
2018	Fuga	Jakub Kijowski
2019	Boże Ciało	Piotr Sobociński Jr.
2019	Mowa ptaków	Andrzej J. Jaroszewicz Marian Prokop
2019	Obywatel Jones	Tomasz Naumiuk
2019	Pan T	Adam Bajerski
2019	Ukryta gra	Paweł Edelman
2020	Jak najdalej stąd	Piotr Sobociński Jr.
2020	Śniegu już nigdy nie będzie	Michał Englert
2020	Interior	Paweł Flis
2020	Szarlatan	Martin Strba
2020	Zieja	Witold Płóciennik
2021	Wesele	Piotr Sobociński Jr.
2021	Furioza	Klaudiusz Dwulit
2021	Mistrz	Witold Płóciennik
2021	Teściowie	Michał Englert
2021	Wszystkie nasze strachy	Łukasz Gutt
2021	Żeby nie było śladów	Kacper Fertacz
2021	Żużel	Arthur Reinhart
2022	EO	Michał Dymek
2022	Broad Peak	Łukasz Gutt
2022	Chleb i sól	Tomasz Woźniczka
2022	Orzeł. Ostatni patrol	Jolanta Dylewska
2022	Silent Twins	Jakub Kijowski
2023	Filip	Michał Sobociński
2023	Doppelgänger. Sobowtór	Bartłomiej Kaczmarek
2023	Kos	Piotr Sobociński Jr.
2023	The Palace	Paweł Edelman
2023	Zielona granica	Tomasz Naumiuk
2024	The Girl with the Needle	Michał Dymek
2024	Minghun	Kacper Fertacz
2024	White Courage	Marcin Koszałka
2024	Woman Of...	Michał Englert
2024	The Zone of Interest	Łukasz Żal
