= Maciej Sobieszczański =

Polish film director and screenwriter (born 1966)

- Born: 1966 (age 59–60)
- Citizenship: Polish
- Occupations: Film director, screenwriter, lecturer

Maciej Andrzej Sobieszczański (born 1966) is a film director and screenwriter, lecturer at the Łódź Film School and Wajda School.

In 1999 he graduated in theatre studies from the Aleksander Zelwerowicz Theatre Academy in Warsaw.

== Filmography ==
- Prosta historia o miłości (2010), written by
- Performer (film) (2015), co-directed and co-written by
- Zgoda (film) (2017), directed and written by
- Brat (2024), directed and written by
- Przez ścianę (2026), directed and written by

== Awards ==
For the film Zgoda he received the award in the First Look section at the Locarno International Film Festival, the award for Best Director in the Main Competition at the 41st Montreal World Film Festival, and the Odkrywcze Oko (Eye of Discovery) award at the Polish Film Festival in America. For the film Brat he received the Ecumenical Jury Award at the 2025 Warsaw Film Festival.
