= Mateusz Więcławek =

Polish actor (born 1993)

- Born: 2 August 1993 (age 32); Radomsko, Łódź Voivodeship, Poland
- Occupation: Actor
- Years active: 2013–present

Mateusz Więcławek (born August 2, 1993) is a Polish actor.

== Life and career ==
Więcławek was born in Radomsko, Łódź Voivodeship and graduated from the Łódź Film School. He made his film debut playing major role in the 2014 drama The Word. He later was regular cast member on the television series The Teacher (2016) and The Trap (2018–2019). From 2019 to 2023 he starred in the BBC war drama series, World on Fire.

Więcławek starred in films All My Friends Are Dead (2020), The Wedding (2021), Nobody Sleeps in the Woods Tonight 2 (2021) and most notable Woman Of... (2023). In 2026 he starred in the HBO Max drama series, Proud.

== Filmography ==
=== Film ===
Year	Title	Role	Notes
2014	The Word	Janek Majchert	
2014	Stones for the Rampart	Gendarme	
2015	The Red Spider	Kamil's friend	
2016	A Simple Story About Murder	Krystian	
2013	Konwój	Dealer	
2017	Cicha noc	Marcin	
2017	Keep Watch	Jacek	
2018	Monument	Boy	
2018	Clergy	Senior Constable Borek	
2019	Ridge		
2019	The Resistance Fighter	Partisan	
2020	Adventures of a Mathematician	Adam Ulam	
2020	Zieja	Young Jan Zieja	
2020	All My Friends Are Dead	Filip	
2021	The Wedding	Young Antoni	
2021	Nobody Sleeps in the Woods Tonight 2	Adam Adamiec	
2022	Faithbreaker	Alko	
2023	Imago	Tomek	
2023	Woman Of...	young Aniela	
2023	Strawman	Bronek Budny	Nominated — Zbigniew Cybulski Award for Young Actor with an Outstanding Individuality
2023	All That Sex	Maks	

=== Television ===
Year	Title	Role	Notes
2013	The Deep Water	Kuba Nowicki	Episode: "Rozwiazanie"
2014	True law	Aleks	Episode: "5.4"
2016	The Teacher	Jasiek Molenda	10 episodes
2018—2019	The Trap	Kamil	13 episodes
2019—2023	World on Fire	Grzegorz Tomaszeski	13 episodes
2023	Absolute Beginners	Teo	Episode: "1.6"
2024	Simple Case	Marcin Wysocki 'Prosty'	6 episodes
2026	Proud	Pawel	8 episodes
