= Stosunki Międzynarodowe =

Stosunki Międzynarodowe (International Relations)
- Type: monthly journal
- Format: A4
- Owner: Instytut Badań nad Stosunkami Międzynarodowymi
- Editor: Tomasz Badowski
- Founded: 1999
- Language: Polish
- Headquarters: Warsaw
- ISSN: 1509-3077
- Website: http://www.stosunki.pl

Stosunki Międzynarodowe ("International Relations") is a monthly journal in Poland dedicated to international relations, foreign policy and diplomacy. It was founded on 1999 by Michał Sikorski. The editorial office is currently located in Warsaw. Stosunki Międzynarodowe has a circulation of 6,000 copies and is published by International Relations Research Institute in Warsaw (Instytut Badań nad Stosunkami Międzynarodowymi).
