= Jacek Murański =

Polish martial artist

- Born: December 12, 1968 (age 57); Wrocław, Poland
- Other names: Stary Muran
- Nationality: Polish
- Height: 5 ft 10 in (178 cm)
- Weight: 200 lb (91 kg; 14 st 4 lb)
- Division: Light heavyweight

Professional boxing record
- Total: 3
- Wins: 1
- Losses: 2
- By knockout: 1

Kickboxing record
- Total: 1
- Wins: 1
- By knockout: 1

Mixed martial arts record
- Total: 3
- Wins: 0
- Losses: 3
- By knockout: 1
- By decision: 1
- By disqualification: 1

Other information
- Occupation: Freak fighter, actor
- Children: Mateusz Murański
- Lethwei record: 0–1. Special rules record: 1–0. Last updated on: 22 February 2026

Jacek Murański (born 12 December 1968 in Poland) is a Polish boxer / mixed martial artist.

== Biography ==
Jacek Murański was born on 12 December 1968. He has stated that he grew up in Wrocław. He graduated in political science from the University of Warsaw. He obtained a master's degree.

He served a three-year prison sentence for assault. During questioning, he admitted guilt, but later, on the program Sprawa dla reportera, he claimed that he had been forced to make statements due to brutal treatment by the police.

He fought in Fame MMA, Clout MMA and Prime MMA. He also played minor acting roles.

He claimed that he had served in the French Foreign Legion, but there is no evidence confirming this.

== Role in the 2025 presidential election ==
Initially, he announced that he would run in the 2025 Polish presidential election, but ultimately did not register an electoral committee.

On 26 May 2025, he appeared on the 19.30 program on Telewizja Polska. Referring to former acquaintances, he accused presidential candidate Karol Nawrocki of illegal cooperation with MMA fighter Patryk Masiak, who allegedly used the nickname Wielki Bu. He alleged that they were involved in pimping. Murański declared that he was ready to defend his statements in court.

Murański's statement was quoted on Polsat News by Polish prime minister Donald Tusk.

Earlier, Onet.pl journalists Andrzej Stankiewicz and Jacek Harłukowicz described a similar version of events involving Karol Nawrocki. They later stated that Jacek Murański had not been their informant. They also challenged his version of events, pointing out that according to Murański the events were to have taken place in 2007, when Patryk Masiak was still a minor and could not have been involved in pimping.

Karol Nawrocki won the election with 50.89% of the vote.

== Fight records ==
=== MMA ===
Result	Record	Opponent (record before fight)	Method	Round	Event	Date	Location
Loss	0-3	(Poland) Robert Pasut (1–0)	TKO (punches on the ground)	2	Fame 16: Tromba vs. Dubiel	2022-11-05	(Poland) Gliwice
Loss	0-2	(Poland) Arkadiusz Tańcula (6–1)	Decision (unanimous)	5	Fame 15: Zemsta	2022-08-26	(Poland) Łódź
Loss	0-1	(Poland) Arkadiusz Tańcula (4–1)	Disqualification (multiple fouls, including biting and grabbing the cage fence)	4	Fame 12: Don Kasjo vs. Polish Zombie	2021-11-20	(Poland) Gdańsk/Sopot

=== Lethwei ===
Result	Record	Opponent	Method	Event	Date	Location
Loss	0-1	(Poland) Paweł Jóźwiak	Decision (unanimous)	Prime Show MMA 5	2023-07-01	(Poland) Wrocław

=== Kickboxing ===
Result	Record	Opponent	Method	Round	Event	Date	Location
Win	1-0	(Poland) Maciej Wiewiórka	TKO	1	Prime Show MMA 6	2023-10-21	(Poland) Toruń

=== Boxing ===
Result	Record	Opponent	Method	Round	Event	Date	Location
Loss	1-2	(Poland) Krzysztof Ryta	TKO	2	Prime Show MMA 14	2025-10-11	(Poland) Pruszków
Loss	1-1	(Poland) Natan Marcoń	Decision (split)	3	Prime Show MMA 12	2025-05-17	(Poland) Warsaw
Win	1-0	(Poland) Paweł Jóźwiak	Decision (split)	3	Prime Show MMA 7	2024-01-13	(Poland) Koszalin

=== Special rules ===
Result	Opponent	Method	Round	Event	Date	Location	Notes
Win	(Poland) Marcin Najman	TKO (unable to continue after the first knockdown)	1	Clout MMA 4	2024-03-09	(Poland) Łódź	Boxing in MMA gloves. Hammerfists, elbow strikes and headbutts allowed. Fourth round with no time limit and kicks, stomps, soccer kicks and ground strikes allowed. Co-main event.

== Filmography ==
=== Films ===
Year	Title	Role
2020	Asymetria	arguing man

=== Television series ===
Year	Title	Role	Notes
2023	Archiwista	Jan Czubaty	Episode 18
2023	Krucjata	prisoner	Episode 1
2021	Na sygnale	Stefan, Mateuszek's father	Episode 293
2021	Wojenne dziewczyny	undercover officer	Episode 40
2021	Pierwsza miłość	Remigiusz Sałek, boxing promoter	Episodes 3196, 3206, 3215, 3216
2020	Ojciec Mateusz	security guard	Episode 294; uncredited
2020	Na Wspólnej	owner	Episodes 3085–3087
2020	Klan	security employee at a guarded parking lot near the Tax Office in Warsaw, where Milda Pietkiewicz parked her car	Episode 3640
2019	Barwy szczęścia	local man	Episodes 2132, 2133
2019	Młody Piłsudski	guard	Episode 9
2018	Ślad	owner of a music centre in Wrocław, neighbor of Alicja Arszewska, participant in meetings of "Klub Anonimowych Żarłoków XXX", distributor of dinitrophenol slimming tablets, lover of Dariusz Trzaskowski	Episode 13

== Personal life ==
He is the father of Mateusz Murański.

In terms of political views, he describes himself as a nationalist and a statist.
