= World on Fire (TV series) =

British war drama series

- Genre: War drama
- Created by: Peter Bowker
- Starring: Jonah Hauer-King; Helen Hunt; Sean Bean; Lesley Manville; Julia Brown; Zofia Wichłacz; Brian J. Smith; Parker Sawyers; Blake Harrison; Ewan Mitchell; Ahad Raza Mir; Mateusz Więcławek; Eugénie Derouand; Mark Bonnar; Miriam Schiweck; Gregg Sulkin
- Composer: Dan Jones
- Country of origin: United Kingdom
- Original language: English
- No. of series: 2
- No. of episodes: 13

Production
- Executive producers: Peter Bowker; Damien Timmer; Helen Ziegler; Sheena Bucktowonsing; Charlotte Webber
- Producers: Nickie Sault (series 1); Callum Devrell-Cameron (series 1); Amanda Black (series 2); Angie Daniell (series 2)
- Cinematography: Søren Bay (series 1); Suzie Lavelle (series 1); Mika Orasmaa (series 1); John de Borman (series 1); Bastian Schiøtt (series 2); John Lee (series 2)
- Running time: 60 minutes
- Production company: Mammoth Screen Masterpiece

Original release
- Network: BBC One
- Release: 29 September 2019 – 20 August 2023

World on Fire is a British war drama television series created by Peter Bowker. Set in World War II, the series follows the intertwined lives of ordinary civilians across Europe who are caught up in the conflict.

On 12 February 2024, it was announced that World on Fire had been cancelled by the BBC.

== Overview ==
The first series covers March 1939 to July 1940, and features visits to Paris, Warsaw, Manchester, Berlin and Dunkirk. It details events such as the Defence of the Polish Post Office in Danzig, the Battle of the River Plate, the Dunkirk evacuation and the Battle of Britain.

The second series covers October 1940 to May 1941 and features the beginning of The Blitz in Manchester and the North African campaign (including Operation Compass and the Siege of Tobruk) while also returning to occupied France and Nazi Germany, with the resistance movement and Lebensborn program being shown, respectively.

== Cast and characters ==
=== Main ===
- Jonah Hauer-King as Harry Chase, an interpreter at the British embassy in Warsaw who is later commissioned into the British Army, and joins the SOE.
- Helen Hunt (series 1) as Nancy Campbell, an American journalist struggling to broadcast the truth from Berlin.
- Sean Bean (series 1) as Douglas Bennett, a bus conductor, pacifist and shell-shocked veteran of the Battle of the Somme, and father to Lois and Tom.
- Lesley Manville as Robina Chase, Harry's wealthy and emotionally repressed mother.
- Julia Brown as Lois Bennett, a 21-year-old factory worker and talented singer who later joins the Entertainments National Service Association. In series two, Lois is an ambulance driver.
- Zofia Wichłacz as Kasia Tomaszeski, a waitress from Warsaw, with whose family Harry lodges, who later joins the Polish Resistance
- Brian J. Smith (series 1) as Webster O'Connor, a gay American doctor based in Paris and Nancy's nephew.
- Parker Sawyers as Albert Fallou, a Parisian jazz saxophonist and Webster's lover.
- Blake Harrison as Sergeant Stan Raddings, Harry's platoon sergeant.
- Ewan Mitchell as Tom Bennett, Lois's older brother, a petty criminal who later joins the Royal Navy.
- Mateusz Więcławek as Grzegorz Tomaszeski, Kasia's sickly younger brother who joins the Polish army with his father.
- Eugénie Derouand as Henriette Guilbert, a nurse at Webster's hospital in Paris, secretly Jewish.
- Mark Bonnar (series 2) as Sir James Danemere, a civil servant who is billeted at the Chase house.
- Ahad Raza Mir (series 2) as Rajib Pal, the captain of a sapper unit in the British Indian Army that is stationed in North Africa.
- Miriam Schiweck (series 2) as Marga Kühne, a 16-year-old German schoolgirl and member of the League of German Girls.
- Gregg Sulkin (series 2) as David, a Jewish RAF fighter pilot stationed in Manchester.

=== Supporting ===
- Yrsa Daley-Ward as Connie Knight, a close friend, colleague and musical partner of Lois.
- Eryk Biedunkiewicz as Jan Tomaszeski, Kasia's youngest brother, a schoolboy.
- Cel Spellman as Private Joe Broughton, a member of Harry's Platoon from Leeds.
- Benedict Taylor (series 1) as Dr Drake, head of a mental hospital in Manchester.
- Jonathan McGuiness (series 1) as Sir Oswald Mosley, the leader of the British Union of Fascists.
- Tomasz Kot (series 1) as Stefan Tomaszeski, a veteran of World War I and father of Kasia, Jan and Grzegorz, who rejoins the Polish army.
- Patrick Kennedy (series 1) as Campbell, the captain of HMS Exeter.
- Matthew Romain (series 1) as Geoff, a shellshocked soldier Harry encounters in France.
- Prasanna Puwanarajah (series 1) as Major Taylor, a commander of the Special Operations Executive.
- Charlie Creed-Miles (series 1) as David Walker, Harry's superior at the Warsaw embassy.
- Buom Tihngang (series 1) as Demba, a Senegalese soldier whom Harry meets in France.
- Agata Kulesza (series 1) as Maria Tomaszeski, Stefan's wife and mother of Kasia, Grzegorz and Jan.
- Jack Deam (series 1) as Ted, manager of Lois and Connie's ENSA unit.
- Benjamin Wainwright (series 1) as Randy O'Connor, an American fighter pilot in Vernon's squadron and Webster's brother.
- Helene Grass (series 1) as Frau Pessler, one of Uwe's employees, a committed Nazi.
- Bruno Alexander (series 1) as Klaus Rossler, Claudia and Uwe's son, a German soldier.
- Arthur Darvill (series 1) as Wing Commander Vernon Hunter, an RAF fighter pilot.
- Matthew Aubrey (series 1) as Private Taffy Morgan, a member of Harry's platoon.
- Borys Szyc (series 1) as Konrad, a Polish army soldier.
- Ansu Kabia (series 1) as Eddie Knight, Connie's husband, a jazz trumpeter.
- Dora Zyogouri (series 1) as Hilda Rossler, the epileptic daughter of Claudia and Uwe.
- Tomasz Ziętek (series 1) as Tomasz, a colleague of Kasia in the resistance.
- Victoria Mayer (series 1) as Claudia Rossler, a German mother living in Berlin, struggling to contain the secret of her daughter's epilepsy.
- Johannes Zeiler (series 1) as Uwe Rossler, Claudia's husband who runs a textile firm.
- Max Riemelt as (series 1) Schmidt, Nancy's Nazi censor and minder in Berlin.
- Arthur Choisnet (series 2) as Luc, a communist university student and Henriette's brother.
- Grace Chilton (series 2) as Joyce Spicer, the housekeeper of the Chase household.
- Forrest Bothwell (series 2) as George, a young Northern Irish soldier stationed in North Africa.
- Jonathan Harden (series 2) as Captain Briggs, the commanding officer of the British platoon stationed in Egypt and Libya.
- James Backway (series 2) as Gordon, an RAF commanding officer.
- Jake Douglas (series 2) as Stephen, an RAF pilot.
- Geraint Downing (series 2) as Shortbread, an RAF fighter pilot and friend of David.
- Matthias Lier (series 2) as Herr Kühne, Marga's father who tries to protect her from the Nazis.
- Friederike Ott (series 2) as Frau Kühne, Marga's mother.
- Carl Grübel (series 2) as Ralf Kühne, Marga's brother and a Luftwaffe bomber.
- Beat Marti (series 2) as Herr Trutz, Marga and Gertha's school teacher.
- Jay Sajjid (series 2) as Ishwar, an Indian soldier in Rajib's unit.
- Johanna Götting (series 2) as Gertha, the best friend of Marga who is strongly opposed to the Lebensborn programme.
- Andreas Schröders (series 2) as Dr Kommandant, a Lebensborn doctor.
- Inga Dietrich (series 2) as Astrid Mutti, an employee who works at a Lesbensborn site in Brandenburg
- Kevin Kiernan-Molloy (series 2) as Sollo, an Australian soldier serving in North Africa.
- Agnieszka Podsiadlik (series 2) as Irena Lewandowska, a Polish refugee from Warsaw living in Manchester.
- Ben Allen (series 2) as Tam, an MI5 operative.
- Eric Godon (series 2) as Monsieur Berthaud, an elderly French man who aids the resistance.
- Béatrice De Staël (series 2) as Madame Berthaud, an elderly French woman who, along with her husband, aids the resistance.
- Lily Sacofsky (series 2) as Pearl, an ATS worker at the desert hospital in Cairo.

== Episodes ==
=== Series overview ===
| Series | Episodes | Originally released | | Average UK viewers (millions) |
| Series | Episodes | First released | Last released | Average UK viewers (millions) |
|---|---|---|---|---|
| 1 | 7 | 29 September 2019 | 10 November 2019 | 5.73 |
| 2 | 6 | 16 July 2023 | 20 August 2023 | 3.50 |

=== Series 1 (2019) ===
| No. overall | No. in series | Title | Directed by | Written by | Original release date | Viewers (millions) (Note: 7-day ratings.) |
|---|---|---|---|---|---|---|
| 1 | 1 | Episode 1 | Adam Smith | Peter Bowker | 29 September 2019 | 6.30 |
1939. As the threat of the Nazi regime looms large over Europe, translator Harry Chase vows to help his Polish lover Kasia Tomaszeski flee Warsaw, but also has his sweetheart Lois Bennett waiting for him at home in Manchester. Meanwhile, American journalist and broadcaster Nancy Campbell is at the Polish–German border, witnessing the start of the German invasion of Poland. In Paris, Nancy's nephew, surgeon Webster O'Connor, finds the distant threat of war on his doorstep as he falls for French–African jazz musician Albert Fallou, who has been beaten up by the Action Française mob.
| 2 | 2 | Episode 2 | Adam Smith | Peter Bowker | 6 October 2019 | 5.46 |
In devastated Warsaw, Kasia makes plans to flee with grief-stricken mother Maria Tomaszeski but gets caught in a resistance cell's attack on German soldiers. Harry returns to Manchester. When he finally plucks up the courage to tell Lois the truth about Warsaw, she disarms him by declaring her love. Harry then travels to London where he's dismissed from the diplomatic services because of his conduct in Warsaw. Tom Bennett shocks father Douglas by announcing he is now a conscientious objector, while in Berlin Nancy is frustrated by the growing power of the censor. In Paris, Webster and Albert are deeply in love, but their joy is overshadowed by the growing threat of prejudice they face. Nancy finds out that her neighbour's daughter has epilepsy.
| 3 | 3 | Episode 3 | Thomas Napper | Peter Bowker | 13 October 2019 | 5.37 |
After enlisting in the navy, Tom finds himself on board HMS Exeter in pursuit of the notorious Graf Spee, a German pocket battleship which has been picking off British merchant ships for months. A huge naval battle ensues, and Tom's moral compass is reset as he watches the carnage and death around him. Harry is now a 2nd lieutenant, and is in France with the BEF, supervising the digging of foxholes and tank traps with his sergeant Stan Raddings, while trying to win the respect of his unit. When Lois arrives at the base camp to perform with ENSA, she is determined to ignore him and ends up kissing another soldier, Joe. Harry searches for her and punches Joe who cannot retaliate because Harry is his senior officer. Harry later finds out that Lois is pregnant. Nancy hears of disabled and 'feeble-minded' children going missing. She speaks to a doctor who says he ends 'their suffering'. She warns her neighbours but the husband thinks she has taken the risk of exposing them to the authorities by coming to their flat.
| 4 | 4 | Episode 4 | Andy Wilson | Peter Bowker | 20 October 2019 | 5.44 |
The phoney war is over. Harry and his unit are fighting in the town of Louvain, where German troops outnumber those of the Allied forces. Harry wants to prove himself as a leader, but when the Nazis close in, he freezes. On the road to refuge Grzegorz Tomaszeski and Konrad wake to see a German soldier nearby. They shoot him and run. Back in Warsaw, Kasia and Tomas's Polish resistance activity has consequences as the Germans kill dozens in retaliation for the murder of an officer. In Paris, Webster is shocked to see the rise of anti-Semitism in the city, when a Jewish couple come seeking help. Despite hospital policy, nurse Henriette persuades him to look after them, revealing that she too is Jewish. In Manchester, Douglas guesses Lois is hiding her pregnancy. Tom's return brings momentary relief until he confesses that he plans to desert the Navy. Douglas tells him not to; prison will be worse. Nancy submits her script to Schmidt for censorship, and he is incredulous that she hopes to broadcast the euthanasia story. Schmidt threatens her: she won't if she values the Rosslers' daughter.
| 5 | 5 | Episode 5 | Chanya Button | Peter Bowker | 27 October 2019 | 5.99 |
As thousands flee Nazi-occupied Belgium, Harry, Stan and the rest of their unit take the road to be evacuated out of Dunkirk. They reach a field hospital and find an overwhelmed Webster O'Connor dealing with an endless number of injured soldiers and civilians. Having stumbled across an ambulance of shell-shocked, traumatised troops (including Senegalese soldiers Demba and Ibrahim), Harry decides to stay with them until it is quieter and he can help them to the beach. In Warsaw, Kasia's campaign of fighting and eradicating Germans has become routine, whilst her comrade has become shaky. In Manchester, Lois and Connie are performing with ENSA at a northern airbase. Tom, now serving on HMS Keith, is reported missing at Dunkirk. Lois meets Wing Commander Vernon Hunter who is immediately drawn to Lois. On saying goodbye, he promises to write to her. In Berlin the Rosslers are growing ever more fearful for Hilda and mother and daughter hide out at their summer residence for a time.
| 6 | 6 | Episode 6 | Chanya Button | Peter Bowker | 3 November 2019 | 5.91 |
June 1940. The Nazis have taken Paris. Webster and Albert's life becomes precarious. A German officer warns them that jazz music is to be banned and Albert is at risk of being seen as subversive. In Berlin, Mr and Mrs Rossler are arrested for neglecting their patriotic duty of handing their daughter to the authorities. Back in Manchester, Harry returns home with Demba, one of the heroic Senegalese troops who stayed by Harry's side at Dunkirk. And in Warsaw, Kasia's courageous resistance continues. Tomasz is shot and Kasia is arrested. Harry is invited to London for an interview.
| 7 | 7 | Episode 7 | Andy Wilson | Peter Bowker | 10 November 2019 | 5.70 |
Now part of the Special Operations Executive, Harry is about to embark on his first mission. Major Taylor tells him he must leave for Poland to assist a resistance group who have been identified and targeted by the Nazis. Meanwhile, in Warsaw Kasia is led to the gallows until a bomb explodes amongst the watching crowds and she is rescued by comrades. Lois welcomes a baby daughter into the world, and Robina breaks the news to Harry that he is now a father. This spurs Harry to head to the Bennett house, where he is met by Douglas, who warns him to stay away. Lois goes to the RAF base to meet Vernon, intending to decline his proposal. His plane is the last to return and she thinks he may be dead, so on seeing him, she accepts. Harry parachutes into Poland, landing behind enemy lines. Putting his language and military skills to the test, he meets his Polish liaison. He is led to a barn the network is using, and is at last reunited with Kasia. But the network is ambushed by the Germans and only Harry and Kasia escape. She saves his life shooting dead a soldier and they enter a forest.

=== Series 2 (2023) ===
| No. overall | No. in series | Title | Directed by | Written by | Original release date | Viewers (millions) (Note: 7-day ratings.) |
|---|---|---|---|---|---|---|
| 8 | 1 | Episode 1 | Drew Casson | Peter Bowker | 16 July 2023 | 3.85 |
In Manchester, Harry and Kasia arrive at Robina's house, having escaped Poland safely. Kasia and Jan meet with Grzegorz for tea, but they are insulted by a man whom Kasia punches out of anger, as she longs to return to Poland. Tom returns home to find that his house has been destroyed by a bomb which killed Douglas. He expresses anger at Lois, who was unharmed since she was working at her new job as an ambulance driver. Lois also grieves the death of Vernon, who was killed in the Battle of Britain, and struggles to adapt to motherhood with her newborn baby, Vera. Meanwhile, in Nazi Germany, 16 year-old schoolgirl and League of German Girls member Marga Kühne is selected to participate in the Lebensborn program, much to the disapproval of her teacher, Herr Trutz, and best friend Gertha. In Egypt, Stan is tasked with working with Lieutenant Rajib Pal of the British Indian Army and his sapper unit. During an air raid, rebellious Jewish fighter pilot David witnesses the death of his squad-mate "Shortbread", while Lois is injured by collapsing debris.
| 9 | 2 | Episode 2 | Barney Cokeliss | Peter Bowker | 23 July 2023 | 3.45 |
In the Sahara Desert, Harry returns to war and is reunited with Stan and Joe, as Operation Compass begins. He bonds with Rajib due to their similar rank, however conditions begin to deteriorate, and Joe is killed in a sandstorm. Lois and Tom visit Douglas's grave, and Lois confesses her desire to leave Manchester. She shares this with Kasia, who admits her own wish to return to Poland. Civil Servant Sir James Danemere is billeted at the Chase house and uses his influence to have the charges against Kasia for the tearoom incident dropped. David is confronted by his commanding officer Gordon about his lack of grief shown for Shortbread and others who died. At the American Hospital of Paris, Henriette is under pressure due to tighter restrictions enforced by the Nazis, worsened when her younger brother, Luc, is captured. Delivering supplies to interned prisoners, she speaks with Albert, who offers to help Luc escape but insists she should leave Paris. In Berlin, Marga and Gertha clash over the former's decision to participate in the Lebensborn program, leading Marga to inform the authorities. During interrogation, Gertha is forced to give up Herr Trutz in order to save her parents. Lois sees a poster calling for Auxiliary Territorial Service ambulance drivers and tells Robina that she will join the ATS in Cairo. Fighting off an air raid on Christmas Eve, David witnesses another squad mate, Steven, being shot down. The next morning, Lois leaves Vera at the door of the Chase house and leaves.
| 10 | 3 | Episode 3 | Meenu Gaur | Matt Jones | 30 July 2023 | 3.53 |
In Libya, Harry collapses due to a wound and is sent to a desert hospital in Cairo. Meanwhile, Stan and Rajib attempt to evacuate to Tobruk but their truck is ambushed, forcing them to flee. They steal a Jeep from a group of German soldiers and later capture a lone German soldier. Kasia sneaks into Sir James' room and finds radio equipment, false identification, and a handgun, which she steals to confront him. He admits he is a member of military intelligence. In Brandenburg, Marga arrives at the Lebensborn site. After inspection by a doctor, she catches the eye of Sturmbannfuhrer Greiser, whom she accepts as her partner. They have sex, and she sobs afterwards. David takes on a dangerous mission to identify German gun positions in Northern France but is shot down and is forced to flee from soldiers while severely wounded. At the Fort de Romainville prison, Albert and Luc use morphine smuggled in by Henriette to get themselves into the infirmary. At the infirmary, Albert helps Luc escape, but Albert becomes fearful of escaping and ultimately decides to stay. Sir James offers Kasia a job working to root out enemy agents, which she immediately accepts. In Egypt as part of her ATS service, Lois finds Harry at the hospital. She confesses her previous suicidal thoughts, and they bond over how the war has affected them. After running out of fuel, Stan, Rajib and their prisoner stumble to the nearest outpost. Despite being a British officer, Rajib is only offered water when Stan demands it, after seeing the German prisoner also being given water.
| 11 | 4 | Episode 4 | Drew Casson | Rachel Bennette | 6 August 2023 | 3.38 |
In Tobruk, Rajib clashes with a fellow soldier, Ishwar, who accuses him of being sympathetic to the British, as well as Captain Briggs, who ignores Rajib's suggestions and refuses to salute him until confronted. Harry and the rest of the squad meet up with Australian soldiers, and they narrowly avoid death from a German panzer division. In Manchester, Kasia is given her first assignment at MI5, to trail a Polish woman, Irena Lewandowska, who is suspected of being a spy. They meet in a park and Irena invites Kasia to her home, where they bond over the horrors of life in Warsaw. Kasia returns to MI5 to deny the claims, however she is pressured to continue investigating, and finds sketches of floor plans in the park, confirming Irena's role as a spy. She speaks with Sir James about this, which Robina mistakenly sees as a romance and confronts her. In Germany, Marga, now pregnant, faints during a ceremony and is prescribed bed rest to avoid a miscarriage. Greiser brings flowers to Marga, but when she asks for his name he declares they are for the baby, and he scolds her when she asks if he cares about her. In France, Henriette, having helped two other British airmen escape, stumbles upon David, whom she helps. She is visited by a German soldier, who offers to protect her if she will accept his advances. David and Henriette escape, and hide in a barn owned by an elderly couple.
| 12 | 5 | Episode 5 | Meenu Gaur | Rachel Bennette | 13 August 2023 | 3.39 |
Following the destruction of their water distillery, Harry orders his men to search for a well. They are ambushed by German soldiers, one of whom shoots Stan in the head, killing him instantly. Irena is taken in by MI5 and interrogated by Kasia. She reveals she is working for the Germans to protect her son, who has been captured, and rejects Kasia's offer to work for MI5. Kasia accompanies Irena home and tries to convince her to work for MI5. Kasia wakes the next day to find that Irena has committed suicide. While hiding, David and Henriette bond with each other. They dance and share a kiss, before being moved. Stan's killer is captured and taunts Harry and his men. He is forced to dig Stan's grave, and after an intense confrontation, Harry kills him. Kasia is disturbed when Sir James says that Irena's death will enable MI5 to continue to make drops in Irena's place. They clash at dinner, and Robina demands to know what is going on between them. Kasia reveals everything about their work at MI5. Sir James explains his insensitivity to Irena's death by describing his experiences in the First World War. He apologises to Robina for lying about his occupation. She responds that Kasia belongs at home and not as a spy. She demands that Kasia give up her role at MI5, and Kasia agrees. Lois encounters a native mother who has died, and looks after her baby before taking him to an orphanage. She suffers a nightmare featuring Vera's death, and decides to return home. Rajib confronts Harry for the war crime of killing the German prisoner and tells him he needs to step up as a leader.
| 13 | 6 | Episode 6 | Barney Cokeliss | Peter Bowker | 20 August 2023 | 3.40 |
Harry is evacuated and returns to England, bringing Stan’s farewell letter to his wife. He arrives home and is greeted by Kasia and Robina. When Lois arrives to pick up Vera, Robina refuses to let her go, but Harry supports Lois as Vera’s mother. After taking David to be picked up by the resistance, Henriette is captured by a German patrol. She is taken to Fort de Romainville, where Albert tells her she will be taken to Ravensbrück camp in Germany and will probably be killed. She is determined to escape, and Albert gives her money and a weapon to take with her. Marga sneaks out of the hospital and returns home. When her parents say she should marry her baby’s father, she insists that carrying the baby for the Führer makes her child legitimate. When her brother Ralf, home on leave, is told of Marga’s pregnancy he expresses his pride, comparing her sacrifice to those of his fellow soldiers. Robina admits that she loves Vera and tells Harry of Kasia’s work for MI5. He confronts Sir James, who tells him that Kasia volunteered to help him and wants to return to Poland. Kasia tells Harry he has to let her go and leaves the next morning. Back in Africa, Rajib recovers from serious injuries and is told by Ishwar that the other soldiers were all killed by two Germans Rajib was trying to negotiate with. They agree that, after the war, they will need to fight together for India’s freedom. Robina declines Sir James’s marriage proposal and is confronted by Harry, who insists she tell him about his father’s suicide. He implicitly compares his father’s inability to face what he’d done in the first war with his own desperation, which Robina refuses to address. Arriving at his RAF base, David meets with Grzegorz. Later on he is seen lighting the Sabbath candles and saying Sabbath prayers before taking off on another flight. Harry sits with Lois and Vera before leaving to rejoin the army. Kasia parachutes back into Poland.

== Production ==
=== Series one ===
The series was commissioned by the BBC in October 2017, with Peter Bowker writing. Casting began in October 2018, with Helen Hunt and Lesley Manville amongst the first additions, with Sean Bean joining in November. Filming began in November 2018, and wrapped in March 2019. Locations included Chester, Liverpool, Prague, Lytham St. Annes, Wigan and Lyme Park.

=== Series two ===
The second series began filming in July 2022 in Belfast, following a long delay due to the COVID-19 pandemic. It was confirmed for six episodes written by Bowker, Rachel Bennette and Matt Jones. Lesley Manville, Jonah Hauer-King, Julia Brown, Zofia Wichłacz, Blake Harrison, Eugénie Derouand, Eryk Biedunkiewicz, Yrsa Daley-Ward, Parker Sawyers, Ewan Mitchell and Cel Spellman were all confirmed to be returning, while Mark Bonnar, Ahad Raza Mir, Miriam Schiweck and Gregg Sulkin joined the main cast. Filming wrapped in September, with additional filming occurring the following December. Sean Bean was unable to return because of scheduling conflicts, while Helen Hunt and Brian J. Smith did not return because they did not fit within the story, though Bowker hoped they could return in future series because of 1942 being the beginning of American involvement in the war.

== Broadcast and release ==
The first series was first broadcast in the United Kingdom on BBC One on 29 September 2019, and concluded on 10 November. In the United States, it premiered on Masterpiece on 5 April 2020 and concluded on 17 May.

The second series was first broadcast also on BBC One, on 16 July 2023, and concluded on 20 August. All episodes were immediately available on BBC iPlayer on 16 July. In the United States, the second series premiered on Masterpiece on 15 October 2023 and ended on 19 November.

== Reception ==
The first series was given four out of five by Lucy Mangan of The Guardian. The historical accuracy of some elements of the series, however, was criticised by reviewers, including columnist Peter Hitchens. On Rotten Tomatoes, the first series holds an approval rating of 84% based on 31 reviews, with an average critic rating of 7.6/10. The website's critical consensus reads “Though at times more style than substance, World on Fire's layered storytelling never steps on itself, leaving room for its excellent ensemble and gorgeous set-pieces to fill in any narrative gaps.” On Metacritic, it has a weighted average score of 74 out of 100, based on reviews from 12 critics, indicating "generally favorable reviews".

The second series was given four out of five by Rebecca Nicholson of The Guardian. On Rotten Tomatoes, the second series holds an approval rating of 100% based on eight reviews, with an average critic rating of 7.2/10. On Metacritic, it has a weighted average score of 70 out of 100, based on reviews from four critics, indicating "generally favorable reviews".
