= Warsaw 44 =

2014 film by Jan Komasa

- Film poster
- Directed by: Jan Komasa
- Written by: Jan Komasa
- Produced by: Michał Kwieciński
- Starring: Józef Pawłowski; Zofia Wichłacz; Anna Próchniak
- Cinematography: Marian Prokop
- Edited by: Michał Czarnecki
- Music by: Antoni Komasa-Łazarkiewicz
- Release date: 2 August 2014
- Running time: 122 minutes
- Country: Poland
- Languages: Polish, German
- Box office: $ 7,795,076

Warsaw 44 (Polish: Miasto 44, lit. 'City 44') is a 2014 Polish drama war film written and directed by Jan Komasa. It depicts the 1944 Warsaw Uprising during the German occupation of Poland.

In the summer of 1944, the Red Army advances from the east in the direction of Warsaw and the Polish underground Home Army (AK) launches a revolt against the occupiers. A young AK soldier, Stefan (Józef Pawłowski), joins the armed uprising. He loves the nurse Ala (Zofia Wichłacz), but also has feelings for another AK member called Kama (Anna Próchniak). A story of love and friendship unveils during the bloody and brutal reality of the uprising as the resistance is crushed with a massive death toll and most of the city destroyed.

== Plot ==
Stefan is a teenage activist who assists the Polish Armia Krajowa resistance movement in the Nazi-occupied Warsaw, keeping it a secret from his mother, a mentally unwell widow of a killed Polish military officer. After being nearly caught, and losing his job at Wedel's, he goes out to the countryside where he meets Ala, who has swum out to an island in a lake that she refuses to leave. Stefan is attracted to Ala, who feels the same about him. Together with her and his other friends, Stefan joins the AK's Kedyw force, which upsets his mother. Ala comes from a wealthy szlachta noble family and over their opposition decides to go to Warsaw to join Operation Tempest.

When the Warsaw Uprising begins on 1 August 1944, Stefan joins in the fighting, participating in an early local success of capturing a military warehouse in the Wola district and liberating a group of Jewish Gęsiówka labor camp prisoners. Ala, as "Biedronka" ("Ladybug"), works as a military nurse. Ala's working class rival, "Kama", another girl forming a love triangle, is Stefan's childhood friend serving as a dispatch runner.

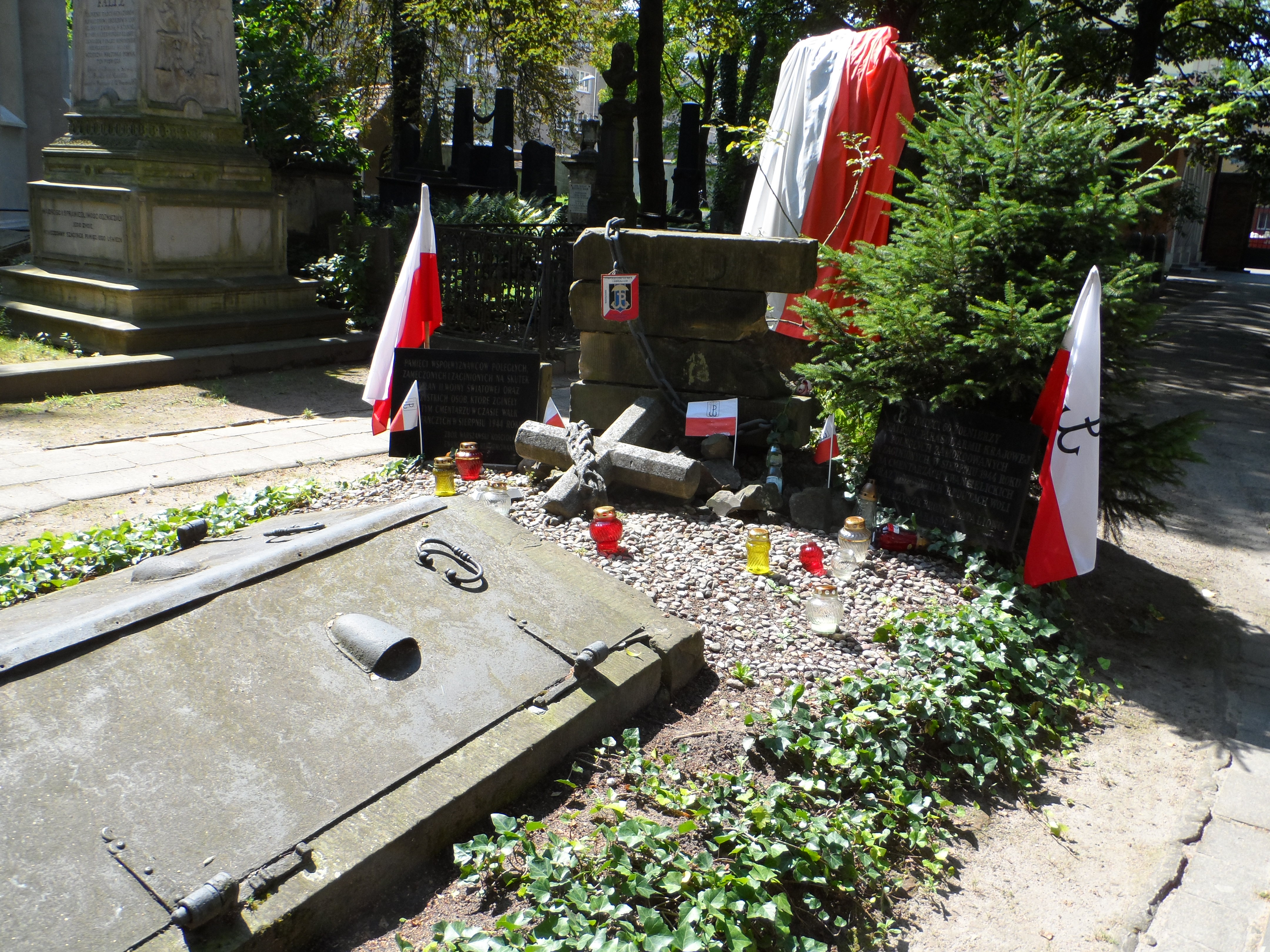
Memorial to the fallen of the Kedyw Parasol Battalion at the Calvinist Cemetery in 2014

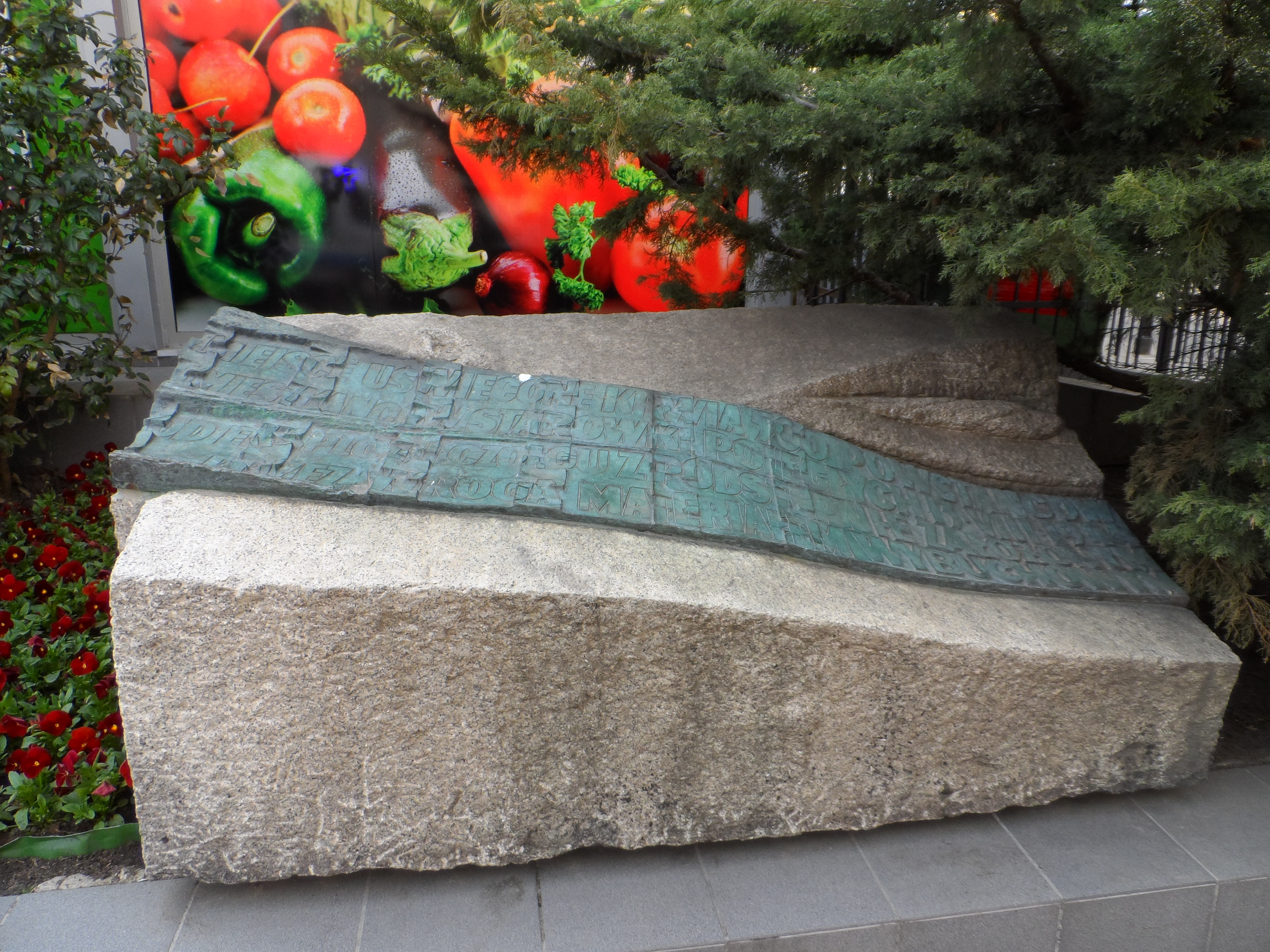
The explosion site memorial in 2013

Stefan is assigned to non-combat duty in another Kedyw unit as punishment for failing as a night sentry. After he is shot trough the chest in a disastrous fight with German reinforcements of Reinefarth at the Calvinist Cemetery during the defense of the Wola cemeteries that has his unit wiped out, and soon afterwards witnesses his mother and little brother being executed by the SS during the Wola Massacre, he becomes near-catatonic. Luckily, he is reunited with Ala, who deserts for the sake of Stefan to rescue him from a bombed hospital. She then repeatedly saves him as the Old Town is destroyed, including surviving a hellish evacuation through the sewer system and a devastating explosion that killed hundreds. Meanwhile, the dreaded SS penal unit Dirlewanger is unleashed against the people of Warsaw.

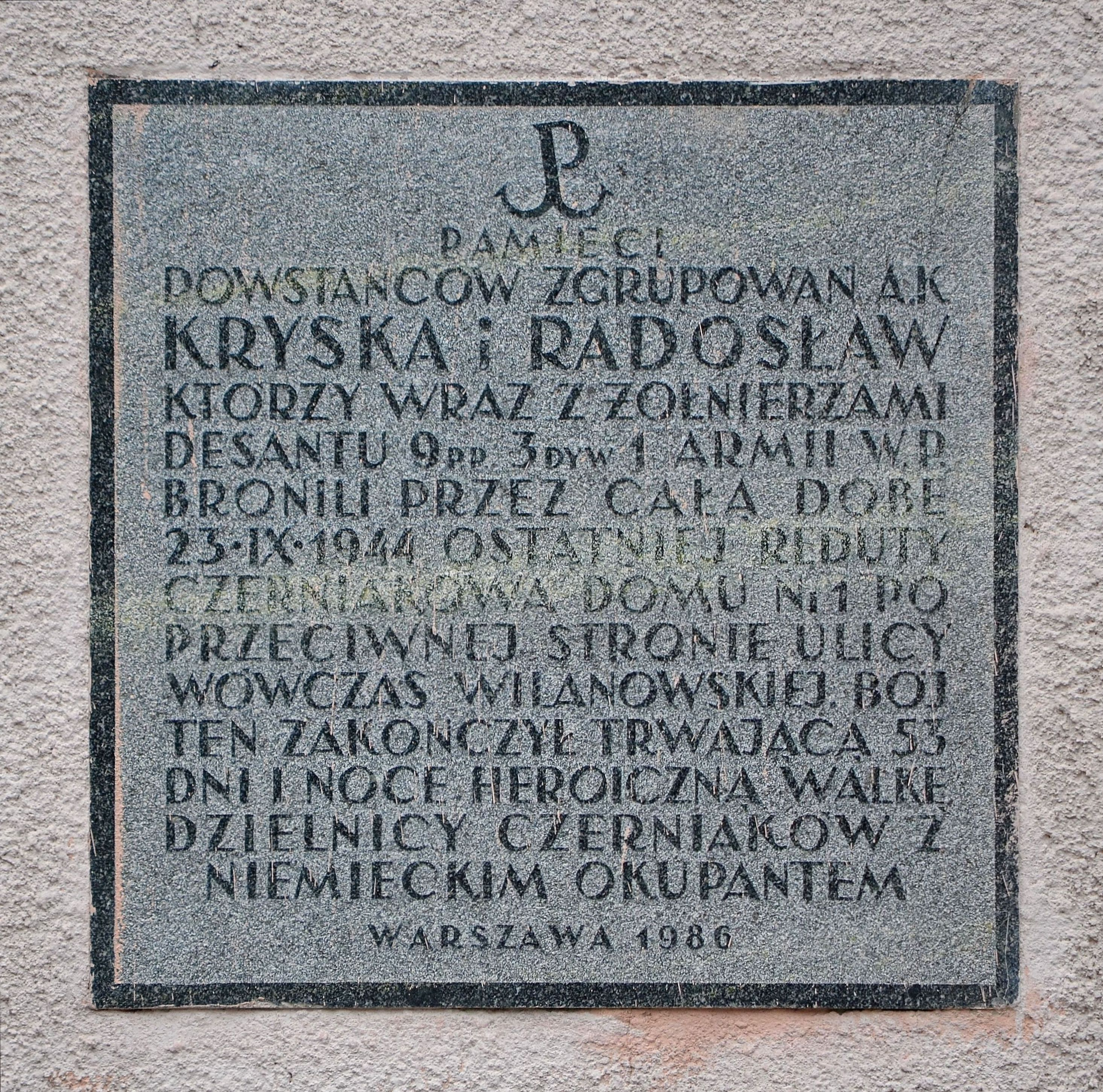
Wilanowska 1 (Solec 53) memorial at the AK's and 1AWP's last-stand stronghold of 23 September 1944 (also incorrectly using the name "Czerniaków district") in 2014

Weeks later, in September, Stefan, now recovered from his shock and injuries, joins up with Kama (who becomes his lover) and their surviving friends in another part of Śródmieście. They fight together with a detachment of the Berling regulars on the Wilanowska Street in the ruined Solec neighbourhood (called "Czerniaków" in the film, after the area's common misnomer names of Powiśle Czerniakowskie and Górny Czerniaków). Ala, who had planned for her and Stefan to escape from Warsaw, decides to stay to care for the wounded at a nearby hospital. Stefan and his remaining friends end up with a die-hard remnant of the Radosław grouping of Kedyw units that refused to surrender.

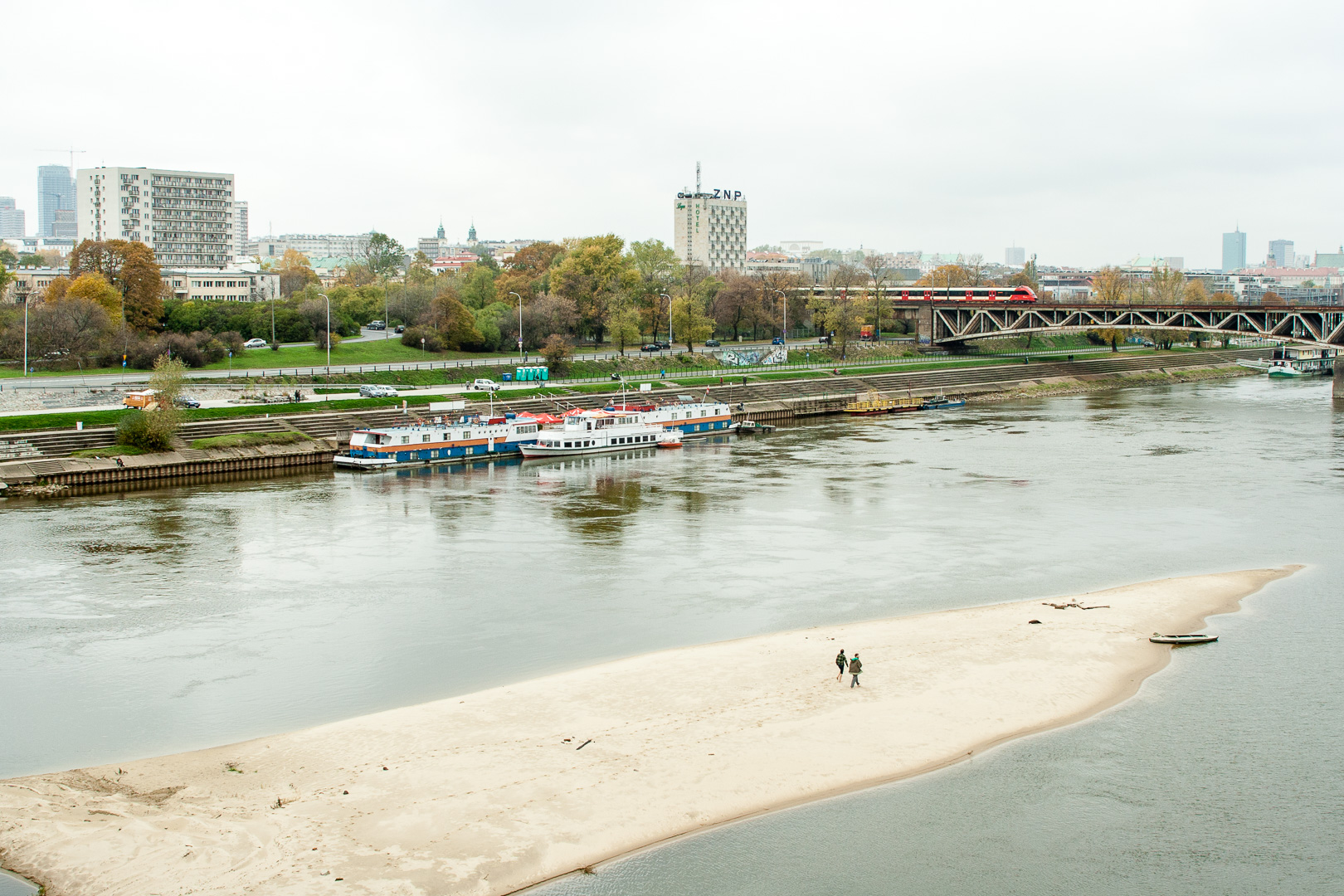
Poniatówka river isle in 2014, the film's final scene location

After his group is defeated, with Kama herself killed by a tank shell, Stefan goes looking for Ala at the hospital overrun by the SS-Dirlewanger. Upon discovering a pile of naked bodies, he is spared by Krauss, a familiar German ex-POW pressed into the Dirlewanger. While Warsaw is being systematically razed by destruction troops, Stefan wanders in a daze through burning streets strewn with corpses. He eventually swims out to a sandbar in the middle of the Vistula, near the blown-up Poniatowski Bridge, and sees Ala there. The two seem to silently watch the panorama of the city in flames, before Stefan is shown as actually sitting there alone (in the film's reality, Ala had been raped and murdered by a Dirlewanger soldier in a mostly-off-screen attack, as confirmed by the writer-director). The apocalyptic night-time scene turns into that of a skyline of the modern Warsaw at dawn.

== Cast ==
- Józef Pawłowski – Stefan Zawadzki
- Zofia Wichłacz – "Biedronka" (Alicja Saska)
- Anna Próchniak – "Kama" (Kamila Jedrusik)
- Antoni Królikowski – "Beksa"
- Maurycy Popiel – "Góral"
- Filip Gurłacz – "Rogal"
- Tomasz Schuchardt – "Kobra"
- Sebastian Fabijański – "Sagan"
- Michał Mikołajczak – "Aleksander"
- Jaśmina Polak – "Ewa"
- Michał Żurawski – "Czarny"
- Michał Meyer – "Pająk"
- Grzegorz Daukszewicz – "Miki"
- Piotr Biedroń – "Joe"
- Marcin Korcz – "Karol"
- Bartosz Porczyk - "Kędzior"
- Max Riemelt - Johann Krauss
- Monika Kwiatkowska – Hanna Zawadzka

== Production ==
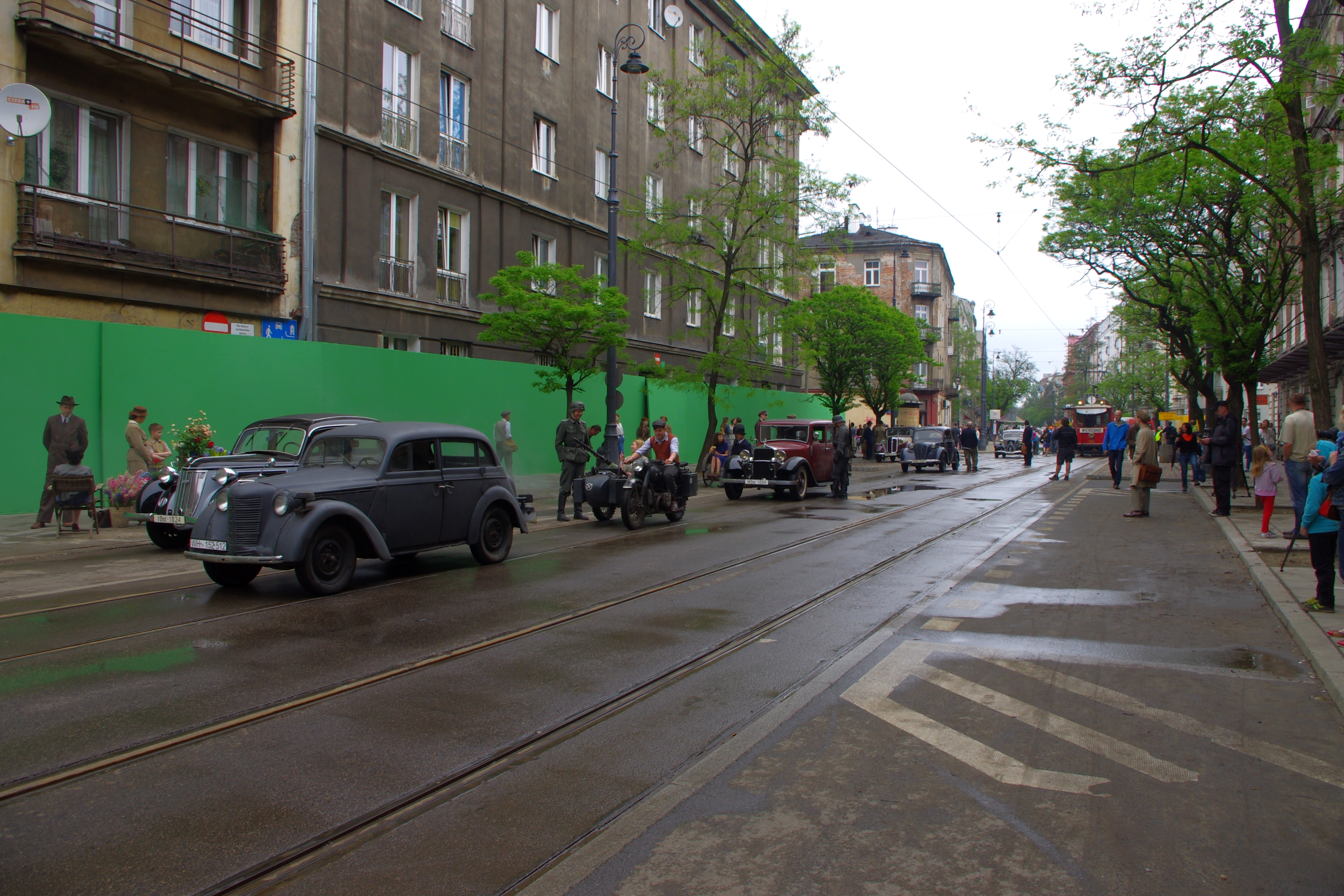
Stalowa Street in Warsaw during the first day of shooting of Warsaw 44, 11 May 2013

Production of the film took almost eight years. Jan Komasa, who wrote and directed the film, stated: "We want to show the Warsaw Uprising to the world" and to "give the Warsaw Uprising its deserved place in world-wide consciousness." Parts of the film were shot on locations around Warsaw, while many of the battle scenes were shot in an abandoned factory in Łódź. The rest of the battle scenes were shot in Walim and Świebodzice in Lower Silesia. As the city of Warsaw was almost destroyed during the uprising, many of the scenes required computer-generated imagery to recreate the Warsaw of old.

=== Music ===
The film's score was composed by Antoni Łazarkiewicz. The soundtrack album was released on 19 September 2014 under the music label Warner Music Poland. The album also includes the song "Miasto", performed by Anna Iwanek, Pati Sokół and Piotr Cugowski. The recording was promoted with a music video in which fragments of the film were used. The album charted at 41 on Poland's OLiS.

== Release and reception ==
Warsaw 44 received a pre-release on 30 July 2014 at Warsaw's National Stadium for an audience of 15,000. It was officially released in Polish cinemas on 2 August 2014, to coincide with the 70th anniversary of the Warsaw Uprising. Its first TV broadcast in Germany was on 2 August 2015 by ZDF.

Among other distinctions, the film won the awards for Best Actress, Best Sound and Best Special Effects at the Gdynia Film Festival and two of the prestigious Golden Rooster Awards given by the China Film Association (Best International Film, Best International Director).

== See also ==
- City of Life and Death
- Come and See
- The Sewer
