= Yrsa Daley-Ward =

English writer, model and actor (born 1989)

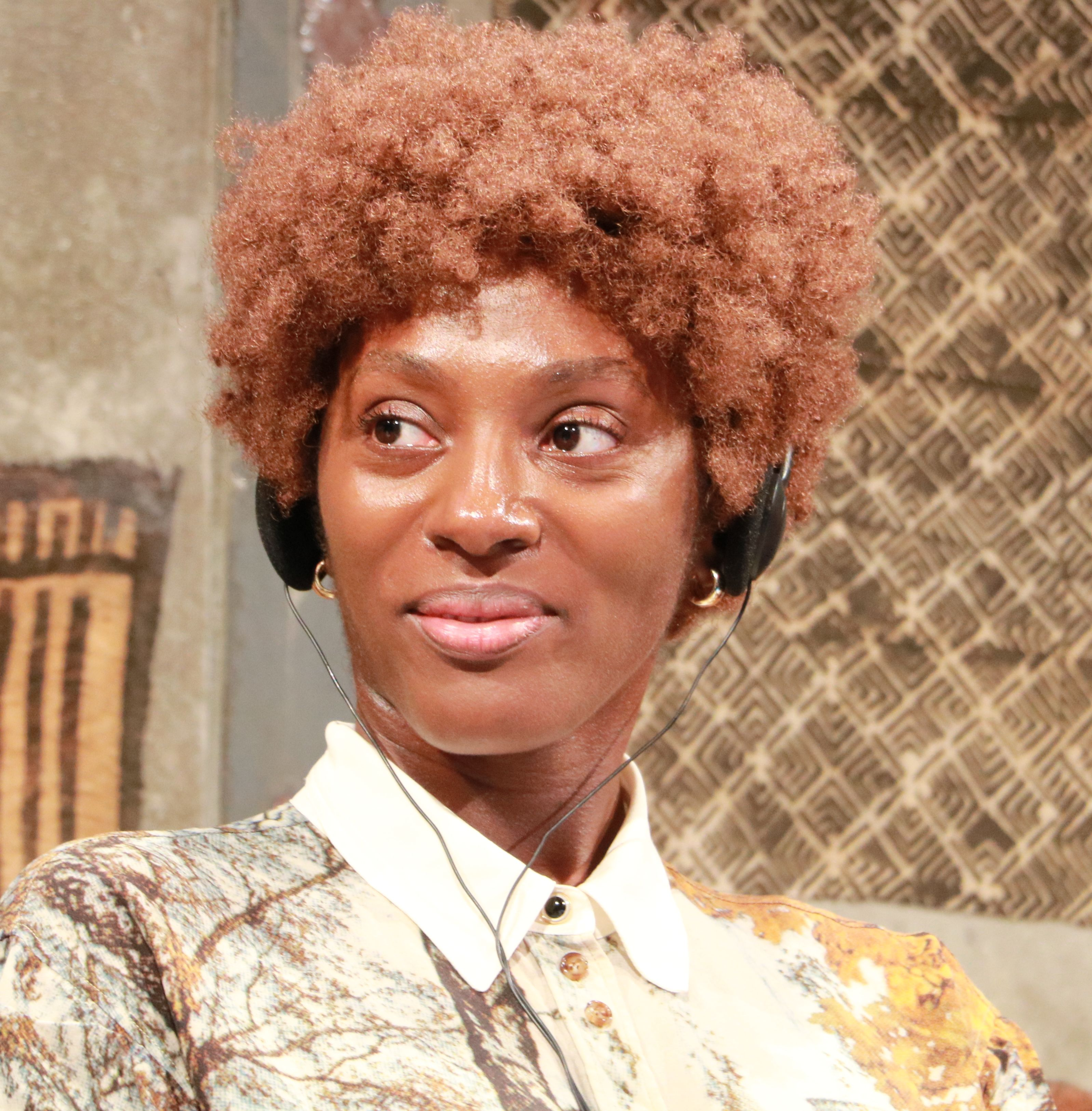
- Daley-Ward in 2024
- Born: 1989 (age 36–37); Chorley, Lancashire, England
- Occupations: Writer, model and actor
- Notable work: Bone (2014); The Terrible (2018)
- Awards: 2019 PEN/Ackerley Prize
- Website: www.yrsadaleyward.com

Yrsa Daley-Ward (born 1989) is an English writer, model and actor. She is known for her debut book, Bone, as well as for her spoken-word poetry, and for being an "Instagram poet". Her memoir, The Terrible, was published in 2018, and in 2019 it won the PEN/Ackerley Prize. She co-wrote Black Is King, Beyoncé's musical film and visual album, which also serves as a visual companion to the 2019 album The Lion King: The Gift.

== Life and career ==
Yrsa Daley-Ward was born to a Jamaican mother and Nigerian father in Chorley, Lancashire, in Northern England, where she grew up with her grandparents, who were devout Seventh-day Adventists.

In her late teens and early 20s, Daley-Ward was a model, "working for brands such as Apple, Topshop, Estée Lauder and Nike". In search of better opportunities, she found the money to buy a ticket to South Africa, where she eventually lived for three years, and has said: "The thing that attracted me to South Africa was that the models look like me and there's so much more diversity".

In her mid-20s, she began to perform and get recognized for her poetry in Cape Town, South Africa, while also working as a model. Not long after returning to London in 2012, she was invited back to South Africa to work alongside the British Council, headlining two poetry festivals in Johannesburg.

Daley-Ward was then listed as one of the top five female writers to watch for by Company Magazine.

Daley-Ward is known for her poems and writings on topics such as identity, race, mental health, and femininity. She is vocal on topics of depression, particularly in her poem "Mental Health", published in her collection Bone. First self-published in 2014, and subsequently issued by Penguin Books in 2017 with additional poems and an introductory essay by Kiese Laymon, Bone has been described by Hanif Abdurraqib in The Atlantic magazine as an "impressive debut" that "honestly excavates a writer’s life, not simply presenting pain, but also showing an individual working through it."

Before publishing Bone in 2014, Daley-Ward released a book of short stories entitled On Snakes and Other Stories in 2013.

Daley-Ward has used social media platforms such as Instagram and Twitter in order to promote her work and connect with her fans. She also made an appearance in a TEDx Talk conference with her talk Your Stories and You.

Daley-Ward has been quoted as saying: "If you're afraid to write it, that's a good sign. I suppose you know you're writing the truth when you're terrified". In an interview with ELLE, she talks openly about her past and struggles along her own journey in developing thicker skin in the face of criticism.

In June 2018, her new book The Terrible was published, a coming-of-age memoir that The Evening Standard called "a rare combination of literary brilliance, originality of voice and a narrative that commands you to keep going until you’ve reached the last page", while the reviewer for The Sunday Times described Daley-Ward as "a stylish writer, as well as an unusual voice". The same month, Daley-Ward discussed her life on BBC Radio Four's Woman's Hour and read her poem "Poetry". In 2019, The Terrible won the PEN/Ackerley Prize.

Daley-Ward co-wrote Black Is King, Beyoncé's musical film and visual album, which serves as a visual companion to the 2019 album The Lion King: The Gift. Daley-Ward's work has appeared in many publications worldwide, including Vogue, Elle, Harper's Bazaar, Dazed, Playboy and Notion. She is also a contributor to the 2019 anthology New Daughters of Africa, edited by Margaret Busby.

Daley-Ward's 2021 book, The How – Notes on the Great Work of Meeting Yourself, is "a compilation of essays, poems, heartfelt musings and earnest advice that provides a 'nudge toward' finding your voice".

In July 2024, Daley-Ward was awarded an Honorary Doctorate by Lancaster University.

Daley-Ward's 2025 book, The Catch is "a deeper look into motherhood, sisterhood, and what it's like to take one path over the other."

== Filmography ==
Year	Title	Role	Notes
2021 – 2024	Outer Range	Dr. Nia Bintu	Series 1 and 2
2019 – 2023	World on Fire	Connie Knight	Series 1 and 2

== Publications ==
=== Books ===
- On Snakes and Other Stories (3:am Press, 2013, ISBN 978-0957357181)
- Bone (CreateSpace Independent Publishing, 2014; Penguin (Particular Books), 2017, Foreword by Kiese Laymon, ISBN 978-1846149665)
- The Terrible (Penguin, 2018, ISBN 978-1846149825)
- The How – Notes on the Great Work of Meeting Yourself (Penguin, 2021, ISBN 9780143135609)
- The Catch: A Novel (W.W.Norton (Liveright), 2025, ISBN 978-1-324-09251-3)

== Acting work ==
- The Collaboration (TBA)
- World on Fire (2019)
- Boxx (2016)
- White Colour Black (2016)
- A Moving Image (2016)
- Der Koch (2014)
- Death Race: Inferno (2013) [video]
- David is Dying (2011)

Also appeared in:

- Kidnap and Ransom (2012)
- Shameless (2009)
- Drop Dead Gorgeous (2007)

== See also ==
- Kate Nash
- Karley Sciortino
- Nathan Stewart-Jarrett
