= All My Friends Are Dead (2020 film) =

2020 film by Jan Belcl

- Release poster
- Polish: Wszyscy moi przyjaciele nie zyja
- Directed by: Jan Belcl
- Written by: Jan Belcl
- Produced by: Leszek Bodzak; Aneta Cebula-Hickinbotham; Mitja Okorn; Grzegorz Olkowski
- Starring: Michał Meyer; Adam Woronowicz; Julia Wieniawa; Adam Turczyk; Nikodem Rozbicki; Monika Krzywkowska
- Cinematography: Cezary Stolecki
- Edited by: Jan Belcl
- Music by: Łukasz Targosz
- Production company: Aurum Film
- Distributed by: Netflix
- Release date: 28 December 2020
- Running time: 96 minutes
- Country: Poland
- Language: Polish

All My Friends Are Dead (Polish: Wszyscy moi przyjaciele nie zyja) is a 2020 Polish black comedy horror film written and directed by Jan Belcl. It was released on Netflix worldwide on 3 February 2021.

== Premise ==
A group of friends face a whirlwind of shocking events at a New Year's Eve party.

== Cast ==
- Michał Meyer as Grzegorz Dąbrowski
- Adam Woronowicz as Inspector Kwaśniewski
- Julia Wieniawa as Anastazja
- Nikodem Rozbicki as Paweł
- Adam Turczyk as Jordan
- Monika Krzywkowska as Gloria
- Szymon Roszak as Robert
- Michał Sikorski as Rafał
- Adam Bobik as Pizza Boy
- Tomasz Karolak as Pizza Boy's boss (voice)
- Mateusz Więcławek as Filip
- Yassine Fadel as Jacques
- Bartłomiej Firlet as Jezus
- Wojciech Łozowski as Dariusz
- Aleksandra Pisula as Oliwia
- Paulina Gałązka as Jolanta
- Magdalena Perlińska as Renata
- Konrad Żygadło as Daniel
- Katarzyna Chojnacka as Angelika
- Kamil Piotrowski as Marek

== Reception ==
The film received an average score of 20% on Rotten Tomatoes. John Serba of Decider stated that, "All My Friends Are Dead is garish and pointless, an unfunny drag, two slogs, a trudge and an eternity-and-a-half leading to a stoopid and loud climactic eruption of blood, flames, bodily fluids and American hair metal."
