= Zofia Wichłacz =

Polish actress (born 1995)

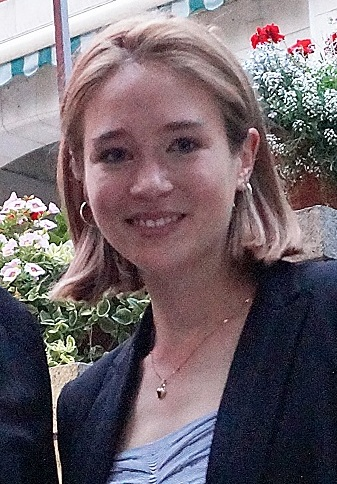
- Wichłacz in 2018
- Born: 5 April 1995 (age 30); Warsaw, Poland
- Occupation: Actress
- Years active: 2013–present

Zofia Wichłacz (Polish pronunciation: [ˈzɔfja ˈvixwat͡ʂ]; born 5 April 1995) is a Polish actress. She has appeared in films such as Warsaw 44 and Afterimage, and television programmes such as Medics, The Romanoffs and World on Fire.

== Early life ==
Wichłacz was born in Warsaw, Poland, on 5 April 1995. Her father, Zbigniew Wichłacz, is a camera operator and her mother, Anna Seitz-Wichłacz, is a scenographer. She attended the theatre centre U Machulskich and graduated from the LXIV Liceum Ogólnokształcące im. Stanisława Ignacego Witkiewicza in Warsaw.

== Career ==
Wichłacz first appeared in a film about the Warsaw Uprising in 2012. She appeared in the made-for-television film The Morality of Mrs. Dulska in 2013, in one episode of Głęboka woda the same year and in Medics in 2014. She became better known after starring in Warsaw 44, winning two prestigious Polish awards: the Golden Lion for the best female role during the 39th Gdynia Film Festival and the Eagle for the revelation of the year in the 17th Polish Film Awards. Andrzej Wajda had seen Zofia in a play and had decided to cast her in Afterimage, which later turned out to be the director's last production.

In 2019 Wichłacz starred in the drama series DNA, a multi-company production about illegal adoptions, directed by Henrik Ruben Genz and Kasper Gaardsøe. That same year, she portrayed Kasia, a Polish waitress, in the British drama series World on Fire.

In 2021 she had a leading role in the horror film Nobody Sleeps in the Woods Tonight Part 2.

== Filmography ==
Year	Title	Role	Notes
2013	Moralność pani Dulskiej	Mela Dulska	
2013	Głęboka woda	Kasia Rowińska	1 episode
2014	Warsaw 44	Alicja "Biedronka" Saska	Polish Academy Award for Discovery of the Year
2016	Afterimage	Hania	
2017	Spoor	Matogi's mother	
2017	Amok	Zofia Bala	
2018	The Romanoffs	Nadya	1 episode
2018	1983	Karolina Lis	Netflix original
2019	World on Fire	Kasia Tomaszeski	
2019	DNA	Julita Sienko	
2021	The Mire	Teresa Zarzycka	
2021	Receptura	Zosia Żakowska	
2021	Nobody Sleeps in the Woods Tonight Part 2	Wanessa Kowalczyk	
2022	Wotum nieufności	Milena Hauer	
2023	Warszawianka	Zofia Sztajner	6 episodes

== Awards and nominations ==
Year	Award	Category	Nominated work	Result
2014	Gdynia Film Festival	Best Actress	Warsaw 44	Won
2015	Polish Film Award	Best Actress	Warsaw 44	Nominated
2015	Polish Film Award	Discovery of the Year	Warsaw 44	Won
2017	Berlin International Film Festival	European Shooting Star	Amok	Won
