= Nobody Sleeps in the Woods Tonight 2 =

2021 Polish horror film

- Release poster
- Polish: W lesie dziś nie zaśnie nikt 2
- Directed by: Bartosz M. Kowalski
- Written by: Bartosz M. Kowalski; Mirella Zaradkiewicz
- Produced by: Jan Kwieciński
- Starring: Zofia Wichlacz; Julia Wieniawa; Wojciech Mecwaldowski
- Production companies: Akson Studio; Plan Zet; Polski Instytut Sztuki Filmowej
- Distributed by: Netflix
- Release date: 27 October 2021
- Running time: 96 minutes
- Country: Poland
- Language: Polish

Nobody Sleeps in the Woods Tonight 2 (Polish: W lesie dziś nie zaśnie nikt 2) is a 2021 Polish supernatural slasher film and a sequel to Nobody Sleeps in the Woods Tonight (2020). Once again, it's directed by Bartosz M. Kowalski and written by Bartosz M. Kowalski and Mirella Zaradkiewicz. Julia Wieniawa, Wojciech Mecwaldowski, Izabela Dabrowska and Michal Zbroja reprise their roles, while Mateusz Więcławek and Zofia Wichlacz are the new leads.

== Plot ==
Adam Adamiec, a young, lonely police officer, shows up at the station where he works with his boss, Sergeant Waldek Gwizdalun, who informs him of his latest case: the arrest of a pair of deformed twin brothers who, according to the testimony of the teenager Zosia, were responsible for the death of several of her friends at a nearby camp, from which only she managed to escape alive. Since there is not much clarity about the crimes, Waldek agrees to escort Zosia to the murderers' cabin to investigate what happened and leaves Adam in charge until his return.

Upon arriving at the cabin, Waldek momentarily separates from Zosia to use the latrine and while she waits for him, part of the meteorite that mutated the twins opens and releases a substance that mutates Zosia into a mutant like the twins. She kills Waldek when she returns to the cabin. Later Adam and his partner Wanessa try to communicate with the sergeant, but when they do not receive a response, at Adam's suggestion they end up traveling to the cabin only to discover the place destroyed and Waldek's corpse. Since they do not know what to do, Wanessa contacts two hunters named Mariusz and Slawek to help them defend themselves from the sergeant's killer. However, the four are forced to take refuge in the abandoned camp because Slawek accidentally pins his hands in a bear trap.

At one of the cabins the quartet encounter a frightened prostitute named Janeczka who reveals that someone murdered her companion Oliwier outside the cabin before everyone else arrived. Tensions between the survivors escalate when they learn that Slawek has bled to death and they debate how to escape until Adam motivates them to work together to survive. The group devises a plan to ambush Zosia by using Janeczka as bait. However Zosia anticipates the plan, killing Mariausz and Janeczka, forcing Adam and Wanessa to take refuge in the cabin. As the two argue over what to do, Zosia bursts into the cabin to attack them. Adam attempts to shoot her but is unable to, and is abandoned by Wanessa who pushes him towards Zosia and escapes to the police station in an ambulance that had been attacked by Zosia before the police arrived.

Zosia uses a stinger in her throat to infect Adam with the same substance from the meteorite and thus transform him into a mutant like her. Adam, now able to communicate with her in a language that only they understand, asks her what she did to him, to which she answers that they are monsters infected by an evil from the moon, and tries to convince him to join her in killing people because she no longer considers herself human and believes that the world has not been good to her. Although at first Adam has his doubts when confirming with Zosia that he now has the same strength, he follows her advice to kill whoever he wants, and together they go to the house of an abusive man whom Adam despises for mistreating his pet dog. After eliminating the man, Zosia accepts him as her partner and the two make love. Adam asks her why she chose him and she answers that when she saw him she felt that they were alike. Adam thanks her for showing him his place in the world and together they go to the police station to free the twins since Zosia hopes to cause the apocalypse with his help.

At the station Zosia and Adam open the twins' cell, but both refuse to escape despite their insistence. Wanessa appears using a machine gun and throws a grenade at them that fails to activate. Zosia asks Adam to eliminate Wanessa. As Adam hesitates, a frustrated Zosia rips off Wanessa's face and smashes her head several times, concluding that Adam is a coward. She leaves the station before being run over by several armored trucks of the special forces that take Adam into custody while one of the twins accidentally activates the grenade, killing them both and destroying the police station. Adam is then taken to a laboratory where he is subjected to different tests as a guinea pig.

== Cast ==
- Mateusz Więcławek as Adam Adamiec
- Zofia Wichlacz as Wanessa Kowalczyk
- Julia Wieniawa as Zosia Wolska
- Wojciech Mecwaldowski as Oliwier
- Sebastian Stankiewicz as Mariusz
- Andrzej Grabowski as Sergeant Waldek Gwizdała
- Lech Dyblik as Janusz
- Izabela Dabrowska as Janeczka
- Robert Wabich as Slawek
- Michal Zbroja as Twin #1 / Twin #2
