= Kamil Szeptycki =

Polish actor (born 1991)

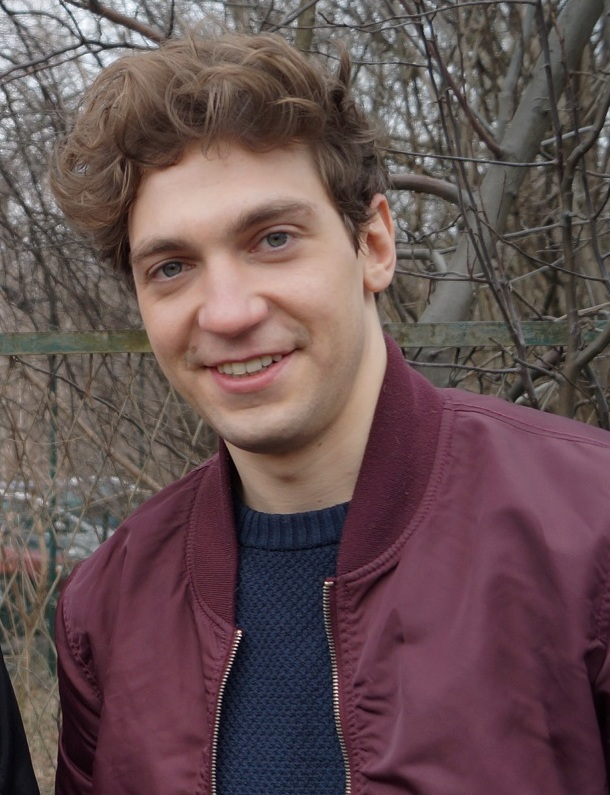
- Szeptycki in 2019
- Born: 27 January 1991 (age 34); Immenstadt, Germany
- Education: AST National Academy of Theatre Arts
- Occupation: Actor
- Years active: 2009–present

Kamil Szeptycki (born 27 January 1991) is a Polish actor. He is best known for his roles in the films Stones for the Rampart (2014) and Piłsudski (2019).

== Early life ==
Szeptycki was born in Immenstadt to Polish parents who immigrated to Germany during the Communist era. His mother, Małgorzata Szeptycka, is an actress. At the age of two, he and his family moved back to Poland, settling in Wrocław. He attended Agnieszka Osiecka High School and graduated from the Wrocław branch of the AST National Academy of Theatre Arts in 2016.

== Career ==
In 2014, Szeptycki made his film debut playing Maciej Aleksy Dawidowski in Stones for the Rampart, based on the 1943 novel of the same name by Aleksander Kamiński. In 2019, he played Kazimierz Sosnkowski in Michał Rosa's Piłsudski. He will play Julian Fontana in the upcoming film Chopin, a Sonata in Paris by Michał Kwieciński.

== Personal life ==
Szeptycki is a vegetarian. He is in a relationship with actress Ina Sobala.

== Filmography ==
=== Film ===
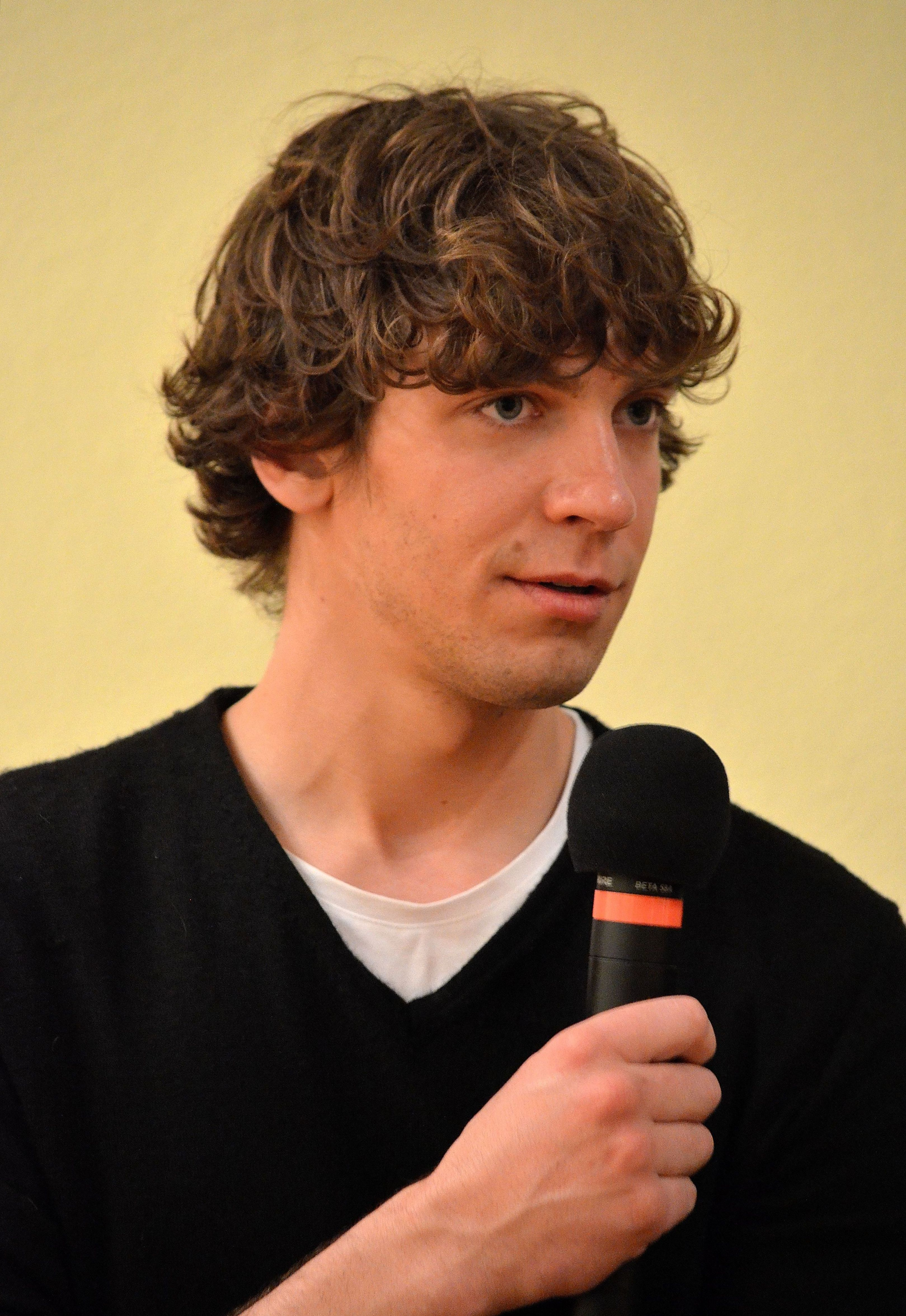
Szeptycki doing press for Stones for the Rampart in 2014

Year	Title	Role	Ref.
2014	Stones for the Rampart	Maciej Aleksy Dawidowski	
2017	Letters to Santa 3	Przemo	
2019	Piłsudski	Kazimierz Sosnkowski	
2020	The Champion	Kropp	
2021	Czarna owca	Tomasz Gruz	
2022	Heart Parade	Dawid	
2022	Kiss, Kiss!	Krystian "Kris" Kosecki	
2023	Squared Love All Over Again	Marcin	
2023	Squared Love Everlasting	Marcin	
2023	Porady na zdrady 2	Igor	
2023	Raport Pileckiego	Jan Hrebenda	
2024	Clergyman		
2025	Chopin, a Sonata in Paris	Julian Fontana	

=== Television ===
Year	Title	Role	Notes	Ref.
2007	First Love	Bogdan	19 episodes	
2013–2023	Komisarz Alex	Bartek Werner; "Szczurek"; Michał Wójcik	3 episodes	
2014	Medics	Kacper Kowalski	Episode: "Intrygi i nieporozumienia"	
2014–2020	Father Matthew	Kuba Guzowski; Arek Taplak	2 episodes	
2015	Aż po sufit!	Tomek Domirski	13 episodes	
2016	Bodo	Eugeniusz Cękalski	1 episode	
2017	Wartime Girls	Jurek Bednar	5 episodes	
2017	W rytmie serca	Daniel	Episode: "Fałszywy trop"	
2017	Lekarze na start	Dr. Piotr Szuma	52 episodes	
2018	Drogi wolności	Klaus	Episode: "Oberwanie chmury"	
2018–2019	Ślad	Tomasz Bączyk		
2022–2023	To nie ze mną	Roberto Trapieri	27 episodes	
2023	A Girl and an Astronaut	Captain Maciej Niedźwiecki		
2024	Matylda	Boden		
2024	Kiedy ślub?	Patryk Wróbel	8 episodes	

=== Music videos ===
Year	Title	Artist	Role	Ref.
2018	"Start a Fire"	Margaret	Himself	
