= Explosion of the tank-trap in Warsaw =

Explosion during the Warsaw Uprising

- Part of Warsaw Uprising
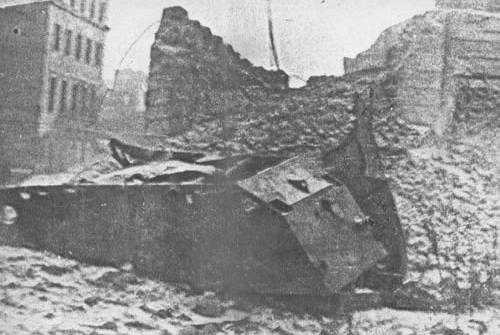
- Remnants of the bomb-carrier vehicle thrown by the explosion on Kiliński Street
- Date: August 13, 1944
- Location: Warsaw, Poland; 52°15′11.1″N 21°0′32.67″E
- Type: Explosion of a special vehicle
- Deaths: At least 300
- Injuries: Hundreds

The so-called explosion of the tank-trap on Kiliński Street in Warsaw occurred on 13 August 1944, during the Warsaw Uprising, at Kiliński Street in the Old Town. The blast was caused by a captured German special vehicle, a Borgward IV, which the insurgents had captured. More than 300 Polish insurgents and civilians, who had gathered to admire the trophy, were killed in the explosion. In reality, the vehicle was not a "tank-trap" (czołg pułapka) but a tracked demolition vehicle carrying half-ton of high explosives intended to destroy barricades on Podwale Street. The explosion was essentially an accident. However, some witnesses suggested that the Germans may have deliberately allowed the insurgents to bring the dangerous vehicle deeper into the Old Town.

This event became known in Polish history as the "tank-trap explosion" and is considered one of the most tragic episodes of the defense of the Old Town. Since 1992, the anniversary of the explosion has been commemorated as the Day of Remembrance for the Old Town.

== Capture of the "tank" ==
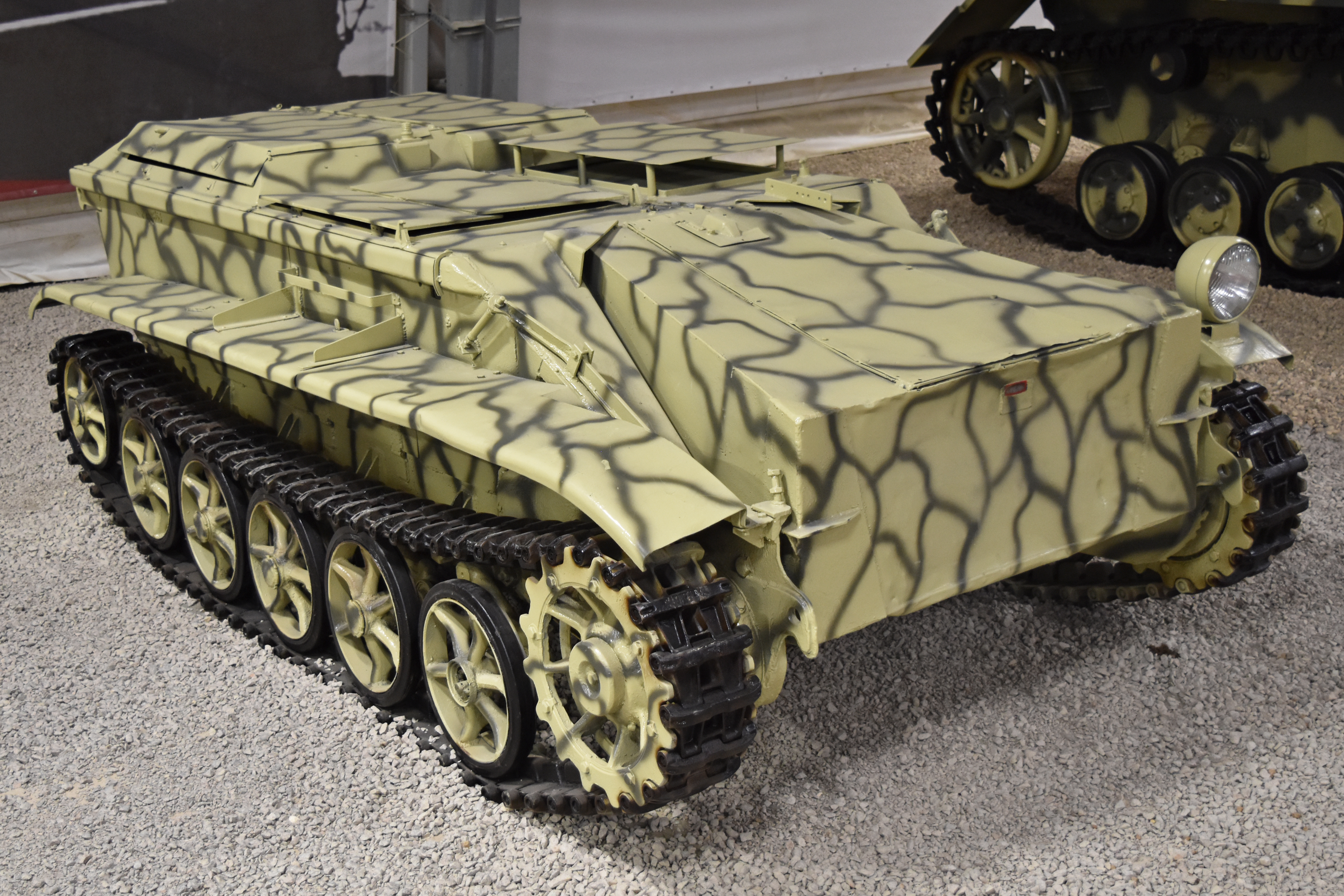
Borgward IV

According to the account of Witold Piasecki, codename Wiktor, a veteran of the Home Army's (AK) Gustaw Battalion (published in Gazeta Wyborcza), on 13 August 1944, around 8:00 or 9:00 AM, two German tanks (Panzer IV) fired upon Polish positions on Świętojańska and Podwale streets from the Castle Square. Shortly after, a small vehicle emerged from behind the tanks and moved towards a barricade on Podwale Street, defended by soldiers from the Gustaw Battalion. Molotov cocktails were thrown at the vehicle, hitting it accurately. The vehicle caught fire and got stuck on the barricade. The driver fled, and the surprised insurgents quickly extinguished the flames with sand.

Other sources describe the events slightly differently. The German attack reportedly began around 10:00 AM, preceded by an hour of artillery fire from three German armored guns. Later, a German vehicle (referred to as a "tankette") advanced toward the barricade, escorted by a larger armored vehicle and infantry.

The first Polish soldier to examine the captured vehicle was cadet Wiktor Trzeciakowski, codename Tur (or, according to other sources, cadet Ludwik Wyporek, codename Miętus). To their surprise, it did not resemble any known German combat vehicle. It also had no armament, only a radio. Battalion commander Captain Ludwik Gawrych, codename Gustaw, and his deputy Włodzimierz Stetkiewicz, codename Włodek, instructed the soldiers to stay cautious and keep a distance from the vehicle. They suspected it might be a trap, especially since the Germans had ceased fire immediately after losing the vehicle.

At around 5:00 PM, another group of insurgents seized the vehicle, citing orders from the defense command of the Old Town. They were likely soldiers from one of the motorized insurgent units, such as the Młot Squadron or the Orlęta Company. The vehicle was started, and the insurgents drove it through the streets of the Old Town, causing great excitement among the civilian population. As they shouted "Tank captured!", crowds gathered to admire the trophy.

== Explosion ==
The vehicle was not a tank but a heavy cargo transporter, Borgward IV, used by the special 302nd Panzer Battalion and employed as a self-propelled mine layer for destroying fortifications. The captured transporter carried 500 kg of explosive material in a container mounted on its armor.

After being captured by insurgents, the vehicle was driven triumphantly around the Old Town of Warsaw. The insurgents moved through the Old Town Market Place but were eventually forced out by Major Stanisław Błaszczak, codename Róg, the commander of the Old Town defense. They then returned to Podwale Street and turned onto Kiliński Street. According to some reports, the insurgents planned to park the vehicle in the courtyard of the Raczyński Palace.

Around 6:00 pm, while attempting to cross a small barricade on Kiliński Street, the metal box containing the explosives slipped off the front of the vehicle's armor. This led to a massive explosion among the crowds. The destruction was compounded by the detonation of Molotov cocktails stored in a building at 3 Kiliński Street.

Over 300 people were killed, and hundreds more were wounded. Among the dead was actor Józef Orwid. The heaviest losses were suffered by the Orlęta Company which lost 80 men, and all the companies of the Gustaw Battalion with 26 killed. The Wigry Battalion lost 14 men, and 59 were wounded. Witnesses described the gruesome scene of dismembered bodies hanging from gutters, cornices, and shattered windows, with body parts found on nearby streets. General Tadeusz Komorowski, codename Bór, the commander of the Home Army, was also injured in the explosion while observing the event from the Raczyński Palace.

The tragedy had a profound impact on both the insurgents and the civilian population. Captain Gustaw demanded an investigation into the carelessness that led to the massacre, but with the increasing intensity of German attacks on the Old Town, the matter was soon sidelined.

Over the years, several myths and misunderstandings about the explosion developed. Some Polish historians and memoirists (such as Adam Borkiewicz, Władysław Bartoszewski, Antoni Przygoński, and Stanisław Podlewski) initially believed that the explosion was a German trap, with the Nazis deliberately leaving a tank filled with explosives, which was detonated remotely or with a time delay. Other inaccuracies emerged, including the claim that soldiers from the Gustaw Battalion had started the vehicle, or that the vehicle was a Goliath tracked mine.

Recent research suggests that the vehicle that caused the explosion on Kiliński Street was not a trap detonated by the Germans but rather a heavy cargo transporter which intended purpose was to destroy the barricade on Podwale Street, and the explosion was likely not triggered intentionally. However, Piasecki argued that the Germans might have intentionally allowed the vehicle to be moved into the Old Town, knowing it contained explosives, thus causing numerous casualties when it exploded in the crowded area after German fire ceased.

== Commemoration ==
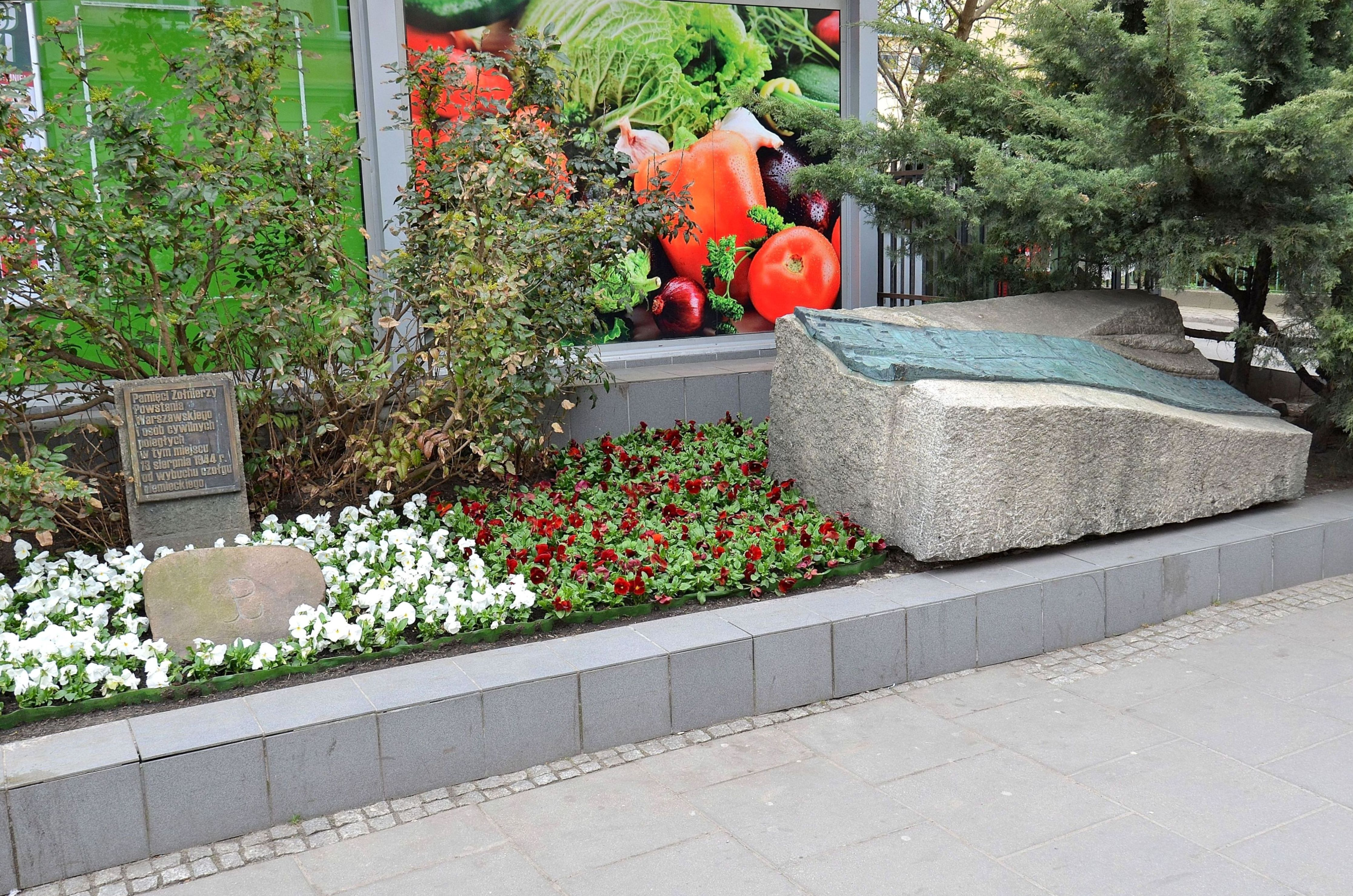
Place of remembrance at Kiliński Street

In the 1950s, a commemorative stone was placed on the sidewalk at 3 Kiliński Street, inscribed with a plaque with the following text:

A place hallowed by the blood of 500 insurgents and civilians from the Old Town, who perished on 13 August 1944 from the explosion of a tank with explosives secretly planted by the enemy.

In the early 1970s, a second, smaller stone with a bronze plaque was added nearby, reading:

In memory of the soldiers of the Warsaw Uprising and civilians who perished in this place on 13 August 1944 from the explosion of a German tank.

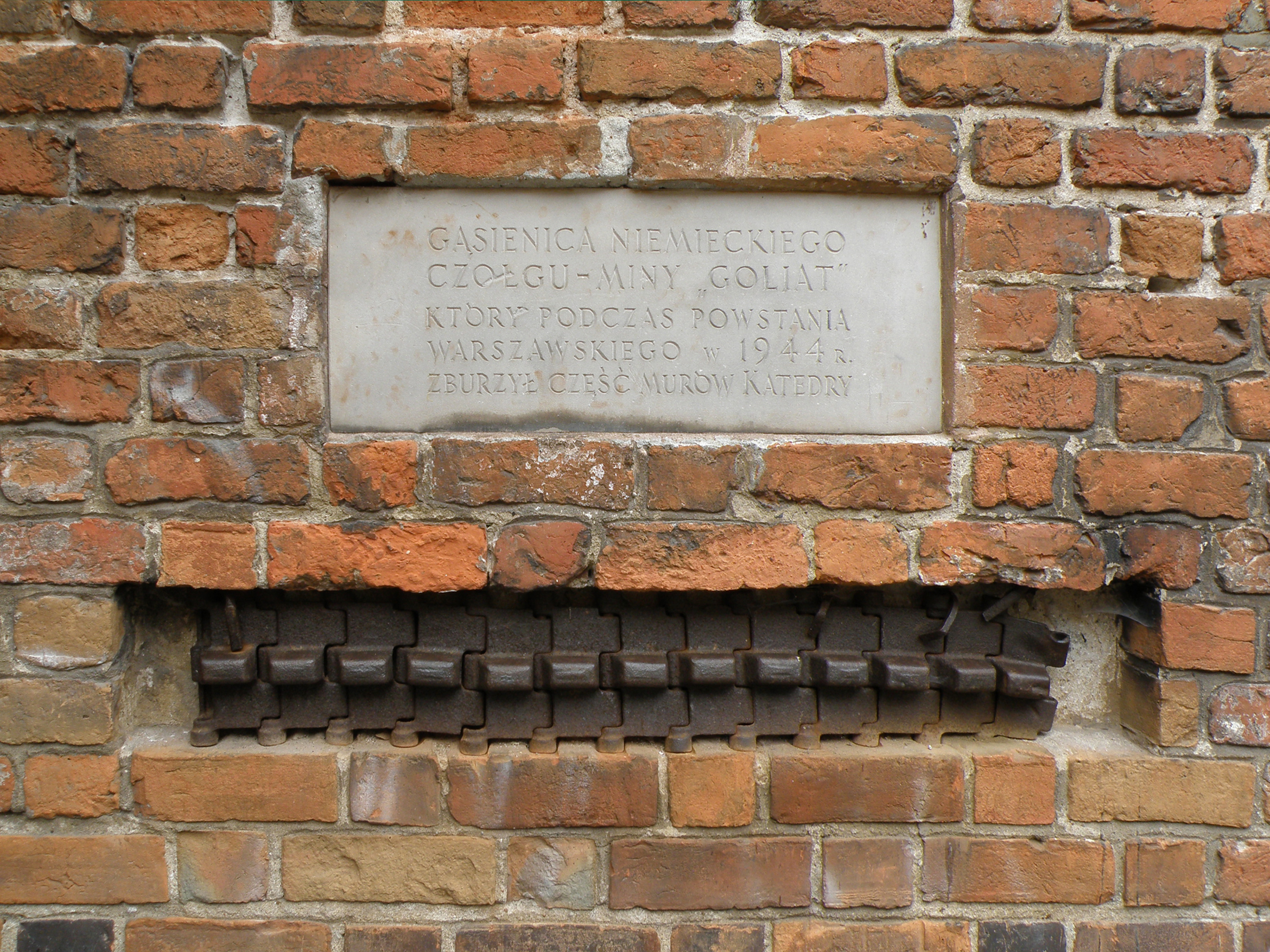
The fragment of a continuous track on the wall of St. John's Archcathedral

One of the few remaining traces of the events is a fragment of a continuous track, possibly from the same vehicle that caused the massacre on Kiliński Street. This fragment is displayed on the wall of St. John's Archcathedral, facing Dziekania Street, with the following (incorrect) inscription:

The continuous track of the German mine tank 'Goliath', which during the Warsaw Uprising in 1944 destroyed part of the Cathedral walls.

Since 1992, the anniversary of the explosion on Kiliński Street has been commemorated as the Day of Memory for the Old Town. It is an integral part of the anniversary celebrations of the Warsaw Uprising.

== Cultural depictions ==
- Immediately after the tragedy, Tadeusz Gajcy dedicated a poem, "Święty kucharz od Hipciego", which included references to the event.
- It is mentioned by Roman Bratny in the second volume of his novel Kolumbowie. Rocznik 20. In the book, the narrator describes people who gathered to admire the captured vehicle, sitting on its turret, though the real Borgward IV did not actually have a turret.
- The explosion is a pivotal moment in Jarosław Marek Rymkiewicz's novel Kinderszenen.
- On 13 August 2010, a short documentary film 13 sierpnia '44, written and directed by Małgorzata Brama, premiered at Castle Square in Warsaw, focusing on the tragedy.
- It was described by American journalist Rita Cosby in her book Quiet Hero: Secrets From My Father's Past, which tells the story of her father, Ryszard Kossobudzki, a soldier of the Home Army who survived the explosion in 1944.
- It is vividly depicted in the 2014 film Miasto 44. In 2026, Telewizja Polska shared the explosion scene itself (without the gory immediate aftermath) on YouTube.
