= Julia Wieniawa =

Polish actress (born 1998)

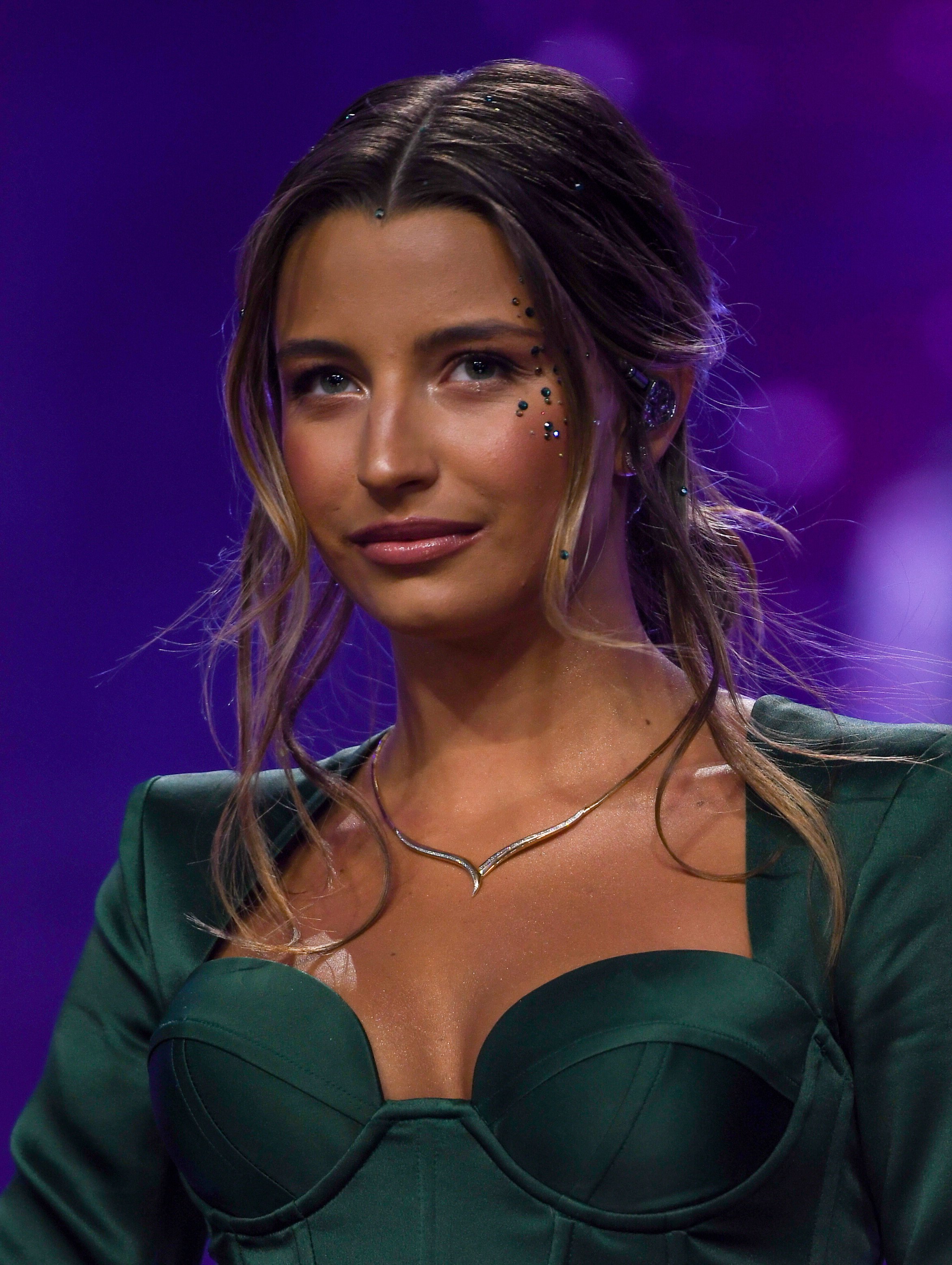
- Julia Wieniawa in 2023
- Born: 23 December 1998 (age 27); Warsaw, Poland
- Occupations: Actress, Singer, Songwriter, Composer
- Years active: 2012−present

Julia Marta Wieniawa-Narkiewicz (born 23 December 1998) is a Polish actress and singer. She is best known for her performance as Zosia Wolska in Nobody Sleeps in the Woods Tonight (2020). She debuted in stage performances at the Workshop Musical Academy at the "Roma" Musical Theatre. The role of Paulina in the series Rodzinka.pl brought her popularity (2013–2020). In the years that followed, she played major roles in the films Nobody Sleeps in the Woods (2020) and its sequel (2021), All My Friends Are Dead (2021) and Small World (2021), as well as in the TV series It's Worth It (2019–2020). As a vocalist, she released the studio album Omamy (2022).

Konrad and Marta Wieniawa-Narkiewicz. Her father is a graphic designer, and her mother is her manager. She has three younger half-sisters on her mother's side, and one half-sister on her father's side.

Wieniawa graduated from Jan Zamoyski High School in Warsaw. She took part in acting classes at the "u Machulskich" Theatre and prepared for higher theatre and film schools in the Pilaszewska and Nowakowska Acting Atelier.

== Acting career ==
Wieniawa began her career in stage performances for the Musical Academy Workshop at the "Roma" Musical Theatre. In the years 2012–2014, she performed in musicals with Maciej Pawłowski's Author's School of Music (also in Roma) and in the Rock Opera project "Szambalia" directed by Maciej Pawłowski at the Rose Theatre in Kingston upon Thames, London United Kingdom.

In 2013, she joined the regular cast of the series Family.pl, in which she played the role of Paulina, Kuba Boski's girlfriend. In the following years, she appeared in series such as Klan (2014), Pielęgniarki (2014), Na dobre i na złe (2016), Na Wspólnej (2017), Druga Szansa (2017), W rytmie serca (2018) and Za marzenia (2019). She also played supporting roles in the films Kobiety mafii by Patryk Vega (2018) and Kobieta sukesu by Robert Wichrowski (2018).

In 2019, she appeared in Marek Bukowski's Dołęga-Mostowicz. Kiedy zamykam oczy. The play was positively received, and critics appreciated Wieniawa's performance. In 2019–2020, she played one of the main roles in the TV series Zasze warto. In 2020, she played the main roles in the films Nobody Sleeps in the Woods Tonight and All My Friends Are Dead. She also appeared in Jan Komasa's film The Hater that same year. In 2021, she reprised her role of Zosia Wolska in the film Nobody Sleeps in the Woods Tonight Part 2. In 2023, the series Teściowie was made available on the Polsat Box Go platform, in which she plays the role of Andżelika Nagórska.

Wieniawa appeared in the music video for Jeremi Sikorski's song Bez niej nie byłoby nas in 2014 and Ten Typ Mes' and Justyna Święs' Immunity in 2018.

== Music career ==
In November 2015, My Music released her debut single "Co mi jest". In 2016, she sang in the song "Na zawsze" from the album of the production duo Flirtini titled Heartbreaks & Promises vol. 3.

In 2017, she signed a phonographic contract with the Kayax label, under which she released the single "Oddycham" in July. On 9 November 2018, she released the single "Nie muszę", which was awarded two platinum record awards. The following year, she sang as a guest in Dawid Kwiatkowski's song "Plan B" from his album titled "13 grzechów niczyich". In 2020, she released the singles: "SMRC", "Wspólna chwila" with Mery Spolsky and Arek Kłusowski and "Niezadowolona" with L.U.C.-iem. In 2021, she recorded a duet with Maciej Musiałowski "Zabierz tę miłość", and announced the release of her debut album with the single "Na darmo". She also sang in the songs "Bezpieczny lot" by the duo Karaś / Rogucki and "Sebiksy" by the Kacperczyk brothers, and in cooperation with Kuba Karaś she recorded her version of the song "Nie mam dla ciebie miłości".

On 15 February 2022, she performed at the Bestsellery Empik gala, during which she sang a duet with Anita Lipnicka in the song "Zanim zrozumiesz" from the Varius Manx repertoire and the premiere song "Rozkosz", the second single from her debut album. On 3 June, during the Orange Warsaw Festival, she played her first concert. On 17 June, she released her debut album Omamy, with which she reached fourth place on the OLiS sales list. She also promoted the album with the singles: "Nie mów", "Milczysz", "Omamy", "Wenus" and "Mi cię nie żal". On 25 June and 8 July, she took part in the Małe Granie concert tour. In October, she was nominated for the MTV European Music Award for the best Polish performer, and in December she embarked on the Omamy Tour club tour. Also in 2022, she sang in the singles "Ikona" by Tymek and "What's Your Feeling" by Ment, and in the song "Ona tańczy sama (Terry)" by Ofelia from her album titled. 8.

== Other ventures ==
=== Professional ===
Wieniawa hosted the programme I Love Violetta (2014) and co-hosted the music festivals Polsat SuperHit Festival (2019) and Top of the Top Sopot Festival (2023). Together with Stefano Terrazzino, she took second place in the final of the 11th edition of the entertainment program Polsatu Dancing with the Stars. (2020). In August 2023, she was announced as one of the jurors of the 15th edition of the talent show Mam talent, which the station TVN will broadcast in 2024.

Wieniawa participated in advertising campaigns for Orange telecommunication services, Reebok footwear manufacturer, Deichmann shoe store chain and the Apart brand. In 2020, she initiated the cosmetic brand Jusee Cosmetics and the clothing brand Lemiss. In November 2021, she announced that she had sold her shares in Jusee Cosmetics and ended her cooperation with the brand.

=== Social ===
Wieniawa took part in social campaigns: the anti-smog campaign Pierwsza Doba bez Smogu (pl. First 24 Hours Without Smog) (2018), Weź się zbadaj "Kwiat Kobiecości" Foundation promoting prophylactic cytological tests (2018), #CosDoNichMam of the "Rak'n'Roll" Foundation promoting breast ultrasound testing (2018); #PoDrugiejStronieLustra dedicated to the prevention of nervous disorders (2019), Zabierz głos bo go stracisz (pl. Speak up or you will lose it) of Stefan Batory Foundation encouraging to participate in the parliamentary elections in 2019, Solidarnie dla transplantacji (2019, 2020), pro-turnout #MilionPowodów and Suma Waszych Głosów (2020) before the presidential elections in Poland and the campaign for the Polish Foundation for Helping Children with Disabilities (2021).

Wieniawa took part in a photo session for the charity calendar Presence 2020 of Stowarzyszenie Mali bracia Ubogich and television spots promoting the Polsat Foundation. In 2021, she appeared in a spot of the SEXED.PL Foundation, against violence against women and gender-based violence.

Wieniawa is an ally of the LGBT community. She took part in the Warsaw Equality Parade in 2019, for which she was nominated in the "Gala" plebiscite in the "online" category.

== Achievements ==
Wieniawa is one of the most popular Polish celebrities on Instagram - in July 2021 her profile was followed by over 2 million users.

Wieniawa is the winner of the Star of the Pleiades in the category "debut of the year" (2018). She received an award in the Personalities and Successes of the Year 2018 plebiscite. She was twice awarded by the "Joy" magazine in the "Influencer of the Year" plebiscite in the "Lifestyle Influencer" (2018) and "Gold Influencer" (2019) categories. In 2020, she was awarded the title of "Woman of the Year" by the "Glamour" monthly in the "Style" category. In 2021, she received a special award from the Apart brand in the #Hashtags of the Year plebiscite.

Wieniawa was placed in the ranking of the most influential women in the Polish Internet by InluTool (2019, 2022) and the most influential influencers in Poland according to the "Forbes" monthly (2020). In 2020–2023, she was included in the ranking of the best female personal brands of the "Forbes Women" magazine, taking the highest, 4th position in 2020. In 2022, she was included in the ranking of "100 most influential Polish women and men" according to the readers of the "Newsweek Polska" weekly.

== Personal life ==
Wieniawa was associated with actor Antoni Królikowski (2017–2018) and musician Aleksander Milwiw-Baron (2019). In 2020, she became involved with actor Nikodem Rozbicki. In the autumn of 2022, they announced their separation, but after a few months, they got back together.

== Filmography ==
=== Feature films ===
| Year | Title | Roles |
|---|---|---|
| 2018 | Women of Mafia | Sandra Chyb "Futro" |
| 2018 | Kobieta sukcesu | Lilka |
| 2018 | Serce nie sługa | Girl in the club |
| 2019 | How to Marry a Millionaire | Lena |
| 2020 | Nobody Sleeps in the Woods Tonight | Zosia Wolska |
| 2020 | The Hater | "FitAneta" |
| 2020 | All My Friends Are Dead | Anastazja |
| 2021 | Small World | Ola aged 16 |
| 2021 | Nobody Sleeps in the Woods Tonight Part 2 | Zosia Wolska |
| 2022 | How I Fell in Love with a Gangster | Nikita |
| 2022 | The Sins | Sandra |
| 2023 | The Peasants | Marysia Pastuszka |
| 2024 | Unpredictable | Adelina Marczewska |
| 2025 | Off We Go | Justyna Gugulak |
| 2026 | Off We Go 2 | Justyna Gugulak |

=== Television ===
| Year | Title | Roles | Comments |
|---|---|---|---|
| 2013–2020, 2025 | Family.pl | Paula | Regular role |
| 2014 | Pielęgniarki | Julia Siwiak | |
| 2014 | The Clan | Pati | 2 episodes |
| 2015 | Detektyw Łodyga na tropie wynalazków | Julka | |
| 2016 | Na dobre i na złe | Agnieszka | Episode: "Niespodzianka" |
| 2017 | Na Wspólnej | Dorota Pilecka | 9 episodes |
| 2017 | Druga szansa | Ksawery's fan | Episode: "Basia" |
| 2017 | Lekarze na start | Julia | 1 episode |
| 2018 | W rytmie serca | Aleksandra "Alex" Kamińska | 9 episodes |
| 2018 | Women of Mafia | Sandra Chyb "Futro" | Miniseries |
| 2019 | Za marzenia | Vlogger | 2 episodes |
| 2019 | The Pleasure Principle | Natalia | 2 episodes |
| 2019–2020 | Zawsze warto | Ada Michalska | Main role |
| 2021 | Small World | Ola aged 16 | Miniseries |
| 2023 | Teściowie | Andżelika Nagórska | |
| 2023 | The Office PL | Herself | Episode: "Trzydziestka" |

=== Voice roles ===
| Year | Title | Roles | Comments |
|---|---|---|---|
| 2017 | Descendants 2 | Uma | Polish dub |
| 2017 | Spirit Riding Free | Pru Granger | Polish dub |
| 2018 | Cinderella and the Secret Prince | Cinderella | Polish dub |
| 2019 | The Big Wish | Salma | Polish dub |
| 2019 | Descendants 3 | Uma | Polish dub |
| 2020 | Osiedle RZNiW | | Audio series |
| 2020 | Lalka | Izabela Łęcka | Audio series |
| 2021 | Random | Mary "Jantar91" | Audio series |
| 2024 | The Inseparables | Dee | Polish dub |

== Theater ==
=== Garnizon Sztuki ===
- 2023: Gra as Katja

=== Teatr Komedia w Warszawie ===
- 2020: Dom lalki. Część 2 as Emmy

=== Teatr Telewizji ===
- 2019: Dołęga-Mostowicz. Kiedy zamykam oczy as Ada

== Discography ==
=== Studio albums ===
| Year | Album details | Highest position on the list | | | |
|---|---|---|---|---|---|
| Year | Album details | POL | 2022 | Omamy: Released: 17 czerwca 2022; Plant: Kayax; Format: CD, digital download, streaming | 4 |

=== Singles ===
| Year | Title | Top positions in the charts | | | Certyfikat | Sale | Album |
| Year | Title | POL (airplay) | POL (airplay news) | POL (streaming) | Certyfikat | Sale | Album |
|---|---|---|---|---|---|---|---|
| 2015 | „Co mi jest” | – | – | X | lack | no data | – |
| 2017 | „Oddycham” | – | – | X | lack | no data | – |
| 2018 | „Nie muszę” | 59 | 4 | X | POL: 2× platinum record | POL: 40 000+ | – |
| 2020 | „SMRC” | – | – | X | lack | no data | Omamy |
| 2020 | „Wspólna chwila” (and Mery Spolsky and Arek Kłusowski) | – | – | X | lack | no data | – |
| 2020 | „Niezadowolona” (and L.U.C.) | – | – | X | lack | no data | Wszyscy moi przyjaciele nie żyją (soundtrack) |
| 2021 | „Zabierz tę miłość” (oraz Maciej Musiałowski) | – | – | X | POL: platinum record | POL: 50 000+ | Random (soundtrack) |
| 2021 | „Na darmo” | – | – | X | lack | no data | Omamy |
| 2021 | „Nie mam dla ciebie miłości (Kayax XX Rework)” (oraz Kuba Karaś) | – | – | X | lack | no data | Kayax XX Rework / Omamy |
| 2022 | „Rozkosz” | – | – | X | lack | no data | Omamy |
| 2022 | „Nie mów” | – | – | X | lack | no data | Omamy |
| 2022 | „Milczysz” | – | – | X | lack | no data | Omamy |
| 2022 | „Omamy” | – | – | X | lack | no data | Omamy |
| 2022 | „Nie muszę (Kayax XX Rework)” (and Kayah) | – | – | X | lack | no data | Kayax XX Rework |
| 2022 | „Wenus” | – | – | X | lack | no data | Omamy |
| 2022 | „Mi nie żal” | – | – | X | lack | no data | Omamy |
| 2023 | „Nie całuj” (oraz Dawid Tyszkowski i Kuba Karaś) | – | X | 56 | lack | no data | – |
„–” means that the single was not listed in the given chart. „X” means that the list did not exist at the time.

=== With guest participation ===
| Year | Title | Album |
|---|---|---|
| 2016 | „Na zawsze” (Flirtini, guest: Julia Wieniawa i Zeppy Zep) | Heartbreaks & Promises vol. 3 |
| 2021 | „Bezpieczny lot” (Karaś/Rogucki, guest: Julia Wieniawa) | Czułe kontyngenty |
| 2021 | „Sebiksy” (Kacperczyk, guest: Julia Wieniawa) | Kryzys wieku wczesnego |
| 2022 | „Ikona” (Tymek, guest: Julia Wieniawa) | – |
| 2022 | „What’s Your Feeling” (Ment, guest: Julia Wieniawa) | – |

=== Other ===
| Year | Title | Album |
|---|---|---|
| 2019 | „Plan B” (Dawid Kwiatkowski, guest: Julia Wieniawa) | 13 grzechów niczyich |
| 2020 | „Tak piękna jest tylko” | – |
| 2020 | „Świtezianka” | – |
| 2022 | „Ona tańczy sama (Terry)” (Ofelia, guest: Julia Wieniawa) | 8 |

== Music videos ==
| Year | Title | Direction |
|---|---|---|
| 2017 | „Oddycham” | Anna Bystrowska, Alan Willmann |
| 2018 | „Nie muszę” | Paweł Fabjański |
| 2020 | „SMRC” | Przemek Dzienis |
| 2020 | „Wspólna chwila” | Piotr Onopa |
| 2020 | „Niezadowolona” | Filip Berendt |
| 2021 | „Zabierz tę miłość” | Jakub Barzak |
| 2021 | „Na darmo” | Miłosz Sakowski |
| 2021 | „Nie mam dla ciebie miłości” | Igor Ignacy Leśniewski |
| 2022 | „Rozkosz” | Marta Klara |
| 2022 | „Nie mów” | Kinga Brocka |
| 2022 | „Milczysz” | Maciej Aleksander Bierut |
| 2022 | „Omamy” | Maciej Nowak |
| 2022 | „Wenus” | Nikodem Rozbicki |
| 2022 | „Mi nie żal” | Natasha Ivanova |
| 2023 | „Nie całuj” | Tadeusz Łysiak |
Guest
| 2016 | „Na zawsze” | Anna Bystrowska, Alan Willmann |
| 2021 | „Bezpieczny lot” | Filip Berendt |
| 2021 | „Sebiksy” | Igor „Ajgor Ignacy” Leśniewski |
