= Michał Sikorski =

Polish actor (born 1995)

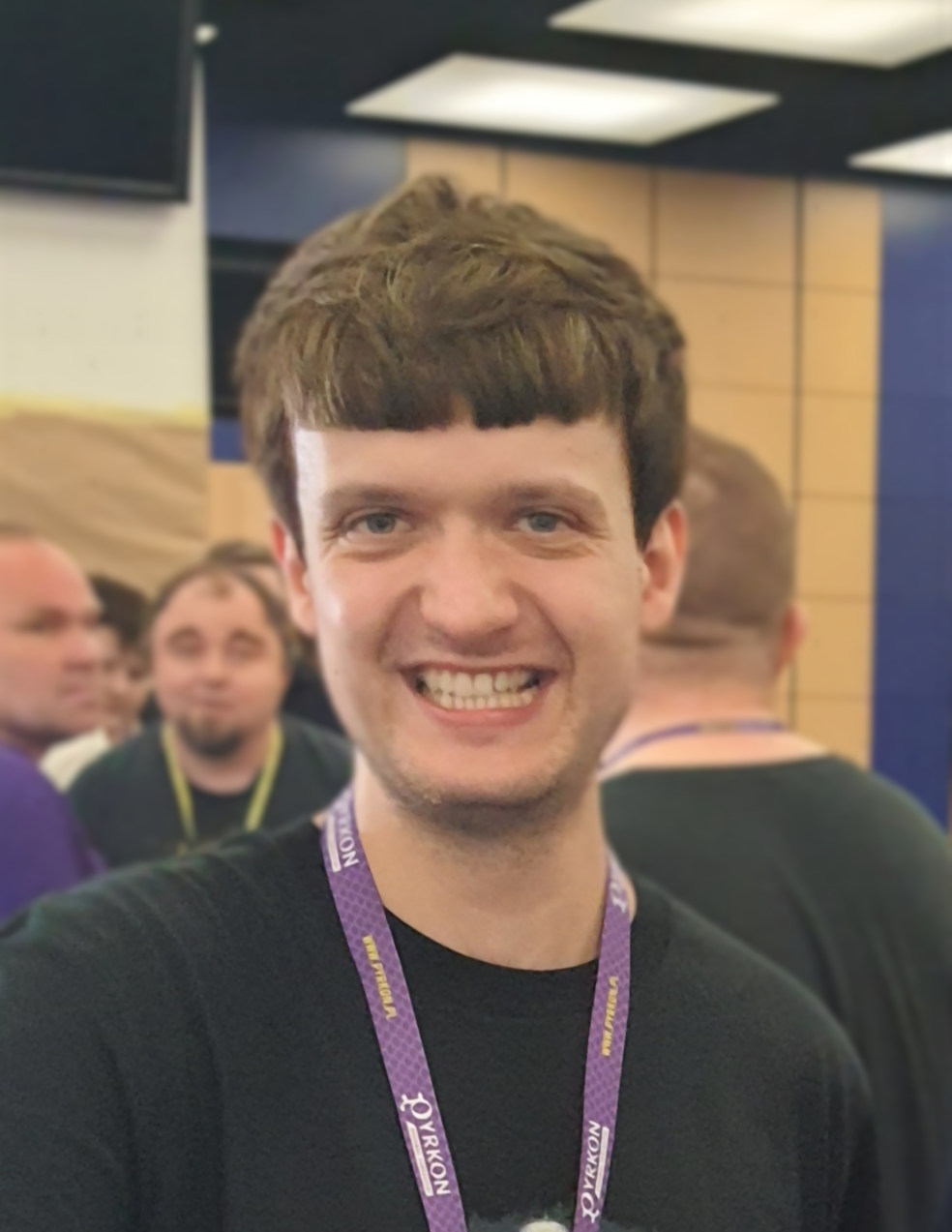
- Sikorski at Pyrkon in 2024
- Born: 5 September 1995 (age 31); Wadowice, Poland
- Education: AST National Academy of Theatre Arts
- Occupation: Actor
- Years active: 2017–present
- Children: 1

Michał Sikorski (Polish pronunciation: [ˈmi.xaw ɕiˈkɔr.ski]; born 5 September 1995) is a Polish actor.

== Biography ==
Sikorski was born in Wadowice. He attended Wadowita High School and graduated from the AST National Academy of Theatre Arts in Kraków. He worked at the Polish Theatre in Poznań before being invited to the Teatr Dramatyczny in Warsaw. In June 2025, he hosted a concert at the National Festival of Polish Song in Opole.

He has one child, a son.

== Filmography ==
=== Film ===
Year	Title	Role	Ref.
2017	Czuwaj	Scout	
2017	The Last Suit	Young Piotrek	
2020	All My Friends Are Dead	Rafał	
2021	Czarna owca	Pablo	
2021	Sonata	Grzegorz Płonka	
2023	Masz ci los!	Przemek	
2023	Freestyle	Mąka	
2023	Scarborn	Jasiek	
2023	Chcesz pokoju, szykuj się do wojny	Tytus	
2024	Piep*zyć Mickiewicza	Mathematician	
2025	Wujek Foliarz	Szybki	
2025	Życie dla początkujących	Czarek	

=== Television ===
Year	Title	Role	Notes	Ref.
2019	War Girls	Józek	1 episode	
2019	Ultraviolet	Mieszko	2 episodes	
2021	Open Your Eyes	Paweł	5 episodes	
2022	Dead End	Wojtek Słomka	6 episodes	
2023–present	1670	Jakub	Main role	
2025	The Eastern Gate	Jasiek	1 episode	

== Awards and nominations ==
Award	Year	Category	Nominated work	Result	Ref.
Polish Film Festival	2021	Best Professional Acting Debut	Sonata	Won	
