= Życie dla początkujących =

- Directed by: Paweł Podolski
- Written by: Paweł Podolski, Lynn Kucharczyk
- Cinematography: Ernest Wilczyński
- Edited by: Bartłomiej Piasek, Piotr Wójcik (Piasek & Wójcik)
- Music by: Hubert Walkowski
- Release date: 2025
- Running time: 76 minutes
- Country: Poland
- Language: Polish

Życie dla początkujących is a 2025 film directed by Paweł Podolski, written by Podolski and Lynn Kucharczyk.

The film was screened in the competition at the Polish Film Festival in 2025.

== Cast ==
- Magdalena Maścianica as Monika
- Michał Sikorski as Czarek
- Bartłomiej Kotschedoff as Mirosław
- Małgorzata Rożniatowska as Krystyna
- Wojciech Machnicki as Władzio
- Jolanta Wołłejko-Plucińska as Bożena
- Katarzyna Skolimowska as Jadzia
- Antoni Syrek-Dąbrowski as Kierownik
- Agnieszka Kudelska as Wanda

Source.

== Awards ==
The film received Grand Prize in the Polish Feature Film Competition at the Off Camera Festival in 2025. It earned 2026 Eagle (Polish Film Award) nomination in the category: Best Makeup (Agnieszka Jońca).
