= Piłsudski (film) =

2019 Polish biographical drama film

- Directed by: Michał Rosa
- Written by: Michał Rosa
- Starring: Borys Szyc; Magdalena Boczarska; Jan Marczewski
- Cinematography: Piotr Śliskowski
- Edited by: Rafał Listopad
- Music by: Stefan Wesołowski
- Production company: Kadr
- Distributed by: Next Film
- Release dates: September 5, 2019 (Worldwide); September 13, 2019 (Poland)
- Running time: 208 minutes
- Country: Poland
- Languages: Polish; Russian
- Budget: 14 900 000 zł
- Box office: 1,034,548 $

Piłsudski is a 2019 Polish biographical drama film directed and written by Michał Rosa.

== Plot ==
In 1901, the Polish Socialist Party helped Józef Piłsudski escape from an asylum in Saint Petersburg. After his escape, Piłsudski created Combat Organization of the Polish Socialist Party.

On 13 November 1904, the first armed attack of the Combat Organization took place in Grzybowski Square during a demonstration. The Combat Organization murdered Russian generals and officers. PPS members accused 'Ziuk' for his methods.

In September 1908, PPS performs successful train robbery in Bezdany.

In 1914, World War I began, and Piłsudski took it as an advantage. With permission of Austro-Hungarian authorities, he created Legions, which fought against Russian Empire.

In 1918, Piłsudski arrived in Warsaw and delivered speech about Poland's revival.

== Cast ==
- Borys Szyc as Józef Piłsudski
- Magdalena Boczarska as Maria Piłsudska
- Jan Marczewski as Walery Sławek
- Józef Pawłowski as Aleksander Sulkiewicz
- Maria Dębska as Aleksandra Piłsudska
- Eliza Rycembel as Wanda Juszkiewiczówna
- Tomasz Schuchardt as Aleksander Prystor
- Tomasz Borkowski as Józef Kwiatek
- Filip Kosior as Tadeusz Kasprzycki
- Kamil Szeptycki as Kazimierz Sosnkowski
- Krzysztof Chodorowski as Władysław Mazurkiewicz
- Hubert Kułacz as Tomasz Arciszewski

== Filming ==
The filming took place in Kraków, Lublin, Zakopane, Zgierz, Łódź, Kasina Wielka, Tarnawa and Lubiąż. Lubiąż Abbey was used for filming Saint Petersburg psychiatric hospital scenes. The filming lasted from August 9 to October 3 and from December 8 to December 14, 2018.

== Reception ==
Marcin Grudziąż gave the film 3 out of 5 stars. In his review, he praised Szyc's acting and scenography but criticized small scale battle scenes, Dębska's acting, and giving up many events.

== Accolades ==
Award	Category	Recipient	Result
Polish Film Festival	Best Actress	Magdalena Boczarska	Won
Polish Film Festival	Best Film	Michał Rosa	Nominated
Polish Film Award	Best Actor	Borys Szyc	Nominated
Polish Film Award	Best makeup	Dariusz Krysiak, Miroslawa Wojtczak, Waldemar Pokromski	Nominated
