= Nobody Sleeps in the Woods Tonight =

2020 Polish horror film

- Release poster
- Polish: W lesie dziś nie zaśnie nikt
- Directed by: Bartosz M. Kowalski
- Written by: Bartosz M. Kowalski; Jan Kwieciński; Mirella Zaradkiewicz
- Produced by: Jan Kwieciński
- Starring: Julia Wieniawa; Sebastian Dela; Michał Lupa; Wiktoria Gąsiewska
- Production companies: Akson Studio; Plan Zet; Polski Instytut Sztuki Filmowej
- Distributed by: Netflix
- Release date: October 28, 2020
- Running time: 102 minutes
- Country: Poland
- Language: Polish

Nobody Sleeps in the Woods Tonight (Polish: W lesie dziś nie zaśnie nikt) is a 2020 Polish supernatural slasher film directed by Bartosz M. Kowalski, written by Kowalski, Jan Kwieciński, and Mirella Zaradkiewicz, and starring Julia Wieniawa, Michał Lupa, Sebastian Dela, and Wiktoria Gasiewska.

== Plot ==
The story begins with an old lady washing blood-soaked clothing in a tub of water. A postman arrives and notices noises coming from the house's cellar. Thinking someone is trapped down there, he rips off a board barring the entrance and enters the basement. He is then dragged by an unseen force into the basement and disappears.

Thirty years later, a phone-free camp for teenagers starts with all the teens arriving and surrendering their phones to the camp leaders. The teens are placed into groups. The main protagonists all end up in a group together and head off into the woods with counselor, Iza, for a three-day hike. As they go trekking through the forest they come across a dead, rotting deer. Iza notices that the deer was not killed by a predator, but orders everyone to keep going into the woods.

They stop by a lake to spend the night. That night they hear a noise in the woods; Iza searches but finds a little fox. Daniel is accompanied at the lake by Aniela, and they have sex. Aniela then goes back to her tent, not knowing that soon afterward Daniel is beaten to death by a gigantic man by banging his body against a tree. In the morning, everyone searches for Daniel, Iza disregards the "rules of horror" that Julek warns the group about, and they split up in groups, with half of them searching for Daniel with the coach, and the rest waiting by the lake in case Daniel comes back.

The group reaches the house seen at the beginning of the movie and discovers the basement with Daniel's mangled body inside. As they attempt to run away, they notice the killer coming inside the house, so they hide in the basement. Zosia and Julek escape through a cellar window, but Iza stays behind to fight the monster to try and get Daniel's phone to call for help, which ends in her death.

Aniela and Bartek are talking by the lake when she is suddenly killed by a metal bar going through the back of her neck and mouth. Horrified, Bartek runs away and attempts to get help from a priest in a nearby church. The priest knocks him out, gags him, and ties him to a chair. The priest hears noises outside and goes to investigate. He is killed by the killer putting him in a woodchipper. The killer enters the church and opens the confessional to find Bartek hiding.

Zosia and Julek, having run away from the killer's house, find refuge in an old man's house, who tells them the story of the twins who lived with their mother until they found a small meteorite that crashed in the area. The twins take a piece of rock and keep it hidden under their bed. The following night, a black fluid seeps from the rock and enters the bodies of the twins, who lose their minds and become animalistic carnivores. Their mother awakens in the morning only to be horrified seeing her sons eating their dog in the basement. She locks them up in the basement and hunts animals to keep them hidden. The old man states that the mother lost her mind. One day, while trying to get a dead animal into the basement, she dies, causing the twins to be able to escape.

The teens decide to call for help and go back to the basement to get the phone from Daniel's body. Julek tries to distract the killer with some noise and Zosia sneaks into the basement to grab the phone. However, the killer's twin is in front of her and Julek stabs him to distract his attention. Zosia is knocked unconscious and chained up, while Julek is stabbed with a knife and his tongue ripped out.

Zosia awakens to find Julek suffering with the knife embedded in his abdomen. She tries to use Daniel's phone, but it dies. Zosia kills Julek to end his pain. She uses the knife to unchain herself and considers escaping, but takes a machete from the room instead. She goes upstairs, hearing the twin snoring on the bed. Zosia stabs the twin until he appears to be dead. She leaves the house and runs.

The old man hears knocking on his door and shoots through the door with his shotgun, thinking it might be the twins, but discovers that he just murdered Bartek. Zosia notices a policeman near a forest road, who agrees to drive her back to civilization after noticing her distress. On their way, they run over one of the twins. Seeing a body on the road and wanting to help despite Zosia's warnings, the officer is killed after failing to use his pistol against the murderer.

Zosia is locked in the car in the back but breaks the window. She attempts to drive away in the car, after shifting the stick and clutch, and is successful, though only after driving several times over the killer and drives away.

At the end of the movie, the killer is shown to still be alive. His twin wakes up in his bed, having survived the stabbing, and stares at the police lights outside his house.

== Cast ==
- Julia Wieniawa as Zosia Wolska
- Michał Lupa as Julek Rosiejka
- Sebastian Dela as Daniel Czajka
- Wiktoria Gąsiewska as Aniela Turek
- Stanisław Cywka as Bartek Sokołowski
- Gabriela Muskała as Iza
- Michał Zbroja as Killer #1 / Killer #2
- Mirosław Zbrojewicz as Postman - Tarman
- Piotr Cyrwus as Priest
- Olaf Lubaszenko as Policeman
- Wojciech Mecwaldowski as Camp manager Oliwier
- Bartłomiej Kotschedoff as Keeper from the camp
- Bartłomiej Firlet as Keeper helper
- Małgorzata Szczerbowska as the mother of the twins
- Izabela Dąbrowska as Janeczka, a prostitute

== Reception ==
=== VOD rentals ===
Nobody Sleeps in the Woods Tonight was one of the most rented titles on American Netflix soon after its premiere. A monthly magazine Kino reported that the movie landed in the top 10 list of the most-watched films on the platform.

=== Critical reception ===
On the review aggregator website Rotten Tomatoes, 67% of 6 critics' reviews are positive. Matt Donato of whattowatch.com rated the film 3 stars out of 5, calling it "familiar" yet praising the practical effects and "crisp" cinematography.

== Sequel ==
In March 2021, Netflix confirmed that Kowalski and his team had officially started production of the sequel, titled Nobody Sleeps in the Woods Tonight Part 2. It was released in October 2021.
