= Wartime Girls =

Polish World War II drama

- Polish: Wojenne dziewczyny
- Genre: War
- Written by: Marek Kreutz
- Directed by: Michał Rogalski, Karolina Syska
- Starring: Aleksandra Pisula, Vanessa Aleksander, Marta Mazurek
- Country of origin: Poland
- Original language: Polish
- No. of seasons: 5
- No. of episodes: 65

Production
- Running time: 45 minutes

Original release
- Network: TVP1
- Release: March 5, 2017 – November 20, 2022

Wartime Girls (Polish: Wojenne dziewczyny) is a Polish World War II television drama series, broadcast on TVP1. It premiered on 5 March 2017 and has five seasons. In 2022, it became available to stream in the U.S., Canada, Australia, New Zealand and The U.K. on the streaming service Chaiflicks.

== Plot ==
The series follows the lives of three women, showing them briefly at the outbreak of the war in September 1939 before flashing forward to 1941. Ewa Fronczak is released from her prison sentence for theft on account of the falling bombs; Marysia Joachim and her family are terrorised by anti-semitic Nazi sympathisers; Irena Szczęsna helps the nurses at a hospital with the wounded. Ewa and Irka know each other from before the war; they first meet Marysia after Ewa steals her wallet, including her false identity documents, at a train station. They join the underground resistance movement and are initially appointed to serve in the small sabotage unit.

== Cast ==
- Aleksandra Pisula as Marysia Joachim
- Vanessa Aleksander as Ewa Fronczak
- Marta Mazurek as Irena 'Irka' Szczęsna
- Maja Szopa as Karolina 'Nitka' Wegierska
- Karolina Rzepa as Kapitan Magda 'Joe' Cukier
- Michał Czernecki as Witold Szczęsny
- Danuta Stenka as Irka and Witold's mother
- Józef Pawłowski as Kamil Brodzki, Irka's fiancé
- Kamil Szeptycki as Jurek Bednar
- Krzysztof Franieczek as Oskar Dietrich
- Katrin Bühring as Margarethe von Losein, Dietrich's sister
- Krzysztof Wach as sturmbannführer Kleim
- Aleksandra Justa as Henryka Brodzka
- Vinzenz Wagner as Franz Hessler

== Episodes ==
Since the 31st of October 2021, there have been 65 episodes (5 seasons) of Wojenne Dziewczyny with 13 episodes per season.

== Production ==
The series was filmed in Łódź, Lublin, Karczew, and Bielsko-Biała.
