= Józef Pawłowski =

Polish actor (born 1990)

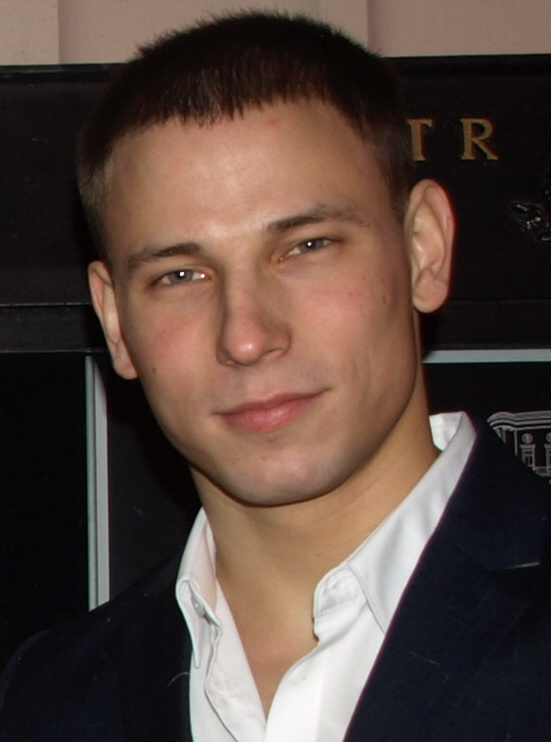
- Born: 29 August 1990 (age 35); Nowy Dwór Mazowiecki, Poland
- Occupation: Actor
- Years active: 2011–present

Józef Pawłowski (born 29 August 1990) is a Polish actor. He has appeared in more than ten films since 2011.

== Biography ==
Józef is the grandson of Jerzy Pawlowski and actress Teresa Szmigielówny. His older brother, Stefan, is also an actor.

== Selected filmography ==
Year	Title	Role
2014	Jack Strong	
2014	Warsaw 44	Stefan Zawadzki
2017	Bad Day for the Cut	Bartosz
2019	Piłsudski	Aleksander Sulkiewicz
