= Stones for the Rampart (film) =

- Theatrical release poster
- Polish: Kamienie na szaniec
- Directed by: Robert Gliński
- Screenplay by: Dominik W. Rettinger; Wojciech Pałys
- Based on: Stones for the Rampart by Aleksander Kamiński
- Produced by: Maciej Ciupinski
- Starring: Marcel Sabat; Tomasz Ziętek; Kamil Szeptycki; Sandra Staniszewska; Magdalena Koleśnik; Artur Żmijewski; Danuta Stenka; Andrzej Chyra; Krzysztof Globisz; Wojciech Zieliński
- Cinematography: Paweł Edelman
- Edited by: Krzysztof Szpetmański
- Music by: Łukasz Targosz
- Production companies: Monolith Films; Akces Film
- Distributed by: Monolith Films
- Release date: 7 March 2014 (Poland)
- Running time: 111 minutes
- Country: Poland
- Language: Polish
- Box office: $3.7 million

Stones for the Rampart (Polish: Kamienie na szaniec) is a 2014 Polish war drama film directed by Robert Gliński, based on the 1943 novel of the same name by Aleksander Kamiński.

== Plot ==
Alek, Zośka and Rudy live by a motto: "Victory is perseverance in the face of defeat." About to graduate from high school, these three young friends from Warsaw make ambitious plans for their future until the events of September 1939 change everything. They are forced into adulthood when they must make a choice – survive at all costs or join the freedom fighters and defend their homeland. Drawing on their experience as Boy Scouts, they enlist in the resistance. The story outlines their legacy of friendship, hard work, and sacrifice to fight for their country's freedom.

== Cast ==
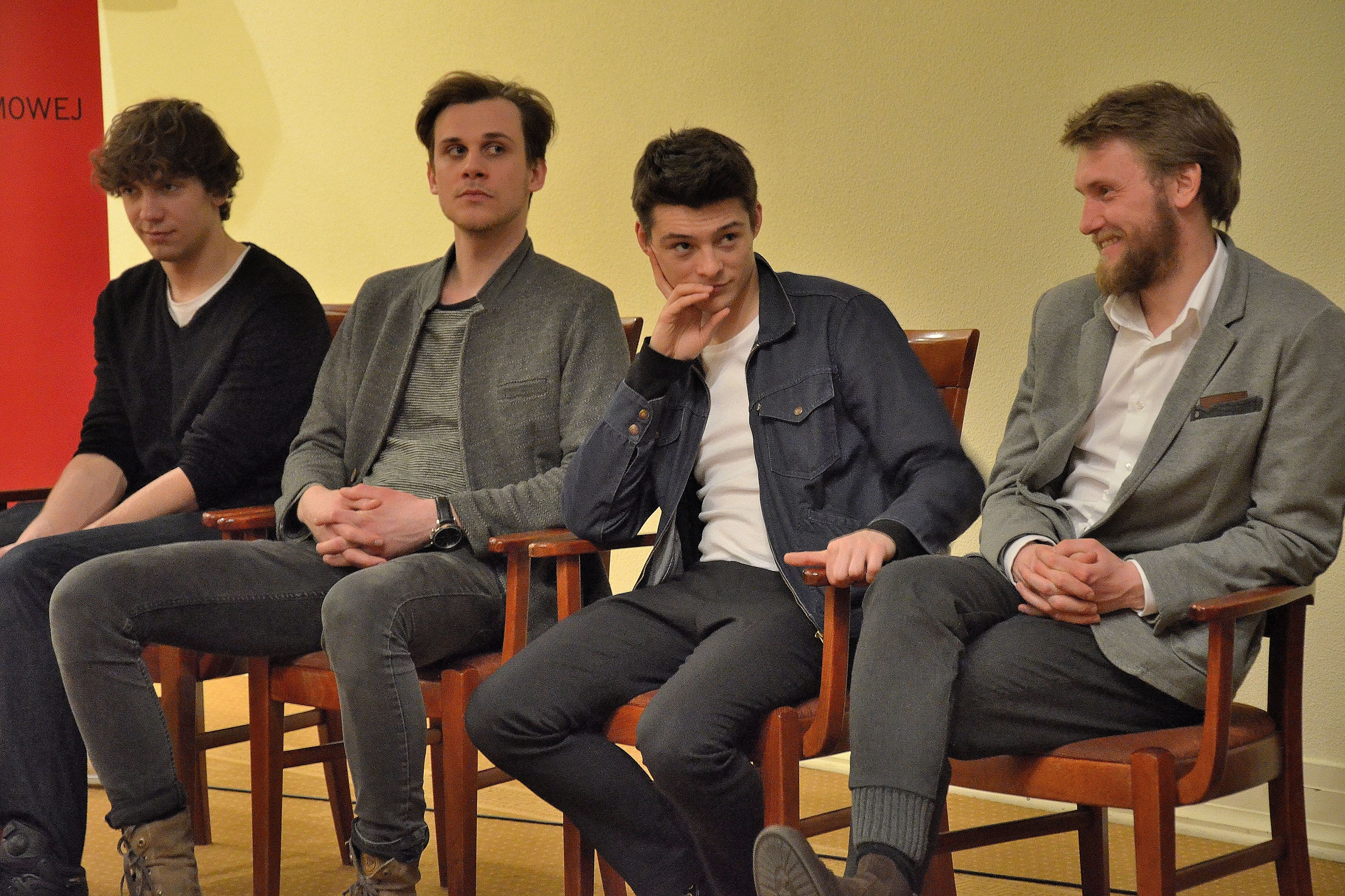
The main cast of Stones for the Rampart; from left to right: Kamil Szeptycki, Marcel Sabat, Tomasz Ziętek and Karol Górski

- Tomasz Ziętek as Jan Bytnar
- Marcel Sabat as Tadeusz Zawadzki
- Kamil Szeptycki as Maciej Aleksy Dawidowski
- Danuta Stenka as Zdzisława Bytnarowa
- Artur Żmijewski as Stanisław Bytnar
- Irena Melcer as Danuta Bytnar
- Magdalena Koleśnik as Maryna Trzcińska
