= Polish Academy Award for Best Actress =

Annual Polish film award

- Awarded for: Best Performance by an Actress in a Leading Role
- Presented by: Polish Film Academy
- First award: Agnieszka Krukówna; Farba (1999)
- Currently held by: Agata Turkot; Home Sweet Home (2026)

The Polish Academy Award for Best Actress is an annual award given to the best lead actress in Polish picture.

== Winners and nominees ==
Year	Actress	Movie title	Role
1999	Agnieszka Krukówna	Farba	Marta "Farba" ("Paint")
1999	Danuta Stenka	Cudze szczęście	Anna Kowalska
1999	Grażyna Szapołowska	Kroniki domowe	Mother
1999	Agnieszka Sitek	Zabić Sekala	Agnieszka
1999	Stanisława Celińska	Złote runo	Rysio's sister-in-law
2000	Grażyna Szapołowska	Pan Tadeusz	Telimena
2000	Magdalena Cielecka	Amok	Julia
2000	Agnieszka Krukówna	Fuks	Sonia
2000	Gosia Dobrowolska	Tydzień z życia mężczyzny	Anna Borowska
2000	Dominika Ostałowska	Wojaczek	Teresa
2001	Dominika Ostałowska	Daleko od okna	Regina Lilienstern
2001	Anna Dymna	Duże zwierzę	Maria Sawicka
2001	Maja Ostaszewska	Prymas - trzy lata z tysiąca	Sister Maria Leonia Graczyk
2001	Magdalena Cielecka	Zakochani	Zosia Karska
2001	Krystyna Janda	Życie jako śmiertelna choroba przenoszona drogą płciową	Anna
2002	Kinga Preis	Cisza	Magdalena "Mimi"
2002	Aleksandra Gietner	Cześć, Tereska	Tereska
2002	Magdalena Cielecka	Egoiści	Anka
2002	Jadwiga Jankowska-Cieślak	Szczęśliwy człowiek	Maria Sosnowska
2002	Anna Dymna	Wiedźmin	Nenneke
2003	Danuta Stenka	Chopin. Pragnienie miłości	George Sand
2003	Ewa Kaim	Anioł w Krakowie	Hanka
2003	Emilia Fox	Pianista	Dorota
2003	Edyta Olszówka	Tam i z powrotem	Krystyna
2003	Katarzyna Figura	Zemsta	Podstolina Hanna
2004	Katarzyna Figura	Żurek	Halina Iwanek
2004	Maja Ostaszewska	Przemiany	Marta Mycińska
2004	Aleksandra Prószyńska	Zmruż oczy	"Mała" ("Little")
2005	Krystyna Feldman	Mój Nikifor	Nikifor
2005	Agnieszka Grochowska	Pręgi	Tania
2005	Katarzyna Figura	Ubu król	Ubica
2006	Kinga Preis	Komornik	Nurse Gosia Bednarek
2006	Jolanta Fraszyńska	Skazany na bluesa	Małgorzata "Gola" Riedel
2006	Krystyna Janda	The Call of the Toad	Aleksandra Piątkowska
2007	Jowita Budnik	Plac Zbawiciela	Beata Zielińska
2007	Karolina Gruszka	Kochankowie z Marony	Ola
2007	Kinga Preis	Statyści	Bożena Popławka-Ochman
2008	Danuta Szaflarska	Pora umierać	Aniela
2008	Krystyna Janda	Parę osób, mały czas	Jadwiga Stańczakowa
2008	Sonia Bohosiewicz	Rezerwat	Hanka B.
2009	Jadwiga Jankowska-Cieślak	Rysa	Joanna Kocjan
2009	Kinga Preis	Cztery noce z Anną	Nurse Anna
2009	Svetlana Khodchenkova	Mała Moskwa	Viera Svetlova
2010	Agata Buzek	Rewers	Sabina Jankowska
2010	Kinga Preis	Dom zły	Bożena Dziabasowa
2010	Krystyna Janda	Tatarak	Mrs. Marta/Actress
2011	Urszula Grabowska	Joanna	Joanna Kurska
2011	Magdalena Boczarska	Różyczka	Kamila Sakowicz "Różyczka" ("Little Rose")
2011	Olga Frycz	Wszystko co kocham	Basia
2012	Agata Kulesza	Róża	Róża Kwiatkowska
2012	Roma Gąsiorowska	Ki	Kinga "Ki"
2012	Agnieszka Grochowska	W ciemności	Klara Keller
2013	Agnieszka Grochowska	Bez wstydu	Anka
2013	Weronika Rosati	Obława	"Pestka" ("Seed")
2013	Danuta Szaflarska	Pokłosie	The elderly herbalist
2014	Agata Kulesza	Ida	Wanda Gruz
2014	Jowita Budnik	Papusza	Bronisława Wajs "Papusza"
2014	Agnieszka Grochowska	Wałęsa. Człowiek z nadziei	Danuta Wałęsa
2015	Maja Ostaszewska	Jack Strong	Hanna Kuklińska
2015	Zofia Wichłacz	Miasto 44	Alicja "Biedronka" ("Ladybug")
2015	Agata Kulesza	All About My Parents	Krzysztof's mother
2016	Maja Ostaszewska	Body/Ciało	Therapist Anna
2016	Agata Kulesza	Moje córki krowy	Marta Makowska
2016	Gabriela Muskała	Moje córki krowy	Kasia
2017	Aleksandra Konieczna	Ostatnia rodzina	Zofia Beksińska
2017	Dorota Kolak	Zjednoczone stany miłości	Renata
2017	Michalina Łabacz	Wołyń	Zosia Głowacka- Skiba
2018	Magdalena Boczarska	Sztuka kochania	Michalina Wisłocka
2018	Karolina Gruszka	Maria Skłodowska-Curie	Maria Skłodowska-Curie
2018	Agnieszka Mandat	Pokot	Janina Duszejko
2019	Joanna Kulig	Zimna wojna	Zula Lichoń
2019	Gabriela Muskała	Fuga	Alicja / Kinga
2019	Anna Radwan	Kamerdyner	Countess Gerda von Krauss
2020	Krystyna Janda	Słodki koniec dnia	Maria Linde
2020	Dorota Kolak	Zabawa, zabawa	Teresa Malicka
2020	Aleksandra Konieczna	Boże Ciało	Lidia
2020	Agata Kulesza	Zabawa, zabawa	Dorota
2020	Maria Sobocińska	Pan T.	Dagna
2021	Agata Kulesza	25 lat niewinności. Sprawa Tomka Komendy	Teresa Klemańska
2021	Zofia Domalik	Wszystko dla mojej matki	Ola
2021	Maja Ostaszewska	Śniegu już nigdy nie będzie	Maria
2021	Agata Kulesza	Śniegu już nigdy nie będzie	Ewa
2021	Zofia Stafiej	Jak najdalej stąd	Ola Hudzik
2022	Agata Buzek	My Wonderful Life	Joanna 'Jo' Lisiecka
2022	Sandra Korzeniak	Żeby nie było śladów	Barbara Sadowska
2022	Jasna Đuričić	Quo Vadis, Aida?	Aida Selmanagić
2022	Maria Debska	Bo we mnie jest seks	Kalina Jedrusik
2022	Magdalena Koleśnik	Sweat	Sylvia Zajac
2023	Dorota Pomykała	Kobieta na dachu	Mira Napieralska
2023	Katarzyna Figura	Chrzciny	Marianna
2023	Agnieszka Grochowska	Fucking Bornholm	Maja Malecka
2023	Sandra Drzymalska	EO	Kasandra
2023	Małgorzata Gorol	Śubuk	Maryśka
2024	Magdalena Cielecka	Lęk	Malgorzata
2024	Kamila Urzędowska	Chłopi	Jagna
2024	Lena Góra	Imago	Ela Malwina
2024	Marta Nieradkiewicz	Lęk	Lucja
2024	Maja Ostaszewska	Zielona Granica	Julia
2025	Vic Carmen Sonne	Dziewczyna z igłą	Karoline
2025	Sandra Drzymalska	Biała odwaga	Bronka
2025	Sandra Drzymalska	Simona Kossak	Simona Kossak
2025	Małgorzata Hajewska-Krzysztofik	Kobieta z...	Aniela
2025	Michalina Olszańska	Kulej. Dwie strony medalu	Helena Jankiewicz-Kulej
2026	Agata Turkot	Home Sweet Home	Gośka Nowak
2026	Agnieszka Grochowska	Brother	Agnieszka
2026	Izabela Kuna	The In-Laws 3	Wanda Chrapek
2026	Izabella Dudziak	No Ghosts on Good Street	Nastka
2026	Matylda Giegżno	Photosensitive	Agata

== Multiple awards and nominations ==
Wins	Actor	Nominations
3	Agata Kulesza	7
2	Maja Ostaszewska	6
2	Kinga Preis	5
2	Agata Buzek	2
1	Agnieszka Grochowska	5
1	Magdalena Cielecka	4
1	Katarzyna Figura	4
1	Aleksandra Konieczna	2
0	Sandra Drzymalska	3
