= Justyna Wasilewska =

Polish actress (born 1985)

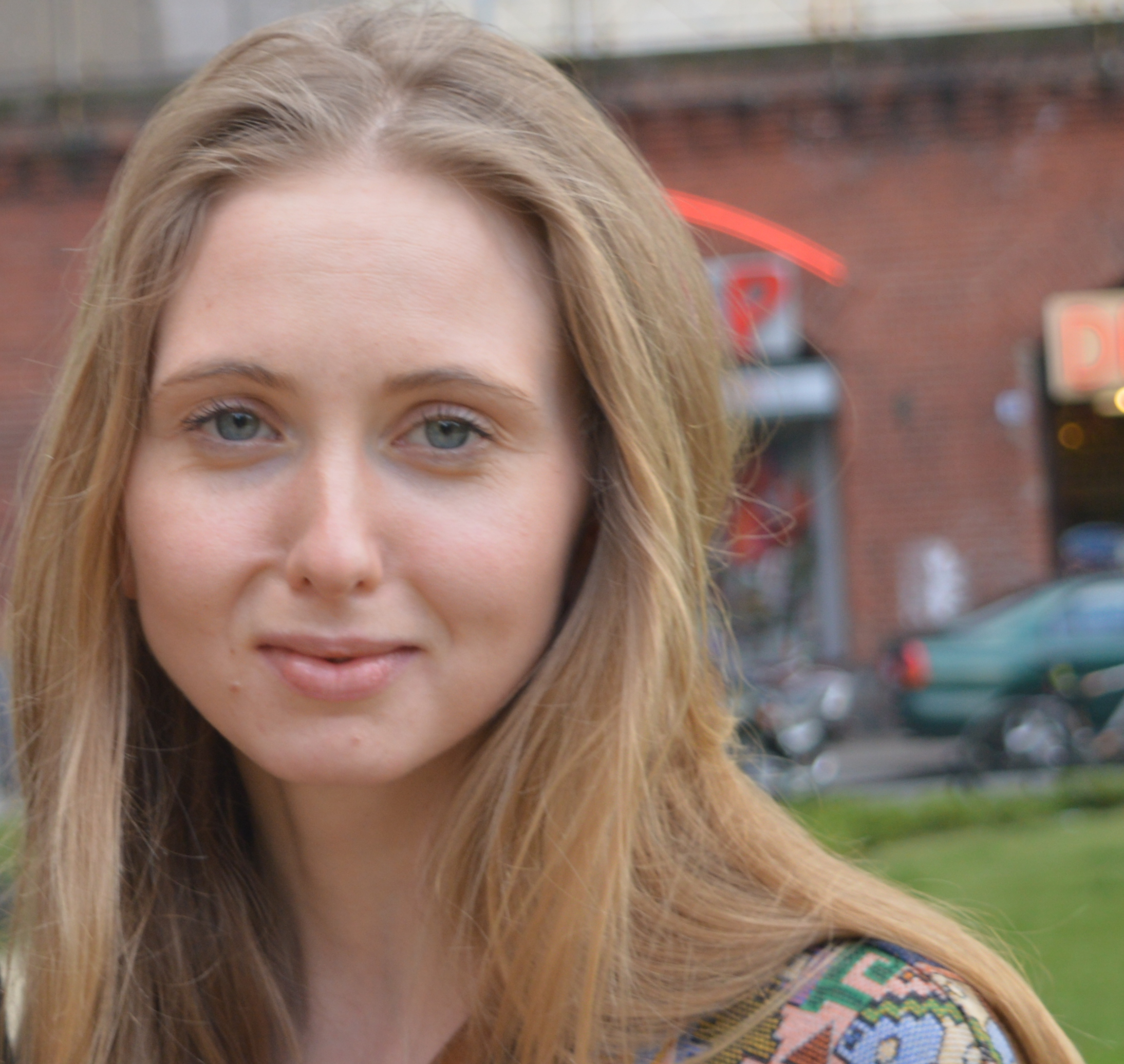
- Wasilewska in 2015
- Born: 28 November 1985 (age 40); Wrocław, Poland
- Education: Łódź Film School
- Occupation: Actress
- Years active: 2009–present

Justyna Wasilewska (Polish pronunciation: [jusˈtɨna vaɕiˈlɛfska]; born 28 November 1985) is a Polish actress.

== Biography ==
Wasilewska was born in Wrocław. She has an older brother. A graduate of the Łódź Film School, she made her stage debut in 2009. She began working at TR Warszawa in 2014. She played Maja in the premiere of Kornél Mundruczó's play Pieces of a Woman at TR Warszawa, which was later adapted into a film of the same name starring Vanessa Kirby.

She came out as queer in 2022.

== Acting credits ==
=== Film ===
Year	Title	Role	Ref.
2009	Druciki	Magda's friend	
2011	Letters to Santa	Woman	
2014	Dżej Dżej	Ziuta Kempa	
2014	Kebab & Horoscope	Intern	
2015	Król życia	Nurse Stenia	
2016	Czułość	Maria Motz	
2017	The Art of Loving	Wanda	
2017	Beyond Words	Alina	
2017	Heart of Love	Zuzanna Bartoszek	
2018	Playing Hard	Kaśka	
2019	Icarus: The Legend of Mietek Kosz	Zuza	
2020	Tarapaty 2	Guide	
2021	The Auschwitz Report	Woman in forest	
2022	Inni ludzie	Matka Boska	
2023	Imago	Irenka	

=== Television ===
Year	Title	Role	Notes	Ref.
2008	Samo życie	Nina Torstensson	1 episode	
2010–2011	Hotel 52	Julia	19 episodes	
2010–2021	Father Matthew	Magda Chechło; Marzena Rela; Matylda Iskierska	3 episodes	
2011	Days of Honor	Weronika	2 episodes	
2014–2015	Na dobre i na złe	Beata	2 episodes	
2017	Komisarz Alex	Dorota Olczyk	1 episode	
2017	Druga szansa	Szara	9 episodes	
2020–2022	Nieobecni	Mila Gajda	20 episodes	
2022	Hold Tight	Wiera	5 episodes	
2022–2023	Krucjata	Wiktoria Dymińska	7 episodes	
2025	Heweliusz	Kaczkowska	4 episodes	
2026	Wśród nocnej ciszy	Irena Karaś		

=== Theater ===
Year	Title	Role	Venue	Ref.
2011	Barbelo, o psach i dzieciach	Milena	Stefan Jaracz Theatre	
2011	Życie seksualne dzikich	Aria	Nowy Teatr	
2013	Poczet królów polskich	Mieszko I	Helena Modrzejewska National Old Theatre	
2013	Do Damaszku	Wife	Helena Modrzejewska National Old Theatre	
2014	Druga kobieta	Talia	TR Warszawa	
2015	Męczennicy	Lidka	TR Warszawa	
2015	Balladyna	Balladyna	Jerzy Szaniawski Theater	
2015	Możliwość wyspy	Esther	TR Warszawa	
2016	Locus Solus		Volksbühne	
2016	Nietoperz	Magda	TR Warszawa	
2017	Moja walka	Linda	TR Warszawa	
2017	Kalifornia / Grace Slick		TR Warszawa	
2018	Męczennicy	Lidka	TR Warszawa	
2018	Pieces of a Woman	Maja	TR Warszawa	
2020	2020: Burza	Ariel	TR Warszawa	
2024	Orfeusz	Orpheus	TR Warszawa	
