= Magdalena Cielecka =

Polish actress (born 1972)

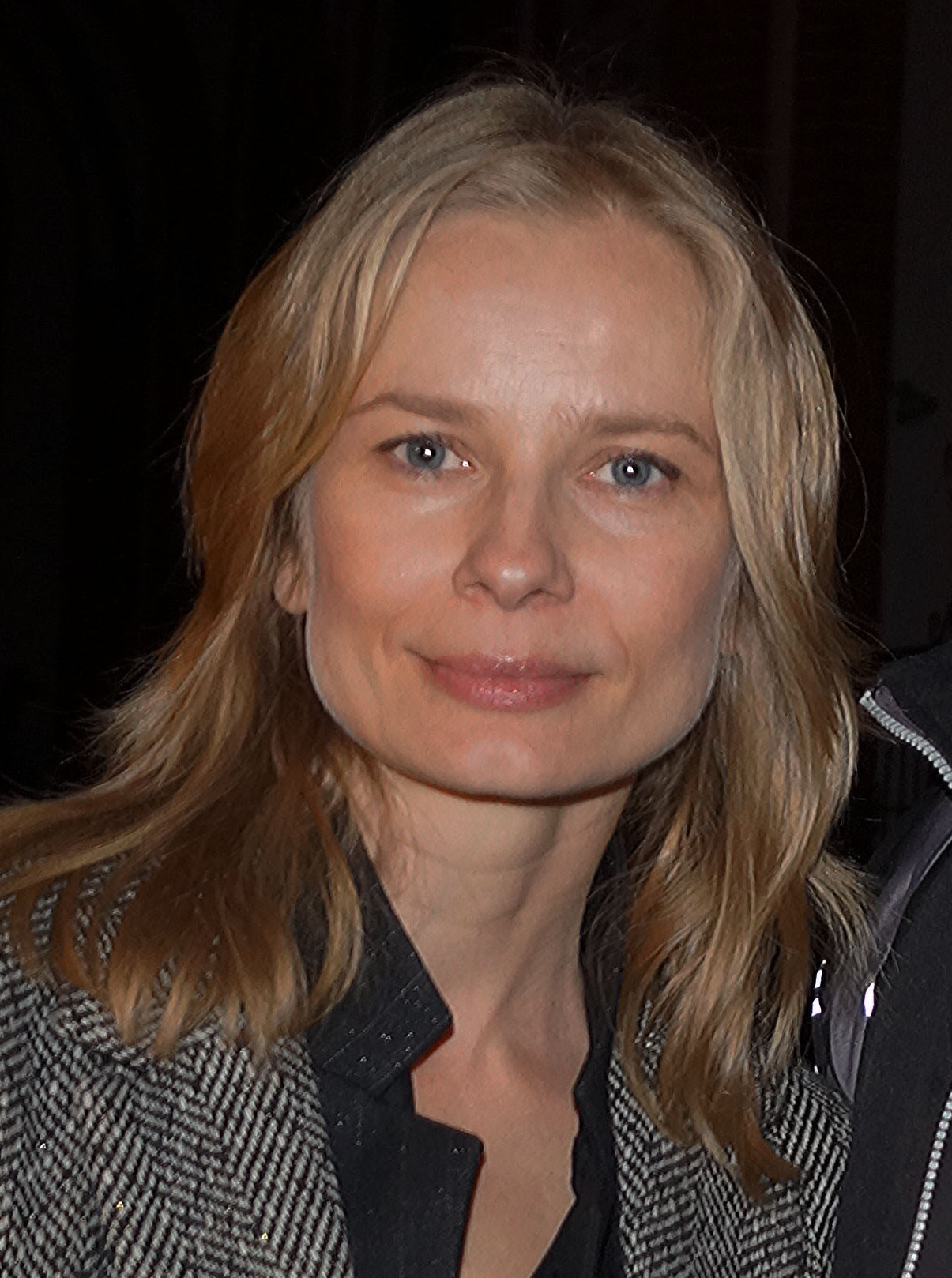
- Cielecka in 2016
- Born: 20 February 1972 (age 54); Myszków, Poland
- Education: AST National Academy of Theatre Arts in Kraków
- Occupation: Actress
- Years active: 1995–present
- Partner(s): Andrzej Chyra; Bartosz Gelner

Magdalena Lucyna Cielecka (born 20 February 1972) is a Polish actress. A five-time Polish Film Award nominee, Cielecka won the Polish Academy Award for Best Actress for her performance in the 2023 historical drama film Anxiety.

== Life and career ==
Cielecka spent her childhood in the small town of Żarki-Letnisko. In 1995, she graduated from Państwowa Wyższa Szkoła Teatralna in Kraków. Soon after, she joined the Teatr Stary Theatre Company in Kraków, where she stayed until 2001, when she moved to Warsaw and joined the Teatr Rozmaitości Theatre Company.

Although she made her first cinema appearance quite early in a film by Barbara Sass called Pokuszenie (1995), she initially was known mainly for her work in theatre. A few years later she became widely recognized as an actress and she gained popularity with her cinematic roles such as Samotność w sieci or the TV series Magda M.

At the 2008 Edinburgh International Festival she played the leading role in a critically acclaimed adaptation of Kane's 4.48 Psychosis by the Polish theatre company Teatr Rozmaitości.

On television, she starred in Hotel 52 (2010-13), Days of Honor (2012-13), Pact (2015), Belfer (2016), The Defence (2018-2022), and A Girl and an Astronaut (2023).

== Filmography ==
Year	Title	Role	Notes
1995	Temptation	Anna	Polish Film Festival Award for Best Actress
1996	L'Élève	Jeune fille polonaise	
1998	Amok	Julia	Nominated — Polish Academy Award for Best Actress
1999	Like a Drug	Anna Piwowska	
2000	Zakochani (2000)	Zosia Karska	Nominated — Polish Academy Award for Best Actress
2000	Egoiści	Anka	Nominated — Polish Academy Award for Best Actress
2001	Weiser	Clerk	
2001	Listy miłosne	Teresa Lenart	
2002	Faithful	Elisa	Short film
2003	Powiedz to, Gabi	Baska	
2004	Trzeci	Ewa	
2005	Po sezonie	Emilia Orlowska	
2006	Palimpsest	Hanna	
2006	Chaos	Hanna von Bronheim	
2006	S@motność w sieci	Ewa	
2007	Katyń	Agnieszka Baszkowska	
2009	Mniejsze zlo	Actress	
2009	Demakijaz	Anita	
2010	Wenecja	Joanna	Nominated — Polish Academy Award for Best Supporting Actress
2012	Byl sobie dzieciak	Irena	
2015	The Lure	Divine Furs	
2016	United States of Love	Iza	
2016	Blind Love	Herself	
2016	Pitbull. Niebezpieczne kobiety	Lieutenant Izabela Zych	
2017	Heart of Love	Curator	
2017	Gwiazdy	Anna Banas	
2017	Breaking the Limits	Jerzy's mother	
2018	7 Emotions	Alek's mother	
2019	Ciemno, prawie noc	Alicja Tabor	
2019	The Song of Names	Anna Wozniak	
2020	Kill It and Leave This Town	Girl's Mother on the Tram	Voice
2023	You Were Not Supposed to Be Here	Joanna	
2023	Anxiety	Malgorzata	Polish Academy Award for Best Actress
2024	Unpredictable	Alicja	
2024	Drużyna A(A)	Klementyna 'Celniczka'	
