= Playing Hard =

2018 Polish drama film by Kinga Debska

- Directed by: Kinga Debska
- Written by: Kinga Debska
- Produced by: Kinga Debska; Zbigniew Domagalski
- Starring: Agata Kulesza; Dorota Kolak; Maria Debska; Marcin Dorocinski; Barbara Jonak
- Cinematography: Andrzej Wojciechowski
- Edited by: Bartosz Karczynski
- Music by: Michal Novinski
- Production companies: Studio Filmowe Kalejdoskop; Polish Film Institute; Warsaw Documentary Film Studio
- Distributed by: Kino Świat (Poland)
- Release dates: 20 September 2018 (Gdynia Film Festival); 4 January 2019
- Country: Poland
- Language: Polish
- Box office: $2,323,646

Playing Hard (Polish: Zabawa, Zabawa, lit. 'fun, fun') is a 2018 Polish drama film directed and written by Kinga Dębska. The film stars Agata Kulesza, Dorota Kolak, Maria Debska, Marcin Dorocinski and Barbara Jonak. The film follows the lives of three different women: the middle-aged prosecutor Dorota, the young student Magda and a distinguished surgeon, Teresa, and their struggling with alcohol addiction.

The film premiered at the 2018 Gdynia Film Festival receiving Golden Lions nomination for Best Film. It was released in Poland on January 4, 2019. The film received International Festival of Independent Cinema Off Camera Award for cast performance. At the 22nd Polish Film Awards, it received two nominations for Best Actress (Kulesza and Kolak).

== Cast ==
- Agata Kulesza as Dorota
- Dorota Kolak as Teresa
- Maria Debska as Magda
- Marcin Dorocinski as Jerzy
- Barbara Jonak as Beata
- Mirosław Baka as Wiktor
- Dorota Landowska as Barbara
- Przemysław Bluszcz as Mieczysław
- Jowita Budnik as Girl's mother
- Tomasz Sapryk as Psychologist Wojtek
