= Teatr Rozmaitości =

Teatr Rozmaitości (Polish for "variety theatre") may refer to the following theatres in Poland:

- Variety Theatre in Kraków
- Variety Theatre in Radom, late 19th - early 20th centuries
- Variety Theatre in Warsaw (since 1948)
- Varsaw Variety Theatre (historical), late 19th - early 20th centuries
