= Irena Trapszo =

Irena Trapszo-Chodowiecka
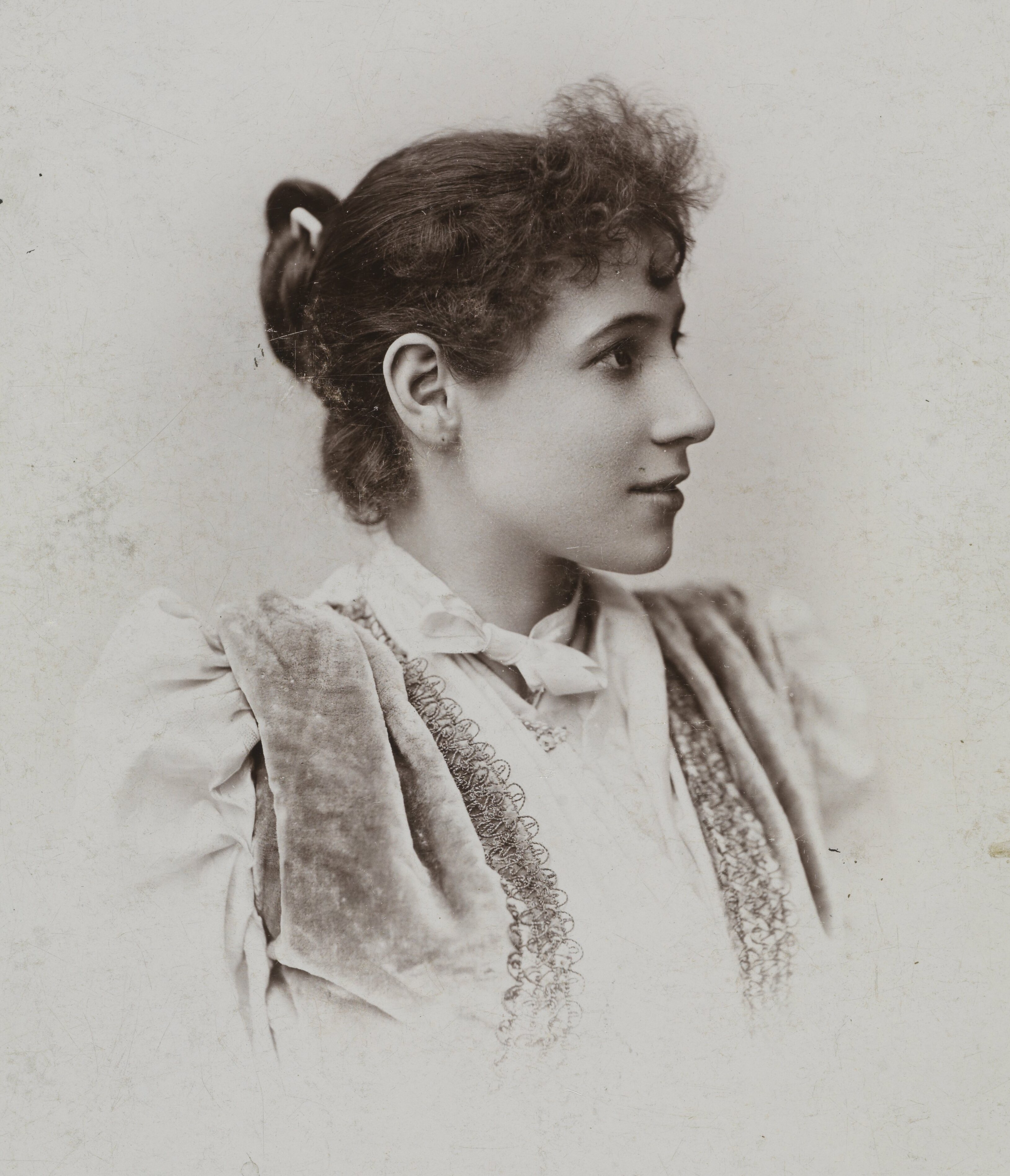
- Born: 16 February 1868; Kalisz
- Died: 8 April 1953 (aged 85)
- Occupation: Theater Actress

Irena Trapszo-Chodowiecka (born 16 February 1868 in Kalisz; died 8 April 1953 in Lviv) was a Polish theater actress, performance recitalist and teacher in the Lviv Drama School.

== Biography ==
Irena Trapszo was the daughter of Anastaze and Anna Eugenia Valeria. She was born as an illegitimate child because the parents sanctioned the relationship several years after her birth. As a child, she performed with her father's band in the province. After her mother's death, she went to Warsaw. She performed in government theaters in Warsaw, including at the Rozmaitosci Theater and the Summer Theater. In 1907 she moved to Lvov, where she became an actress of the Municipal Theater. In 1927 she retired.

Her sister was Tekla Trapszo. Irena Trapszo-Chodowiecka was Mieczysław Ćwiklinska's aunt. Her husband since 1893 was Edward Chodowiecki. She died in 1953. She was buried at Lychakiv Cemetery in Lviv.

== Theater performances ==
- 1894 - Fat fish, Teatr Rozmaitości in Warsaw
- 1910 - Golden handcuffs, Lviv City Theater
- 1912 - Nervous break, Lviv City Theater
- 1915 - Natręci, Municipal Theater of Lviv

== Decorations ==
- Golden Cross of Merit (1938)

== Bibliography ==
- Maria Bojarska: Mieczysław Ćwiklińska. Warsaw: National Institute of Publishing, 1988. ISBN 83-06-01370-0.
- Adam Grzymała-Siedlecki: The acting world of my time. Warsaw: National Publishing Institute, 1957.
