= Gabriela Muskała =

Polish actress

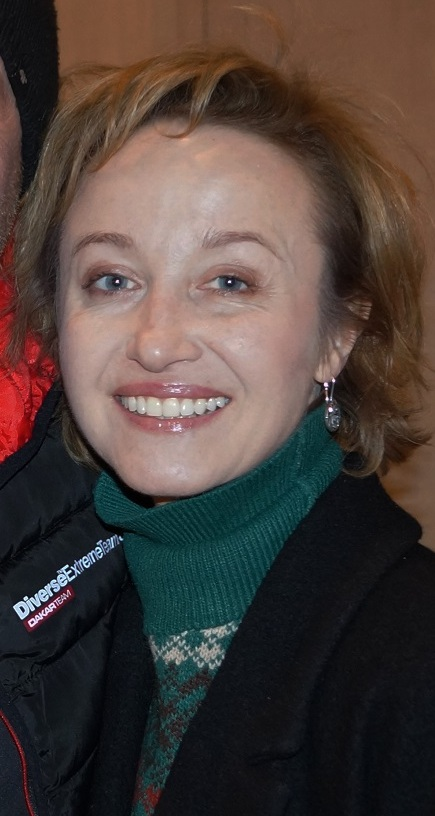
- Muskała in 2019
- Born: June 11, 1969 (age 55); Kłodzko, Poland

Gabriela Muskała (born 11 June 1969) is a Polish actress, screenwriter and director.

== Life and career ==
Muskała was born in Kłodzko, Poland, and graduated from the Łódź Film School in 1994. Since 1997 she performed in the Stefan Jaracz Theatre and from 2005 in the Dramatic Theatre in Warsaw. In same time, Muskała began appearing in film and television, playing supporting and leading roles. She was a regular cast member in television series The Londoners, Paradoks and Gleboka woda. In 2013, Muskała received Gloria Artis Medal for Merit to Culture.

Muskała received Gdynia Film Festival Award for Best Supporting Actress for her performance in the 2011 action drama film, Courage. She later starred opposite Agata Kulesza in the comedy-drama film These Daughters of Mine (2015), for which she received her first Polish Academy Award for Best Actress nomination. In 2018 she wrote the script and starred in the drama film Fugue, for which she received positive reviews from critics and Polish Film Award for Discovery of Year. Muskała also received her second Polish Academy Award for Best Actress nomination, and also Best Supporting Actress nomination for 7 Feelings. From 2023 to 2024 she starred opposite Agata Kulesza in the crime drama series, The Convict. In 2023, she wrote and directed the drama film, The Clowns.

== Selected filmography ==
- Conversation with a Cupboard Man (1993)
- One Long Winter Without Fire (2004)
- Zero (2009)
- Janosik: A True Story (2009)
- The General: The Gibraltar Assassination (2009)
- Courage (2011)
- Life Feels Good (2013)
- These Daughters of Mine (2015)
- Volhynia (2016)
- Fugue (2018)
- Nobody Sleeps in the Woods Tonight (2020)
- Inheritance (2024)
