= Trick (2010 film) =

- Directed by: Jan Hryniak
- Screenplay by: Michał J. Zabłocki
- Starring: Piotr Adamczyk; Karolina Gruszka; Andrzej Chyra; Robert Więckiewicz
- Cinematography: Piotr Śliskowski
- Edited by: Wojciech Włodarski
- Music by: Paweł Mykietyn
- Production company: Aromer S.C.
- Distributed by: Kino Świat
- Release date: March 9, 2010
- Running time: 95 minutes
- Country: Poland
- Language: Polish
- Budget: 4,651,916 Polish złoty

Trick is a 2010 Polish-language comedy thriller film directed by Jan Hryniak and written by Michał J. Zabłocki. It premiered on 9 March 2010.

== Plot ==
Marek Kowalewski is a talented counterfeiter, who is jailed for counterfeiting United States dollars. In there, he shares his cell with an intelligent older man, Witek, who is nicknamed "Professor". One day, the Taliban kidnaps a member of parliament of Sejm, and Polish government officials offer Kowalewski a deal. He would have to counterfeit 6 million US dollars, which they would then use to pay the ransom to the Taliban. In exchange, Kowalewski would receive freedom.

== Cast ==
- Piotr Adamczyk as Marek Kowalewski
- Karolina Gruszka as Elżbieta, Marek's girlfriend
- Andrzej Chyra as agent Bukowski
- Robert Więckiewicz as agent Sieradzki
- Marian Dziędziel as Witek "Professor"
- Agnieszka Warchulska as Jowita
- Edward Żentara as the Deputy Prime Minister of Poland
- Grażyna Szapołowska as Markiewiczowa
- Jerzy Trela as Bąk
- Jacek Rozenek as Konar
- Joachim Lamża as Knappe
- Łukasz Simlat as Robert
- Marta Dąbrowska as Bąk's secretary
- Eryk Lubos as Kosa
- Bartłomiej Topa as Szuler
- Henryk Talar as Szewczyk
- Ryszard Radwański as Walczyk
- Aleksander Mikołajczak as the representative Ministry of Foreign Affairs

== Production ==
The film was directed by Jan Hryniak and written by Michał J. Zabłocki. The cinematography was done by Piotr Śliskowski, music by Paweł Mykietyn, scenography by Wojciech Żogała, and editing by Wojciech Włodarski. It had the budget of 4,651,916 Polish złoty, and was produced by Aromer S.C. in Poland, and distributed by Kino Świat. The film was filmed in May 2009, in Poland, in Warsaw, Pruszków, Pilchowice, Szklarska Poręba, Warsaw, and Wołów, and in Manhattan, New York City, United States. It stars Piotr Adamczyk, Karolina Gruszka, Andrzej Chyra, and Robert Więckiewicz. The film premiered on 9 March 2010. On 12 March 2010, it was released in cinemas, where it was watched by over 300,000 people.

== Accolades ==
Accolades received by WALL-E
Award	Year	Category	Recipients	Result
2010	Gdynia Film Festival	Best Music	Paweł Mykietyn	Won
2010	Golden Rooster Awards	Best Foreign Film Actor	Piotr Adamczyk	Won
