= Poznań '56 =

- Directed by: Filip Bajon
- Screenplay by: Filip Bajon, Andrzej Górny
- Produced by: Filip Bajon
- Starring: Michał Żebrowski, Tadeusz Szymków, Mateusz Hornung, Arkadiusz Walkowiak
- Music by: Michał Lorenc
- Production companies: Studio Filmowe Dom, Telewizja Polska, Fundacja Poznań 56
- Release dates: 22 November 1996; 19 November 1999 (France)
- Running time: 106 minutes
- Country: Poland
- Language: Polish

Poznań '56 is a Polish historical film directed by Filip Bajon about the Poznań 1956 protests. It was released in 1996. Premiered at the 1996 Polish Film Festival, the film won seven awards including Special Jury Prize. Despite this, Poznań '56 was controversial for audience.

== Cast ==
- Michał Żebrowski as Zenek
- Tadeusz Szymków as Stachu Kaczmarek
- Mateusz Hornung as Piotrek
- Arkadiusz Walkowiak as Darek
- Agata Kulesza as Teacher Zoska
- Grzegorz Wons as Darek's Father
- Robert Więckiewicz as Worker
- Olaf Lubaszenko as Soldier
- Bronisław Pawlik as Piotrek's Grandfather
- Antonina Choroszy as Piotrek's Mother
- Slawa Kwasniewska as Piotrek's Aunt
- Maciej Kozłowski as UB Man
- Władysław Kowalski as Professor
- Daniel Olbrychski as Professor
- Janusz Gajos as Professor
- Jan Nowicki as Professor
- Jerzy Radziwiłowicz as Professor
- Andrzej Szczytko as Doctor
