= Karolina Gruszka =

Polish actress (born 1980)

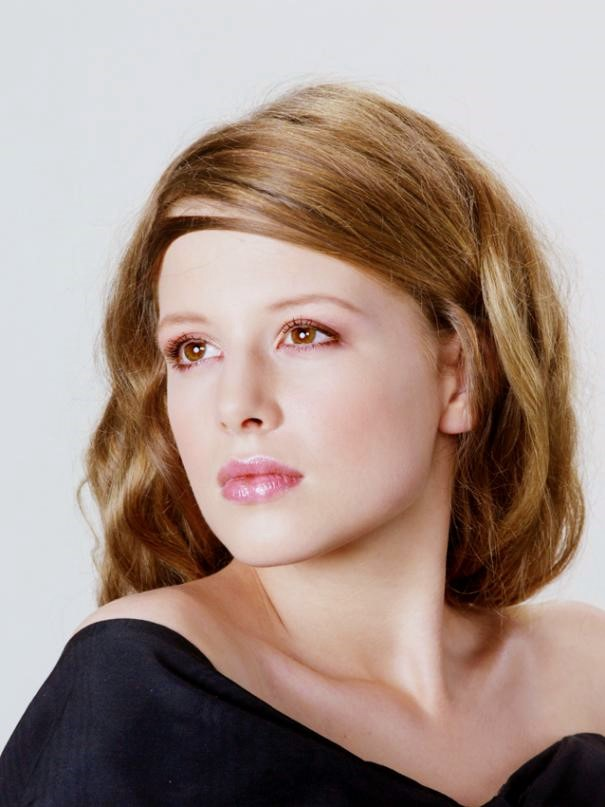
- Gruszka in 2008
- Born: 13 July 1980 (age 46); Warsaw, Poland
- Occupation: Actress
- Years active: 1996-present
- Spouse: Ivan Vyrypaev (2007-)
- Children: 1

Karolina Gruszka (born 13 July 1980) is a Polish actress, who appeared in Polish and international film, stage and television productions. She is five-time Polish Film Awards-nominee: two times for Best Actress in The Lovers of Marona (2005) and Marie Curie: The Courage of Knowledge (2016), and three times for Best Supporting Actress in All About My Parents (2014), Lullaby Killer (2017) and Chopin, a Sonata in Paris (2025).

== Life and career ==
Gruszka was born in Warsaw, Poland and made her television debut as the age of nine and in 1998 made her big screen debut starring in the comedy film Spona, receiving Award at the Ale Kino! International Young Audience Film Festival. Her big break came in 2000, starring as Masha Mironova in the Russian drama film, The Captain's Daughter, the adaptation of the historical novel The Captain's Daughter (1836) by Alexander Pushkin. The following year she starred in another Russian film, the war action In August of 1944. The same time she starred in Polish films Keep Away from the Window (2000), Przedwiosnie (2001) and Bez litosci (2002). In 2003 she graduated from the Aleksander Zelwerowicz National Academy of Dramatic Art in Warsaw. From 2003 to 2008 she performed on National Theatre, Warsaw.

In 2005, Gruszka received Best Actress Award at the Gdynia Film Festival, the Zbigniew Cybulski Award and the nomination for Polish Academy Award for Best Actress for her performance in the musical drama film, The Lovers of Marona directed by Izabella Cywińska. The following year she starred in the psychological thriller film Inland Empire directed by David Lynch premiered at the 63rd Venice International Film Festival. After she married Russian playwright and director Ivan Vyrypaev, Gruszka mostly appeared in plays written and directed by him, such as July (2009), Delhi' Dance (2010) and Unbearably Long Embraces (2015). She worked with Vyrypaev on films and stage productions, in Poland and Russia. In 2009 she played the lead role in the Russian drama film, Oxygen and in 2012 in the Belarusian drama Viva Belarus!. In 2010 she received Czech Lion Award for Best Actress in Leading Role nomination for her performance in film, 3 Seasons in Hell. In 2015 she received Polish Academy Award for Best Supporting Actress nomination for performance in the comedy-drama film, All About My Parents.

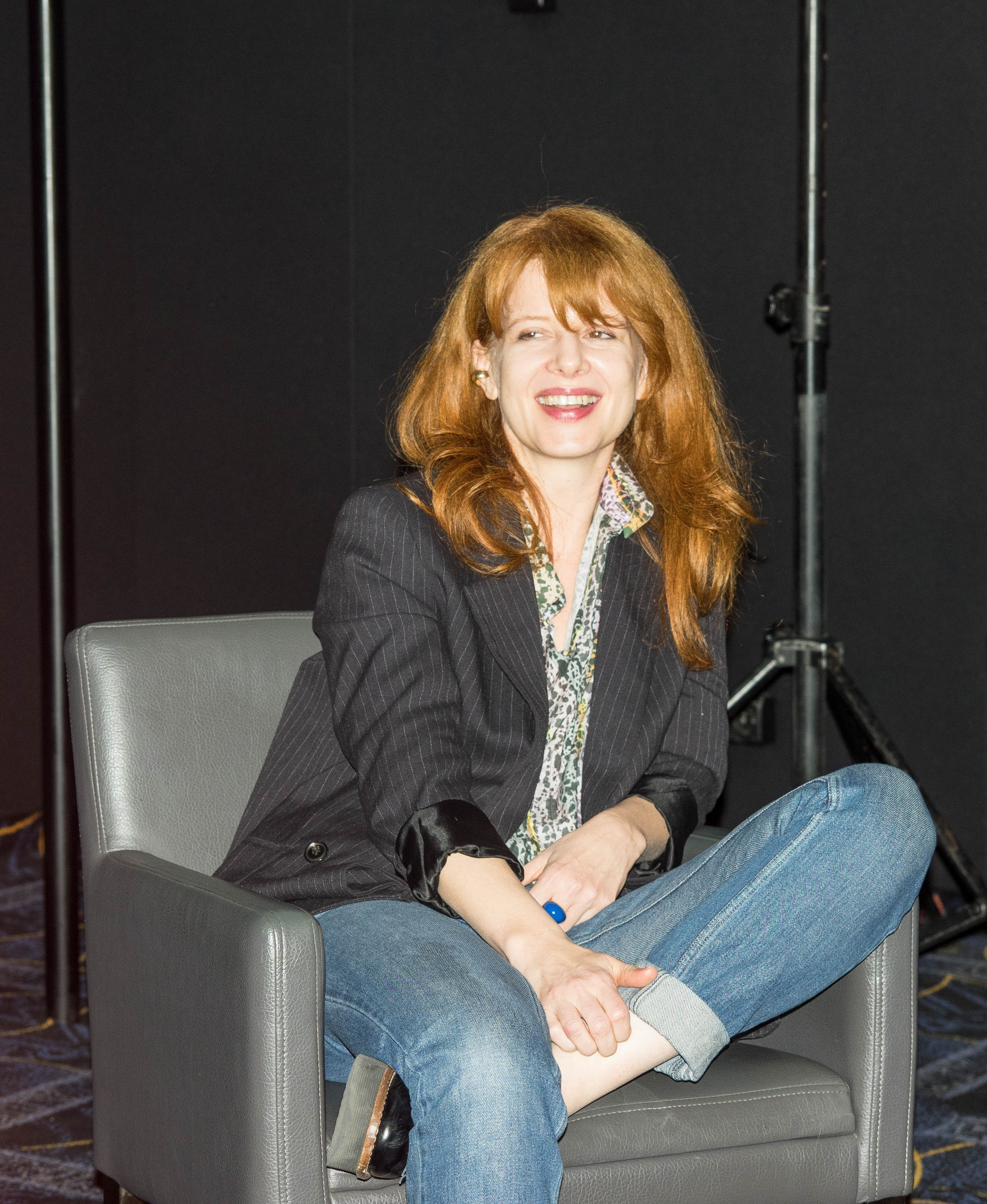
Gruszka in 2025

In 2016, Gruszka played physicist and chemist Marie Curie in the internationally co-produced biographical drama film, Marie Curie: The Courage of Knowledge. The film received positive reviews and her performance gained another Polish Academy Award nomination for Best Actress. In 2018 she starred in the Swedish-Russian television series, Moscow Noir. In 2019, she appeared in the Icelandic movie Gullregn (English: Goldrain), directed by Ragnar Bragason. Although she previously did not know the language, she had to perform all her lines in Icelandic. Following 2022 Russian invasion of Ukraine she left the Russia with Vyrypaev. After She returned to Poland starring in the television series Kod genetyczny (2020), Królestwo kobiet (2020), Nieobecni (2022), Dom pod Dwoma Orłami (2023) and Gra z cieniem (2024). In 2023 she appeared in the drama film, The American starring Diane Kruger. In 2025 she starred alongside Bogusław Linda in the thriller film Operation Pope (2025) and played Delfina Potocka in the biographical drama film, Chopin, a Sonata in Paris. The role gained her another Polish Academy Award nomination for Best Supporting Actress. Also in 2025 she starred in the second season of HBO Max crime drama series, Pati, and the Disney+ period crime drama series, The Breslau Murders. In 2026 she was cast in the Netflix medical drama, Anesthesia.

== Personal life ==
Gruszka married Russian director Ivan Vyrypaev, they have one daughter, born in 2012. She has worked with Vyrypaev on films and stage productions, in Poland and Russia. She is vegetarian.

Gruszka announced on November 21, 2021 that she had received a diagnosis of multiple sclerosis a four years before.

== Filmography ==
=== Film ===
Year	Title	Role	Notes
1996	Miss Nobody		uncredited
1998	Spona	Ola	Ale Kino! International Young Audience Film Festival Award for Best Young Actress
2000	The Captain's Daughter	Masha Mironova	
2000	Keep Away from the Window	Helusia	
2001	Przedwiośnie	Wanda Okszyńska	
2001	In August of 1944	Yuliya	
2002	Bez litosci	Nika	
2003	An Ancient Tale: When the Sun Was a God	Dziwa	
2004	Break Point	Asia	
2005	The Lovers of Marona	Ola	Gdynia Film Festival for Best Actress; Zbigniew Cybulski Award for Best Actress; Nominated — Polish Academy Award for Best Actress
2005	The French Trick	Magda	
2006	We're All Christs	Weronika	
2006	Inland Empire	Lost Girl	
2007	Futro	Joanna Panasiuk	
2009	Crush	Her	Segment: "Oshchushchat"
2009	Oxygen	Sasza	
2009	3 Seasons in Hell	Jana	Nominated — Czech Lion Award for Best Actress in Leading Role
2010	Trick	Elżbieta	
2010	Mistyfikacja	Zuzanna Zarotyńska	
2012	Tanets Deli	Katarzyna	
2012	Viva Belarus!	Viera	
2013	Ivan syn Amira	Maria 'Masza'	
2014	All About My Parents	Karolina	Nominated — Polish Academy Award for Best Supporting Actress
2016	Marie Curie: The Courage of Knowledge	Marie Curie	Nominated — Polish Academy Award for Best Actress
2016	Szczescie swiata	Róza	
2017	The Art of Loving: The Story of Michalina Wislocka	Karolina	
2017	Lullaby Killer	Anna	Nominated — Polish Academy Award for Best Supporting Actress
2020	Gullregn	Daniela	
2020	Speedway	Mother of Roma	
2021	Miasto	Teresa Pelka	
2021	Death of Zygielboym	Ewa Zemler	
2022	Too Old for Fairy Tales	Teresa Banaś	
2022	Detective Bruno	Hanna	
2023	Joika	Valeriya Lebedev	
2023	The Breach	Janina Tomska	
2023	Kaytek the Wizard	Mother of Zosia	
2024	Too Old for Fairy Tales 2	Teresa Banaś	
2025	Detective Bruno. Baltic Gold	Hanna	
2025	Operation Pope	Marysia 'Bianka'	
2025	Chopin, a Sonata in Paris	Delfina Potocka	Nominated — Polish Academy Award for Best Supporting Actress
2026	Too Old for Fairy Tales 3	Teresa Banaś	
2026	The Doll	Florentyna	

=== Television ===
Year	Title	Role	Notes
1998	Boża podszewka	Gienia Lulewicz	6 episodes
2001	Sposób na Alcybiadesa	Ola	Miniseries
2002	The Hexer	Morénn	Episode: "Czlowiek - pierwsze spotkanie"
2002	Sfora	Joanna „Nika” Różycka	8 episodes
2003	Przedwiośnie	Wanda	2 episodes
2005	Oficer	Malwina Wielgosz	7 episodes
2005-2006	Boża podszewka 2	Gienia Lulewicz	16 episodes
2007	Milosc w przejsciu podziemnym	Skrzypaczka	Television film
2007	Falszerze. Powrót sfory	Joanna Różycka Nika	13 episodes
2007	Na puti k serdtsu	Emilia	10 episodes
2007	Tajemnica twierdzy szyfrów	Natalia Russt	13 episodes
2008	Résolution 819	Klara Gorska	Television film
2010	Days of Honor	Inga Neuman	7 episodes
2016	The Red Band Society	Asia	12 episodes
2017	The Optimists	Gabi Goetze	3 episodes
2018	Moscow Noir	Olga Ukolova	8 episodes
2020	Kod genetyczny	Izabela Berger	8 episodes
2020	Królestwo kobiet	Olga Maj	8 episodes
2022	Nieobecni	Suzana	7 episodes
2023	Dom pod Dwoma Orlami	Zofia Szablewska	9 episodes
2024	Gra z Cieniem	Nina Nielsen	10 episodes
2025	The Breslau Murders	Dr. Inga Eissmann	Disney+ series
2025	Pati	Alina Malec	6 episodes
2026	Anesthesia	Basia	Netflix series
