= Inheritance (2024 Polish film) =

2024 film by Sylwester Jakimow

- Polish Netflix poster
- Polish: Spadek
- Directed by: Sylwester Jakimow
- Written by: Łukasz Sychowicz
- Produced by: Jerzy Dzięgielewski; Paweł Heba; Maciej Sojka; Roman Szczepanik
- Starring: Maciej Stuhr; Gabriela Muskała; Joanna Trzepiecińska; Piotr Pacek; Mateusz Król; Piotr Polak; Jan Peszek; Adam Ferency; Franciszek Słomiński; Józefina Karnkowska
- Cinematography: Malte Rosenfeld
- Edited by: Marceli Majer
- Music by: Aleksander Pankowski Vel Jankowski
- Production company: Orphan Studio
- Distributed by: Netflix
- Release date: 19 June 2024
- Running time: 94 minutes
- Country: Poland
- Language: Polish

Inheritance (Polish: Spadek) is a 2024 Polish black comedy film directed by Sylwester Jakimow. It was released on Netflix on 19 June 2024.

== Premise ==
After the death of an eccentric inventor, his dysfunctional family gathers to try and inherit his estate, only to find out that he has prepared a final game to determine the beneficiary of the inheritance.

== Cast ==
- Maciej Stuhr as Dawid Kłos
- Gabriela Muskała as Zofia Kłos
- Joanna Trzepiecińska as Natalia
- Piotr Pacek as Gustaw
- Mateusz Król as Karol 1
- Piotr Polak as Karol 2
- Jan Peszek as Władysław Fortuna
- Adam Ferency as Władysław's butler
- Franciszek Słomiński as Henryk Kłos
- Józefina Karnkowska as Józefina Kłos
- Piotr Żurawski as a policeman
- Albert Osik as a policeman
- Mikołaj Chroboczek as the cashier
- Rafał Zawierucha as Officer Trzeciak
- Jolanta Banak as Katarzyna
- Łukasz Sychowicz as the priest

== Release ==
It was released on Netflix on 19 June 2024.

== Reception ==
Andrzej Kulasek of Gazeta Wyborcza wrote, "Spadek starts off very promisingly, but then gets lost somewhere in the genre meanders, leaving the impression of a promise unfortunately unfulfilled."

Dominik Jedliński of Onet Kultura wrote, "Spadek is neither funny nor decently conducted - the story has gaps and is not engaging, the script is a mess, there are bizarre dialogues and stale jokes, and the characters lack depth."

Joanna Twaróg of Glamour Polska wrote, "Spadek disappoints on several levels. Compared to other productions of this genre (such as the Knives Out series), the story is highly predictable. There are gaps in it. And although it leads to a rather surprising ending, the way in which the mystery is solved leaves much to be desired."
