= All About My Parents =

Comedy drama film directed by Marcin Krzysztalowicz

- Theatrical release poster
- Directed by: Marcin Krzysztalowicz
- Written by: Marcin Krzysztalowicz
- Produced by: Krzysztof Gredzinski; Malgorzata Jurczak
- Starring: Łukasz Simlat; Agata Kulesza; Adam Woronowicz; Karolina Gruszka
- Edited by: Wojciech Mrówczynski
- Production companies: Non Stop Film Service; Krakowskie Biuro Festiwalowe; Polish Film Institute
- Distributed by: Kino Świat (Poland)
- Release date: December 25, 2014
- Running time: 90 minutes
- Country: Poland
- Language: Polish

All About My Parents (Polish: Pani z przedszkola) is a 2014 Polish comedy drama film written and directed by Marcin Krzysztalowicz. The film stars Łukasz Simlat, Agata Kulesza, Adam Woronowicz and Karolina Gruszka. It follows a 40 year-old man who works with a therapist and go through his childhood memories about his parents' sex life and their lives during the 1970s in Polish People's Republic. It was released on December 25, 2014, by Kino Świat in Poland.

At the 2015 Polish Film Awards, All About My Parents received three nominations: for Best Actress (Kulesza), Best Supporting Actor (Woronowicz) and Best Supporting Actress (Gruszka).

== Cast ==
- Łukasz Simlat as Krzysztof Myśliwski (40 years-old)
- Agata Kulesza as Mother
- Adam Woronowicz as Father
- Karolina Gruszka as Pani Karolina
- Krystyna Janda as Grandmother
- Marian Dziędziel as Therapist
- Cezary Morawski as narrator
