= Tomasz Wasilewski =

Polish film director

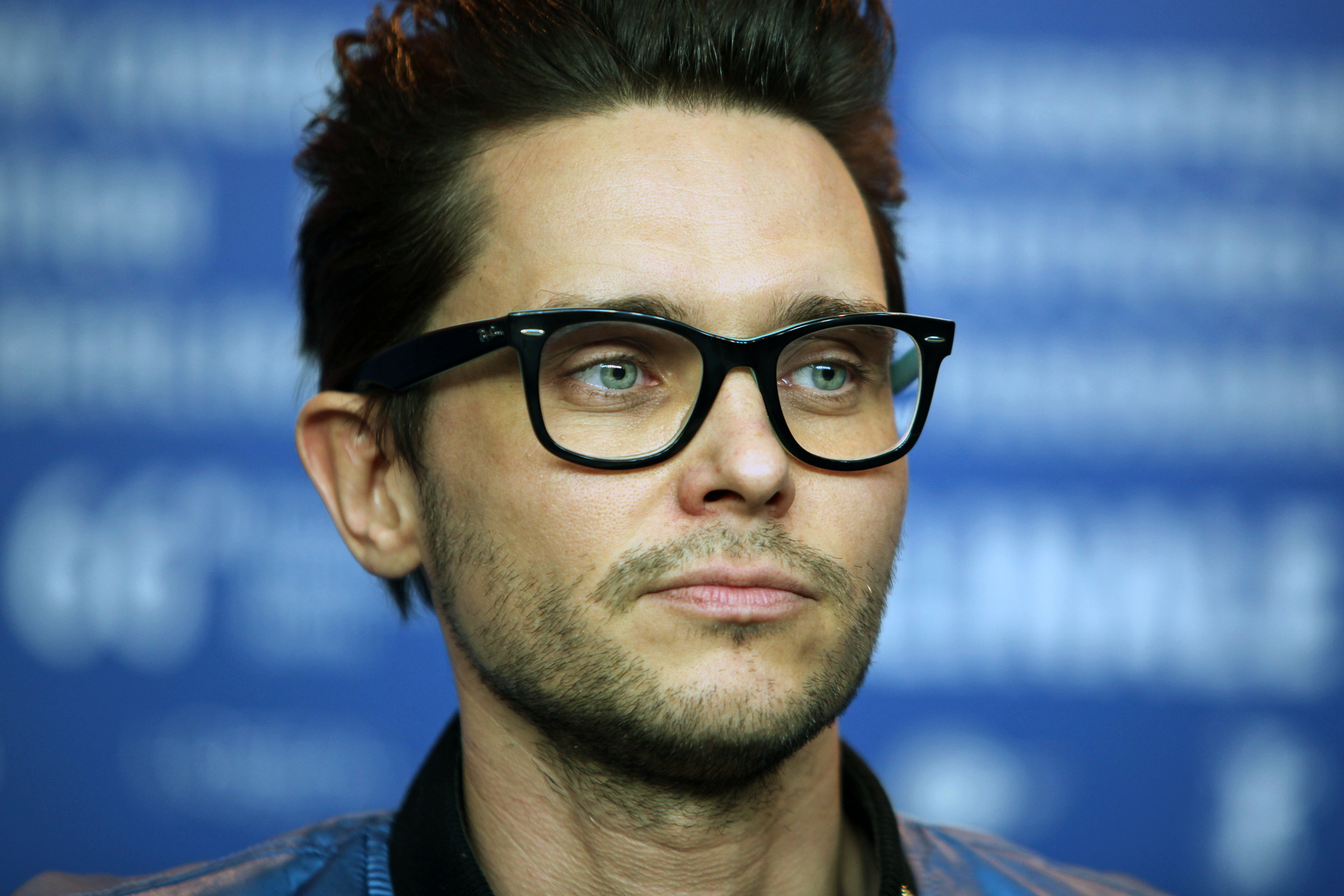
- Tomasz Wasilewski in 2016
- Born: 26 September 1980 (age 45); Toruń, Poland
- Occupations: Director, screenwriter
- Years active: 2008-present

Tomasz Wasilewski (born 26 September 1980) is a Polish film director and screenwriter. His 2016 film United States of Love was shown at the 66th Berlin International Film Festival where he won the Silver Bear for Best Script.

== Filmography ==
- Show Jednego Czlowieka (2008) documentary short
- W sypialni (2012)
- Floating Skyscrapers (2013)
- United States of Love (2016)
