= Oxygen (2009 film) =

- Russian: Кислород
- Directed by: Ivan Vyrypaev
- Written by: Ivan Vyrypaev
- Produced by: Vadim Goryainov; Ekaterina Kononenko; Leonid Lebedev; Valery Todorovsky
- Starring: Aleksey Filimonov; Karolina Gruszka; Varvara Voetskova
- Cinematography: Andrey Naydenov
- Edited by: Pavel Khanyutin
- Music by: Aidar Gainullin; Oleg Kostrov; Vitaliy Lapin; Andrey Samsonov
- Release date: 2009
- Country: Russia
- Language: Russian

Oxygen (Russian: Кислород) is a 2009 Russian musical drama film directed by Ivan Vyrypaev.

== Plot ==
The film tells about a young guy Sasha, who walks along the boulevard. Around him are different people who are busy with their own affairs. And suddenly he saw a beautiful red-haired girl who became pure oxygen for him, without which he can no longer live.

== Cast ==
- Aleksey Filimonov
- Karolina Gruszka
- Varvara Voetskova
