= These Daughters of Mine =

- Film poster
- Directed by: Kinga Dębska
- Starring: Agata Kulesza; Gabriela Muskała
- Release date: 17 September 2015 (GFF)
- Running time: 88 minutes
- Country: Poland
- Language: Polish
- Box office: $ 3 097 650

These Daughters of Mine (Polish: Moje córki krowy) is a 2015 Polish comedy film directed by Kinga Dębska. The film was screened at Gdynia Film Festival in 2015 where it won both Audience and Journalist Awards. The same year, the film also became a recipient of Audience Award at the Ann Arbor Film Festival, and in 2016, was awarded with an Eagle Award from Polish Film Awards.

== Plot ==
Marta, star of popular series, is 42 years old, she is strong and dominant. Despite fame and money, he still can't shape her life. Emotionally unstable 40-year-old Kasia is stuck in a far-fetched marriage, raising a teenage son. The sisters are not very fond of each other, they completely do not understand and do not even try to understand their life choices. Illness and, consequently, the loss of one parent force them to act together. Women gradually approach each other, regain lost contact, which provokes several tragicomic situations.

== Cast ==
- Agata Kulesza as Marta
- Gabriela Muskała as Kasia
- Marcin Dorociński as Grzegorz
- Marian Dziędziel as Father
- Małgorzata Niemirska as Mother
- Łukasz Simlat as Piotr
- Barbara Kurzaj as Iza
- Jeremi Protas as Filip
- Maria Debska as Zuzia
