= Too Old for Fairy Tales =

2022 Polish film by Kristoffer Rus

- Polish theatrical release poster
- Polish: Za duży na bajki
- Directed by: Kristoffer Rus
- Written by: Agnieszka Dąbrowska
- Based on: Za duży na bajki by Agnieszka Dąbrowska
- Produced by: Mikołaj Pokromski
- Starring: Maciej Karaś; Dorota Kolak; Karolina Gruszka; Andrzej Grabowski; Patryk Siemek; Amelia Fijałkowska
- Cinematography: Jan Rus Słomiński
- Edited by: Marcin Konarzewski
- Music by: Karim Martusewicz
- Production company: Pokromski Studio
- Distributed by: Next Film; Netflix
- Release dates: 18 March 2022 (Poland); 18 July 2022 (Netflix)
- Running time: 106 minutes
- Country: Poland
- Language: Polish

Too Old for Fairy Tales (Polish: Za duży na bajki) is a 2022 Polish coming of age comedy film directed by Kristoffer Rus, based on the novel Za duży na bajki by Agnieszka Dąbrowska. The film follows Waldek (Maciej Karaś) a young esports player who is forced to rethink his priorities when his mother's eccentric aunt arrives.

Too Old for Fairy Tales was released theatrically in Poland on 18 March 2022 before being released internationally on Netflix on 18 July 2022. A sequel, Too Old for Fairy Tales 2, was released theatrically in Poland on 15 March 2024.

== Plot ==
Waldek is a 10-year-old obese boy from Grochów who is obsessed with video games and dreams of one day becoming a professional esports player. He competes in multiple tournaments with his team "Three Kings" which consists of his two friends Staszek and Rudy. Waldek's overprotective mother Teresa supports his hobby.

One day, Teresa's eccentric aunt Mariola comes to visit. Waldek sees her as "mentally unstable," and he gets more annoyed when she stays over while Teresa goes to an appointment at the hospital. During the day, Mariola forces Waldek to ride his bike, wash the dishes, and cook his own food, which causes him to doze off while playing on the computer with his friends.

Waldek gets annoyed by Mariola's antics and he decides to sneak off to the hospital at night to visit Teresa, but he becomes distraught after finding out her condition. Later, Waldek and Staszek search for a new team member after Rudy had quit the team to join a more professional one. At a local swimming pool, Waldek runs into a girl named Delfina, and develops feelings for her. Staszek is dissatisfied with Delfina, but after finding out she is also an esports player, he decides to let her join the team.

Mariola takes Delfina and the two boys on a day trip, where Waldek tries to confess his feelings to Delfina, but she rejects this and leaves, thanks to Staszek having a crush on her. Back at home, Waldek crumbles up her application paper to join the team and throws it into the bin in frustration. After visiting his grandfather's house, Waldek's relationship with Staszek falters and he decides to take a break from video games, doing multiple activities and chores with Mariola instead.

Staszek then arrives the next day to apologise for his bad decisions and helps him out, and they both slowly reconcile. Waldek also discovers that Teresa's condition has improved, and Mariola has turned in Delfina's application. Waldek renames the team "Queen and Kings" and they are invited to play a big esports tournament in Cologne. At the airport, Teresa and Mariola watch happily as Waldek, Staszek, and Delfina board the plane for Germany.

== Cast ==
- Maciej Karaś as Waldek Banaś, a 10-year-old obese boy who is obsessed with video games
- Dorota Kolak as Aunt Mariola, Teresa's eccentric aunt
- Karolina Gruszka as Teresa Banaś, Waldek's overprotective mother
- Andrzej Grabowski as Waldek's grandfather
- Patryk Siemek as Staszek Lebioda, Waldek's best friend
- Amelia Fijałkowska as Delfina Rogalska, Waldek's love interest

== Production ==
The film was shot in Warsaw and Chrzanów Mały, with specific locations including Grochów, Mokotów, the Stadion Narodowy, and the Poniatowski Bridge. Filming was completed by October 2021.

== Release ==
Too Old for Fairy Tales was released theatrically in Poland on 18 March 2022 before being released on Netflix internationally a few months later on 18 July 2022. A sequel was then released titled Too Old for Fairy Tales 2 to Polish cinemas on 15 March 2024, later streaming on Netflix on 1 June 2024.
