= Agata Kulesza =

Polish actress (born 1971)

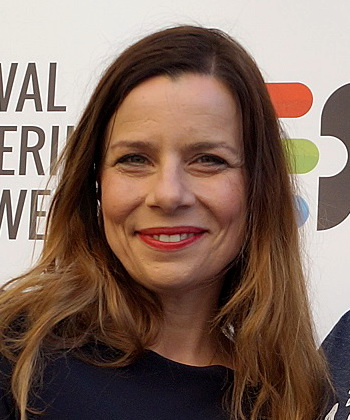
- Kulesza in 2018
- Born: 27 September 1971 (age 55); Szczecin, Poland
- Education: National Academy of Dramatic Art
- Occupation: actress
- Years active: 1992–present
- Spouse: Marcin Figurski (2006-2020)
- Children: 1

Agata Kulesza (born 27 September 1971) is a Polish actress who has appeared on film, television, and stage. She made her film debut playing the leading role in the 1993 comedy-drama Czlowiek z... and later appeared in films Poznań '56 (1996), The Spring to Come (2001), Moje pieczone kurczaki (2002), Expecting Love (2008) and Suicide Room (2011), for which she received Złota Kaczka Award for Best Actress.

In 2011, Kulesza starred in the war drama film Rose, receiving her first Polish Academy Award for Best Actress. In 2013 she starred in the drama film Ida, for which she received positive reviews from critics and Los Angeles Film Critics Association Award for Best Supporting Actress, Polish Film Festival for Best Actress, Chlotrudis Award for Best Supporting Actress and her second Polish Academy Award for Best Actress, as well nomination for National Society of Film Critics Award for Best Supporting Actress and European Film Award for Best Actress. She later appeared in films such as These Daughters of Mine (2015), The Innocents (2016), I'm a Killer (2016), Cold War (2018), The Hater (2020), Never Gonna Snow Again (2020), 25 Years of Innocence (2020), The Wedding (2021), Green Border (2023), Simona Kossak (2024), The Partisan (2025) and Home Sweet Home (2025).

Kulesza has won four Polish Film Awards and received total 13 nominations; three for her leading roles in the films Rose (2011), Ida (2013), and 25 Years of Innocence (2020); and for her supporting role in I'm a Killer (2016). In 2014 she received Order of Polonia Restituta. Kulesza is a member of the Polish Film Academy.

== Early life ==
Kulesza was born on 27 September 1971 and raised in Szczecin, West Pomeranian Voivodeship, the daughter of a sailor. While she was in high school, she decided she wanted to be an actress; in 1994, she graduated from the Aleksander Zelwerowicz National Academy of Dramatic Art in Warsaw.

== Career ==
=== 1993—2010: Beginnings ===
Following her graduation, Kulesza worked as an actress at the Teatr Dramatyczny in Warsaw. She made her television debut appearing in an episode of comedy series, Żegnaj, Rockefeller in 1993 and later guest-starred in German television series Die Straßen von Berlin and Liebling Kreuzberg. She made her big screen debut playing the leading role in the Polish comedy-drama film Człowiek z... directed by Konrad Szołajski. The following years, Kulesza played many supporting roles on film and television, such as Poznań '56 (1996) and The Spring to Come (2001), and performed in theatre productions. Her break came in 2002 with the leading role in the drama film Moje pieczone kurczaki directed by Iwona Siekierzynska, for which she received Prowincjonalia Film Festival Award in Koszalin.

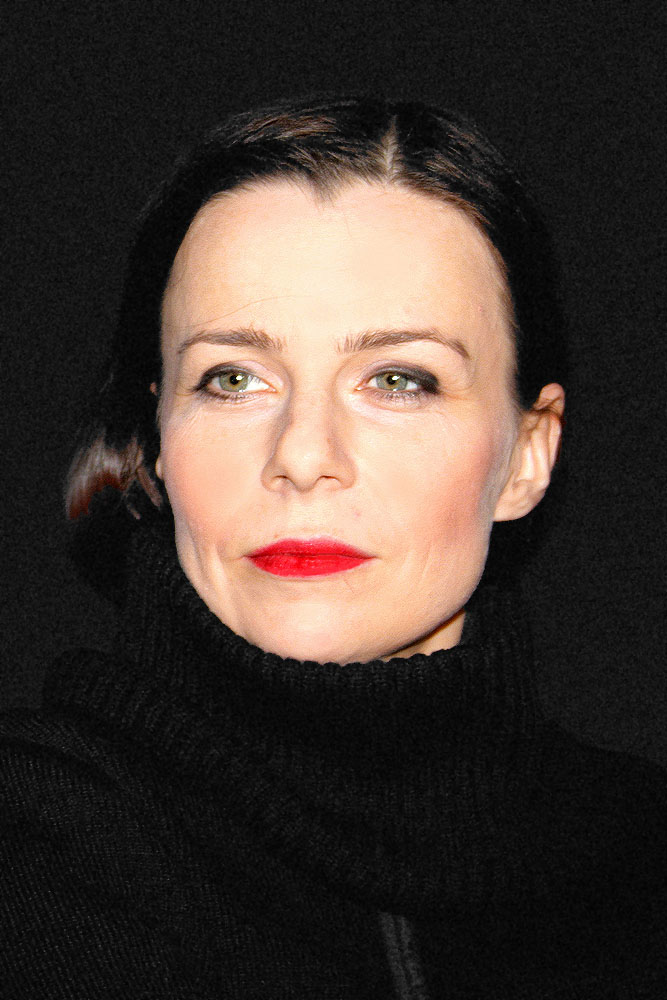
Kulesza in 2007

During the 2000s, Kulesza played many supporting roles in film and worked as voice over actor in more than 20 animated features. On television, Kulesza starred alongside Magdalena Walach and Marzena Trybała in the Polsat drama series, Pensjonat Pod Róza (2004—2006) about three women in small hotel. From 2006 to 2007 she starred in the Hela w opalach, a Polish remake of American sitcom Grace Under Fire. In 2008 Kulesza, alongside her professional partner Stefano Terrazzino, won the eighth series of Dancing with the Stars: Taniec z gwiazdami. She donated her winnings, a Porsche car, to an auction to benefit the Great Orchestra of Christmas Charity. In 2009 she starred in the short-lived sitcom Synowie and in 2011 was a regular cast member in the telenovela Prosto w serce, a remake of Argentine series, You Are the One. Since 2011, she has regularly performed at the Ateneum Theatre, also in Warsaw.

=== 2011—2014: Breakthrough ===
In 2011, Kulesza was seen in three drama films: Ki by Leszek Dawid, Suicide Room by Jan Komasa playing the mother of lead character, and Rose by Wojciech Smarzowski, playing the titular character. Suicide Room premiered at the 62nd Berlin International Film Festival and received positive reviews from critics while Kulesza's performance was noted. Meanwhile, Rose premiered at Warsaw Film Festival and won Grand Prix and later won seven Polish Film Awards. For her performance in Rose, Kulesza received positive reviews from film critics, and was listed as one of the best in 2011 by Culture.pl. Kulesza won her first Polish Academy Award for Best Actress for her role Róża, a Masurian widow who falls in love a Home Army soldier. That same year, she was given a special award from the Ministry of Culture and National Heritage recognising her acting career, as well as the Złota Kaczka awarded by Film magazine.

In 2013, Kulesza starred in the period drama film, Ida directed by Paweł Pawlikowski. Playing Wanda Gruz, a Communist resistance fighter turned state prosecutor, Kulesza received widespread acclaim. David Denby from The New Yorker noted that "Wanda tells her of her past in brief fragments, and Kulesza does more with those fragments—adding a gesture, a pause—than anyone since Greta Garbo, who always implied much more than she said." Dana Stevens wrote that "As played, stupendously, by the veteran Polish TV, stage, and film actress Agata Kulesza, Wanda is a vortex of a character, as fascinating to spend time with as she is bottomlessly sad." Jose Solis from PopMatters named her Best Supporting Actress writing: "Kulesza also allows her character’s flaws to show in heartbreaking ways, especially when we least expect it to. Watch the way she reacts to Trzebuchowska’s subtle horror upon realizing her parents, fate, it’s a moment where we see the actress hold back out of what we will come to understand as love, or at least the only kind of love she knows how to provide. Where Ida could’ve simply been a film about the effects of WWII in Poland, the characters at its center make it so much more than that, and Kulesza in particular will prove to haunt you for weeks after you’ve seen the film." Ida won the 2015 Academy Award for Best Foreign Language Film, becoming the first Polish film to do so. It had been selected as Best Film of 2014 by the European Film Academy and as Best Film Not in the English Language of 2014 by the British Academy of Film and Television Arts. Kulesza was awarded the Best Actress prize at the 38th Gdynia Film Festival, and won her second Polish Academy Award for Best Actress. Kulesza also went on to be nominated for the Paszport Polityki. Internationally, Kulesza won the Los Angeles Film Critics Association Award for Best Supporting Actress, Chlotrudis Award for Best Supporting Actress, and received nomination for National Society of Film Critics Award for Best Supporting Actress and European Film Award for Best Actress. In 2014, Kulesza received Order of Polonia Restituta and Gloria Artis Medal for Merit to Culture.

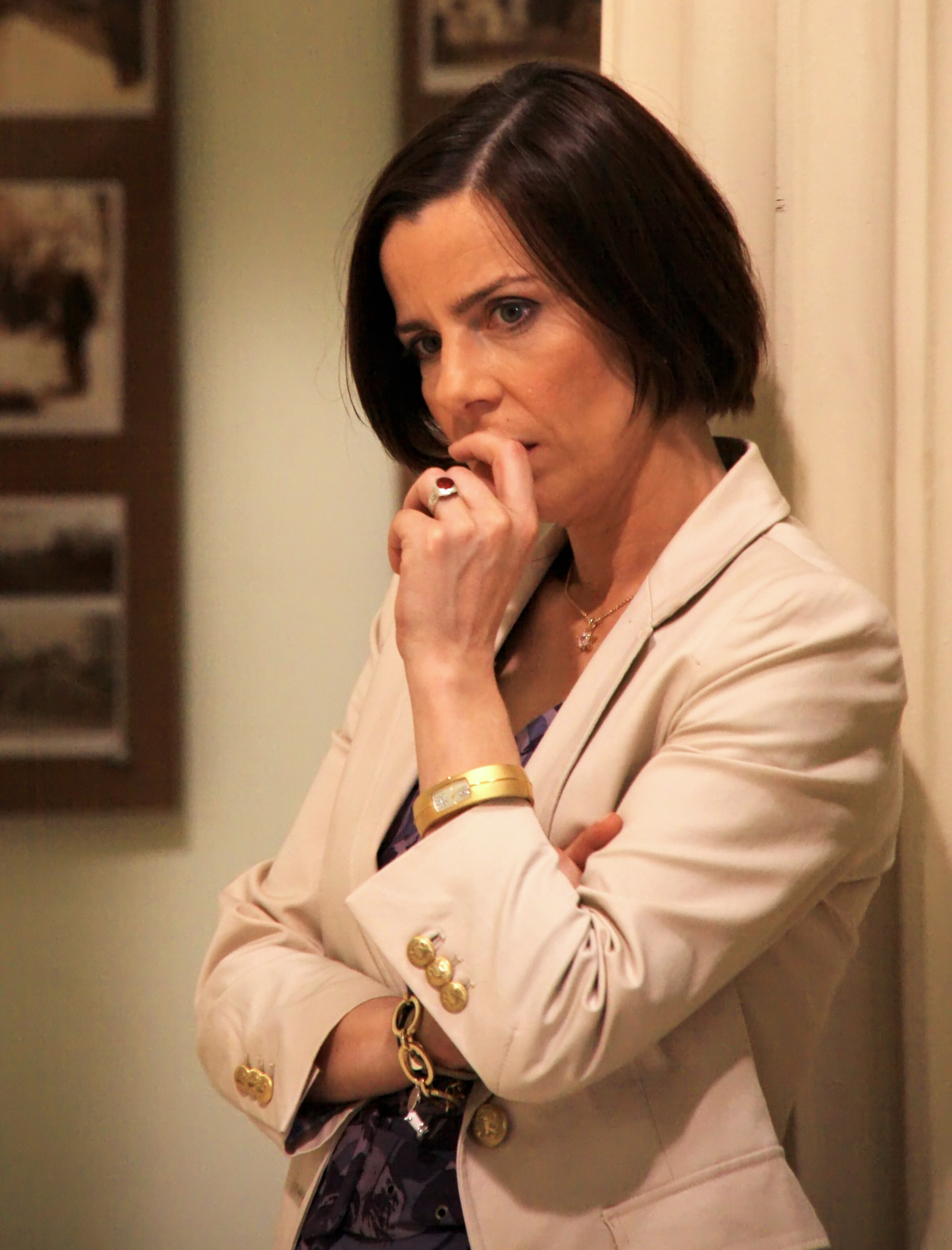
Kulesza in 2010

After her breakthrough, Kulesza began appearing in various feature films and television productions. She co-starred opposite Bartłomiej Topa in the crime drama film Traffic Department (2013), the romantic comedy Wszystkie kobiety Mateusza (2013), the period LGBT-romantic thriller In Hiding (2013), the drama The Mighty Angel (2014), the action thriller Secret Wars (2014) and the comedy film All About My Parents, for which she received another Polish Academy Award nomination for Best Actress. On television, Kulesza starred in the TVP2 comedy series, Family.pl (2011–2020). From 2012 to 2015 she played the leading role in the Canal+ crime drama series, Blood for the Blood receiving positive reviews for her performance.

=== 2015—present: Continued screen work ===
In 2015, Kulesza starred in the comedy-drama film, These Daughters of Mine, for which she received another Polish Academy Award nomination for Best Actress. In 2015 she starred in the Polish version of Showtime comedy series, Web Therapy. In 2016, Zwierciadło magazine awarded Kulesza their Crystal Mirror award for "acting of the highest quality". That year, she turned down an offer to play Beata in the political satire series The Chairman's Ear. Also in 2016, Kulesza starred in four movies: the critically acclaimed drama The Innocents, the crime drama Dark Crimes opposite Jim Carrey, the crime drama I'm a Killer about serial killer Zdzisław Marchwicki, and the comedy-drama Joy in the World. In The Innocents directed by Anne Fontaine, Kulesza played Mother Superior, the film premiered at the Sundance Film Festival with positive reception. She received positive reviews for her performance. Film critic Stephen Holden from The New York Times wrote: "The most complicated and compelling character is the severe Mother Abbess, who faces an excruciating choice between saving a baby’s life and risking disgrace, or abandoning the infant. Ms. Kulesza’s anguished performance conveys the weight of an almost unbearable choice, which she believes condemns her to eternal damnation." In Dark Crimes directed by Alexandros Avranas, Kulesza made her American film debut. Despite some praise for the cast, critics panned Dark Crimes for its pacing, overly downcast tone, and objectionable presentation of abused women. It is one of the worst-reviewed films of 2018, holding a 0% approval rating on Rotten Tomatoes. In I'm a Killer, Kulesza played the unfaithful wife of main character, for this role she learnt Silesian language. For this performance she received her first Polish Academy Award for Best Supporting Actress.

In 2017, Kulesza starred in the drama film Once Upon a Time in November directed by Andrzej Jakimowski playing the homeless mother who with her adult son are evicted from their flat and struggle to find safe place in a homeless shelter. The following year, Kulesza starred in the historical drama film, Cold War directed by Paweł Pawlikowski. The film premiered at the 2018 Cannes Film Festival received numerous accolades, including three nominations at the 91st Academy Awards, and four at the 72nd BAFTA Film Awards, as well as six awards from seven nominations at the 31st European Film Awards, winning the main Best Film Award. Kulesza was nominated for Polish Academy Award for Best Supporting Actress for her performance. The same year she played the lead in the drama film Playing Hard playing the 40-year-old prosecutor Dorota, with alcohol addiction. The performance gained her another Polish Academy Award nomination for Best Actress. From 2017 to 2019 she starred in the AXN crime drama series, Ultraviolet. From 2018 to 2019 she starred in the TVN crime thriller series, The Trap. In 2019, she appeared in the BBC One war drama, World on Fire.

In 2020, Kulesza starred in five movies: the social thriller The Hater directed by Jan Komasa, the comedy-drama Never Gonna Snow Again by Małgorzata Szumowska and Michał Englert, the crime Western Magnesium by Maciej Bochniak, the dance drama Parquet by Aleksandr Mindadze, and the prison drama 25 Years of Innocence by Jan Holoubek. The Hater premiered at the Tribeca Film Festival in the International Narrative Competition and won Best International Narrative Feature award. The film received positive reviews from critics, while Kulesza was nominated for Polish Academy Award for Best Supporting Actress. In Never Gonna Snow Again she played wealthy drug-taking widow, for which she received another Polish Academy Award nomination for Best Actress. In 25 Years of Innocence, Kulesza played the mother of falsely accused for rape and was imprisoned for 25 years, receiving positive reviews for her role. Screendaily critic Tim Grierson wrote in his review: "Avoiding emotional fireworks, Kulesza subtly communicates Teresa’s beaten-down resilience — she conveys how much the son’s imprisonment has taken out of Teresa through quiet, unimaginable weariness." At the 2021 Polish Film Awards, she received award for Best Actress.

In 2021, Kulesza starred in the dark comedy film, The Wedding directed by Wojciech Smarzowski. The performance gained her another Polish Academy Award nomination for Best Supporting Actress. Later in 2021, Kulesza began starring in the Player.pl crime drama series, The Convict playing the role of Judge Alicja Mazur who accused of a murder she did not commit. The series ended in 2024, after four seasons. In 2023 she appeared in the drama film, Green Border directed by Agnieszka Holland. The film competed for the Golden Lion at the 80th Venice International Film Festival, where it won the Special Jury Prize. In 2024 she returned to stage starring in the play Mother.

In 2024, Kulesza starred in three movies, the family drama Where Do We Begin, the biographical drama Simona Kossak, and the spy-thriller The Partisan. She starred in the social drama The Good House directed by Wojciech Smarzowski set for 2025 release. Kulesza also set to star in the Disney+ period crime drama series, Breslau. Later in 2024, Kulesza was cast opposite Joanna Kulig as Dr. Bożena Hager-Małecka in the Netflix miniseries, Lead Children about 1974 lead poisoning epidemic in Poland. In 2025 she was cast opposite Bartosz Bielenia in the dystopian romantic drama film The Time That Never Came. Later in 2025 she was cast as Pani Meliton in the film adaptation of the Bolesław Prus' novel, The Doll.

== Personal life ==
Between 2006 and 2020, Kulesza was married to cameraman Marcin Figurski, having met him in 1996; they had a daughter, Marianna, in 1997. It was reported in the Polish press that Figurski had been domestically abusive towards Kulesza.

Kulesza has been friends with musician Kasia Nosowska since childhood, with them both growing up in Sczczecin. As of 2016, she lives in Warsaw.

== Recognition ==
In addition to winning four Polish Film Awards, Kulesza has also been recognised with several governmental awards for her acting career.

- Order of Polonia Restituta (2014)
- Silver Medal for Merit to Culture – Gloria Artis (2014)

== Filmography ==
+Key	†	Denotes works that have not yet been released

=== Film ===
Year	Title	Role	Notes
1993	Człowiek z...	Anna	
1996	Poznań '56	Teacher Zoska	
2001	The Spring to Come	Woman	
2002	Moje pieczone kurczaki	Agata	
2003	Siedem przystanków na drodze do raju	Deaf woman	
2004	Cudownie ocalony	Prisoner Czarna	
2004	Park tysiąca westchnień	Painter	
2005	Fortuna czyha w lesie	Lawyer	
2005	Solidarnosc, Solidarnosc...	Filip's Wife	Segment "Petrol"
2006	Co słonko widziało	Team Manager	
2006	Fundacja	Anka Malecka	
2007	Kilka prostych słów	Krystyna	Short; Ourense Independent Film Festival Best Actress Award
2008	Expecting Love	Doctor	
2009	Zamiana	Miecia	
2010	Flying Pigs	Karina Klaus	
2011	Ki	Miriam	
2011	Rose	Róza Kwiatkowska	Polish Academy Award for Best Actress; Gdynia Film Festival Award for Best Actress; Złota Kaczka Golden Duck Award for Best Actress; Film Magazine Award for Best Actress
2011	Suicide Room	Beata Santorska	Złota Kaczka Award for Best Actress; Gdynia Film Festival Award
2012	Miłość	Mayor's Wife	
2012	Dzień Kobiet	Psychologist	
2013	Traffic Department	Jadzia	
2013	Ida	Wanda Gruz	Gdynia Film Festival Award for Best Actress; Gijón International Film Festival Award for Best Actress; Los Angeles Film Critics Association Award for Best Supporting Actress; Minsk International Film Festival, Award for Best Actress; Polish Academy Award for Best Actress; RiverRun International Film Festival, Jury Prive for Best Actress; Złota Kaczka Award for Best Actress; Nominated—Chicago Film Critics Association Award for Best Supporting Actress; Nominated—European Film Award for Best Actress; Nominated—London Film Critics Circle Award for Supporting Actress of the Year; Nominated—Online Film Critics Society Award for Best Supporting Actress; Nominated—San Francisco Film Critics Circle Award for Best Supporting Actress; Nominated—Seattle International Film Festival Award for Best Actress; Warsaw Jewish Film Festival, best actress
2013	In Hiding	Wanda	
2013	Desire for Beauty	Herself	
2013	Wszystkie kobiety Mateusza	Maciejka	
2014	The Mighty Angel	Jerzy's Mum	
2014	Secret Wars	Dr. Anna Czerwonko	
2014	All About My Parents	Krzysztof's mother	Nominated — Polish Academy Award for Best Actress
2015	Warsaw by Night	Ola	
2015	These Daughters of Mine	Marta	Nominated — Polish Academy Award for Best Actress
2016	The Innocents	Mother Abbess	
2016	Dark Crimes	Marta	
2016	I'm a Killer	Lidia Kalicka	Polish Academy Award for Best Supporting Actress
2016	Joy in the World	Gertruda	
2017	Once Upon a Time in November	Mother	
2018	Cold War	Irena	Nominated — Polish Academy Award for Best Supporting Actress
2018	Playing Hard	Dorota	International Festival of Independent Cinema Off Camera Award for Best Performance; Nominated — Polish Academy Award for Best Actress
2020	The Hater	Beata Santorska	Nominated — Polish Academy Award for Best Supporting Actress
2020	Never Gonna Snow Again	Ewa	Nominated — Polish Academy Award for Best Actress; Nominated — Chlotrudis Award for Best Performance by an Ensemble Cast
2020	Magnesium	Stanislawa Kochaj	
2020	25 Years of Innocence	Teresa	Polish Academy Award for Best Actress
2020	Parquet	Elisabeth	
2021	The Wedding	Ela Wilk	Nominated — Polish Academy Award for Best Supporting Actress
2023	Green Border	Basia	
2024	Simona Kossak	Elżbieta Kossak	Nominated — Polish Academy Award for Best Supporting Actress
2024	Where Do We Begin	The Mother	
2024	The Partisan	Stefania Skarbek	
2025	Home Sweet Home	Jolka	Nominated — Polish Academy Award for Best Supporting Actress
2026	The Time That Never Came †	Sara	Post-production
2026	The Doll †	Pani Melton	Post-production

=== Television ===
Year	Title	Role	Notes
1993	Żegnaj, Rockefeller	Operator	2 episodes
1995	Die Straßen von Berlin	Katharina Stefanescu	Episode: Babuschka
1997	Liebling Kreuzberg		Episode: "Schmerzensgeld"
1998—1999	Zlotopolscy	Dilajla	9 episodes
1999	The Clan	Clerk	3 episodes
2000	Na dobre i na złe	Maria Kozluk	Episode: "Zagubione dziecko"
2004—2006	Pensjonat Pod Róza	Danuta 'Dusia' Adamska	Series regular, 112 episodes
2006	Niania	Actress	Episode: Rabnieta owca
2006—2007	Hela w opalach	Edyta Swoboda	Series regular, 41 episodes
2005, 2008	Off the Stretcher	Blanka Matoga	2 episodes
2009	Synowie	Lucyna Dobrowolska	Series regular, 13 episodes
2009	39 and a Half	Hania	Episode: Rola zycia
2010	Father Matthew	Renata Szulc	Episode: Talent
2011	Prosto w serce	Aneta Sienkiewicz	Series regular, 195 episodes
2011—2020	Family.pl	Maria	Series regular, 147 episodes
2012	True Law	Krystyna Sikorska	Episode: Episode #1.5
2012—2015	Krew z krwi	Carmen Rota	Series regular, 18 episodes
2015	Web Therapy	Dr. Lucyna Kole-Bojarska	Series regular, 10 episodes
2019	World on Fire	Maria Tomaszeski	2 episodes
2018—2019	The Trap	Olga Sawicka	Series regular, 13 episodes
2017—2019	Ultraviolet	Anna Serafin	Series regular, 22 episodes
2021—2024	The Convict	Judge Alicja Mazur	Lead role, 27 episodes
2023	My Agent	Herself	1 episode
2023	Pati	Judge Alicja Mazur	1 episode
2023	The Teacher	Roztocka the pathologist	3 episodes
2025	The Breslau Murders	Gerda Holtz	Series regular, 8 episodes
2026	Lead Children	Professor Krystyna Berger	Netflix miniseries
