= Eliza Rycembel =

Polish actress (born 1992)

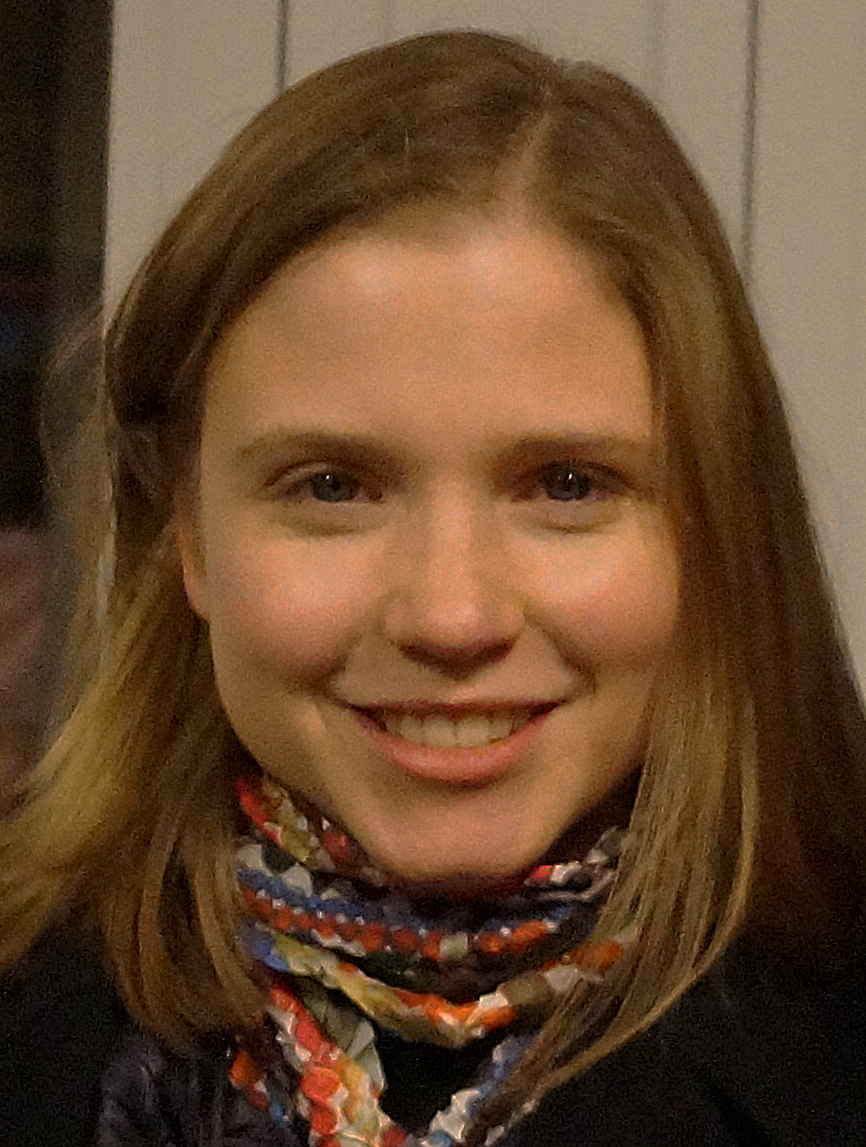
- Born: 1992 (age 33–34); Warsaw, Poland
- Occupation: Actress

Eliza Rycembel (born 1992) is a Polish actress.

She was the winner of the Polish Academy Award for Best Supporting Actress at the 44th Polish Film Festival for the film Corpus Christi.

== Biography ==
From the age of six, Eliza Rycembel studied ballet at the Hanna Kamińska Dance and Acting Studio at the General Ballet School.

== Filmography ==
- 2014 Obietnica as Lila Śliwińska
- 2015 Carte Blanche as Klara
- 2016 Wszystko gra as Zosia / Great-Grandmother
- 2018 Nina as Magda
- 2019 Piłsudski as Wanda Juszczekiczówna, daughter of Maria Piłsudska
- 2019 Ciemno, prawie noc as Ewa At Age 17
- 2019 Corpus Christi as Marta
- 2023 Irena's Vow as Ida
- 2024 Comme Des Cowboys as Stacey

== Awards ==
- 2014: Award for the best actress at the International Film Festival for Children and Youth in Vienna for her role in the film Obietnica
- 2019: Distinction at the Tarnów Film Award for her role in the film Nina
