= Magnesium (film) =

- Directed by: Maciej Bochniak
- Written by: Maciej Bochniak
- Starring: Dawid Ogrodnik; Mateusz Kościukiewicz; Maja Ostaszewska; Borys Szyc; Malgorzata Gorol; Andrzej Chyra; Magdalena Boczarska; Bartosz Bielenia; Piotr Głowacki; Agata Kulesza
- Edited by: Jacek Drosio
- Distributed by: Kino Świat
- Release date: October 2, 2020
- Running time: 116 minutes
- Country: Poland
- Language: Polish

Magnesium (Polish: Magnezja) is a 2020 Polish Western crime comedy drama film written and directed by Maciej Bochniak. It stars Dawid Ogrodnik, Mateusz Kościukiewicz, Maja Ostaszewska and Agata Kulesza. The film premiered at the 2020 Polish Film Festival and won four awards. It was released by Kino Świat on June 11, 2021. At the 24th Polish Film Awards, Magnesium won two awards for Best Makeup and Hairstyling and Best Costume Design.

== Plot ==
Set in the 1920s in the borderland between Poland's Galicia and the USSR, Róza Lewenfisz (Maja Ostaszewska) take over the head position on her Jewish mafia family's, while twin brothers (Dawid Ogrodnik, Mateusz Kościukiewicz) from USSR plan to rob her family. Meanwhile, inspector Stanislawa Kochaj (Agata Kulesza) comes to town.

== Cast ==
- Dawid Ogrodnik as Albert Hudini
- Mateusz Kościukiewicz as Albin Hudini
- Maja Ostaszewska as Róza Lewenfisz
- Borys Szyc as Zbroja Lewenfisz
- Malgorzata Gorol as Lila Lewenfisz
- Andrzej Chyra as Lew Alinczuk
- Magdalena Boczarska as Helena
- Bartosz Bielenia as Erwin
- Piotr Głowacki as Priest
- Agata Kulesza as Stanislawa Kochaj
