= Heart of Love (film) =

- Film poster
- Directed by: Łukasz Ronduda
- Written by: Robert Bolesto
- Produced by: Łukasz Gutt
- Starring: Justyna Wasilewska, Jacek Poniedziałek, Magdalena Cielecka
- Cinematography: Łukasz Gutt
- Edited by: Przemysław Chruścielewski
- Music by: Wojciech Bąkowski
- Distributed by: Gutek Film
- Release date: 1 December 2017 (Poland)
- Running time: 78 minutes
- Country: Poland
- Language: Polish

Heart of Love (Polish: Serce miłości) is a 2017 Polish drama film directed by Łukasz Ronduda.

== Plot ==
The film is set in twenty-first century Poland. The film's protagonist, Zuzanna Bartoszek, played by Justyna Wasilewska experiences an affair with a narcissist. Both as artists, experiment with love and emotion, exploring sexual dominance along with their artistic ventures.

== Cast ==
- Justyna Wasilewska as Zuzanna Bartoszek
- Jacek Poniedziałek as Wojciech Bąkowski
- Magdalena Cielecka as the curator
- Patryk Pniewski as Zuzanna's friend
