= Courage (2011 film) =

- Film poster
- Polish: Wymyk
- Directed by: Greg Zglinski
- Starring: Robert Więckiewicz; Łukasz Simlat
- Release date: 8 June 2011 (GFF)
- Running time: 85 minutes
- Country: Poland
- Language: Polish

Courage (Polish: Wymyk) is a 2011 Polish action film directed by Greg Zglinski.

The film was shot in Łódź from July to August 26, 2010.

== Plot ==
Alfred and Jerzy take part in a brutal incident: during a train ride, a couple of hooligans harass a young woman. Jerzy stands in her defense. Alfred hesitates and becomes a helpless bystander as his younger brother is thrown off the moving train. 'Courage' is about people whose lives get disturbed by a violent act, which forces them to reveal who they really are.

== Cast ==
- Robert Więckiewicz as Alfred Firlej
- Łukasz Simlat as Jerzy Firlej
- Gabriela Muskała as Viola Firlej
- Marian Dziędziel as Stefan Firlej
- Anna Tomaszewska as Anna Firlej
