= Dorota Kolak =

Polish actress (born 1957)

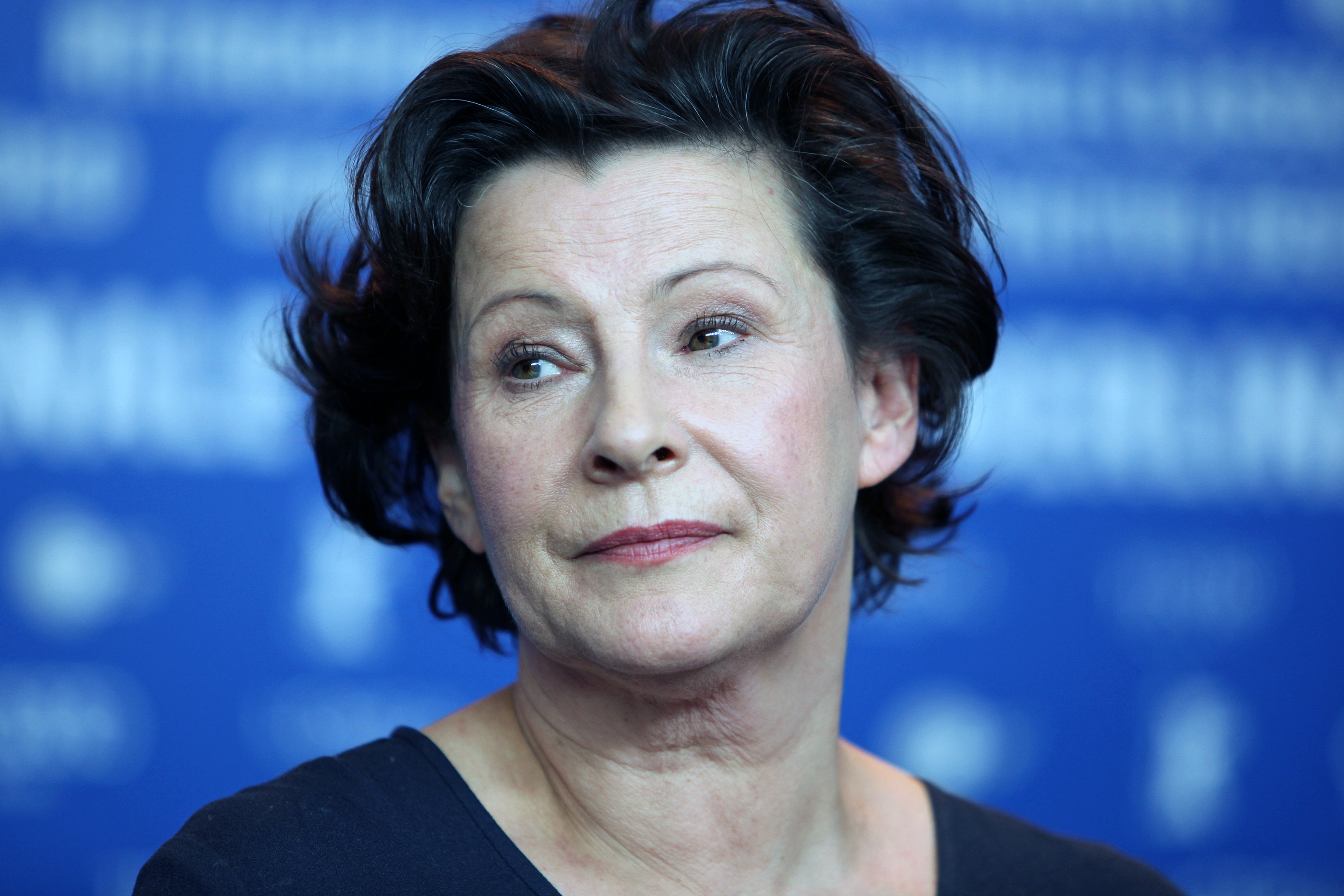
- Kolak at the 66th Berlin International Film Festival in 2016
- Born: 20 June 1957 (age 68); Kraków, Poland
- Occupation: Actress
- Years active: 1979–present
- Spouse: Igor Michalski

Dorota Kolak (born 20 June 1957) is a Polish actress and professor. She received two Gdynia Film Festival Award for Best Supporting Actress for I Am Yours (2009) and United States of Love (2016), and two Polish Academy Award for Best Actress nominations for performances in United States of Love (2016) and Playing Hard (2018).

== Life and career ==
Kolak was born and raised in Kraków, Poland. She graduated from the AST National Academy of Theatre Arts in Kraków in 1980 and later began perform in various stage productions. She also worked as an acting teacher. In 2015 she received a master's degree at the Łódź Film School.

In 1996, Kolak received Meritorious Activist of Culture and the Cross of Merit. In 2008 she received Silver Gloria Artis Medal for Merit to Culture from Ministry of Culture and National Heritage, Tomasz Merta. In 2024, Kolak received Golden Medal.

Kolak has appeared in more than 70 movies and television series during her career. On television, she starred in Radio Romans (1994–95), Pensjonat Pod Róza (2004–06), Recipe For Life (2011–13) and Barwy szczęścia (2007–18). She made her big screen debut in 1998 and later played number of supporting roles in various movies. She received two Gdynia Film Festival Award for Best Supporting Actress for I Am Yours (2009) and United States of Love (2016). For United States of Love, Kolak also received her first Polish Academy Award for Best Actress nomination. She received her second Polish Academy Award nomination for Best Actress for Playing Hard (2018).

Kolak starred in the 2020 Netflix miniseries The Woods. She also starred in Netflix films The Getaway King (2021) and Too Old for Fairy Tales (2022). In 2023, she was cast in the Polsat comedy series, Servant of the People.

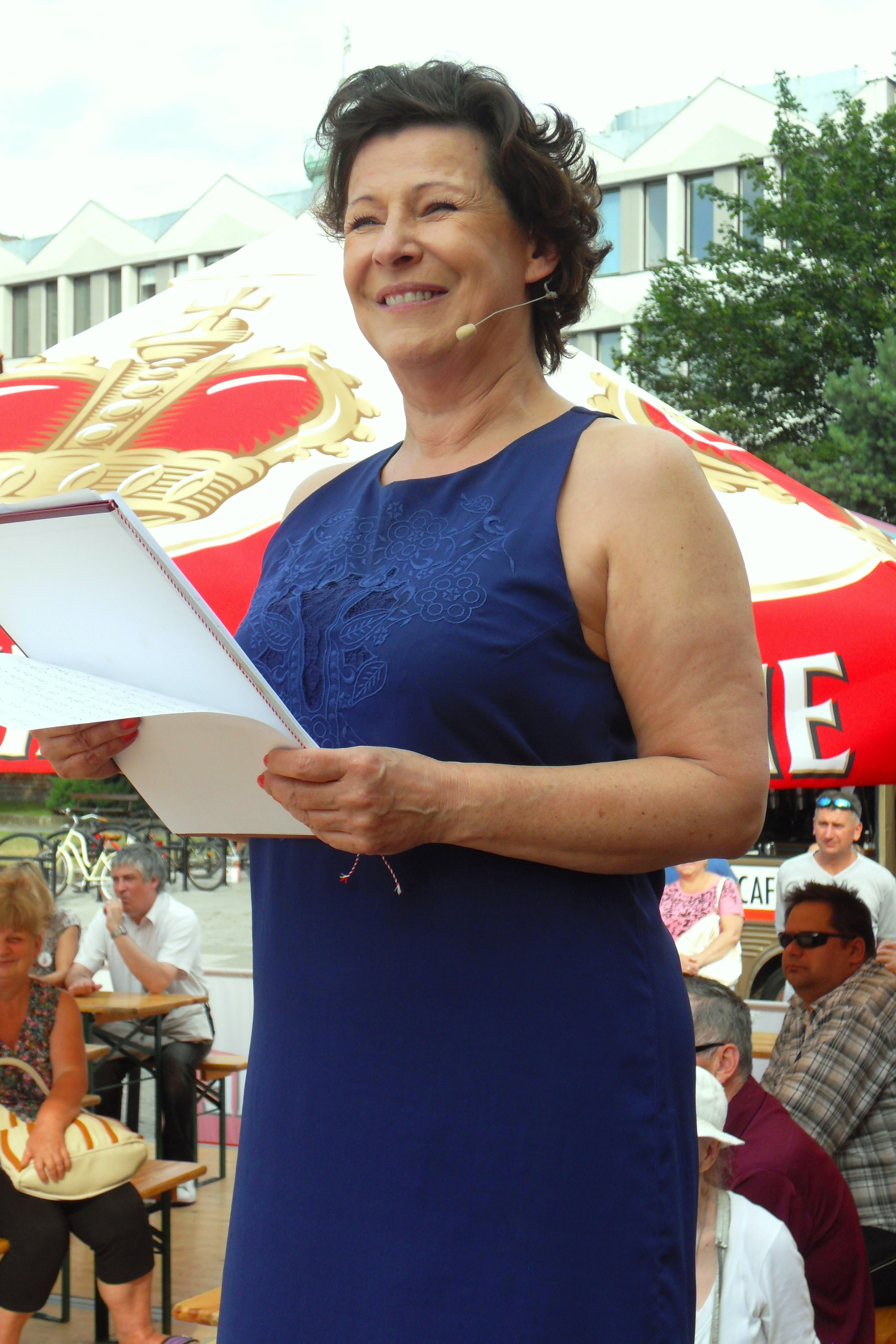
Kolak in 2014

== Selected filmography ==
- Vinci (2004)
- Strike (2006)
- I Am Yours (2009)
- Fear of Falling (2011)
- Life Feels Good (2013)
- United States of Love (2016)
- Afterimage (2016)
- Konwój (2017)
- Playing Hard (2018)
- The Getaway King (2021)
- Too Old for Fairy Tales (2022)
- Delivery by Christmas (2022)
- I Believe in Santa (2023)
