= Łukasz Ronduda =

Film director, screenwriter, art historian and curator (born 1976)

- Born: 1976 (age 49–50)
- Occupations: Film director, screenwriter, art historian, art curator

Łukasz Ronduda (born 1976) is a film director, screenwriter, art historian and curator.

== Biography ==
In 2019 he curated Polish pavilion at the 58th Venice Biennale. He took a job as a curator at the Museum of Modern Art in Warsaw. He became a member of the European Film Academy.

== Filmography ==
Source.

- Performer (2015)
- Heart of Love (2017)
- All Our Fears (2021)
- Lot (2022), documentary film
- Rave (2024), documentary film
- Powiedz mi, co czujesz (2026)
- Freak show (2026), documentary film
