= The Partisan (film) =

2024 film by James Marquand

- Polish theatrical release poster
- Directed by: James Marquand
- Written by: James Marquand
- Produced by: Robert Chadaj; Krystian Kozlowski; Mathew Whyte
- Starring: Morgane Polanski; Frederick Schmidt; Agata Kulesza; Ingvar Sigurdsson; Malcolm McDowell
- Cinematography: Karol Lakomiec
- Edited by: Przemyslaw Chruscielewski
- Production companies: Sisyphus Sp; FDR Studio; Polish Film Institute; Signature Entertainment
- Distributed by: Media Squad Distribution (Poland); High Fliers Films (United Kingdom)
- Release dates: 27 September 2024 (Gdynia Polish Film Festival); 3 October 2025 (United Kingdom and Poland)
- Running time: 108 minutes
- Countries: Poland; France; United Kingdom
- Language: English
- Budget: £7.5 million

The Partisan, released as Skarbek in Poland, is a 2024 biographical spy thriller film directed and written by James Marquand. The film stars Morgane Polanski as Krystyna Skarbek, a Polish agent of the British Special Operations Executive during the Second World War. Also starring are Frederick Schmidt, Agata Kulesza, Ingvar Sigurdsson and Malcolm McDowell. It premiered at the Gdynia Polish Film Festival on 27 September 2024, and was released by Signature Entertainment in the United Kingdom, and by Brainstorm Media in the US.

== Cast ==
- Morgane Polanski as Krystyna Skarbek
- Frederick Schmidt as Roger
- Agata Kulesza as Stefania Skarbek
- Ingvar Sigurdsson as Armand
- Malcolm McDowell as Trench coat
- Piotr Adamczyk as Captain Hamann
- Grégoire Colin as Dubois
- Steven Waddington
- Lech Dyblik
- Piotr Trojan as Feliks
- Jacek Beler
- Andrew Schofield as La Fouine
- Dorota Landowska as Madame Auphan

== Production ==
Filming began in October 2022 in Warsaw. Morgane Polanski, Frederick Schmidt, Agata Kulesza, Ingvar Sigurdsson and Malcolm McDowell were cast in main roles and the £7.5 million project was supported by Polish Film Institute and Ministry of Culture and National Heritage. Some scenes were filmed in France, Lublin, and the Tatra Mountains, and completed in late May 2023 in Bystrzyca Kłodzka and Stołowe Mountains. In May 2023, it was reported that Signature Entertainment had acquired the rights to release the film in the United Kingdom.

== Release ==
The film was released in Poland on 3 October 2025, by Media Squad Distribution, as well as the United Kingdom by High Fliers Films.
