= Marie Curie: The Courage of Knowledge =

2016 film by Marie Noëlle

Marie Curie
- Film poster
- Directed by: Marie Noëlle
- Written by: Marie Noëlle; Andrea Stoll
- Starring: Karolina Gruszka; Arieh Worthalter; Charles Berling
- Cinematography: Michał Englert
- Edited by: Lenka Fillnerova; Hans Horn; Marie Noëlle; Isabelle Rathery
- Music by: Bruno Coulais
- Release date: 9 September 2016 (TIFF)
- Running time: 100 minutes
- Country: Poland
- Language: French
- Box office: $1.9 million

Marie Curie: The Courage of Knowledge (Polish: Maria Skłodowska-Curie; French and German title: Marie Curie) is a 2016 internationally co-produced drama film directed by Marie Noëlle. It was screened in the Contemporary World Cinema section at the 2016 Toronto International Film Festival. It made its United States premiere at the New York Jewish Film Festival in 2017.

== Plot ==
The film shows the life of Marie Curie from 1904 to 1911. Together with her husband Pierre Curie, she researches the isolation of the element radium, which they had discovered, and which leads to the first attempts to use radioactivity in cancer therapy. However, shortly after her second child is born, Pierre dies in a tragic accident with a horse wagon. Despite her great sadness, Curie continues her research and takes over her husband's lectures at the University of Paris. At the first Solvay conference, where she is the only woman, she meets Albert Einstein, who makes her laugh with his charm.

Returning to Paris, she runs for a place in the French Academy of Sciences, which until now has only consisted of men: those who still do not want to admit female members narrowly prevail in the election. She then begins an affair with her friend and scientist Paul Langevin; when his wife informs the press, Curie is publicly slandered. The Nobel Committee awards her the 1911 Nobel Prize in Chemistry, her second one after the Physics Prize in 1903. When they found out about the scandal, the Swedish ambassador tries to persuade her to voluntarily renounce, but she refuses and travels anyways to Stockholm to give the acceptance speech.

== Cast ==
- Karolina Gruszka as Marie Curie, a physicist
- Arieh Worthalter as Paul Langevin, her collaborator and lover
- Charles Berling as Pierre Curie, Marie's husband and co-researcher
- Izabela Kuna as Bronia, Marie's sister
- Malik Zidi as André Debierne, a chemist
- André Wilms as Eugène Curie, Pierre's father
- Daniel Olbrychski as Emile Amagat, a physicist
- Marie Denarnaud as Jeanne Langevin, Paul's wife
- Samuel Finzi as Gustave Téry, a journalist
- Piotr Głowacki as Albert Einstein, a physicist
- Jan Frycz as Ernest Solvay
- Sabin Tambrea as August Gyldenstople
- Sasha Crapanzano as Irène Curie (9 years old)
- Rose Montron as Irène Curie (15 years old)
- Adele Schmitt as Ève Curie (7 years old)

== Reception ==
=== Box office ===
Marie Curie: The Courage of Knowledge grossed $127,993 in the United States and Canada, and $1.8 million in other territories for a worldwide total of $1.9 million.

=== Critical response ===
On review aggregator Rotten Tomatoes, the film has an approval rating of 65%, based on 26 reviews, with an average rating of 5.30/10. The website's critics consensus reads, "Marie Curie: The Courage of Knowledge may test the patience of some viewers with its deliberate pacing, but this sensitively made biopic has its well-acted rewards". On Metacritic, the film has a weighted average score of 49 out of 100, based on 6 critics, indicating "mixed or average reviews".
