= Keep Away from the Window =

2000 Polish drama film

- Directed by: Jan Jakub Kolski
- Written by: Hanna Krall; Cezary Harasimowicz
- Produced by: Witold Adamek
- Starring: Dorota Landowska
- Cinematography: Arkadiusz Tomiak
- Release date: 17 November 2000
- Running time: 104 minutes
- Country: Poland
- Language: Polish

Keep Away from the Window (Polish: Daleko od okna) is a 2000 Polish drama film directed by Jan Jakub Kolski about a young couple who conceal a Jewish woman in their house during World War II. It was entered into the 23rd Moscow International Film Festival.

== Cast ==
- Dorota Landowska as Barbara
- Dominika Ostałowska as Regina Lilienstern
- Bartosz Opania as Jan
- Krzysztof Pieczynski as Jodla
- Karolina Gruszka as Adult Helusia
- Dariusz Toczek as Marek
- Adam Kamien as Dolke
- Magdalena Mirek as Jodla's wife
- Olgierd Łukaszewicz as Regina's messenger #1
- Grzegorz Damięcki as Regina's messenger #2
