= Corpus Christi (2019 film) =

2019 film by Jan Komasa

- Polish theatrical release poster
- Polish: Boże Ciało
- Directed by: Jan Komasa
- Written by: Mateusz Pacewicz
- Produced by: Leszek Bodzak; Aneta Cebula-Hickinbotham
- Starring: Bartosz Bielenia; Aleksandra Konieczna; Eliza Rycembel; Tomasz Ziętek; Leszek Lichota; Łukasz Simlat
- Cinematography: Piotr Sobociński Jr.
- Edited by: Przemyslaw Chruscielewski
- Music by: Evgueni Galperine; Sacha Galperine
- Production companies: Aurum Film; Canal+ Polska; WFS Walter Film Studio; Podkarpacki Regionalny Fundusz Filmowy; Les Contes Modernes
- Distributed by: Kino Świat (Poland)
- Release dates: 2 September 2019 (Venice); 11 October 2019 (Poland)
- Running time: 116 minutes
- Countries: Poland; France
- Language: Polish
- Budget: $1.3 million
- Box office: $10.9 million

Corpus Christi (Polish: Boże Ciało) is a 2019 drama film directed by Jan Komasa and written by Mateusz Pacewicz. An international co-production between Poland and France, the film stars Bartosz Bielenia, Aleksandra Konieczna, Eliza Rycembel, Tomasz Ziętek, Leszek Lichota, and Łukasz Simlat. Inspired by real-life events, it follows a 20-year-old man who experiences a spiritual transformation while living in a youth detention center.

The film had its world premiere at the 76th Venice International Film Festival on 2 September 2019, and was theatrically released in Poland on 11 October 2019, by Kino Świat. It received generally positive reviews from critics and was a box office success, grossing over $10.9 million worldwide against a $1.3 million budget. At the 22nd Polish Film Awards, it earned a leading fifteen nominations and won in eleven categories, including Best Film. It also earned four nominations at the 33rd European Film Awards and was nominated for Best International Feature Film at the 92nd Academy Awards.

== Plot ==
Daniel, a devout Catholic serving a sentence for second-degree murder, finds his dream of becoming a priest upon release thwarted by his criminal background. Assigned to work in a sawmill in a village, he visits the local Catholic church, pretending to be a priest. The vicar of the church believes his lie and leaves him in charge while away for medical treatment.

Daniel begins performing all the duties of a priest and enjoys it. The parishioners appreciate his unorthodox methods, even when he unexpectedly confesses to being a murderer from the pulpit. However, they have mixed feelings when he starts probing a recent car accident. An adult man driving alone died in the crash, along with six teenagers in the other car. While the man was an unpopular outcast known for violent behavior, the villagers refuse to consider the possibility that the teenagers were at fault.

Daniel learns from a new friend, Marta, whose brother was one of the victims, about a video her brother sent her hours before the accident. The video shows the group, including the driver, drinking heavily and doing drugs, but she hasn't shared it. The mayor warns Daniel against further inquiry, insisting the matter is settled. The disagreement revolves around whether the driver should be buried in the village cemetery with the other victims.

Months after the accident, Daniel discovers that the cremated remains of the driver await burial. Many villagers have sent hateful, threatening letters to his widow, who has been ostracized for maintaining her husband's innocence. Daniel and a guilt-ridden Marta confront the villagers with these letters, and Daniel decides to conduct a burial service for the solo driver. Marta's mother kicks her out for revealing the letters, and she seeks refuge in the temporary rectory with Daniel, where they become intimate.

During the burial service, many villagers set aside their animosity and pay their respects. Before the planned Mass following the burial, the priest from Daniel's youth detention center arrives, having been tipped off about the impostor. He tells Daniel to leave immediately, but Daniel escapes through a window and proceeds to celebrate his "farewell Mass", revealing his tattoos before departing.

Daniel is sent back to jail, where he encounters the brother of the man he murdered. They engage in a brutal fight, and Daniel emerges victorious. The other prisoners allow him to walk free.

== Cast ==
- Bartosz Bielenia as Daniel
- Aleksandra Konieczna as Lidia the sexton
- Eliza Rycembel as Marta Sosińska
- Leszek Lichota as the Mayor
- Łukasz Simlat as Father Tomasz
- Tomasz Ziętek as Pinczer
- Barbara Kurzaj as the Widow
- Zdzisław Wardejn as Father Wojciech

== Production ==
The script for Corpus Christi was written by Mateusz Pacewicz with consultation help from Krzysztof Rak, but after director Jan Komasa read it, he felt the story and especially the character of Daniel needed to be pushed further, so he added a "troubled background" to Daniel's story. Komasa has also said that the car accident that caused such trauma for characters in the film is a symbol for the 2010 Smolensk air disaster, in which 96 people died in a plane crash, including Poland's president and a number of officials from the government.

The film was produced by Leszek Bodzak and Aneta Cebula-Hickinbotham for Aurum Film, with Canal+ Polska, WFS Walter Film Studio, Podkarpacki Regionalny Fundusz Filmowy, and Les Contes Modernes also producing. It was co-financed by Polish Film Institute and CNC Cinemas Du Monde – Institut Français. Jan Naszewski's New Europe Film Sales handled world rights.

The film's production ran into controversy because a man claimed the film was actually based on his real life experiences and his efforts to get in contact with the film's producers were met with silence. The producers have said that the film is not based on this man's life, and instead on various cases of fraud in the priesthood. Pacewicz has said that fake priests are a fairly common occurrence in Poland, and every couple months a new case is discovered; they are often "about the need for a sort of social security for the underprivileged to become a trustworthy priest which is a great form of social status for many".

Most of the filming took place in Jaśliska, south-eastern Poland. One of the scenes was filmed on a barge at Lake Rożnów in Tabaszowa.

== Release ==
Corpus Christi has its world premiere in Venice Days section of the 76th Venice International Film Festival on 2 September 2019, where it won the Edipo Re Award and the Europa Cinemas Label Award. The film made its North American premiere in the Contemporary World Cinema section of the 44th Toronto International Film Festival on 10 September 2019. It was released in Poland by Kino Świat on 11 October, and in the United Kingdom and Ireland by Vertigo Releasing on 18 October. It also screened in the World Cinema section of the 33rd AFI Fest on 20 November 2019.

As of January 2020, the film was invited to the program of 60 festivals and was sold to 45 territories. It had a limited theatrical release in the United States on 19 February 2020, before a wide release on 28 February by Film Movement.

== Reception ==
=== Critical response ===
On the review aggregator website Rotten Tomatoes, 98% of 103 critics' reviews are positive, with an average rating of 8.0/10. The website's consensus reads: "Led by an impressive performance from Bartosz Bielenia, Corpus Christi thoughtfully and engagingly examines questions of faith and redemption." Metacritic, which uses a weighted average, assigned the film a score of 77 out of 100, based on 20 critics, indicating "generally favorable" reviews.

Variety's Peter Debruge called the film "stunning" and "quietly subversive", despite a few plot points that feel like a soap-opera to him. "Bielenia is never less than totally compelling," wrote Christy Lemire for RogerEbert.com, adding that "this is a complex character full of layers and contradictions." The Washington Post's Ann Hornaday described the film as "an absorbing, spiritually attuned drama" and added that "Bielenia presents the perfect embodiment of haunted asceticism" while "Komasa's careful framing and lighting reveal him to be innocent-looking one moment and more menacing the next". Writing in the Polish magazine Polityka, Janusz Wróblewski described the film as more suspenseful than the classic Western films, and lauded the ways in which it exorcises the complexities of Poland's past.

=== Accolades ===
Corpus Christi was nominated for Best International Feature Film at the 92nd Academy Awards. It won a record eleven Polish Film Awards: Best Film, Best Director (for Jan Komasa), Best Actor (for Bartosz Bielenia), Best Actress (for Aleksandra Konieczna), Best Supporting Actor (for Łukasz Simlat), Best Supporting Actress (for Eliza Rycembel), Best Screenplay (for Mateusz Pacewicz), Best Cinematography (for Piotr Sobocinski Jr.), Best Editing (for Przemyslaw Chruscielewski), Discovery of the Year (for Pacewicz), and the Audience Award.

The film also won ten awards at the Polish Film Festival, including Best Director, Best Script, Journalists' Award and Audience Award. It won the Silver Star and Best Actor Award for Bartosz Bielenia at the El Gouna Film Festival, and a Special Mention at the Reykjavik International Film Festival. At Luxembourg's CinEast, the film won the Special Jury Prize and the Critics' Prize. Bartosz Bielenia also won the award for Best Actor at the Chicago International Film Festival and Stockholm International Film Festival. He also won the Shooting Stars Award for the most promising up-and-coming European actor.

== See also ==
- List of submissions to the 92nd Academy Awards for Best International Feature Film
- List of Polish submissions for the Academy Award for Best International Feature Film
