= Filip Bajon =

Polish director and screenwriter (born 1947)

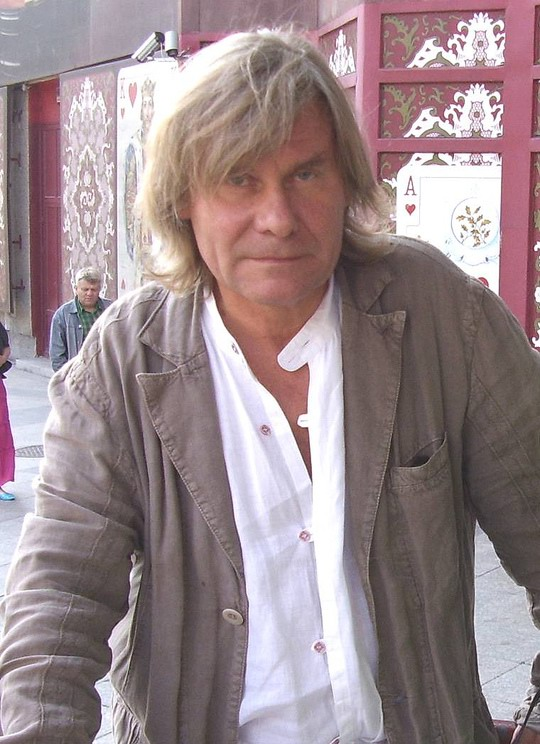
- Filip Bajon (2007)
- Born: 25 August 1947 (age 79); Poznań, Poland
- Occupation: Film director
- Children: Kasper Bajon

Filip Michał Bajon (born 25 August 1947) is a Polish film director and screenwriter. He is a lecturer at the Łódź Film School, where he was dean of the Faculty of Direction from 2008 to 2016, and father of Kasper Bajon.

== Filmography ==
Film
Year	Title	Role	Notes
1976	Powrót	Director, screenwriter	
1981	Wizja lokalna 1901	Director, screenwriter	Screened at the 1981 Directors' Fortnight of Cannes
1987	Magnat	Director, screenwriter	
1996	Poznań '56	Director, screenwriter	
