= Fugue (film) =

2018 Polish film

- Film poster
- Directed by: Agnieszka Smoczyńska
- Starring: Gabriela Muskala
- Edited by: Jarosław Kamiński
- Production company: Mental Disorder 4
- Release dates: 15 May 2018 (Cannes); 7 December 2018 (Poland)
- Running time: 100 minutes
- Country: Poland
- Language: Polish

Fugue (Polish: Fuga) is a 2018 Polish drama film directed by Agnieszka Smoczyńska. It was screened in the Critics' Week section at the 2018 Cannes Film Festival.

== Cast ==
- Gabriela Muskala as Alicja & Kinga
- Lukasz Simlat as Krzysztof
- Malgorzata Buczkowska as Ewa
- Piotr Skiba as Michał
- Halina Rasiakówna as Mother
- Zbigniew Walerys as Father

== Reception ==
In a mainly positive review for the Krakow Post Giuseppe Sedia wrote: "Smoczynska's self-sustaining talent is capable of shining with its own light even without the sequins from her daring debut effort", adding however that it "could crush the hopes of the viewers pursuing extravagance or originality at any cost".
