= United States of Love =

2016 Polish drama film

- Film poster
- Directed by: Tomasz Wasilewski
- Written by: Tomasz Wasilewski
- Starring: Julia Kijowska
- Release dates: 19 February 2016 (Berlin); 29 July 2016 (Poland)
- Running time: 104 minutes
- Country: Poland
- Language: Polish
- Box office: $184,271 (Poland)

United States of Love (Polish: Zjednoczone Stany Miłości) is a 2016 Polish drama film directed by Tomasz Wasilewski. It was selected to compete for the Golden Bear at the 66th Berlin International Film Festival. At Berlin, Wasilewski won the Silver Bear for Best Script.

== Cast ==
- Julia Kijowska as Agata
- Magdalena Cielecka as Iza
- Dorota Kolak as Renata
- Marta Nieradkiewicz as Marzena
- Andrzej Chyra as Karol

== Reception ==
=== Critical response ===
In a positive review for the Krakow Post Giuseppe Sedia commended the film for "the overwhelming use of grey in the superb cinematography by Romanian new wave hero Oleg Mutu" adding that "grey is also used to drench the stories of the four leading female roles in the monotony and dreariness of their daily life without Antonioni-esque cliches".
