= Barbara Jonak =

Polish actress (born 1975)

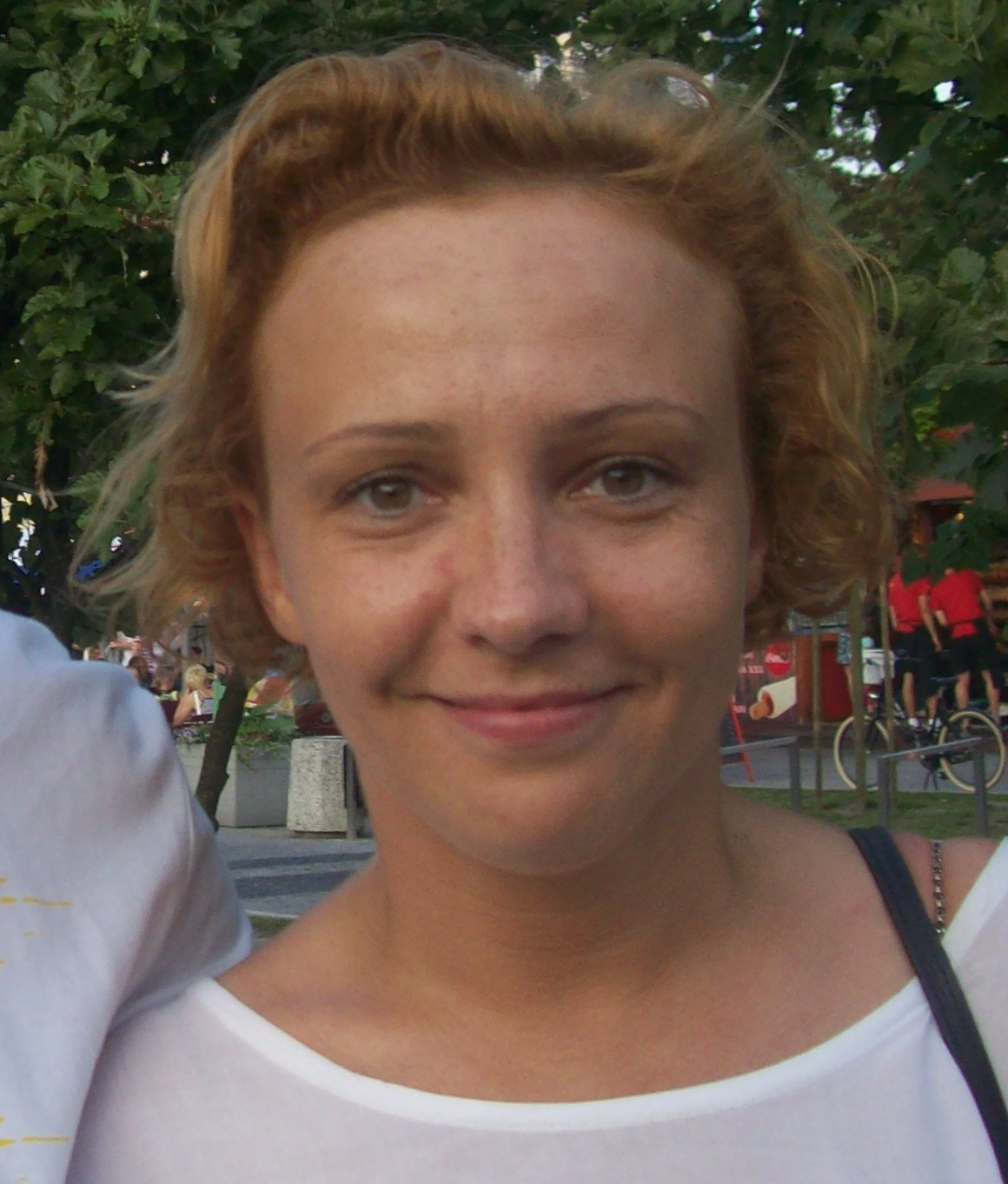
- Barbara Kurzaj in 2012
- Born: 26 December 1975 (age 50); Kraków, Poland
- Occupation: Actress
- Years active: 1994–present

Barbara Jonak, née Kurzaj (born 26 December 1975), is a Polish film, theatre and television actress.

== Life and career ==
She was born on 26 December 1975 in Kraków. In 1994, she made her debut by performing in Elias Canetti's play The Wedding staged in the Juliusz Słowacki Theatre in Kraków. In 1999, she graduated from the National Academy of Theatre Arts in Kraków. Apart from the Juliusz Słowacki Theatre, she also performed at Kraków's Old Theatre and the Silesian Theatre in Katowice.

In 2005, she was awarded the Leon Schiller Prize by the Polish Union of Stage Actors (ZASP) for her performances in Nondum and Merylin Mongoł stage plays. In 2007, she appeared in Agnieszka Holland's political drama TV series Ekipa.

Her notable film roles are featured in Kinga Dębska's 2015 comedy film These Daughters of Mine and Jan Komasa's 2019 drama film Corpus Christi.

== Appearances in film and television ==
- 1999: Tydzień z życia mężczyzny – killer
- 2000: Enduro Bojz – Ewa
- 2000–2001: Miasteczko – Ela's colleague
- 2001: Samo niebo – actress (episode 3)
- 2001: Inferno – Anka
- 2002: Wolny przejazd – Natasza
- 2003: Bez końca – girl
- 2004: W dół kolorowym wzgórzem – Zośka
- 2004: Ono – Ewa's friend
- 2004: Oficer – "doliniara" (episodes 7 and 10)
- 2005: Boża podszewka (episode 14)
- 2005: Oda do radości – Danka (part 1)
- 2006: Strajk – Elwira
- 2006: Królowie śródmieścia – Bożena's secretary (episodes 5–7)
- 2006: Na cz@tach – Monika
- 2006: Co słonko widziało – Ewa
- 2007: Katyń
- 2007: Ekipa – Patrycja
- 2008: Wichry Kołymy – prisoner
- 2008–2011: Ojciec Mateusz – Teresa (episode 1); SPA worker (episode 31); pathomorphologist (episode 93)
- 2008: Glina – Helena Kuchciak (episode 20)
- 2009: Generał – neighbour (episode 2)
- 2009: Generał – zamach na Gibraltarze – Ala
- 2009–2010: Blondynka – Viola
- 2010: Ratownicy – Julita Kędzior (episode 2)
- 2010: Milczenie jest złotem – Marysia
- 2010: Maraton tańca – sister Cezaria
- since 2010: Barwy szczęścia – Sabina Nowak-Tomala
- 2011: Ki – Iwo
- 2011–2013: Głęboka woda – Edyta Zając
- 2012: Paradoks – Grażyna (episode 4)
- 2013: Komisarz Alex – Markowska, Kaja's mother (episode 51)
- 2013: Stacja Warszawa – prosecutor
- 2015: These Daughters of Mine – Iza Kwiecień
- 2015: Czerwony pająk – prostitute
- 2016: Ojciec Mateusz – Gabriela Frączek (episode 192)
- 2016: Na dobre i na złe – Maja (episode 657)
- 2016: Bóg w Krakowie – Irena, Ola's boss
- 2017: Komisarz Alex – Natalia Rogalska (episode 116)
- 2018: Za marzenia – headmistress
- 2018: Dzień czekolady – Dawid's mother
- 2019: Szóstka – Teresa
- 2019: Corpus Christi – widow
- 2022: Hold Tight
- 2022: The Office PL

== See also ==
- Polish cinema
- Polish Film Awards
