= Łukasz Simlat =

Polish actor (born 1977)

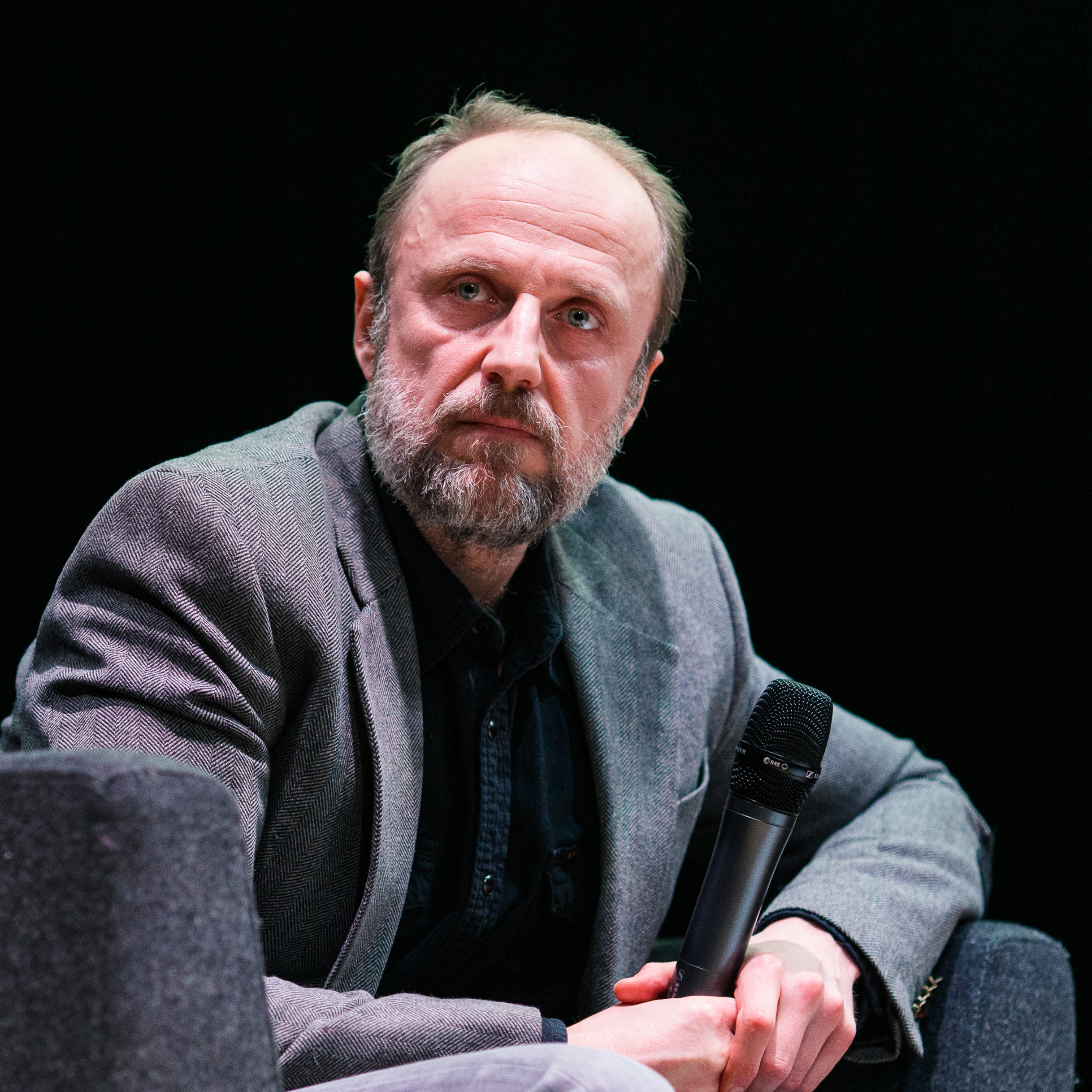
- Born: 11 December 1977 (age 48); Sosnowiec, Poland
- Occupation: Actor
- Years active: 2000-present

Łukasz Simlat (born 11 December 1977) is a Polish actor. He has appeared in more than 60 films and television shows since 2000.

== Biography ==
Graduate of the Secondary School named after Emilia Plater in Sosnowiec. For two years he attended the acting studio "Art-Play" by Dorota Pomykała and Danuta Owczarek in Katowice. In 2000, he graduated from the Theater Academy in Warsaw (without a diploma).

After graduation, he made guest appearances in several theaters without a permanent job. Since 3 December 2007 he has been a full-time actor at the Powszechny Theater in Warsaw. In 2012, thanks to Agnieszka Glińska, he became a member of the artistic team of the Studio Theater in Warsaw.

His theatrical achievements have been appreciated and awarded many times.

He is married.

== Selected filmography ==
- Vinci (2004)
- Courage (2011)
- In the Name Of (2013)
- All About My Parents (2014)
- Karbala (2015)
- Fugue (2018)
- Corpus Christi (2019)
- Never Gonna Snow Again (2020)
- Furioza (2021)
- Broad Peak (2022)
- Glitter (2022)
- Scarborn (2023)
