= TR Warszawa =

Theatre in Warsaw, Poland

- Teatr Rozmaitości w Warszawie
- Interactive map of the TR Warszawa area
- Former names: Teatr Rozmaitości (1948–49); Teatr Dzieci Warszawy; Teatr Młodej Warszawy

General information
- Status: Active
- Type: Theatre
- Location: Marszałkowska Street, Warsaw, Poland, Marszałkowska 8, Warsaw, Poland
- Coordinates: 52.2150°N 21.0212°E
- Current tenants: TR Warszawa Theatre Company
- Opened: 1945

Website
- trwarszawa.pl

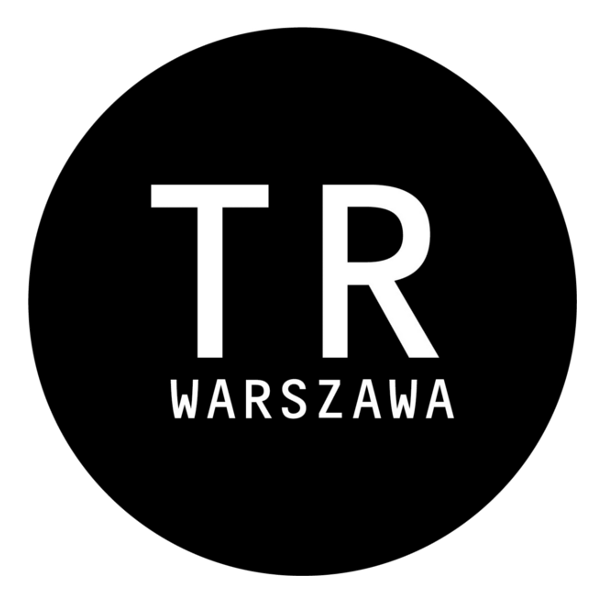
Logo of TR Warszawa

TR Warszawa (also Teatr Rozmaitości w Warszawie, transl. Variety Theatre in Warsaw) is a theatre on Marszałkowska Street in Warsaw, Poland.

== History ==
Its history began in 1945, when a stage of the Municipal Dramatic Theatres (Miejskie Teatry Dramatyczne) was opened in the basement at 8 Marszałkowska Street. TR Warszawa has existed as an independent entity since 1972. The theatre has operated under various names: Teatr Rozmaitości (1948–1949), later Teatr Dzieci Warszawy (transl. Theatre of the Children of Warsaw) then Teatr Mlodej Warszawy (transl. Theatre of Young Warsaw) and again as Teatr Rozmaitości.
