= Zdzisław Najmrodzki =

20th-century Polish criminal

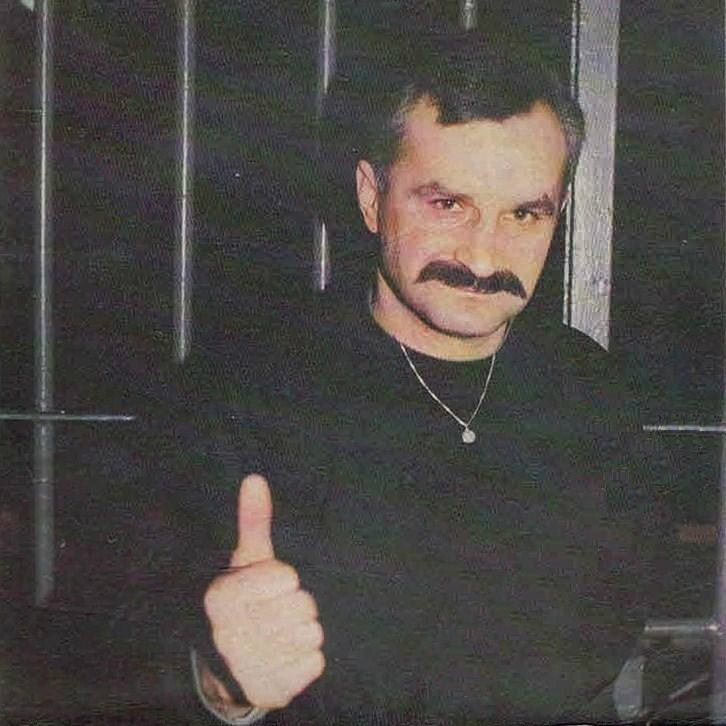
- Zdzisław Najmrodzki
- Born: Zdzisław Najmrodzki; 20 August 1954; Czermno, Poland
- Died: 31 August 1995 (aged 41) near Mława, Poland
- Other name: Saszłyk
- Occupations: auto mechanic; criminal; robber; motor vehicle thief

Details
- Span of crimes: 1974–1989
- Injured: 19 November 1989

Zdzisław Najmrodzki (Polish: [ˈzd͡ʑi.swaf najˈmrɔt͡s.ki]; 20 August 1954 – 31 August 1995) was a Polish thief active in the 1970s and the 1980s who has been described as one of the period's most famous criminals. He escaped from authorities 29 times, including escapes from a train, a courthouse window, Warsaw police headquarters, and a prison.

His criminal history included the robbery of over 70 Pewex stores of scarce luxury goods and stealing over 100 FSO Polonez cars. In total, he served 11 years in prison, and was eventually pardoned in 1994 by the president of Poland, Lech Wałęsa.

== Early life and education ==
Zdzisław Najmrodzki, one of four brothers, was born on 20 August 1954 in Czermno, Poland, to Sabina and Władysław Najmrodzki. He grew up without his father. When he was in the fifth grade of primary school, he almost drowned while swimming in the water reservoir. That experience caused him to develop life-lasting trauma, which manifested as a lisp. When his classmates picked on him due to his speech disorder, his mother decided to withdraw him from the school. He graduated from an auto mechanics vocational school. When he was 19, he was drafted into military service for two years, during which he stood out for his physical fitness. Afterward, he received an offer to join the army's special forces. He declined, as he hoped to become a rally driver. Despite that, he never applied for or obtained a driving licence. In 1975, he began work in an auto repair shop in Gliwice, and he married in 1977.

== Criminal history ==
At the age of 20, after battering a police officer in a pub near the town of Żyrardów, Najmrodzki was imprisoned in Gliwice for one and half years without the right to a suspended sentence. While in prison, he worked as a car mechanic. A few weeks later, while being transported by train with another prisoner for trial in Warsaw, he escaped. A few hours into the journey, the two police officers who were guarding the prisoners agreed to remove Najmrodzki's handcuffs and drank beer with him. After the guards had fallen asleep, Najmrodzki jumped out of a window and returned to Gliwice, where he hid at his friend's house and forced his wife to remain silent when questioned by the authorities. While at large, he committed other crimes.

Later Najmrodzki contacted a friend in the Polish military—a smuggler. They planned for Najmrodzki to distract police patrols, allowing convoys of lorries to smuggle clothing (mostly jeans) into Poland. Najmrodzki created a distraction by recklessly driving a Fiat 131 Mirafiori, thus allowing the lorries to pass unexamined. After some time, Najmrodzki organized a criminal group which he used to rob over 70 Pewex stores, which sold luxury goods and scarce products but were not equipped with security alarms. Najmrodzki developed a "poster method", in which the thieves would cut a hole in a store window to gain entry, after which one of them would cover the hole from the outside with a poster. Goods stolen from the stores were sold in the market, and Najmrodzki became a valued supplier to traders. These robberies gained media coverage across the country.

Najmrodzki rented hotel rooms in Silesia and Opolian Silesia. In the evenings, he attended parties in the best clubs, always wearing expensive suits with a gold watch and a chain around his neck. By this time, he had started using the pseudonym Szaszłyk, a Polish word meaning shashlik, which was his favorite dish, and due to a speech disorder, pronounced by him in a way that was considered amusing by others.

After Najmrodzki was arrested in 1980, his criminal associates hired the lawyer who had represented Najmrodzki when he was imprisoned following his 1974 arrest in Gliwice. This time, in the light of his previous escape, the militia officers took precautionary measures. The prisoner transport vehicle was parked in front of the building, with its back doors facing the entrance, and militiamen pushed Najmrodzki inside the building. While under arrest, Najmrodzki managed to smuggle out a letter containing the blueprints of the building, including the room in which prisoners were awaiting trial. His associates had partially sawn off the window bars, which, on 23 July 1980, allowed Najmrodzki to break them, and slide down the line outside the building and join his associate on a motorcycle.

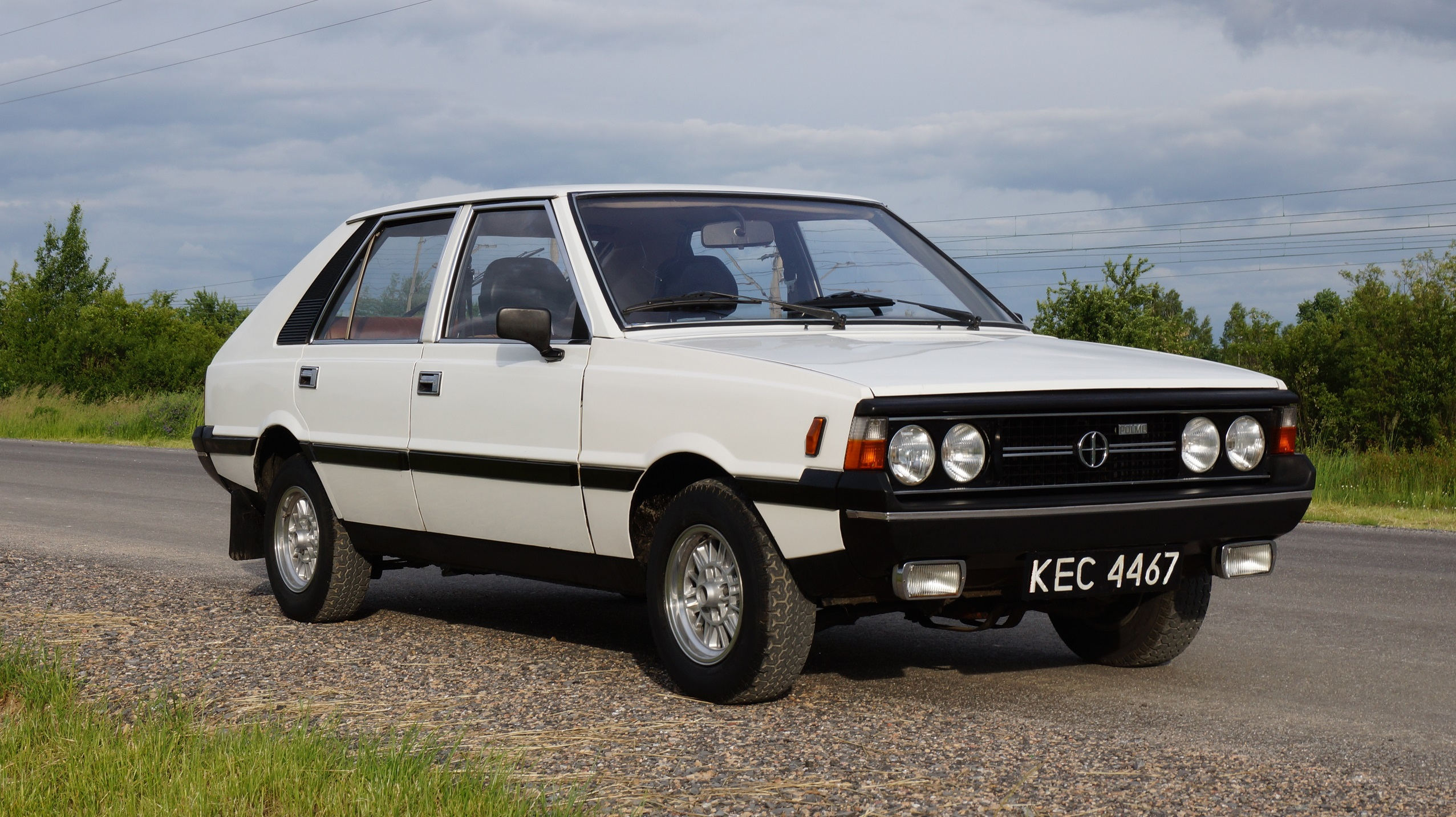
1978 FSO Polonez, the car model stolen by Najmrodzki

During the early 1980s, Najmrodzki organized a gang of car thieves. Over two years, they stole over 100 FSO Polonez cars, the only vehicle model they took. To steal a car, a thief would peel off the seals of the back window, remove the glass, and crawl inside the vehicle, to then start the car using cables. The gang members also broke into the town halls to steal blank documents and stamps that they later used to fabricate the cars' documentation. The stolen cars were usually disassembled into parts, which were then sold. Some cars were also sold at the auto auctions. While doing so, Najmrodzki had a rule that stolen vehicles should be sold only to people who "profit from the poor and weak", and focused on rich clients. The cars were always quickly sold, due to competitive prices. Efforts to stop the gang included the formation of a Civilian's Militia special group under the code name "Polonez". Najmrodzki managed to escape from the authorities several times, but eventually, on 3 March 1983, he was caught after a car chase outside Warsaw. He was imprisoned in the Mokotów Prison at Rakowiecka Street, Warsaw. On 5 February 1985, he was transported to the headquarters of the Civilians' Militia in Mostowski Palace. While being interrogated by a militia officer, Najmrodzski knocked him down using his handcuffed hands, then stole the key to the handcuffs and the ID card from the officer's pocket. He escaped the building, showing the ID card to the duty officer at the exit. The Civilians' Militia ordered an increase in the intensity of the search for Najmrodzki, making him a more wanted person than the members of the Solidarity movement. The increased intensity of the search was announced on television and in newspapers, and he was referred to as a "dangerous bandit". In his criminal activity, he focused on theft, avoiding fights, and he never killed anyone.

Najmrodzki divorced his wife and started dating a 24-year-old woman, for whom he bought a villa near Warsaw. He gained a degree of public sympathy because he was perceived as a person who stole national property, which was seen as "nobody's".

=== Later criminal career ===
Within a year of his escape, Najmrodzki was caught and imprisoned in Białołęka. On 19 November 1987, he was convicted and sentenced to 15 years imprisonment for his previous crimes by the Warsaw voivodeship court. He was incarcerated in Gliwice, where he constantly planned his escape and contacted his mother about it. Over three weeks, his mother, together with his associate, dug a tunnel under the prison, while his mother regularly contacted him, reporting the status of work on the tunnel. On 3 September 1989, after approximately three years of imprisonment, Najmrodzki escaped through the tunnel. He left a letter addressed to the warden in his cell, thanking him for his hospitality.

On 19 November 1989 in Kraków, while drunk with 0.21 BAC of alcohol in his blood, Najmrodzki crashed a Polski Fiat 132p he had stolen three days earlier into a street lamp. After the accident, he fled the scene but was captured after a fight with militia officers. He had a fake ID card, but after a fingerprint check, he was correctly identified. On 3 December 1990, Krowodrza regional court sentenced him to 7½ years' imprisonment. As a dangerous recidivist, he was imprisoned in Strzelce Opolskie. In total, he was sentenced to 20 years' imprisonment for his robberies, and 7 for his escapes. While in prison, he wrote a volume of poetry and aphorisms entitled Oblicza prawdy, which was published by Oficynie Wydawniczej Galicja publishing house in 1990; the book sold seven thousand copies and was reviewed in the journal Słowo Powszechne. Najmrodzki received no payment from the sales.

On 15 November 1994, Lech Wałęsa, the president of Poland, pardoned Najmrodzki as a "resocialized" person. Presidential advisor Lech Falandysz said of the pardon: "When Grzegorz Piotrowski, the killer of priest Popiełuszko, was prematurely released, the natural order of justice for the president was to pardon Najmrodzki". Najmrodzki subsequently promised to focus on business or farming instead of crime.

== Death ==
On 31 August 1995, Najmrodzki died in a car crash near Mława. While recklessly driving a stolen BMW car with a fake vehicle registration plate, he skidded and drove into a LIAZ lorry on the other side of the road. He had a fake ID card with him. His two passengers, 14- and 12-year-old boys, who were sons of Najmrodzki's friend, also died in the crash. Najmrodzki's identity was confirmed by said friend.

== In popular culture ==
Najmrodzki has been depicted in the documentary film Arsen Lupin po polsku. He was also the subject of the biography Poszukiwany Zdzisław Najmrodzki by Józef Łoziński, published in Wrocław in 1991. An episode of Wielkie napady PRL-u, a criminal documentary series, was dedicated to his exploits. His escape from prison via a tunnel in 1989 inspired a scene in the 1991 film V.I.P. directed by Juliusz Machulski. In 2018, Gliwice Town Theatre put on a play entitled Najmrodzki, czyli dawno temu w Gliwicach, based on his life. The 2021 film The Getaway King directed by Mateusz Rakowicz, is also based on his life.

== Works ==
- 1990: Oblicza prawdy, Oficyna Wydawnicza Galicja
