= Marta Malikowska =

Polish actress (born 1982)

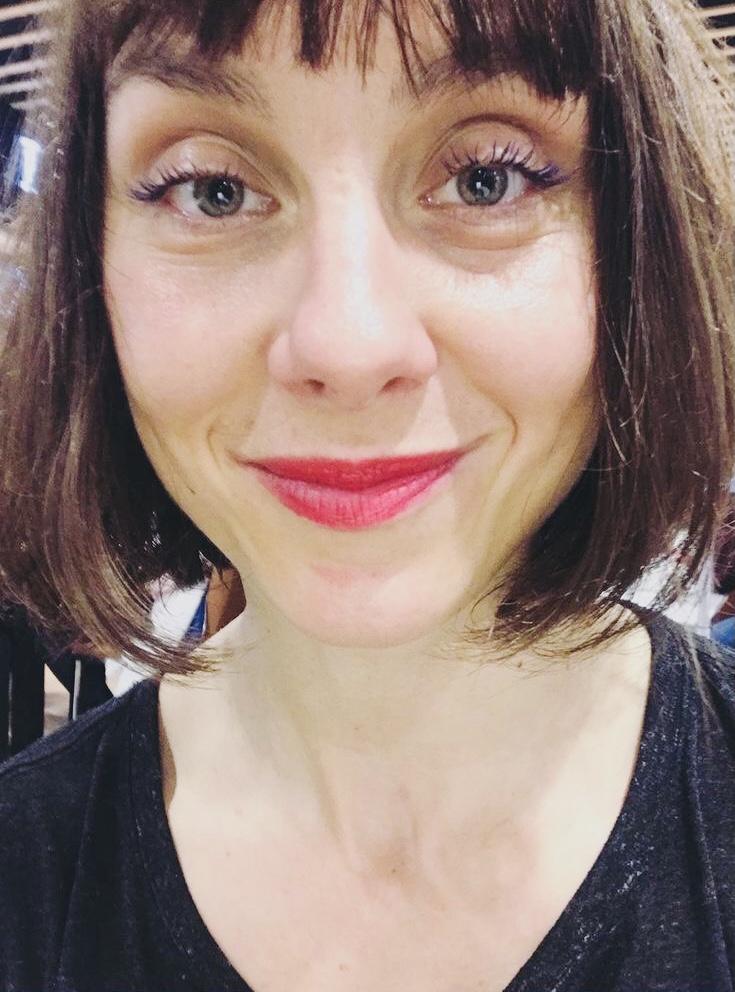
- Malikowska in 2020
- Born: 24 October 1982 (age 43); Subcarpathian Voivodeship, Poland
- Occupation: Actress
- Years active: 2006–present

Marta Malikowska (born 24 October 1982) is a Polish actress. She made her screen debut in the 2006 drama film, Przebacz, for which she received Polish Film Festival Award for Best Debut performance.

Malikowska graduated from the AST National Academy of Theatre Arts in Kraków. She later performed on stage. In 2018, Malikowska starred in the HBO Europe crime thriller series, Blinded by the Lights based on Jakub Żulczyk's 2014 novel of the same name. In 2021 she was cast as Agata 'Kosa' Strzelecka in the player.pl crime drama series, The Convict.

== Selected filmography ==
- Przebacz (2006)
- Ki (2011)
- The Lure (2015)
- Life Must Go On (2015)
- I, Olga Hepnarová (2016)
- Blinded by the Lights (6 episodes, 2018)
- Den of Vipers (7 episodes, 2018)
- Triple Trouble (2020)
- The Defence (5 episodes, 2020)
- The Convict (27 episodes, 2021—2024)
- Backwards (2022)
- Dad (2022)
- Infamy (1 episode, 2023)
