= Masza Wągrocka =

Polish actress (born 1993)

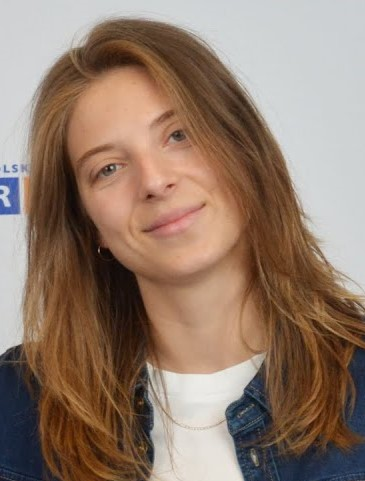
- Born: Marta Wągrocka; 3 October 1992 (age 33); Warsaw, Poland
- Education: Aleksander Zelwerowicz National Academy of Dramatic Art
- Occupation: Actress
- Years active: 2015–present

Marta "Masza" Wągrocka (Polish: [ˈmar.ta ˈma.ʂa vɔŋˈɡrɔt͡s.ka]; born 3 October 1992) is a film, television, voice, and stage actress based in Warsaw, Poland. She is known from feature films such as Alzur's Legacy (2019), The Getaway King (2021), and A Night at the Kindergarten (2022), as well as television series such as Diagnosis (2018), Zakochani po uszy (2019–2020), The King of Warsaw (2020), Planet Single: Eight Stories (2021), Krucjata. Prawo serii (2021), Glitter (2022), and The Mothers of Penguins (2024).

== Biography ==
Marta "Masza" Wągrocka was born on 3 October 1992 in Warsaw, Poland.

She studied musical arts for two years at the Stanisław Moniuszko Academy of Music in Gdańsk, before quitting to pursue a theatre acting career instead. In 2018, she graduated from the Aleksander Zelwerowicz National Academy of Dramatic Art in Warsaw.

Wągrocka began acting in theatre in 2015. Since 2017, she has been a member of the National Theatre in Warsaw. She also performed in other theatres in the city, such as Och-Teatr and Roma Musical Theatre.

She played in feature films such as Alzur's Legacy (2019), The Getaway King (2021), and A Night at the Kindergarten (2022), as well as in the television series such as Diagnosis (2018), Zakochani po uszy (2019–2020), The King of Warsaw (2020), Planet Single: Eight Stories (2021), Krucjata. Prawo serii (2021), Glitter (2022), and The Mothers of Penguins (2024). She is also a voice actresses, performing in Polish-language dubbing recordings.

== Filmography ==
=== Films ===
Year	Title	Role	Notes
2016	Autor Solaris	Halina	Documentary film
2018	Tacones		Short film
2018	Pradziady	Lady	Television play
2019	Alzur's Legacy	Filippa	
2019	The Resort		Short film
2021	The Getaway King	Teresa	
2021	Gluten Sex	Mr. Ryszard / Pola Data	
2021	Last Date	Girl at the phone	Short film
2022	A Night at the Kindergarten	Dorota Kwiatkowska	
2023	Mother's Day	Gang member	
2023	Moje stare	Anna's daughter	Short film
2024	Call Me Lala	Wera	Short film

=== Television series ===
Year	Title	Role	Notes
2018	Diagnosis	Jagna Bujak	2 episodes
2019–2020	Zakochani po uszy	Tamara Lenartowicz	Recurring role; 37 episodes
2020	Mały zgon	Hostess	Episode no. 10
2020	The King of Warsaw	Zosia	Recurring role; 5 episodes
2021	Planet Single: Eight Stories	Ewa Kuczyńska	Episode: "Detektor" (no. 6)
2021	Krucjata. Prawo serii	Ula Urbańska	10 episodes
2021	Wartime portraits. Women	Zofia Kernowa	Episode: "Władysława Macieszyna" (no. 3)
2022	Erin	Henryka Machl	Episode: "Tyzyfona" (no. 8)
2022	Glitter	Luna	2 episodes
2023	Kiedy ślub?	Gosia	8 episodes
2024	The Mothers of Penguins	Kamila Barska	Main role; 6 episodes
