= Sandra Korzeniak =

Polish actress (born 1976)

- Born: 23 September 1976 (age 50); Kraków, Poland
- Occupation: Actress
- Years active: 2000–present

Sandra Korzeniak (born 23 September 1976) is a Polish actress. She received Polish Academy Award for Best Actress nomination for her performance as opposition poet Barbara Sadowska in the 2021 drama film Leave No Traces and the Polish Academy Award for Best Supporting Actress nomination for playing Julie Kafka in the 2025 biographical drama Franz.

== Life and career ==
Korzeniak was born in Kraków, Poland and in 2000 graduated from the AST National Academy of Theatre Arts in Kraków. From 2000 to 2008 she performed on Helena Modrzejewska National Old Theatre and from 2008 performed on the Old Warszaw Theatre. In 2009 she received Paszport Polityki Award for playing Marilyn Monroe on stage. Her screen career began in 2005 appearing on the television soap opera Magda M.

In 2021, Korzeniak starred in the drama film, Leave No Traces directed by Jan P. Matuszyński. It was selected to compete for the Golden Lion at the 78th Venice International Film Festival. It was selected as the Polish entry for the Best International Feature Film at the 94th Academy Awards. For her performance she received Polish Academy Award for Best Actress nomination. Korzeniak later had a recurring roles in the Player crime dramas The Convict and The Behaviorist, and the HBO Max miniseries BringBackAlice. In 2023 she appeared in the Agnieszka Holland's drama film Green Border and in 2025 starred in Holland's biographical drama Franz. For her performance she received Polish Academy Award for Best Supporting Actress nomination.

== Filmography ==
=== Film ===
Year	Title	Role	Notes
2014	Neighborhooders	Neighbour with Dreams	
2015	Influence	Ms. Malicka	
2017	The Invisibles	Seamstress	
2018	A Hole in the Head	Woman	
2020	Triple Trouble	Dwukolorowa	
2021	Leave No Traces	Barbara Sadowska	Nominated — Polish Academy Award for Best Actress
2022	Day and Night	Nawoja	
2023	Green Border	Doctor in Hospital	
2025	Franz	Julie Kafka	Nominated — Polish Academy Award for Best Supporting Actress

=== Television ===
Year	Title	Role	Notes
2005	Magda M.	Lilka	3 episodes
2006	Na dobre i na złe	Elzbieta Nowaczyk	Episode: "Tchórzliwy bohater"
2018	1983	Caretaker	Episode: "Blowback"
2021-2022	The Convict	Jadwiga Kostrzewa	6 episodes
2022	The Behaviorist	Brygida's therapist	5 episodes
2023	Call My Agent!	Beata Ferens-Johnson	Episode: "2.6"
2023	Bring Back Alice	Milena	5 episodes
