= Michał Czernecki =

Polish actor (born 1978)

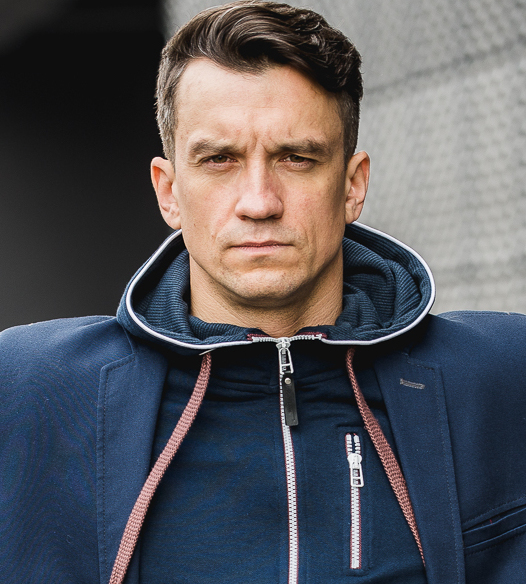
- Czernecki in 2015
- Born: 4 April 1978 (age 48); Sosnowiec, Poland
- Occupation: Actor
- Years active: 2000–present
- Spouse: Magdalena Czernecka
- Children: 2

Michał Czernecki (born 4 May 1978) is a Polish actor.

== Life and career ==
Czernecki was born in Sosnowiec, Poland. He attended the University of Silesia in Katowice and later graduated from the AST National Academy of Theatre Arts in Kraków. He began his career appearing in theatre, before roles on television and film. On television, he first starred in TVP1 series Na dobre i na złe (2005–2006), and Worth Loving (2005–2007). He later was regular cast member in Determinator, The Londoners, First Love, Medics, L for Love, The Chairman's Ear, Wartime Girls, Leśniczówka, and Diagnosis.

Czernecki had a recurring role in HBO Europe crime drama series, Blinded by the Lights in 2018 and from 2018 to 2020 starred in crime thriller, Signs. The following year he starred in the Player.pl police drama series, Motive. In 2019, he received Telekamery Award nomination for Best Actor. From 2021 to 2023, Czernecki starred in the Player.pl crime drama series, The Convict. He later was cast member on the HBO Max crime drama The Thaw and TVP crime drama Profiler (both 2024).

In film, Czernecki appeared in Polish-Russian War (2009), Walesa: Man of Hope (2013), Warsaw 44 (2014), Planet Single (2016), 25 Years of Innocence (2020), David and the Elves (2021), Letters to Santa 5 (2022), Scarborn (2023) and Home Sweet Home (2025).
