= Aleksandra Adamska =

Polish actress (born 1990)

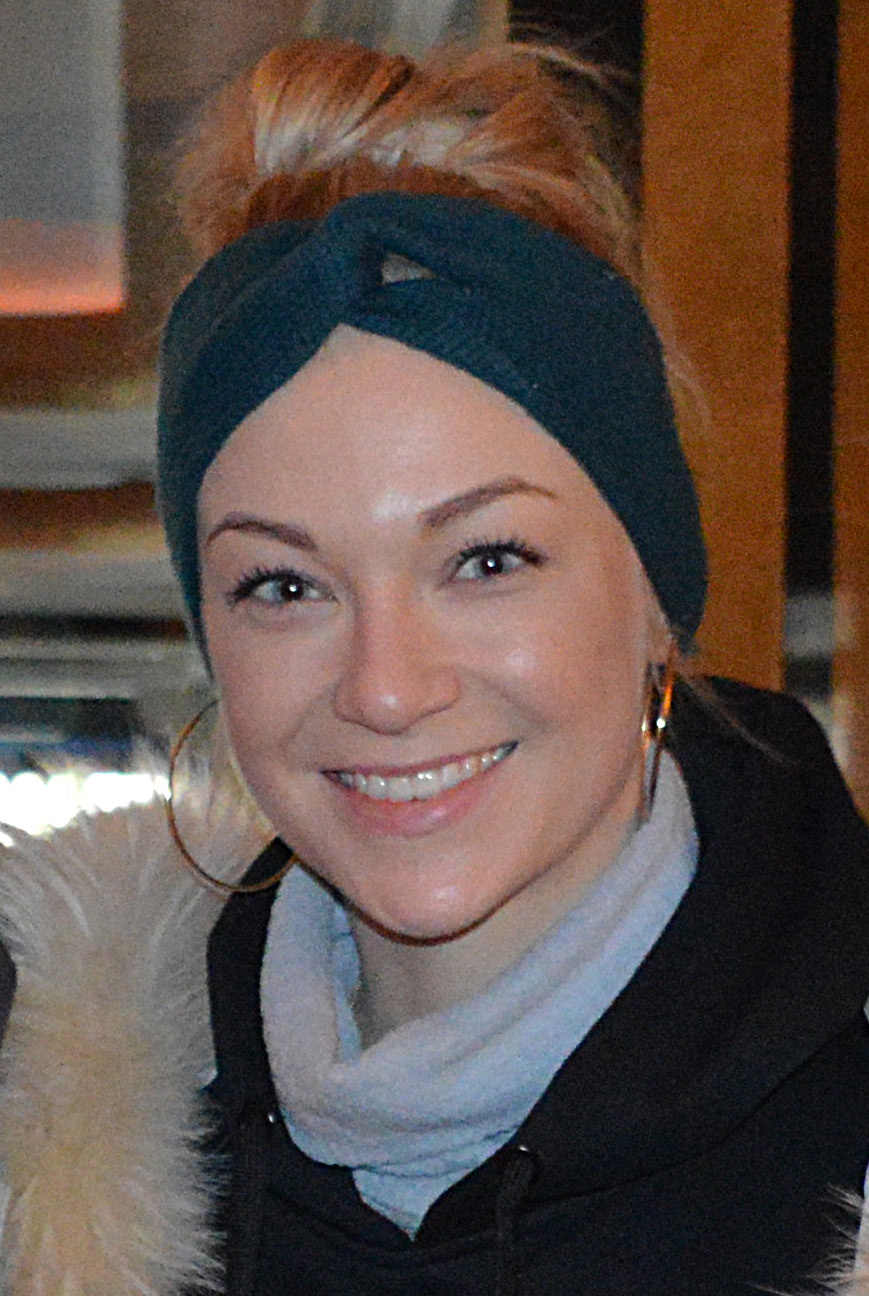
- Adamska in 2019
- Born: June 15, 1990 (age 36); Katowice, Poland
- Occupation: Actress
- Years active: 2011–present

Aleksandra Adamska (born June 15, 1990) is a Polish actress, known for her role as Patrycja 'Pati' Cichy in the Player.pl crime drama series, The Convict and its spin-off, Pati.

== Life and career ==
Adamska was born in Katowice. She graduated from the AST National Academy of Theatre Arts in Kraków and later began performing in Teatr Muzyczny Capitol in Wrocław. She began her career appearing in Polish soap operas First Love and Julia before making her big screen debut playing minor role in the 2014 war drama film, Warsaw 44. From 2017 to 2019, Adamska starred opposite Maja Ostaszewska in the medical drama series, Diagnosis, and from 2017 to 2021 in the comedy-drama O mnie się nie martw. In 2020 she starred in the Player.pl drama series, Królestwo kobiet.

In 2021, Adamska was cast as Patrycja Cichy 'Pati' in the Player.pl crime drama series, The Convict, receiving positive reviews for her performance as friend of series' lead (played by Agata Kulesza). She received Telekamery Award nomination for Best Actress in 2023. In 2023, Adamska went to star in the own spin-off series, Pati.

In 2022, Adamska co-starred in the Netflix comedy-drama miniseries, Family Secrets. In 2023, she starred in the romantic comedy film Slub doskonaly and the Netflix action thriller film, Soulcatcher.

== Filmography ==
=== Film ===
Year	Title	Role	Notes
2014	Warsaw 44	German Officer's Girl	
2015	Ameryka	Dzastina	Short film
2016	#WszystkoGra	Grandmother's friend	
2017	Panic Attack	Alicja	
2018	Love is Everything	Love is Everything	
2023	Slub doskonaly	Bride	
2023	Soulcatcher	'Burza'	

=== Television ===
Year	Title	Role	Notes
2011	First Love	Girl in bar	Episode
2012	Julia	Reporter	Episode
2013	Hotel 52	Karolina Malicka	Episode: 7.8
2014	Sama słodycz	Girl	Episode: 1.5
2016	Druga szansa	Laura	7 episodes
2017	Belle Epoque	Siostra Marta	Episode: 1.3
2017—2019	Diagnosis	Dagmara Mazurek	38 episodes
2020	Królestwo kobiet	Wera Klin	8 episodes
2017—2021	O mnie sie nie martw	Sylwia Malecka	102 episodes
2021—2024	The Convict	Patrycja Cichy 'Pati'	Series regular, 27 episodes Nominated — Telekamery Award for Best Actress (2023)
2022	Family Secrets	Agnieszka	8 episodes
2022—2023	Krucjata	Journalist Paulina Klejna	9 episodes
2023	Pati	Patrycja Cichy 'Pati'	6 episodes
2024	Go Ahead, Brother	Marta	
