= Cezary Łazarewicz =

Journalist and writer (born 1966)

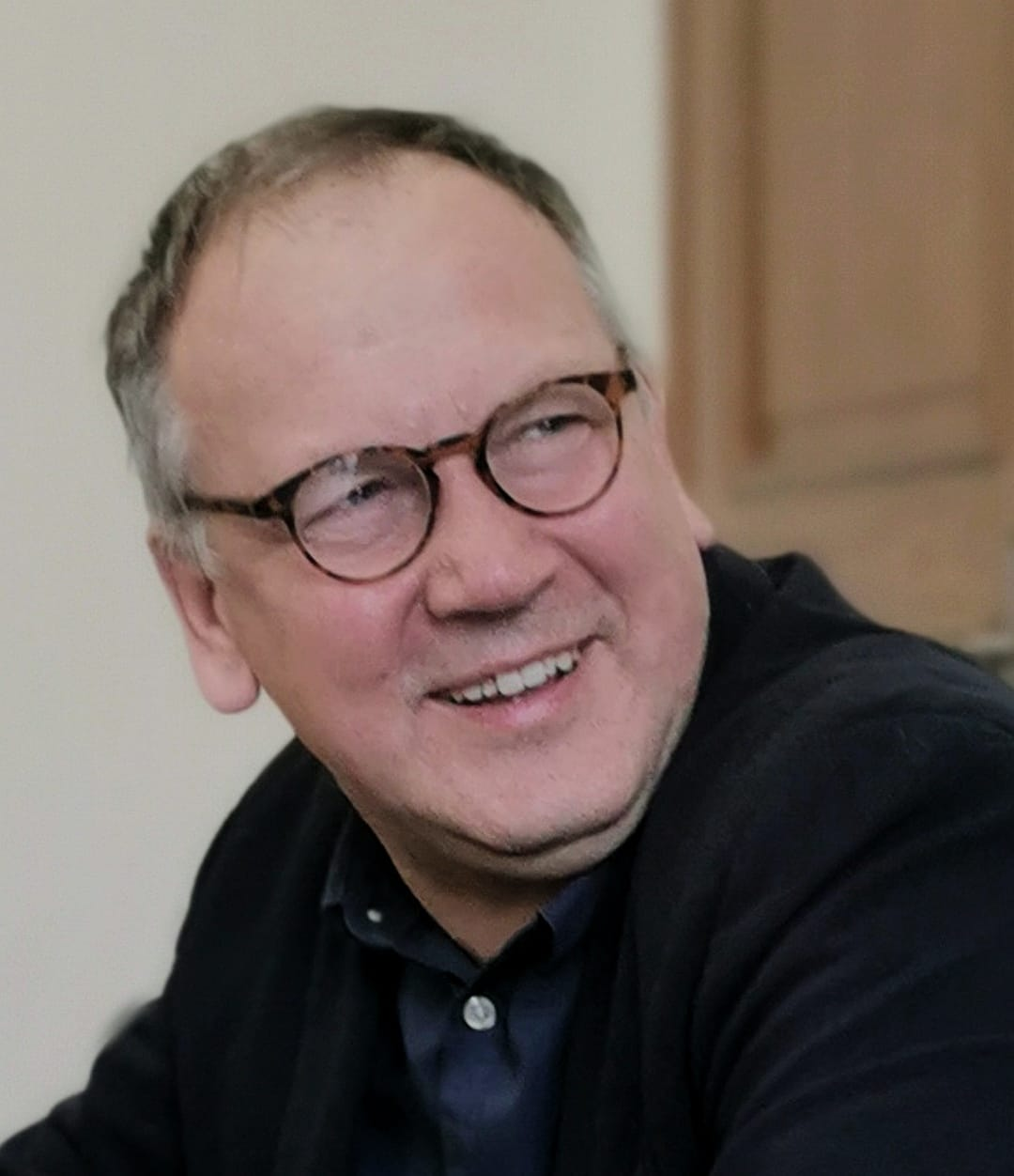
- Cezary Łazarewicz, 2021
- Born: 6 July 1966 (age 60)
- Occupations: Writer, journalist

Cezary Łazarewicz (born 6 July 1966) is a journalist and writer.

== Biography ==
In 2015 he was employed at Wirtualna Polska. In October 2025, he became president of Towarzystwo Dziennikarskie, replacing Seweryn Blumsztajn. He has written, among others, on Grzegorz Przemyk, Janusz Waluś and Stanisław Pyjas.

=== Żeby nie było śladów. Sprawa Grzegorza Przemyka ===
His book Żeby nie było śladów. Sprawa Grzegorza Przemyka was made into a film in 2021.

== Books ==
- Zapraszamy do Trójki. Agora. 2012. Co-authored with Ewa Winnicka.
- Kafka z Mrożkiem. Reportaże pomorskie. Obok. 2012.
- Sześć pięter luksusu. Przerwana historia Domu Braci Jabłkowskich. Znak. 2013.
- Elegancki morderca. W.A.B. 2015.
- Żeby nie było śladów. Sprawa Grzegorza Przemyka. Czarne. 2016.
- Tu mówi Polska. Reportaże z Pomorza. Czarne. 2017.
- Ja. Z Lechem Wałęsą rozmawiają Andrzej Bober, Cezary Łazarewicz. W.A.B. 2017. Co-authored with Andrzej Bober.
- Koronkowa robota. Sprawa Gorgonowej. Czarne. 2018.
- 1968. Czasy nadchodzą nowe. Agora. 2018. Co-authored with Ewa Winnicka.
- Nic osobistego. Sprawa Janusza Walusia. Sonia Draga Post factum. 2019.
- 1939. Wojna? Jaka wojna?. Czerwone i Czarne. 2019.
- Na Szewskiej. Sprawa Stanisława Pyjasa. Czytelnik. 2023.

== Awards ==
- Cross of Freedom and Solidarity (2014)
- Nike Award for Żeby nie było śladów. Sprawa Grzegorza Przemyka (2017)
