= Blinded by the Lights (TV series) =

Polish crime television series

- Polish: Ślepnąc od świateł
- Genre: Crime; thriller; neo-noir
- Created by: Krzysztof Skonieczny; Jakub Żulczyk
- Based on: Blinded by the Lights by Jakub Żulczyk
- Screenplay by: Krzysztof Skonieczny; Jakub Żulczyk
- Directed by: Krzysztof Skonieczny
- Starring: Kamil Nożyński; Jan Frycz; Robert Więckiewicz; Marta Malikowska; Janusz Chabior; Marzena Pokrzywińska; Cezary Pazura
- Composers: Marcin Masecki; Tomasz Mirt
- Country of origin: Poland
- Original language: Polish
- No. of seasons: 1
- No. of episodes: 8

Production
- Cinematography: Michał Englert
- Running time: 55–60 minutes
- Production companies: HBO; HBO Europe; House Media Company Sp. z o.o.

Original release
- Network: HBO Europe
- Release: 27 October 2018

Blinded by the Lights (Polish: Ślepnąc od świateł) is a Polish crime television series consisting of 8 episodes, which launched on HBO Europe on 27 October 2018. On 1 May 2019, it premiered in the United States.

It is based on Jakub Żulczyk's 2014 novel of the same name.

== Synopsis ==
The series spans seven days in the life of Kuba Nitecki, a well-known but mysterious Warsaw cocaine dealer whose clientele includes politicians, celebrities, businesspeople, hip-hop artists, and hipsters. Nitecki is among a group of local gangsters led by Władek "Stryj", who are in turn part of a bigger gang, led by Jacek. Tired of his life so far, Nitecki decides to escape to Argentina.

== Cast and characters ==
- Kamil Nożyński as Kuba Nitecki
- Jan Frycz as Dario
- Robert Więckiewicz as Jacek
- Marta Malikowska as Maria "Pazina" Pazińska
- Janusz Chabior as Władek "Stryj"
- Marzena Pokrzywińska as Paulina
- Cezary Pazura as Mariusz Fajkowski
