= Poster method =

Robbery strategy

Poster method (Note: Polish: metoda na plakat) is a robbery strategy, where a robber cuts a hole in a store's window and covers it with a poster, after entering the store, to mask the signs of robbery. The method was developed by a famous robber, Zdzisław Najmrodzki, who had used it to rob over 70 Pewex stores with luxury and scarce products. The case of the robberies had become popular among people and media across the entire country.
