= Voivodeship court =

Voivodeship court (Note: Polish: sąd wojewódzki) was a common court of the first instance in Polish People's Republic from 1950 to 1989, and in the Third Polish Republic from 1989 to 1998. On 1 January 1999, the voivodeship courts, had been reformed into the regional courts, with the 2nd article of the 1st legislative act of 18 December 1998.
