= The Getaway King =

- Film poster
- Directed by: Mateusz Rakowicz
- Written by: Łukasz M. Maciejewski; Mateusz Rakowicz
- Produced by: Agnieszka Odorowicz; Andrzej Papis
- Starring: Dawid Ogrodnik; Robert Więckiewicz; Masza Wągrocka; Rafał Zawierucha; Jakub Gierszał; Andrzej Andrzejewski; Sandra Drzymalska
- Cinematography: Jacek Podgórski
- Edited by: Sebastian Mialik
- Music by: Andrzej Smolik
- Production companies: TV & Film Production; Grupa Polsat Plus; Mazovia Warsaw Film Commission
- Distributed by: Dystrybucja Mówi Serwis
- Release dates: 18 August 2021 (New Horizons Film Festival); 16 September 2021 (cinema realise)
- Running time: 100 minutes
- Country: Poland
- Language: Polish
- Box office: $1 286 049

The Getaway King (Polish: Najmro. Kocha, kradnie, szanuje, lit. 'Najmro. Loves, steals, respects'; also simply known as Najmro) is a Polish-language action comedy film directed by Mateusz Rakowicz, and written by Rakowicz and Łukasz M. Maciejewski. The film had premiered on 18 August 2021 on the New Horizons Film Festival in Wrocław, Poland, and later in cinemas on 16 September 2021. The film was based on the life of Zdzisław Najmrodzki, a criminal and thief who was active in the Polish People's Republic in the 1980s, and who was notable for escaping from prison and the authorities 29 times.

== Cast ==
=== Main and secondary ===
- Dawid Ogrodnik as Zdzisław Najmrodzki
- Robert Więckiewicz as lieutenant Barski
- Rafał Zawierucha as Ujma
- Masza Wągrocka as Teresa
- Jakub Gierszał as Antos
- Andrzej Andrzejewski as Teplic
- Sandra Drzymalska as "Młoda"
- Dorota Kolak as Mira, Zdzisław's mother
- Tomasz Sapryk as Teresa's father
- Bartosz Roch Nowicki as Roch the hippe, Mira's boyfriend

=== Cameos ===
- Mikołaj Cieślak as the negotiating client
- Izabela Dąbrowska as the school headmaster
- Olga Bołądź as Gabi
- Adam Cywka as the captain of Civilian's Militia
- Artur Krajewski as the professor client
- Paweł Koślik as the "hen-pecked husband" client
- Barbara Wysocka as the wife of the hen-pecked husband client
- Grzegorz Falkowski as the "just watching" ("Apatche") client
- Olga Sarzyńska as miss "Poodle"
- Radosław Rożniecki as the actor in 997 progremme
- Arkadiusz Machel as Machela, the prison guard
- Robert Jarociński as the television presenter
- Marcin Sitek as the presenter of 997 programme
- Barbara Jonak as the forensic science technician
- Emil Brygoła as the receiver

== Production ==
The film was directed by Mateusz Rakowicz, marking his feature film debut. The script for the movie was written by Rakowicz and Łukasz M. Maciejewski. The film was produced by Agnieszka Odorowicz and Andrzej Papis. It was filmed in Kraków, Zabrze, and Warsaw, with Jacek Podgórski as the main cameraman. The music for the film was composed by Andrzej Smolik.

The film was primarily produced by TV & Film Production and additionally co-produced by Grupa Polsat Plus and Mazovia Warsaw Film Commission. It was subsidized by the Polish Film Institute and distributed in Poland by Dystrybucja Mówi Serwis.

The film premiered on 18 August 2021, at the New Horizons Film Festival in Wrocław, Poland, and later in cinemas on 16 September 2021. It was also screened at the Polish Film Festival at the end of September 2021. Originally planned to premiere in the autumn of 2020, it was rescheduled due to the COVID-19 pandemic.

== Awards ==
- The audience award at the 2021 Kraków Film Festival
- Award for the best costumes for Marta Ostrowicz at the 2021 Polish Film Festival
- Nomination for the Golden Lions award at the 2021 Polish Film Festival

== Reception ==
On the review aggregator website Rotten Tomatoes, 80% of 5 critics' reviews are positive, with an average rating of 7.2/10.
