= David and the Elves =

- Polish: Dawid i Elfy
- Directed by: Michał Rogalski
- Starring: Cyprian Grabowski; Jakub Zając; Cezary Żak; Monika Krzywkowska; Anna Smołowik; Michał Czernecki
- Cinematography: Maciej Lisiecki
- Edited by: Jarosław Kamiński
- Music by: Paweł Lucewicz
- Production companies: Netflix; Endemol Polska; Endemol Shine Polska
- Distributed by: Netflix
- Release date: December 6, 2021
- Country: Poland
- Language: Polish

David and the Elves (Polish: Dawid i Elfy) is a 2021 Polish Christmas comedy film directed by Michał Rogalski from a screenplay by Mateusz Kuczewski and Marcin Baczyński. The film was released worldwide on Netflix on December 6, 2021.

== Plot ==
A young boy named David lives with his parents and grandparents in the Tatra Mountains, and celebrates Christmas with the family and enjoys spending time with his family. 1 year later, he moves to Warsaw with his parents, who are now overwhelmed with work.

During the Christmas season, a popular elf named Albert runs away from the North Pole to restore his Christmas power, despite Santa's objections. Albert believes that people love him, but reality turns out to be different. During his time in Warsaw, he runs into David at the park and befriends him. Albert soon causes mischief during their time together, such as turning a giant truck into a toy, replacing the Christmas tree into a drum set, and turning David's father's fake Christmas beard into a real one. David tries to explain all of this to his parents, by mistakenly referencing Albert as a thief.

Santa decides to search for Albert, and realizes that he is slowly losing his Christmas power during his time with David, which can later transform him into a toy. Albert begins helping David using his magic, but fails to realize how this is affecting him.

Eventually, Albert loses his powers, and decides to journey back to the North Pole, David comes with him to help him get to know the real world. David's parents along with Santa Claus and Mrs. Claus, search for them. The two take shelter in a forest at night, but Albert transforms into a toy when David falls asleep, this reverts all the magic he had done before. When David realizes this, he runs with the now-toy Albert towards his grandparents' house, David's parents, along with Santa and Mrs. Claus, arrive at the scene.

David tries everything to make Albert come back to life, but fails to do so. David goes outside and finds footprints, Albert then appears behind him, much to the joy of David. Santa, Mrs. Claus and Albert return to the North Pole, and David and his parents' regain their Christmas spirt and spend time together, and ends with the latter singing Christmas carols, along with Albert and the other elves.

== Cast ==
- Cyprian Grabowski as David Kosmala
- Jakub Zając as Albert the Elf
- Anna Smolownik as Hania Kosmala, David's Mom
- Michał Czernecki as Piotr Kosmala, David's Dad
- Cezary Żak as Santa Claus
- Monika Krzywkowska as Mrs. Claus
- Piotr Rogucki as Erwin the Elf
- Elżbieta Jarosik as Grandma Matylda
- Witold Dębicki as Grandpa Ignacy

== Production ==
The movie was filmed mostly in Zakopane and Warsaw, Poland. It was released on December 6, 2021.

== Reception ==
Common Sense Media rated it 2 out of 5 stars.

== See also ==
- List of Christmas films
