= Leave No Traces =

2021 Polish film

- Theatrical release poster
- Polish: Żeby nie było śladów
- Directed by: Jan P. Matuszyński
- Produced by: Leszek Bodzak; Aneta Cebula-Hickinbotham
- Starring: Tomasz Ziętek; Sandra Korzeniak; Jacek Braciak; Agnieszka Grochowska; Robert Więckiewicz; Tomasz Kot; Aleksandra Konieczna; Sebastian Pawlak; Andrzej Chyra; Michał Żurawski; Bartłomiej Topa; Mateusz Górski
- Cinematography: Kacper Fertacz
- Edited by: Przemyslaw Chruscielewski
- Music by: Ibrahim Maalouf
- Production company: Aurum Film
- Release date: 9 September 2021 (Venice)
- Running time: 160 minutes
- Country: Poland
- Language: Polish
- Box office: $ 482 960

Leave No Traces (Polish: Żeby nie było śladów) is a 2021 Polish drama film directed by Jan P. Matuszyński. It was selected to compete for the Golden Lion at the 78th Venice International Film Festival. It was selected as the Polish entry for the Best International Feature Film at the 94th Academy Awards. The film is based on the book Żeby nie było śladów by Cezary Łazarewicz, which received the Nike Award in 2017.

== Plot ==
On May 12, 1983, Grzegorz Przemyk, the son of opposition poet Barbara Sadowska, is arrested and brutally beaten by a police patrol. He dies two days later. Poland is still under martial law, imposed by the communist regime to suppress the Solidarity movement. The only witness to the violent assault is Grzegorz's friend, Jurek Popiel, who decides to fight for justice and testify against the police. Initially, the state apparatus, including the Ministry of the Interior, underestimates the situation. However, when 20,000 people march behind Przemyk's coffin in Warsaw, the authorities decide to use all available means to intimidate the witness and Grzegorz's mother, trying to prevent Jurek from testifying in court.

== Cast ==
- Mateusz Górski as Grzegorz Przemyk
- Sandra Korzeniak as Barbara Sadowska
- Agnieszka Grochowska as Grażyna Popiel (Jurek's mother)
- Tomasz Ziętek as Jurek Popiel
- Tomasz Kot as Kowalczyk
- Robert Wieckiewicz as General Czesław Kiszczak
- Jacek Braciak as Tadeusz Popiel (Jurek's father)
- Aleksandra Konieczna as Wiesława Bardon

== Reception ==
Review aggregator Rotten Tomatoes gives the film 62% approval rating based on 13 reviews, with an average rating of 6.40 out of 10.

Wendy Ide of The Observer called Leave No Traces "[a] meticulously detailed thriller", while Cath Clarke of The Guardian said that "In the end, this film is never uninteresting but fails to gather enough pace or power for the slog of the marathon".

Paul Whitington of the Irish Independent had criticized film's length but praised it for being a "conspiracy drama", adding that "[it's] a lesson from history that remains depressingly relevant".

Kevin Maher of The Times said that "[the film is a] deep dive into student's murder is self-important".

According to Guy Lodge of Variety, the film is "[a] moving but somewhat congested", while Keith Uhlich of The Hollywood Reporter described Leave No Traces as "Too torturous by half".

While attending film's Venice screening, Deadline Hollywood's Valerie Complex wrote that "Leave No Traces often feels formless and unremarkable".

== See also ==
- List of submissions to the 94th Academy Awards for Best International Feature Film
- List of Polish submissions for the Academy Award for Best International Feature Film
