= Heko Czermno =

Polish football club

HEKO Czermno
- Full name: Klub Sportowy HEKO Czermno
- Founded: 17 August 1998; 27 years ago
- Dissolved: 2011; 14 years ago
- Ground: HEKO Stadium
- Capacity: 2,500

KS HEKO Czermno was a Polish football club based in Czermno, Poland.

HEKO was founded in 1998, and after a meteoric rise up the league pyramid, it fell into financial difficulties twice and finally folded in 2011.

It reached the second division in 2005 after having started at the very bottom of the pyramid upon its foundation. However, that proved to be a big financial burden, and the club withdrew at the season's conclusion after narrowly missing out on promotion in the promotion play-offs to Stal Stalowa Wola. After starting once again from the bottom of the pyramid in 2006, the club reached the fifth division in 2008. By the 2009–2010 season, the club had financial problems once more andn despite good results, withdrew mid-way. The club started at the bottom of the pyramid once more in 2010 and completed the season, but ultimately ceased operations in 2011.

== See also ==
- Football in Poland
- List of football teams
