= The Behaviorist =

Polish crime drama television series

- Polish Player poster
- Polish: Behawiorysta
- Genre: Crime drama
- Based on: Behawiorysta by Remigiusz Mróz
- Written by: Bartosz Janiszewski; Maciej Kazula
- Directed by: Łukasz Palkowski; Marek Wróbel
- Starring: Robert Więckiewicz; Krystian Pesta
- Composer: Bartosz Chajdecki
- Country of origin: Poland
- Original language: Polish
- No. of seasons: 1
- No. of episodes: 8

Production
- Producers: Tomasz Cichoń; Violetta Furmaniuk-Zaorska
- Cinematography: Marian Prokop
- Editors: Jan Kidawa-Błoński Jr.; Paweł Witecki
- Running time: 40–47 minutes
- Production companies: TVN; Aktiv Media

Original release
- Network: TVN; Player
- Release: 4 January 2022

The Behaviorist (Polish: Behawiorysta) is a Polish crime drama television series based on the novel Behawiorysta by Remigiusz Mróz. It began airing on Player on 4 January 2022.

== Premise ==
Gerard Edling, a former prosecutor and expert in kinesics, is tasked with helping track down a man who took students hostage in Opole.

== Cast ==
- Robert Więckiewicz as Gerard Edling
- Krystian Pesta as Horst Zeiger
- Katarzyna Dąbrowska as Brygida Edling
- Anna Mrozowska as Prosecutor Beata Drejer
- Mirosław Haniszewski as Commissioner Marek Rosner
- Magdalena Czerwińska as Prosecutor Alicja Ubertowska
- Maria Sobocińska as Emilia Edling
- Anna Próchniak as Sergeant Weronika Dzwonek
- Ewa Kolasińska as Mrs. Jadwiga Puta
- Rafał Zawierucha as Sebastian Bielak
- Marzena Kipiel-Sztuka as Horst's aunt
- Sandra Korzeniak as Brygida's therapist
- Sebastian Pawlak as Kamil
- Mirosław Zbrojewicz as Prosecutor Tomasz Rząsa
- Andrzej Walden as Ireneusz Jeleń
- Daria Kalinchuk as Zofia Iwanienko
- Maja Malesa as Lena

== Episodes ==
No.	Title	Duration	Original release date
1	"Episode 1"	47 min	4 January 2022
2	"Episode 2"	46 min	11 January 2022
3	"Episode 3"	42 min	18 January 2022
4	"Episode 4"	43 min	25 January 2022
5	"Episode 5"	40 min	1 February 2022
6	"Episode 6"	41 min	8 February 2022
7	"Episode 7"	46 min	15 February 2022
8	"Episode 8"	44 min	22 February 2022

== Production ==
Filming for the series began in May 2021 in Opole.
