= Family Secrets (2022 TV series) =

2022 Polish television series

- Polish Netflix poster
- Polish: Gry rodzinne
- Genre: Comedy drama
- Written by: Agnieszka Pilaszewska
- Directed by: Łukasz Ostalski
- Starring: Eliza Rycembel; Izabela Kuna; Małgorzata Mikołajczak; Piotr Pacek; Bartosz Gelner; Edyta Olszówka; Paweł Deląg
- Composer: Marcin Macuk
- Country of origin: Poland
- Original language: Polish
- No. of episodes: 8

Production
- Producer: Michał Kwieciński
- Cinematography: Mikołaj Łebkowski
- Editors: Przemysław Lisak; Tymoteusz Wiskirski; Tomasz Ciesielski
- Running time: 41–51 minutes
- Production company: Akson Studio

Original release
- Network: Netflix
- Release: 31 August 2022

Family Secrets (Polish: Gry rodzinne) is a Polish comedy drama television miniseries. It was released on Netflix on 31 August 2022.

== Premise ==
Kaśka and Jan's wedding day turns chaotic as their families' web of secrets and lies begins to unravel.

== Cast ==
- Eliza Rycembel as Katarzyna "Kaśka" Bilska
- Izabela Kuna as Małgorzata Bilska
- Małgorzata Mikołajczak as Alicja Bilska
- Piotr Pacek as Paweł Drzewiecki
- Bartosz Gelner as Jan Jaworowicz
- Edyta Olszówka as Dorota Jaworowicz
- Paweł Deląg as Emil Jaworowicz
- Adrian Zaremba as Robert
- Agnieszka Suchora as Teresa
- Alma Asuai as Anka
- Cezary Kosiński as Father Andrzej
- Dominika Kluźniak as Joanna
- Aleksandra Adamska as Agnieszka
- Waldemar Błaszczyk as Krzysztof
- Ewa Gawryluk as Helena
- Szymon Kukla as Lucjan Rajski
- Jakub Przebindowski as Jędrzej, the rector
- Barbara Rogowska as Agnieszka and Jędrzej's daughter
- Zofia Rogowska as Agnieszka and Jędrzej's daughter
- Paweł Tomaszewski as Maciek, the photographer
- Bogumiła Trzeciakowska as Klara Matysewicz
- Marek Kalita as Marek Bilski
- Anna Romantowska as Jolanta
- Marcin Korcz as Dawid

== Episodes ==
No.	Title	Duration	Original release date
1	"Episode 1"	51 min	31 August 2022
2	"Episode 2"	42 min	31 August 2022
3	"Episode 3"	49 min	31 August 2022
4	"Episode 4"	48 min	31 August 2022
5	"Episode 5"	44 min	31 August 2022
6	"Episode 6"	41 min	31 August 2022
7	"Episode 7"	42 min	31 August 2022
8	"Episode 8"	43 min	31 August 2022

== Reception ==
Reviewing the series' first episode, Johnny Loftus of Decider wrote, "Family Secrets feels very contemporary with its narrative switchbacks and various tiers of love life damage. It’ll be interesting to see who’s with who and what has finally been said out loud once this wedding day ends eight episodes from now." Molly Hirsch of The Michigan Daily wrote, "While the timelines frequently shift throughout the episode, the plot remains engaging and surprisingly easy to follow. With each additional character and narrative, Family Secrets continuously builds suspense by hinting at secrets like potential affairs and unexpected relationships. As a result, the viewer can’t help but want to binge the entire eight-episode series in one sitting."
