= Czermno, Świętokrzyskie Voivodeship =

Czermno
- Village
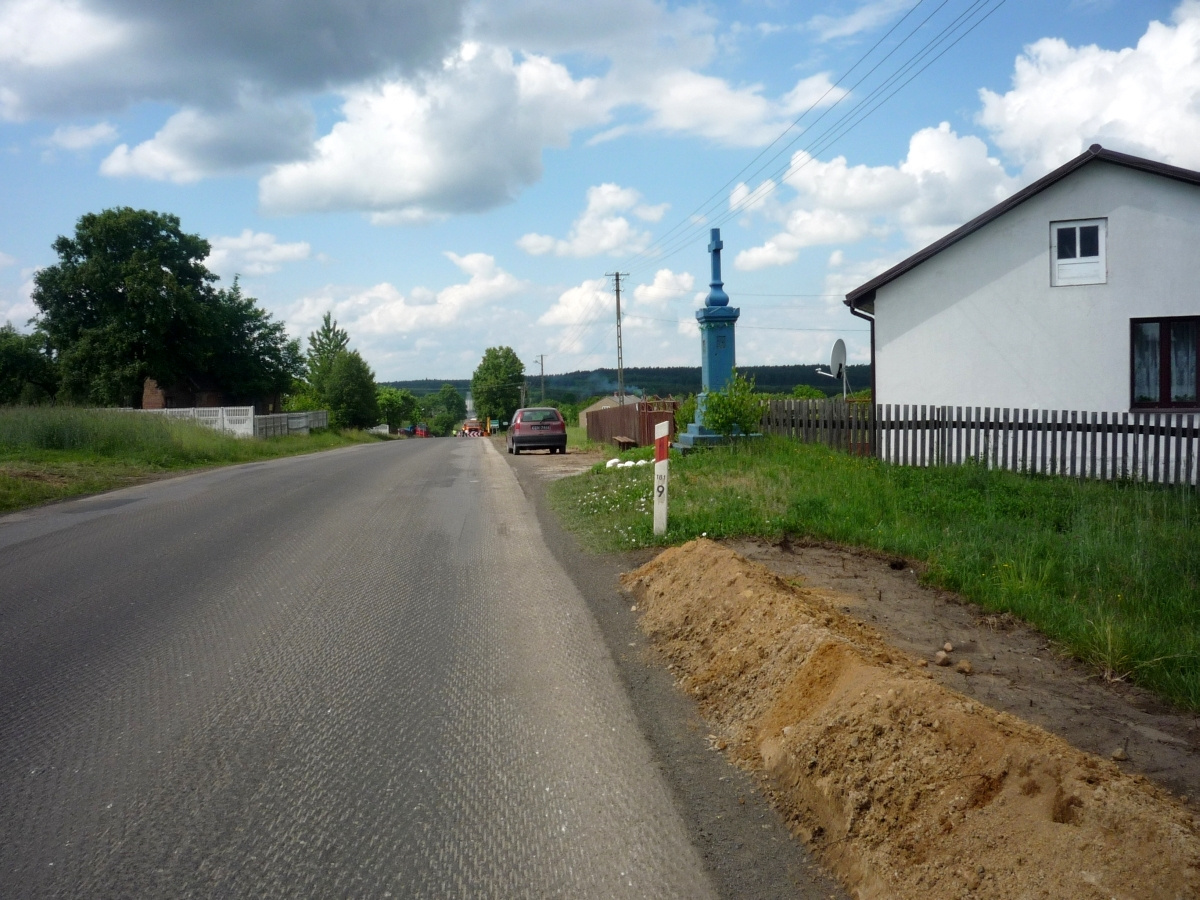

- Location within Poland
- Coordinates: 51°6′40″N 20°1′30″E
- Country: Poland
- Voivodeship: Świętokrzyskie
- County: Końskie
- Gmina: Fałków
- Population: 850
- Website: http://czermno-moje.ovh.org

Czermno [ˈt͡ʂɛrmnɔ] is a village in the administrative district of Gmina Fałków, within Końskie County, Świętokrzyskie Voivodeship, in south-central Poland. It lies approximately 6 km (4 mi) south-west of Fałków, 30 km (19 mi) west of Końskie, and 49 km (30 mi) north-west of the regional capital Kielce.

The village used to be home of the professional association football team Heko Czermno.
