= Blinded by the Lights (novel) =

2014 novel by Jakub Żulczyk

- First edition
- Author: Jakub Żulczyk
- Original title: Ślepnąc od świateł
- Language: Polish
- Genre: Thriller
- Publisher: Świat Książki
- Publication date: 22 October 2014
- Publication place: Poland
- Media type: Novel
- OCLC: 1085680381
- Preceded by: Sanctuary
- Followed by: The Hill of Dogs

Blinded by the Lights (Polish: Ślepnąc od świateł) is a novel by Jakub Żulczyk, first published in Poland on 22 October 2014.

== Background ==
Żulczyk wrote Blinded by the Lights based on personal experience with Warsaw's nightlife. Creating this novel was his way to settle the dark side of his past, which included alcohol and drug abuse. He completed writing it in half a year.

== Plot ==
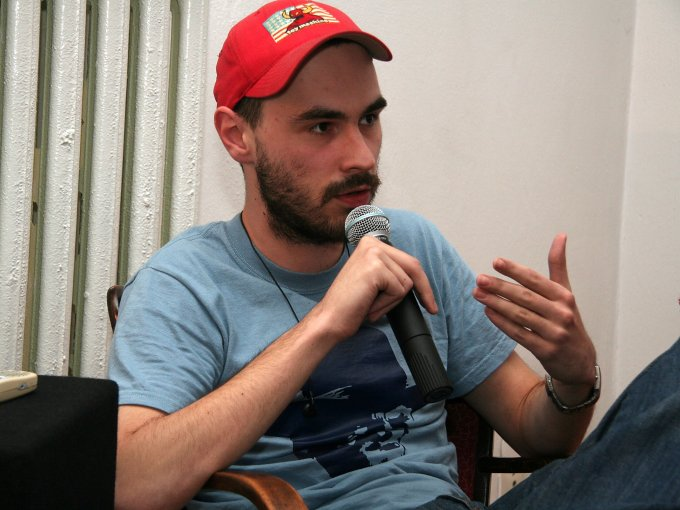
Jakub Żulczyk

Jacek is a young man who settles in Warsaw and in order to obtain a better future than his peers, he begins to work as a drug dealer. He is a neat, nihilistic perfectionist who sleeps during the day and works at night, delivering cocaine to the upper-class citizens of the Polish capital. While helping the criminal group he gets the drugs from, led by Piotr, Jacek observes a very dark and brutal side of Warsaw, which seems to be a ruthless living creature itself.

The novel covers one week of Jacek's life, which involves strict rules: no alcohol, no drugs, and no deep relations, which could distract his attention during work. During the pre-Christmas period, Jacek plans to escape from his everyday routine by flying to Argentina, but things start to go out of control when he agrees to keep a strange bag full of drugs for Stryj, another member of Piotr's criminal group.

After eight years spent in prison, old-school gangster Dario, former crime partner of Piotr, is released. As he gets back into the drug business, he realizes that during his absence, some parts of his property were stolen. His and Jacek's paths soon cross, which is not a good sign for the young dealer, whose perfect life starts to fall apart.

== Reception ==
By November 2018, approximately 80,000 copies of Blinded by the Lights were sold.

The novel received positive feedback from readers and critics. It was nominated for the Paszport Polityki prize in 2014.

== Television series ==
On 27 October 2018, Blinded by the Lights premiered on HBO Go. The 8-episode series was created by Krzysztof Skonieczny and Jakub Żulczyk, based on the plot of the novel.
