= Glitter (Polish TV series) =

Polish drama television series

- Polish: Brokat
- Genre: Drama
- Created by: Aleksandra Chmielewska; Maciej Kubicki
- Written by: Aleksandra Chmielewska; Maciej Kubicki; Sławomir Łonisk; Marek Baranowski; Alicja Arominska-Woyde; Ewa Stec
- Directed by: Anna Kazejak; Marek Lechki; Julia Kolberger; Rafał Skalski
- Starring: Magdalena Popławska; Wiktoria Filus; Matylda Giegżno
- Composers: Jerzy Rogiewicz; Bartłomiej Tyciński
- Country of origin: Poland
- Original language: Polish
- No. of seasons: 1
- No. of episodes: 10

Production
- Producer: Maciej Kubicki
- Cinematography: Paweł Flis
- Editors: Aleksandra Gowin; Beata Walentowska; Hubert Pusek
- Running time: 28–35 minutes
- Production companies: Netflix; Telemark

Original release
- Network: Netflix
- Release: 14 December 2022

Glitter (Polish: Brokat) is a Polish drama television series. It was released on Netflix on 14 December 2022.

== Premise ==
The series follows the lives of three sex workers in Sopot in 1976, during the Gierek era of Communist Poland.

== Cast ==
- Magdalena Popławska as Helena Michałowska
- Wiktoria Filus as Pola
- Matylda Giegżno as Marysia
- Bartłomiej Kotschedoff as Bogdan
- Szymon Piotr Warszawski as Władek
- Łukasz Simlat as Adam
- Stanisław Linowski as Staszek
- Jędrzej Hycnar as Jurek
- Folco Marchi as Tomas Barre

== Episodes ==
| No. | Title | Duration | Original release date |
|---|---|---|---|
| 1 | "The Night of Love" (Noc miłości) | 35 min | 14 December 2022 |
| 2 | "Welcome to the Club" | 34 min | 14 December 2022 |
| 3 | "I Want You to Watch" (Chcę, żebyś patrzył) | 32 min | 14 December 2022 |
| 4 | "It Will Be Sunny" (Będzie słonecznie) | 28 min | 14 December 2022 |
| 5 | "What About Sex?" (A seks?) | 29 min | 14 December 2022 |
| 6 | "What a Girl Dreams Of" (O czym marzy dziewczyna) | 35 min | 14 December 2022 |
| 7 | "Stripteases Galore" (Noc striptizów wszelakich) | 28 min | 14 December 2022 |
| 8 | "Not All at Once" (Nie wszystko od razu) | 29 min | 14 December 2022 |
| 9 | "Peace Cup" (Puchar Pokoju) | 33 min | 14 December 2022 |
| 10 | "The Feast of Song" (Święto piosenki) | 35 min | 14 December 2022 |

== Production ==
Showrunner Aleksandra Chmielewska was inspired to create the series after reading a Polityka article by Anna Dobrowolska about sex work in the Polish People's Republic. Chmielewska stated, "In the first half of the Gierek decade, Poland opened up to the West. Foreigners began to come to us and pay in dollars... Women earned as much for one [sexual encounter] with a client as others earned for a month of working in an office. Sex work was one of the few, if not the only, ways to achieve financial independence. Sex workers were among the country's elite."

The series was filmed in the Tri-City area, including Sopot, Orłowo in Gdynia, and Hala Olivia and Biskupia Górka in Gdańsk.

== Reception ==
Joel Keller of Decider wrote, "Glitter makes a real effort to concentrate on its main characters instead of leaning on period clichés, and does so without judgement or a sense of kitsch. Because of that, the characters have room to breathe and develop, something you don’t always see on shows set in the wild '70s."

Andrzej Kulasek of Gazeta Wyborcza referred to Glitter as "a Polish series that surprises with a well-written script, a coherent story, great acting and fantastic editing." Małgorzata Major of Wirtualne Media commended Glitter's cinematography, production design, and costume design, calling the series "beautifully filmed" and "the most stylish production I have seen this year." She cited, however, the series' banality and clichés, writing, "The series does worse when it tries to tell the complex stories of its characters. The closer we get to the finale, the more we run aground."
