= The Convict (TV series) =

Polish television series

- Genre: Crime drama
- Created by: Ewa Ornacka
- Based on: Skazane na potępienie by Ewa Ornacka
- Developed by: Karolina Szymczyk-Majchrzak
- Directed by: Bartosz Konopka
- Starring: Agata Kulesza; Michał Czernecki; Bartłomiej Topa
- Country of origin: Poland
- Original language: Polish
- No. of seasons: 4
- No. of episodes: 27

Production
- Production companies: Player Original; TVN

Original release
- Network: Player (seasons 1–3); Max (season 4)
- Release: 31 August 2021 – 28 June 2024

The Convict (Polish: Skazana) is a Polish crime drama series created by Ewa Ornacka and based on her book Skazane na potępienie. The series stars Agata Kulesza as a successful judge Alicja Mazur from Katowice, who is accused of a murder she did not commit. In prison, Mazur tries to survive among the women she previously sent to prison.

The first 8-episode season premiered on 31 August 2021 on Player.pl. The second season premiered on November 11, 2022. The third season premiered on November 10, 2023. The fourth and final season premiered on Max on June 11, 2024. In 2023, a spin-off series titled Pati starring Aleksandra Adamska as Patrycja Cichy 'Pati', was released on Player.pl.

In 2023, The Convict received Telekamery Award for Best Series. The series was most-watched original series on Player.pl in 2022 and 2023. The series premiered internationally on Max in 2023.

== Cast and characters ==
- Agata Kulesza as Judge Alicja Mazur
- Aleksandra Adamska as Patrycja Cichy 'Pati'
- Marta Malikowska as Agata Strzelecka 'Kosa'
- Michał Czernecki as Pawel Witkowski
- Martyna Byczkowska as Hania Mazur
- Bartłomiej Topa as Piotr Serafin
- Marta Scislowicz as Doctor Basia Dworak
- Tomasz Schuchardt as Bartlomiej Dworak
- Joanna Gonschorek as Swieta Palamarczuk
- Dawid Zawadzki as Prison Guard Smentoch
- Hanna Klepacka as Krystyna Nowak 'Campina'
- Hanna Chojnacka as Anna Wisniewska
- Blanka Mietkiewicz as Prisoner 'Lewa'
- Monika Dawidziuk as Amfisa Borkow
- Kinga Jasik as Wiktoria Panek 'Wiki'
- Adam Woronowicz as Sylwester Hepner
- Jacek Beler as Mariusz Piotrowski 'Mario'
- Karolina Micula as Prisoner 'Krzywa'
- Maria Kania as Marika Lisiecka
- Sebastian Lach as Policeman Jakub Cedro
- Sonia Mietielica as Natalia Dolecka
- Barbara Jonak as Anna Rabczuk
- Grażyna Bułka as Wiesia
- Gabriela Muskała as Dorota Wójcik
- Leszek Lichota as Michał Kraszecki
- Wojciech Kalarus as Minister
- Monika Obara as Prison Guard Zietarek
- Irena Melcer as Mariolka
- Angelika Cegielska as 'Biba'
- Marta Stalmierska as 'Shiba'

== Episodes ==
Season	Episodes	Originally released		
Season	Episodes	First released	Last released	Network
1	8	August 31, 2021	October 19, 2021	Player
2	8	November 11, 2022	December 30, 2022	Player
3	7	November 10, 2023	December 22, 2023	Player
4	4	June 11, 2024	June 28, 2024	Max

== Spin-off ==
In November 2022, in was reported that Player.pl ordered The Convict spin-off, Pati starring Aleksandra Adamska as Patrycja Cichy 'Pati'. The series recovers around Pati's life before the prison. The cast also includes Konrad Eleryk (as Pati's lover, Krystian Malek), Agnieszka Przepiórska (as Pati' mother, Barbara Julita Cichy), Natalia Wolska, Fryderyk Surowiec, Ewa Gawryluk, Mark Richter and Magdalena Walach. Agata Kulesza guest-starred in the season finale. The six-episode series premiered on April 28, 2023 on Player.pl. It became second most-watched series after The Convict on the streaming service in 2023.

== Accolades ==
Accolades received by Black Panther: Wakanda Forever
Award	Year	Category	Recipient(s)	Result	Ref.
Telekamery Award	2023	Best Series		Won	
Telekamery Award	2023	Best Actress	Aleksandra Adamska	Nominated	
Telekamery Award	2023	Best Actor	Michal Czernecki	Nominated	
