= Mateusz Rakowicz =

Film and television director and screenwriter

- Born: 12 July 1977 (age 48); Gdańsk, Poland
- Education: Academy of Fine Arts in Warsaw; Wajda School
- Occupations: Director, screenwriter, storyboard artist

Mateusz Rakowicz (Polish: [maˈtɛ.uʂ raˈkɔ.vit͡ʂ]; born 12 July 1977), also known as Mateusz Rakowicz-Raczyński (Polish: [maˈtɛ.uʂ raˈkɔ.vit͡ʂ raˈt͡ʂɘ̟ɲ.ski]), is a film director, screenwriter and storyboard artist.

== Biography ==
Mateusz Rakowicz was born on 12 July 1977 in Gdańsk, Poland. He graduated from the Academy of Fine Arts and Wajda School in Warsaw, Poland. He is a member of the Polish Filmmakers Association, and since 2003, he teaches at the Wajda School.

He was a storyboard artist on films The Aryan Couple (2004), Janosik: A True Story (2009), Courage (2011), 1939 Battle of Westerplatte (2013), and Volta (2017). He also was directed and wrote award-winning short films Latarnik (2013) and Romantik (2016).

He was a co-director co-writer of a 2013 feature film Warsaw Stories. His theatrical directoral debut took place in 2021, with an action comedy film The Getaway King. He also directed a 2023 action film Mother's Day. He also created the 2023 thriller television series Sortownia, and wrote its first episode.

== Filmography ==
Year	Title	Position	Notes	Ref.
2004	The Aryan Couple	Storyboard artist	Feature film	
2005	Melodramat	Storyboard artist	Short film	
2007	Latarnik	Director, screenwriter, producer, storyboard artist	Short film	
2007	Wino truskawkowe	Shooting board artist	Feature film	
2009	Janosik: A True Story	Storyboard artist	Feature film	
2009	Dekalog 89+	Storyboard artist	TV series; episode: "Street Feeling" (no. 7)	
2010	Glasgow	Second team director	Short film	
2011	Courage	Storyboard artist	Feature film	
2011	Urodziny	Storyboard artist	Short film	
2013	1939 Battle of Westerplatte	Storyboard artist	Feature film	
2013	The Big Leap	Storyboard artist	Short film	
2013	Warsaw Stories	Director, screenwriter	Feature film	
2014	Foreign Body	Assistant director	Feature film	
2016	Romantik	Director, screenwriter	Short film	
2017	Volta	Storyboard artist	Feature film	
2021	The Getaway King	Director, screenwriter	Feature film	
2022	Delivery by Christmas	Creative director	Feature film	
2023	Mother's Day	Director, screenwriter	Feature film	
2023	Sortownia	Show creator, also screenwriter (episode no. 1)	TV series	
