= Murder of Grzegorz Przemyk =

Victim of police brutality

Coordinates: 52°15′03″N 20°58′14″E

Grzegorz Przemyk
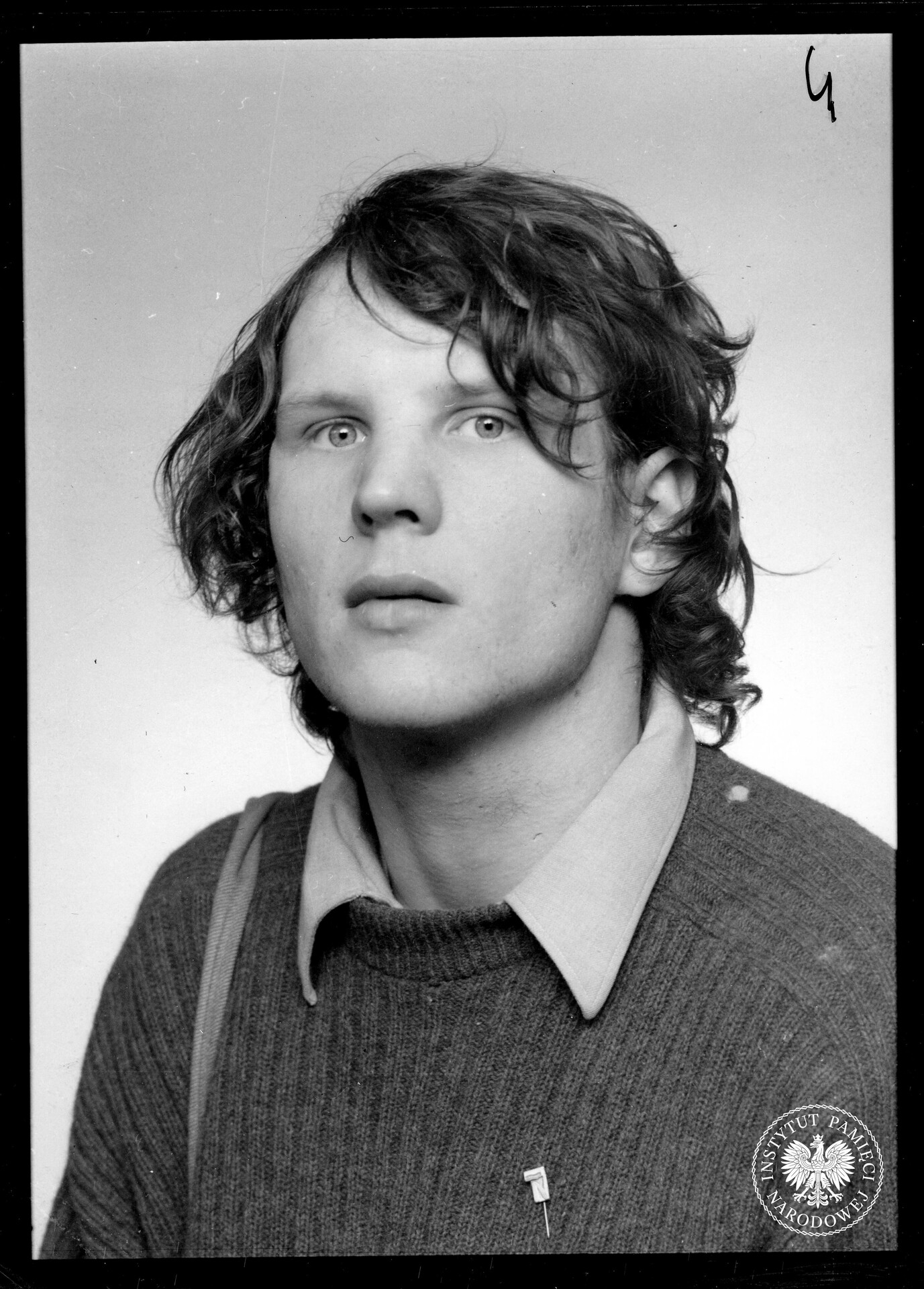
- Born: 17 May 1964; Warsaw, Poland
- Died: 14 May 1983 (aged 18); Warsaw, Poland
- Cause of death: Beaten to death by functionaries of Milicja Obywatelska (Citizens' Militia)
- Resting place: Powązki Cemetery
- Education: XVII Modrzewski High School in Warsaw
- Awards: Knight's Cross of the Order of Polonia Restituta

Grzegorz Przemyk (17 May 1964 – 14 May 1983) was an aspiring Polish poet from Warsaw, who was murdered by members of the Communist police force, the Milicja Obywatelska (Citizens' Militia). His killing was one of many such politically motivated murders perpetrated against democratic opposition by the Communist regime of Poland during the martial law period.

== Beating and death ==
Grzegorz Przemyk was the only child of Barbara Sadowska and they lived together in what was described as "a tiny flat on the eleventh floor of a tower block in the centre of Warsaw".

His mother, Barbara Sadowska, who was a poet and a member of the Workers' Defence Committee, was frequently arrested and questioned by the Polish Secret Service (Służba Bezpieczeństwa, SB) for her activities in the opposition movement. On several occasions officers questioning her made various threats, including suggestions that her only son, Grzegorz, might be hurt in an accident. The last time she was questioned before the incident was at the end of April 1983. On 3 May 1983, she was assaulted by "unknown perpetrators".

12 May 1983 was the day of Grzegorz's graduation from high school, as well as the anniversary of death of Józef Piłsudski, a statesman and leader of the Second Polish Republic, considered a class enemy by the communist authorities. Celebration of this date was illegal in Poland and always a cause for concern by the police and the SB.

Around 3 p.m., Grzegorz Przemyk and his friends, Cezary Filozof, Piotr Kadlčik, Igor Bieliński, and Kuba Kotański, left together to celebrate their graduation at Castle Square in Warsaw's Old Town. Przemyk jumped on the shoulders of the much shorter Filozof, and they both fell onto the sidewalk after taking a few steps. This attracted the attention of a nearby police car and ZOMO officers. Shortly after, Filozof and Przemyk were stopped by the policeman Ireneusz Kościuk, who demanded their identity documents. As they denied, Kościuk called for a police car and forced them inside while beating them with a rubber baton. Kuba and Piotr, who witnessed the events from distance, separated. Piotr ran home to notify Przemyk's mother, and Kotański followed the car to a nearby police station. Standing outside, he heard Przemyk howling in pain as he was being beaten. Filozof was with Przemyk the whole time and witnessed two policemen, Kościuk and Krzysztof Dalmata, beating him with a baton. Arkadiusz Denkiewicz, who was the duty officer at the time, came to the room and complained about the noise, instructing them to beat Przemyk more quietly, preferably in the stomach. Dalmata then held Przemyk's arms behind his back, while Bogusław Bielec struck him in the stomach with his elbow until Przemyk fell unconscious.

The policemen called an ambulance around 6 p.m., reporting that a "drug addict" required treatment at a psychiatric hospital. They said that Przemyk was feigning illness in order to leave the police station. The driver, Michał Wysocki, could see that Przemyk was not drugged, but crouching, holding his stomach, and unable to walk. Together with the paramedic Jacek Szyzdek, they moved him into the ambulance and transported him to a hospital on Hoża Street. By that time, Filozof had arrived at the hospital on foot from the police station. The psychiatrist Paweł Willmann then referred the barely conscious Przemyk to a psychiatric hospital for further investigation, explaining that a gastric lavage would be performed and he would "soon get better." Przemyk's mother arrived and insisted on taking him home, fearing abuse known to be typical at the psychiatric facilities at that time. At home, Przemyk, feeling better, relayed how he was beaten by the policemen, while an officer advised that they "beat him in the stomach to leave no traces".

On 13 May, Przemyk again started feeling poorly and was seen by two doctors. The second one suspected liver injury and called for immediate transport to Solec hospital for surgery. At 11 pm, Przemyk was still conscious and explained to the surgeon he had been "beaten in the stomach until he lost consciousness" and that it happened at a police station. He was operated on during the night, only to confirm severe and irreversible gastrointestinal perforation. Przemyk died in an intensive care unit at 1 pm on 14 May. The news about his death quickly spread, and by the evening Sadowska's house was already guarded by a number of policemen, preventing friends arriving with condolences from entering.

On 15 May, the information reached the underground and international media (BBC, RFE, and Voice of America), but was not reported in the Polish media. The opposition writer and poet Wiktor Woroszylski wrote an open letter to Prime Minister Mieczysław Rakowski calling for a fair and transparent investigation. Rakowski noted in his private diary that, taking into account the activities of Sadowska, the security service might have "taught her son a lesson." The opinion that the incident was the SB's revenge on Sadowska was also widespread in opposition circles at that time.

On 17 May, the state newspaper Życie Warszawy published a short note about "two drunk and aggressive men" found by police officers on the square that required an ambulance because they "had injuries." The note did not mention their arrest and detention at the police station. Cezary Filozof went into hiding because it became obvious the investigation would be manipulated and he was the most important witness to the beating.

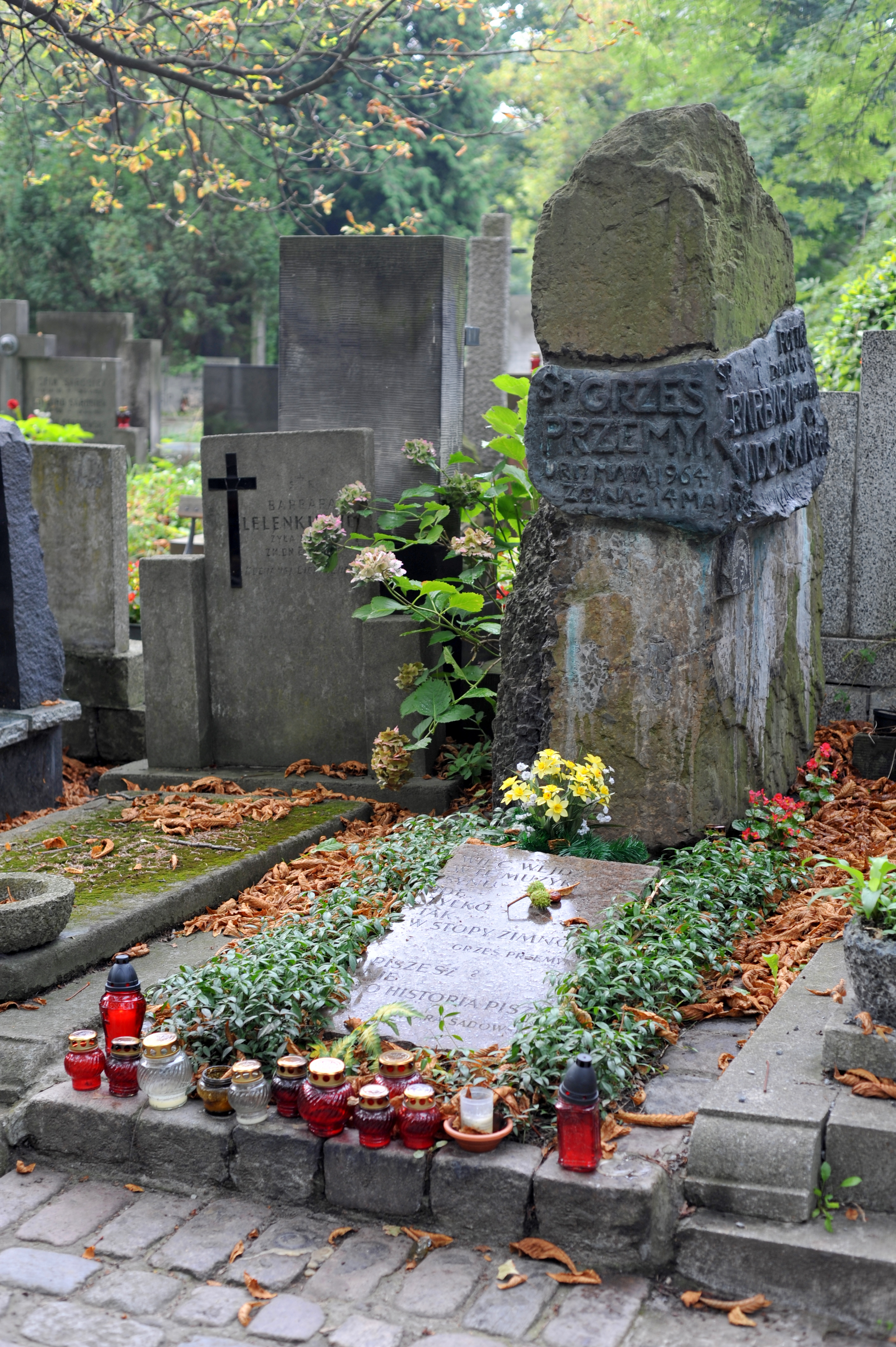
Grave of Grzegorz Przemyk at Powązki Cemetery in Warsaw.

Przemyk's funeral on 19 May, which took place at Powązki Cemetery, and which was officiated by Jerzy Popiełuszko, turned into a spontaneous demonstration against the communist regime, attended by 20,000 to 60,000 people marching in silence.

== Cover-up operation ==
On 20 May, at Ministry of Internal Affairs, the minister Czesław Kiszczak held a closed meeting to plan the government's response to the scandal. One of the officers, Romuald Zajkowski, presented results of an internal investigation concluding that this is "a purely criminal case rather than a political one", which may lead to "conviction of a few sadists in the police force" at worst, suggesting a regular investigation by law enforcement institutions.

This was however fiercely protested by general Józef Beim, head of the police, who did not agree to "sacrifice his men". Shortly after, Kiszczak decided that the investigation must be controlled and lead to conviction of the paramedics, while policemen should not even appear as suspects. Prosecutor general Franciszek Rusak, however, published a note in Życie Warszawy mentioning the start of an investigation to "determine the mechanism of injuries" Przemyk suffered. This caused a very aggressive reaction from Kiszczak and his deputy Władysław Ciastoń, who threatened Rusak and requested that their version be presented from the very beginning.

Having read the note, Cezary Filozof reported himself to the prosecutor's office on 23 May and produced a detailed witness statement, which was fully consistent with the forensic pathology reports already received by Rusak. On 24 May a meeting was held at the Polish United Workers' Party central with the prime minister, ministers and other key figures where a strategy of dealing with the upcoming scandal was discussed. Jerzy Urban advised the case needed to be carefully handled to avoid turning Przemyk into a "martyr". He suggested covering it up with publication of possibly compromising wiretaps of Lech Wałęsa thus weakening the strong opinions about police brutality, and by promoting the doctors' possible culpability. He also suggested suspending the two policemen responsible, so as to calm the situation. This was again met with a very aggressive response from Kiszczak. Eventually, the Party issued a statement "fully supporting" the Interior Ministry in the rise of "opposition's unprecedented attacks". Wojciech Jaruzelski explained to Rakowski that Przemyk was a drug-addict.

Over the coming months the Citizens' Militia and the SB Service rolled out a full-scale operation involving pressuring witnesses as well as prosecutors, collecting and publishing compromising information about Przemyk, his family and friends, using wiretaps, active measures, harassment, silent calls, confidential informers etc. These steps were suggested by two professors, Włodzimierz Szewczuk and Józef Borgosz, who consulted for the security service. They also invented a karate fight between Przemyk and Filozof, which was promoted for a while to compromise the statement of Kuba Kotański, implying the agonized screams of Przemyk where really "karate screams".

On 30 June, the prosecution, after completing most medical analyses and witness interviews, planned to reveal indictments against the two policemen, Ireneusz Kościuk and Arkadiusz Denkiewicz (beating to death) and two doctors Bronisław Jasicki and Paweł Willmann (medical negligence). Paramedics Michał Wysocki and Jacek Szyzdek were also suspected of possibly beating Przemyk in the ambulance or lift, but on 4 July these versions were determined to be impossible after an investigation. In none of the locations was there sufficient space to apply sufficient force to cause the injuries suffered by Przemyk, and there were no witnesses of any misconduct by the paramedics.

On 6 July, the SB succeeded in transferring the investigation from the district prosecutor's office to the regional office, where prosecutor Anna Jackowska was assigned and supervised by pl:Wiesława Bardonowa, well known for her compliance with SB needs in political trials and anti-opposition bias. Deputy prosecutor general Henryk Pracki, however, still wanted to include witness statement by Cezary Filozof as it considered it to be logical and consistent with other evidence. Pressure from Kiszczak on Pracki continued during numerous other high-level meetings with the Party leadership.

Selecting the paramedics' misconduct as primary cover-up version, SB launched a country-wide campaign against general ambulance personnel and paramedics, highlighting real and invented cases of negligence or petty theft against patients. This prepared the ground for arrest of Wysocki and Szyzdek. At the same time SB intensified pressure on the family of Cezary Filozof, threatening his parents and relatives with tax-evasion investigations, termination of employment and closing their small businesses. As part of the pressure, pl:Maciej Bednarkiewicz, the lawyer representing Sadowska, was arrested in unrelated and fabricated case. SB also forced early retirement of another lawyer involved, pl:Władysław Siła-Nowicki, as well as the prosecutor Henryk Pracki.

SB also cooperated with Ministry of Defence to force conscription of Cezary Filozof with the intent to isolate him from the investigation and possibly silence him with an accident during military training. Filozof was under permanent surveillance with over 240 officers involved in discrediting him. The group operated on the orders of chief of police general Józef Beim, coordinated by captain Zdzisław Chwaszcz. 12 friends and relatives of Filozof were recruited as informants. Similar measures were applied to Barbara Sadowska. Both, however, held to their witness statements. Paramedics Wysocki and Szyzdek were eventually arrested for fabricated crimes and SB continued to pressure them into confession while in detention. SB officer Jacek Ziółkowski, personally Wysocki's friend, manipulated him into confession, threatening his children.

In November, another forensic pathology opinion is produced by professor Zdzisław Marek which confirmed, in spite of pressure from SB, that Przemyk could have been beaten only at the police station, which further weakened the version of events promoted by the authorities. Their witness statements also barely confirmed any use of force by paramedics or doctors and Wysocki's behavior while interviewed by the prosecutor gave reason to believe the confession was extorted, as it is completely inconsistent with forensic evidence.

== Trial ==
In December, the indictment was ready to be passed to the court for trial. SB, however, disputed it and managed to soften some of the claims, criticising the prosecution for "still believing that Przemyk was beaten at the police station". In April 1984, prosecutor Rusek was replaced by Józef Żyta, who vigorously proceeded to remove traces of Kościuk and Denkiewicz from the indictment. To that end, officer Stanisław Wyciszczak was assigned to devise every possible argument to present the most damning witness statements of Filozof and Kotański as unreliable. The forensic evidence, however, was still there, as the experts refused to modify it to suit the police's version.

Kiszczak made one more attempt to pressure prosecutor Gonciarz to remove the policemen from the indictment, which he refused to do and resigned from his position in protest. As result, the indictment was left unsigned, and thus formally incomplete. As a workaround, an unrelated prosecutor Anna Jackowska signed it after changing the qualification of policemen's actions to simple "beating" while the paramedics were indicted of the much more serious "fatal beating". The two doctors were previously indicted for "negligence".

The trial started on 31 May and attracted broad attention of international media, but was only briefly reported on Polish TV. On the first day Barbara Sadowska resigned from her role of subsidiary prosecutor in protest of the biased indictment. Wysocki withdrew his previous confession during the trial, but Szyzdek maintained it. Kościuk and Denkiewicz pleaded not guilty and refused any further explanations. Witnesses Filozof and Kotański held their statements of the beating they had witnessed at the police station. Forensic expert Zdzisław Marek also held his opinion that Przemyk acquired his fatal injuries at the police station.

A number of witnesses, including doctors, paramedics, and Przemyk's friends independently confirmed that immediately after the incident Przemyk said he was beaten by policemen. Each of these was however "balanced" by statements of large number of policemen, both related and unrelated to the case, repeating identical statements about "karate screams" and "suspect behavior" of Przemyk's group at the Square. Two unrelated prison doctors, Józef Mielczarek and Stanisław Krzak, were called to testify as medical experts and presented fantastic theories about mental disorders Przemyk must have suffered which, as they claimed, were proven by the fact that he initially denied giving his documents to policemen when ordered. As noted by many witnesses, during the whole trial prosecutor Bardonowa behaved in a way that has been described as "being the most dedicated defender of the suspected policemen, while taking any attempt to prosecute the victims".

On 9 July, Szyzdek unexpectedly withdrew his confession about Wysocki beating Przemyk. Nevertheless, on 10 July, prosecutor Bardonowa delivered her final speech, repeating all the statements supporting official versions, withdrawn or otherwise, and ignoring witness statements by Filozof, Kotański and the forensic experts.

On 16 July, Judges Janusz Jankowski, Andrzej Lewandowski and Ewa Gutowska-Sawczuk acquitted Kościuk and Denkiewicz. The doctors Jasicki and Willman were considered guilty of non-intentional negligence, and remitted. The paramedics were the only ones convicted to 2 years in prison for the "brutal treatment of the patient". But after about a month, they were silently amnestied and released. They lost their jobs, however, and suffered from depression in the aftermath. Their convictions were rendered invalid in 1989 after the fall of communist regime

== Relationship with Popiełuszko murder ==
Shortly after, in October 1984, priest Jerzy Popiełuszko was murdered by Grzegorz Piotrowski, an officer of the SB Secret Service. Mieczysław Rakowski made a note in his personal diary on that subject that the acquittal of the policemen "might have only encouraged Piotrowski and his friends".

== Repeated investigations and trial at the Institute of National Remembrance ==
Przemyk's investigation was restarted in 1993 after the fall of communism with his father Leopold Przemyk as subsidiary prosecutor. The case against the policemen dragged on for years and in 2010, after a number of appeals, it was eventually remitted due to expiration, leaving Arkadiusz Denkiewicz as the only convict. Leopold Przemyk filed a case then with European Court of Human Rights, which in 2013 decided that none of the Poland's investigations in this case were intentionally delayed. In 1998, another investigation against Czesław Kiszczak was started by the Institute of National Remembrance for interfering with the original investigation from 1983. This prosecution collected a large amount of evidence, but the case was also eventually remitted in 2012 after years of legal battles.

Przemyk's funeral

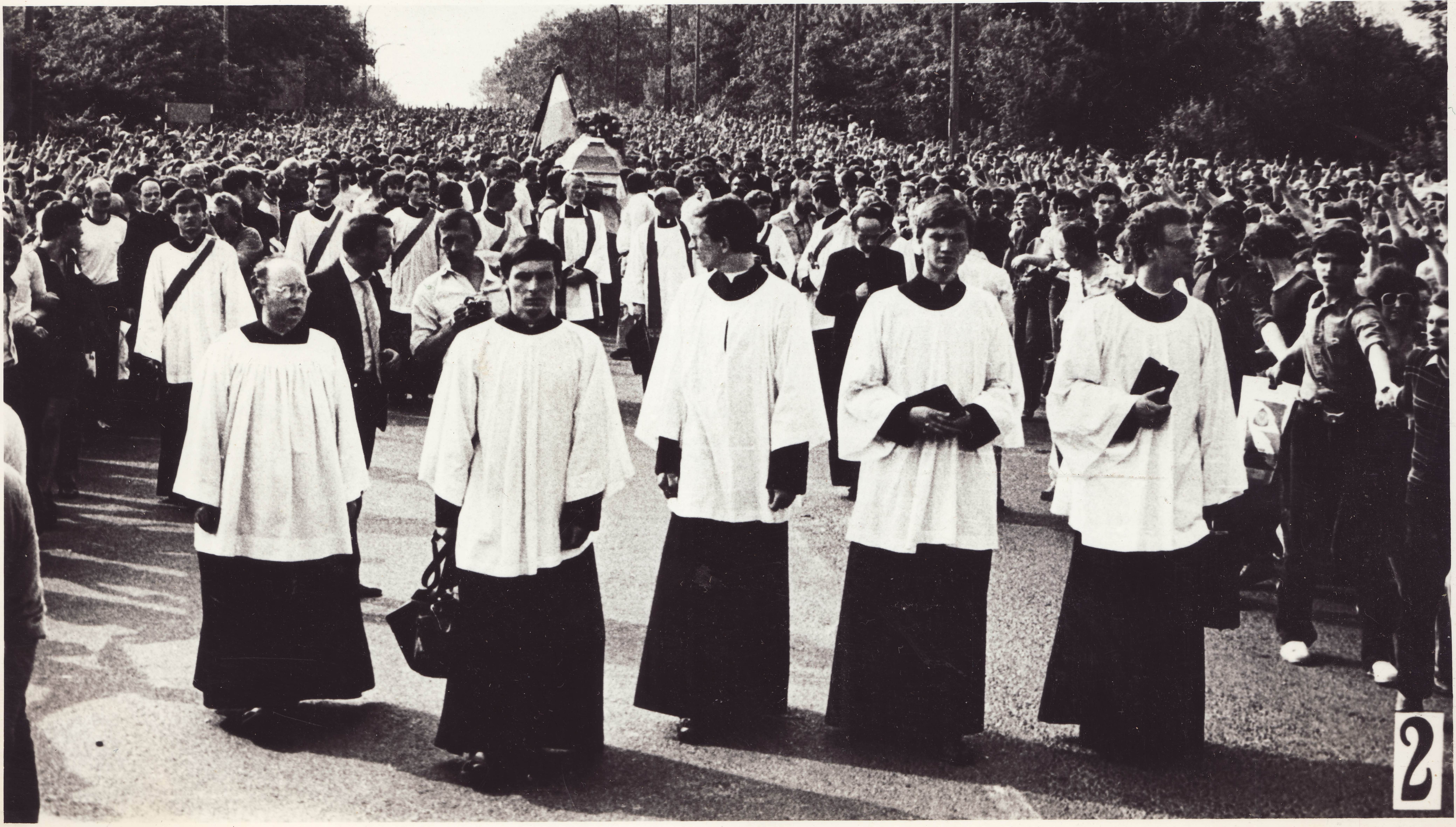
Funeral procession

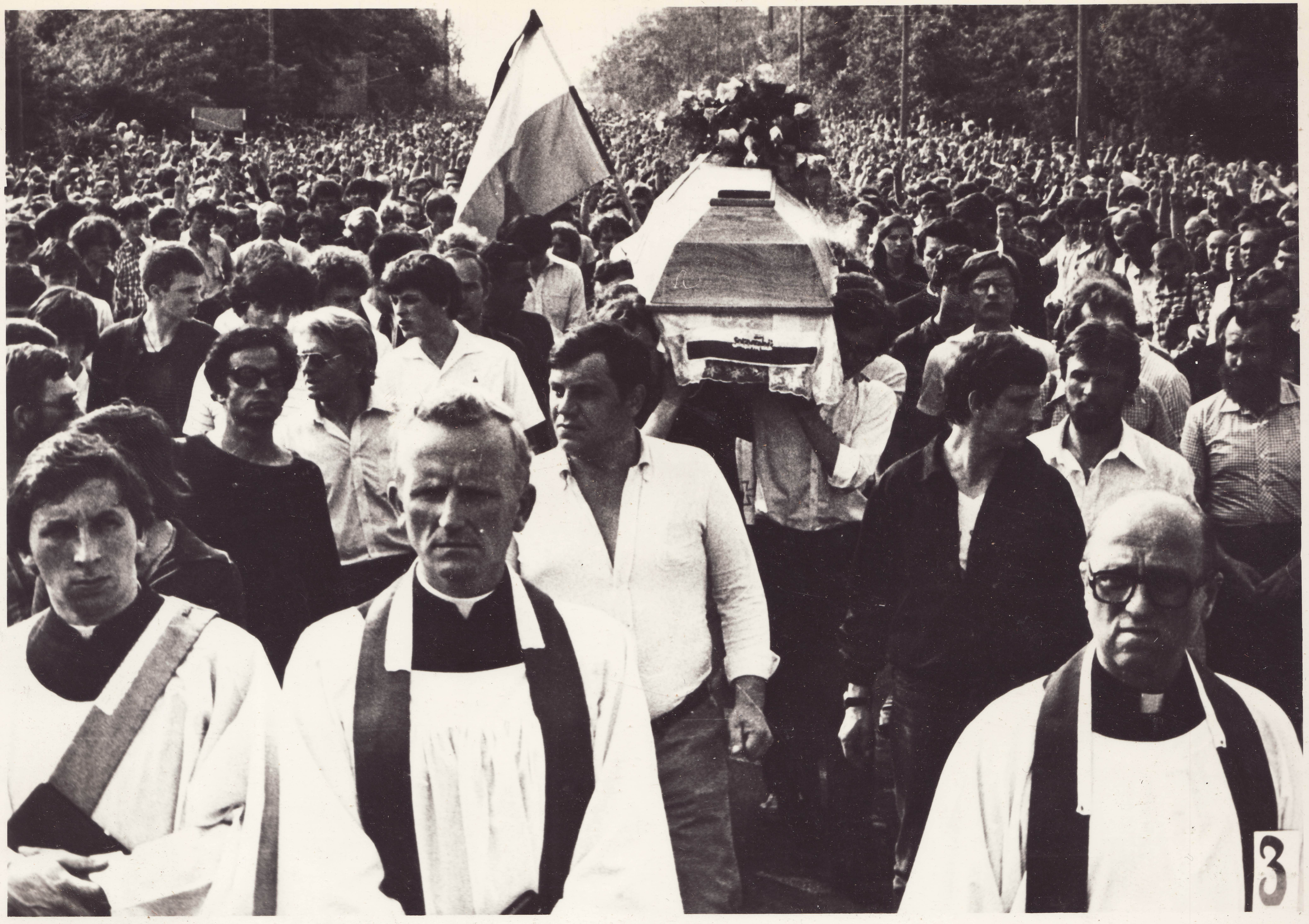
Jan Sikorski (center)

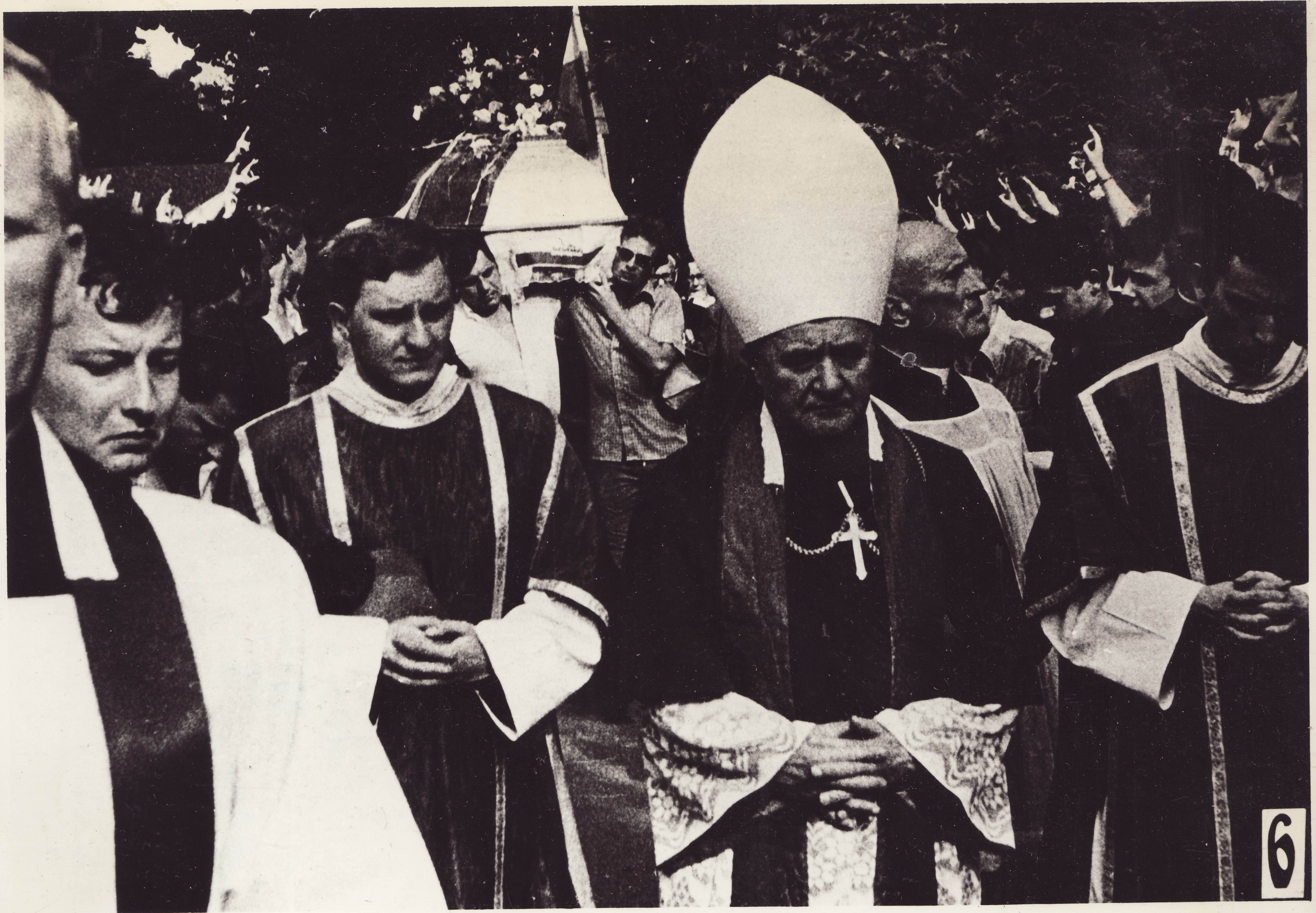
Bishop Władysław Miziołek

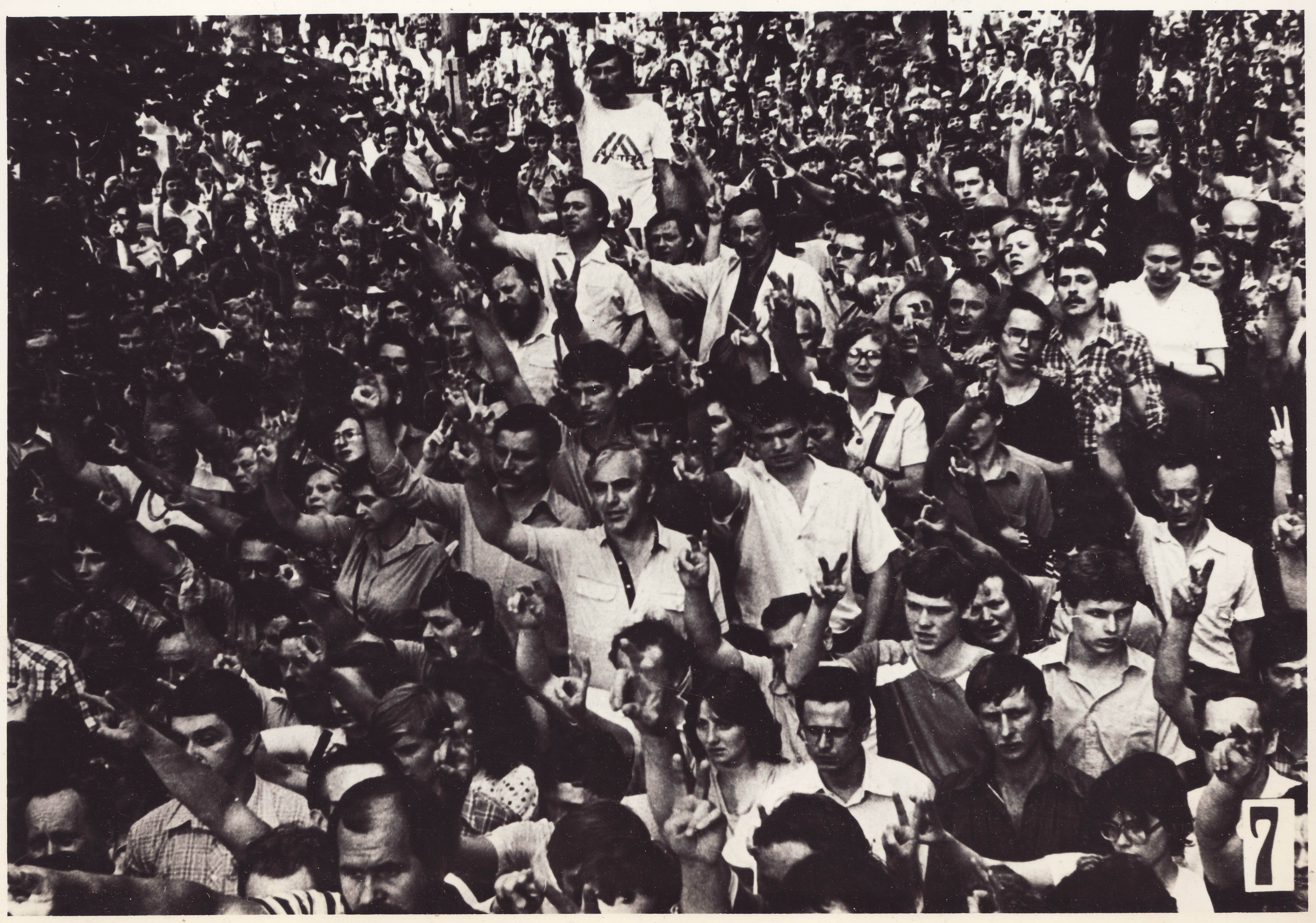
Funeral procession

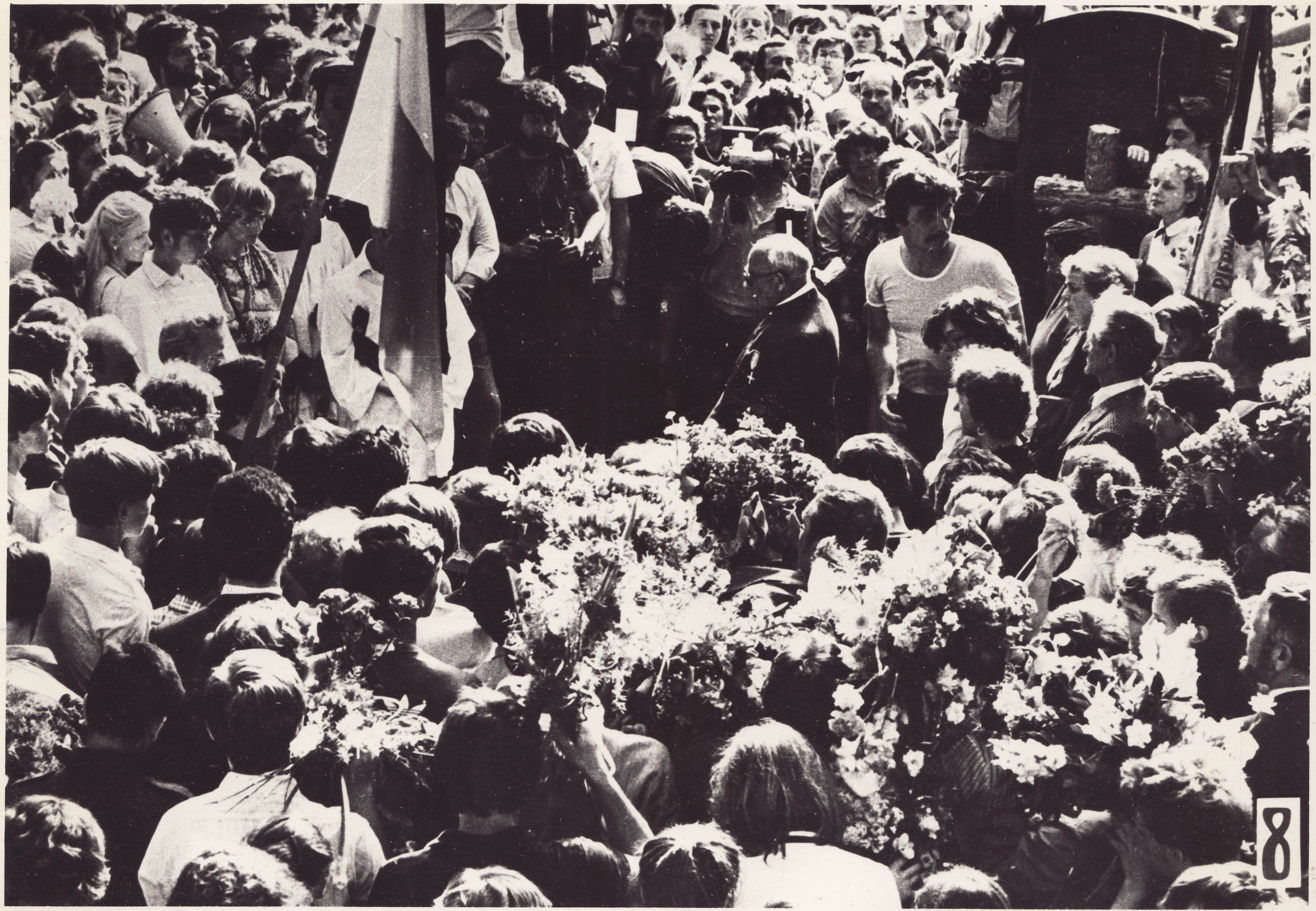
Funeral

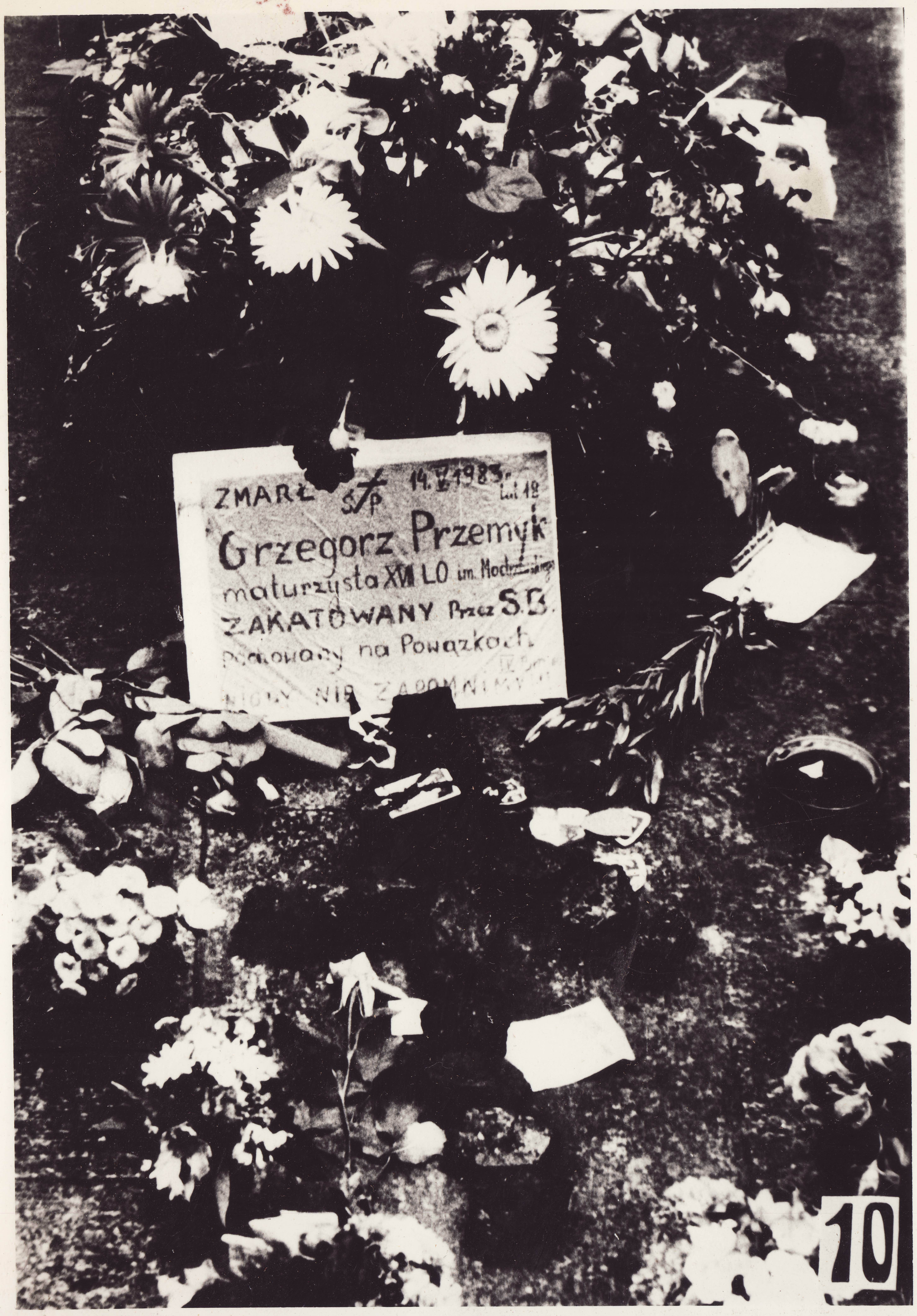
Grave

== Legacy ==
On 3 May 2008 Przemyk was posthumously awarded the Knight's Cross of the Order of Polonia Restituta, by the late President of Poland, Lech Kaczyński.

The song "Over My Dead Body" from the 1984 album "Meltdown" from Christian recording artist Steve Taylor was dedicated to the memory of Grzegorz Przemyk.

In 2018, Polish President Andrzej Duda laid a wreath at the memorial for Przemyk at the XVII Modrzewski High School, which Przemyk attended before his death.

A film about Przemyk's death, Leave No Traces, was released on 21 September 2021.
