= Diagnosis (Polish TV series) =

- Genre: Medical drama, Thriller
- Starring: Maja Ostaszewska; Maciej Zakościelny; Adam Woronowicz; Magdalena Popławska; Aleksandra Konieczna; Michał Czernecki; Sonia Bohosiewicz; Anna Smołowik; Beata Ścibakówna; Tomasz Drabek; Antoni Królikowski; Aleksandra Adamska; Józef Pawłowski
- Opening theme: "The Bird's Song" by MaJLo
- Composer: Łukasz Targosz
- Country of origin: Poland
- Original language: Polish
- No. of series: 4
- No. of episodes: 52

Production
- Executive producer: Dagmara Bończyk
- Producer: Dorota Kośmicka-Gacke
- Cinematography: Jeremi Prokopowicz (ep. 14–39) Krzysztof Mieszkowski (ep. 17–22, 25–39); Tomasz Naumiuk (ep. 1–13); Mateusz Wichłacz (ep. 7–13) Norbert Modrzejewski (ep. 18, 20–21)
- Running time: 43 minutes
- Production company: TVN

Original release
- Network: TVN
- Release: 5 September 2017 – present

Diagnosis (original title: Diagnoza) is a Polish thriller medical drama produced by TVN. The series stars Maja Ostaszewska as the main character and debuted on TVN on 5 September 2017. The second series premiered on 20 February 2018.

== Premise ==
The series follows Anna Nowak, who returns to the country after several years spent abroad and is determined to face the person who hurt her in the past. We meet Anna at Katowice Airport. First, she is driving to the Rybnik where lives someone important to her and then she is rushing to meet her lawyer in Warsaw. On her way from Rybnik, she suffers in a bus crash and is admitted to the hospital in the same city. Besides some minor injuries, she is diagnosed with amnesia. Anna is desperate to find out her identity and regain her memory with a help of the medical staff. One of them, though, seem to know her and tries to hide it. In each episode, another piece of her past is uncovered. The series features also stories of patients treated in the hospital as well as private lives of the staff.

== Cast and characters ==
- Maja Ostaszewska as Anna Nowak, the main character, a woman who loses her memory following a bus crash.
- Maciej Zakościelny as Michał Wolski, a surgeon working in hospital in Rybnik.
- Adam Woronowicz as Jan Artman, a surgeon in Rybnik hospital.
- Magdalena Popławska as Marta Artman, Jan's wife and neuropsychologist.
- Aleksandra Konieczna as Maria Kaleta, a medical director in Rybnik hospital.
- Michał Czernecki as Piotr Sadzik, an orthopaedist and ER director.
- Sonia Bohosiewicz as Wanda Jureczko, a nurse manager in the hospital.
- Anna Smołowik as Kaja Szewczyk, an internist in Rybnik hospital and Wolski's girlfriend.
- Beata Ścibakówna as Olga Bujak, an anaesthetist.
- Tomasz Drabek as Tomasz Wolski, a gynaecologist and Michał's brother.
- Antoni Królikowski as Kacper Kaleta, Maria's son and an intern in her hospital.
- Aleksandra Adamska as Dagmara Mazurek, an intern in Rybnik hospital.
- Józef Pawłowski as Rafał Krupniok, an intern in the hospital.

== Series overview ==
Series	Episodes	Originally released	
Series	Episodes	First released	Last released
1	13	5 September 2017	28 November 2017
2	13	20 February 2018	15 May 2018
3	13	4 September 2018	27 November 2018
4	15	26 February 2019	21 May 2019

== Production ==
In March 2017, it was first reported that TVN would produce and broadcast a television series set in Rybnik as part of a deal with the city. The series was expected to contain city placement and consist of at least 12 episodes with broadcast on a weekday at no earlier than 8 pm and the premiere date no later than October 2017. Rybnik demanded that the programme contained scenes featuring at least 36 popular locations in the city and that its name was mentioned at least 6 times. In the final agreement, estimated to 369,000 PLN, TVN was obliged to deliver 40 such scenes and 10 mentions of word "Rybnik". As part of the deal, it was also assumed that the cast would include famous and well-renowned actors.

The main cast and the title were revealed in April 2017. Filming began on 20 April 2017 and took place in Rybnik and Warsaw. It was also announced that Dorota Kośmicka-Gacke would be the series' producer and it would be directed by Xawery Żuławski and Łukasz Palkowski. Katarzyna Śliwińska-Kłosowicz would act as the head writer. It was reported that the series would contain 13 episodes, each lasting about 40 minutes.

Few weeks after the premiere, TVN confirmed that Diagnosis would be returning for a second series.

== Episodes ==
=== Series 1 ===
No.	Title	Directed by	Written by	Original release date	Poland viewers (millions)
1	"Episode 1"	Xawery Żuławski	Wojciech Lepianka	5 September 2017	1.97
2	"Episode 2"	Xawery Żuławski	Agnieszka Krzyt	12 September 2017	1.85
3	"Episode 3"	Xawery Żuławski	Tomasz Titkow	19 September 2017	2.06
4	"Episode 4"	Xawery Żuławski	Wojciech Lepianka	26 September 2017	2.09
5	"Episode 5"	Xawery Żuławski	Agnieszka Krzyt	3 October 2017	2.12
6	"Episode 6"	Xawery Żuławski	Tomasz Titkow	10 October 2017	2.18
7	"Episode 7"	Łukasz Palkowski	Wojciech Lepianka	17 October 2017	2.27
8	"Episode 8"	Łukasz Palkowski	Tomasz Titkow	24 October 2017	2.38
9	"Episode 9"	Łukasz Palkowski	Agnieszka Krzyt	31 October 2017	2.13
10	"Episode 10"	Łukasz Palkowski	Wojciech Lepianka	7 November 2017	2.48
11	"Episode 11"	Łukasz Palkowski	Tomasz Titkow	14 November 2017	2.39
12	"Episode 12"	Łukasz Palkowski	Agnieszka Krzyt	21 November 2017	2.58
13	"Episode 13"	Xawery Żuławski, Łukasz Palkowski	Tomasz Titkow	28 November 2017	2.69

=== Series 2 ===
No.	Title	Directed by	Written by	Original release date	Poland viewers (millions)
14	"Episode 01/II"	Łukasz Palkowski	Wojciech Lepianka	20 February 2018	2.27
15	"Episode 02/II"	Łukasz Palkowski	Dana Łukasińska	27 February 2018	2.09
16	"Episode 03/II"	Łukasz Palkowski	Wojciech Lepianka	6 March 2018	2.14
17	"Episode 04/II"	Łukasz Palkowski	Tomasz Titkow	13 March 2018	N/A
18	"Episode 05/II"	Łukasz Palkowski	Dana Łukasińska	20 March 2018	N/A
19	"Episode 06/II"	Łukasz Palkowski	Tomasz Titkow	27 March 2018	N/A
20	"Episode 07/II"	Łukasz Palkowski	Dana Łukasińska	3 April 2018	N/A
21	"Episode 08/II"	Łukasz Palkowski	Wojciech Lepianka	10 April 2018	N/A

== International broadcast ==
The series premiered in Ukraine on 11 December 2017 on 1+1.
