= Sąd rejonowy =

Judiciary instance in Poland

The regional court (Polish: sąd rejonowy) is a type of a ordinary court in the judiciary system of Poland, that deals with a wide range of cases related to the scope of civil, criminal, family and guardianship, labour and social security and economic law. Since March 1, 2006, there have been 315 regional courts in Poland.

== Court's jurisdiction ==
It is the court of first instance for all contravention charges, the majority of misdemeanor indictments and low-value lawsuits, with its verdicts normally subject to appeal to a sąd okręgowy (a circuit court) covering the area in which the sąd rejonowy court is located.

However, the most complex, prominent or high-value cases are heard instead by a sąd okręgowy as the first instance court whose verdict may then be appealed to a sąd apelacyjny (an appeal court); these include:

- lawsuits claiming more than 75,000 PLN of worth, except for those concerning alimony, infringement on rights of possession, separation of property during divorces, challenging a land and mortgage register entry, as well as those filed using a simplified procedure of the electronic writ of payment (elektroniczne postępowanie upominawcze);
- lawsuits concerning personal rights (e.g. personality rights, right to privacy, defamation and freedom of conscience cases), except for parenthood and adoption cases;
- intellectual property laws lawsuits (but not indictments);
- maritime code lawsuits;
- press law lawsuits (but not indictments) concerning all media outlets; applications and complaints related to press outlets other than those covered by the broadcasting act, including their registration;
- personal data protection law lawsuits (but not indictments);
- complaints challenging the split of a cooperative;
- complaints challenging the existence, legality or legal effect of resolutions of legal persons and other entities with legal capacity;
- applications claiming damages for the effects of a legally valid and binding (non-appealable) court verdict;
- applications and complaints concerning incapacitation of a person;
- applications and complaints concerning imposition or termination of legal separation in a marriage;
- charges of submitting a false declaration with regard to lustration;
- indictments for serious crimes, including all crimes that carry a punishment of at least 3 years of imprisonment or more (zbrodnie or felonies); and selected other crimes (występki or misdemeanors) as specified in Article 25 of the Code of criminal procedure, e.g. those related to civil aviation accidents and serious incidents;
- lawsuits referred from a sąd rejonowy for trial in a circuit court (may be remanded back to sąd rejonowy, with justification), and indictments referred by the appeal court on a request of a sąd rejonowy (may not be remanded)

== Formation, abolition and distribution ==
Such courts are established and abolished through a regulation of the Minister of Justice in consultation with the National Council of the Judiciary. Usually, a single sąd rejonowy is established to have jurisdiction over a court district (Polish: rejon sądowy) composed of one or more communes and usually a size of a county; nevertheless, the borders of these districts do not match in most cases the ones of the counties. Moreover, under justified circumstances (usually in cases of the biggest cities), more than one sąd rejonowy may be established to have jurisdiction over parts of a single commune.

== Structure ==
Each court is composed of divisions (depending on the needs) as follows:

- civil division,
- criminal (penal) division,
- family and minors division,
- land and mortgage register division (selected courts),
- labour and social insurance division (only in the courts located in the cities where an upper-level sąd okręgowy with a labour and social insurance division is also located)
- commercial division (only in the courts located in the cities where an upper-level sąd okręgowy is also located)

The Minister of Justice may create through a regulation a local branch division of a sąd rejonowy, located outside the main seat of the court and based in an other town.

== See also ==
- Judiciary of Poland
