= Jakub Żulczyk =

Polish writer and journalist

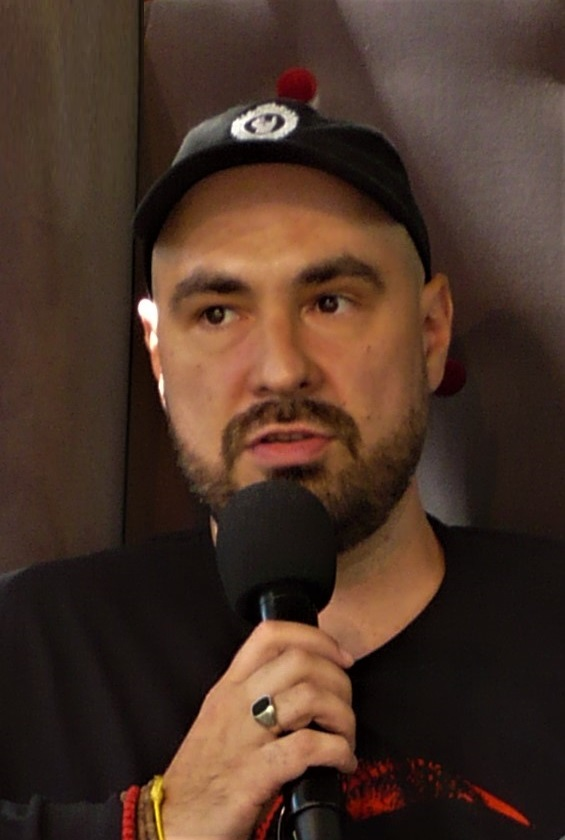
- Jakub Żulczyk in 2022
- Born: 12 August 1983 (age 43); Szczytno, Poland
- Education: Jagiellonian University
- Occupations: Author, journalist, screenwriter
- Writing career
- Language: Polish
- Notable works: Institute; Blinded by the Lights; The Hill of Dogs

Jakub Żulczyk (born 12 August 1983) is a Polish writer and journalist who writes for Elle, Machina, Przekrój and Onet.pl. He lives in Warsaw.

== Life and career ==
Żulczyk was born in Szczytno, Poland. He graduated in journalism from the Jagiellonian University. He publishes articles in such literary magazines as Lampa and Machina. He has also worked as a columnist for the Dziennik newspaper as well as Tygodnik Powszechny and Wprost.

In 2011, he was a co-host of the Redakcja kultury programme broadcast on TVP2 channel. He also worked as a host together with rapper Sokół of the Instytut prosto programme on Roxy Radio.

Żulczyk and Monika Powalisz wrote the script to the popular crime TV series Belfer.

His first book Zrób mi jakąś krzywdę... was published in 2006. He was nominated to the Paszport Polityki Award in 2014 for Ślepnąc od świateł ("Blinded by the Lights") and to the Literary Award of Warmia and Masuria in 2017. He is the winner of the 2018 Literary Award of the Capital City of Warsaw.

His 2022 novel Informacja zwrotna was adapted into a Netflix television series called Feedback.

=== Legal case ===
On 23 March 2021, Żulczyk was charged under the Polish lèse-majesté law, Article 135 of the Penal Code, for referring to Polish president Andrzej Duda as a "moron" (Polish: debil) in online social media in the context of comments criticising Duda's description of the 2020 United States presidential election victory of Joe Biden. Żulczyk risked three years' imprisonment under the law, which the Polish Constitutional Tribunal judged to be constitutionally and internationally valid, arguing that the effective carrying out of the duties of the president requires having authority and being especially respected. On 10 January 2022 the District Court in Warsaw discontinued the proceedings, arguing its decision with "negligible social harmfulness of the act".

== See also ==
- Polish literature

== Bibliography ==
- 2006 – Zrób mi jakąś krzywdę... czyli wszystkie gry video są o miłości
- 2008 – Radio Armageddon
- 2010 – Instytut
- 2011 – Zmorojewo
- 2011 – Świątynia
- 2014 – Ślepnąc od świateł
- 2017 – Wzgórze psów
- 2019 – Czarne Słońce
- 2021 – Informacja zwrotna
