= Player (streaming service) =

Polish video on demand service

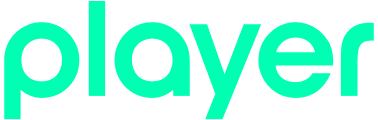
- Available in: Polish
- Founded: 26 August 2011
- Predecessor: tvn player
- Country of origin: Poland
- Owner: TVN Group
- Website: player.pl
- Users: 1.5 million

Player.pl or simply Player (formerly: tvn player) is a Polish video on demand and streaming television service launched on 26 August 2011.

The service offers programmes from TVN Warner Bros. Discovery (TVN, TVN 7, TVN Style, TVN Turbo, TVN24, TVN24 BiS, TTV), as well as external partners, including: Canal+, and HBO, Eleven Sports. The service is available through the website and through apps available on Android, Android TV, iOS, Orsay, PlayStation 4, VIDAA, Tizen, tvOS, and webOS.

== Original programming ==
=== Drama ===
- The Defence (2018–2022)
- Motive (2019–2020)
- Angel of Death (2020–2022)
- The Elements of Sasza – Fire (2020)
- Nieobecni (2020–2022)
- 25 Years of Innocence (2021)
- The Convict (2021–)
- Spider's Web (2021)
- Kontrola (2021–2022)
- Tajemnica zawodowa (2021–2022)
- The Behaviorist (2022)
- Pati (2023)

=== Comedy ===
- Web Therapy (2015)
- Mamy to (2021)
- Misja (2021)
- My Agent (2022–)
- Camera Cafe (2023)
