= Kornelia Strzelecka =

Polish actress and model (born 1993)

- Born: 22 April 1993 (age 33); Szczecin, Poland
- Education: Ruskin School of Acting
- Occupations: Actress; Model
- Years active: 2007 – present

Kornelia Strzelecka (Polish: [kɔrˈnɛl.ja stʂɛˈlɛt͡s.ka]; born 22 April 1993) is a Polish film and television actress and model. She is based in Warsaw, Poland, and Los Angeles, United States. Strzelecka is best known for the role of Asia Kasprzyk, one of the main characters of the Canal+ mockumentary sitcom The Office PL (2021–2024). She also portrayed Malina in the 2021 erotic drama film Girls to Buy, and Magda in the 2022 drama film Into the Wind, and also appeared in the television series FBI: International (2022), Father Matthew (2023), We Were the Lucky Ones (2024), and The Thaw (2025).

== Biography ==
Kornelia Strzelecka was born on 22 April 1993 in Szczecin, Poland. She began studying law at the Jagiellonian University in Kraków, but did not graduate. She later graduated from the Ruskin School of Acting in Santa Monica, California, and continued practising her acting skills at the Margie Haber Studio and the Ivana Chubbuck Studio in Los Angeles.

Strzelecka began working as a model at the age of fourteen for Warsaw-based agency Rebel Models, and later for NEXT Model Management. She took part in add campaigns for stores Le Bon Marché, Galeries Lafayette, Prada, and Reserved. Her photographs were published in magazines such as Elle, Harper's Bazaar, Interview, Teen Vogue, and Vogue.

In 2020, was an assistant director for the 2020 crime Western film Magnesium, and in the Player comedy crime series Królestwo kobiet. She also had her acting debut on screen with a small role in said television series. In 2021, Strzelecka was cast as Asia Kasprzyk, one of the main characters of the Canal+ mockumentary sitcom The Office PL (2021–2024). She also portrayed Malina in the 2021 erotic drama film Girls to Buy, and Magda in the 2022 drama film Into the Wind. Strzelecka also appeared in the television series FBI: International (2022), Father Matthew (2023), Lipowo. Zmowa milczenia (2023), Crusade (2024), We Were the Lucky Ones (2024), and The Thaw (2025). In 2024, she portrayed Klaudia in the play Klub Niepokonanych in theatre Garizon Sztuki in Warsaw, written by Joanna Kowalska, and directed by Piotr Ratajczak.

== Personal life ==
Strzelecka resides in Warsaw, Poland, and Los Angeles, United States. She practices karate, and used to be a martial arts teacher in Los Angeles.

== Filmography ==
=== Films ===
Year	Title	Role	Notes	Ref.
2020	Magnesium	—N/a	Feature film; assistant director	
2021	Girls to Buy	Malina	Feature film; also contributions to the script	
2022	Into the Wind	Magda	Feature film	
2023	Tokyo Tea Tango	Woman	Short film	

=== Television series ===
Year	Title	Role	Notes	Ref.
2020	Królestwo kobiet	Kiki	Episode no. 3; also assistant director for 5 episodes, and second director for 3 episodes	
2021–2024	The Office PL	Asia Kasprzyk	Main role; 48 episodes	
2022	FBI: International	Nadia Balan	Episode: "Yesterday's Miracle"	
2023	Father Matthew	Nun Marta	Episode: "Sąd ostateczny"	
2023	Lipowo. Zmowa milczenia	Sarenka	2 episodes	
2024	Crusade	Weronika	2 episodes	
2024	We Were the Lucky Ones	Renia	Episode: "Warsaw"	
2025	The Thaw	Journalist	Episode no. 16	

=== Audio plays ===
Year	Title	Role
2022	Projekt Riese	Natasza Szatecka
2023	Langer	Young Chyłka
2024	Operacja Mir	Natasza Szatecka

== Theatre credits ==
Year	Title	Role	Director	Theatre	Ref.
2024	Klub Niepokonanych	Klaudia	Piotr Ratajczak	Garnizon Sztuki, Warsaw	
