= Absolute Beginners =

Absolute Beginners may refer to:

- Absolute Beginners (novel), a 1959 novel by Colin MacInnes
  - Absolute Beginners (film), a 1986 rock musical film based on the novel
  - Absolute Beginners: The Original Motion Picture Soundtrack, the soundtrack album to the 1986 film Absolute Beginners
    - "Absolute Beginners" (David Bowie song), a 1986 single by David Bowie, title song from the above film
- Absolute Beginners (TV series), a 2023 Polish television series
- Absolute Beginners, a play written by Trevor Griffiths for the 1974 television series Fall of Eagles
- "Absolute Beginners" (The Jam song), a 1981 single by The Jam

== See also ==
- Beginner (band), the German rap group formerly known as 'Absolute Beginner'
