= Marta Mazurek =

Polish film actress (born 1990)

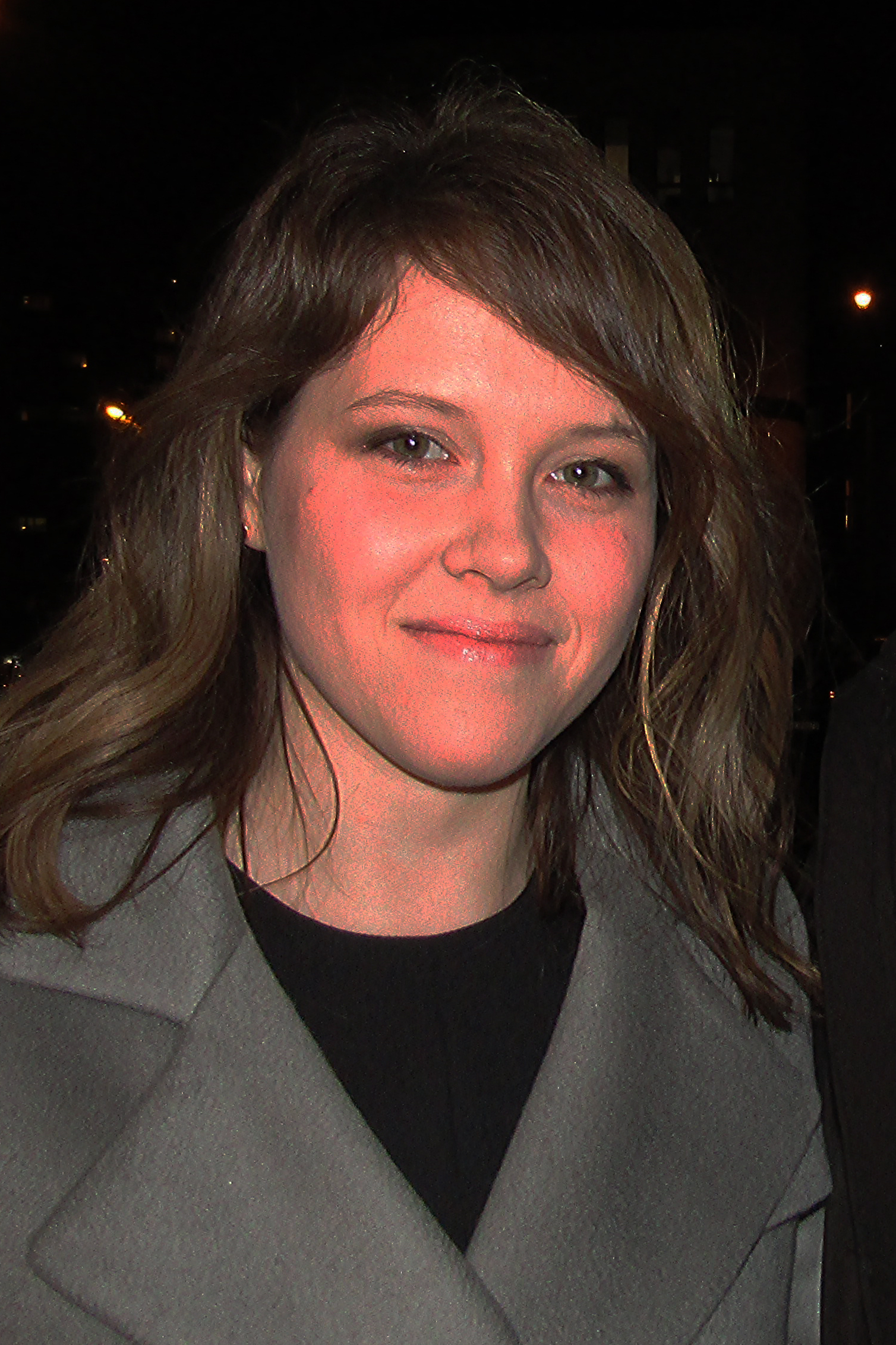
Marta Mazurek

Marta Mazurek (born 26 June 1990) is a Polish film actress. She made her debut role performance in the Gabriela Zapolska's play Ich czworo (Four of them) in 2012 directed for Radio Kraków by Jerzy Stuhr.

== Career ==
Mazurek was born on 26 June 1990 in Poznań. In 2013, while still being an acting student at the Krakow National Theatre School, she won the Grand Prix "for outstanding stage personality" at the Theatre Schools Festival in Łódź for her role in "The man who mistook his wife for a hat" (Mężczyzna, który pomylił swoją żonę z kapeluszem), directed by Krzysztof Globisz. During the same festival she also received an award from Association of Polish Artists. During the studies she performed in the music show Niech no tylko zakwitną jabłonie (Just let apple trees bloom) based on a screenplay by Agnieszka Osiecka. She graduated from theater school in 2014.

She appeared in television series and films, such as Siła wyższa (Force Majeure), Ranczo (The Ranch), Obywatel (The Citizen) and Warsaw by night. In 2015, she starred in the film The Lure directed by Agnieszka Smoczyńska.

== Filmography ==
=== Television ===
- 2011: Ranczo as Julia Wargaczówna (directed by Wojciech Adamczyk)
- 2011: Siła wyższa as Ala Malicka (directed by Wojciech Adamczyk)
- 2014: Ojciec Mateusz as Ola (directed by Maciej Dejczer, Andrzej Kostenko, Maciej Dutkiewicz)
- 2014: Na krawędzi 2 as Krysia Murek (directed by Maciej Dutkiewicz)
- 2015: Prokurator as daughter of Proch (directed by Jacek Filipiak and Maciej Pieprzyca)
- 2017–present: Wojenne dziewczyny as Irena Szczęsna
- 2023–present: Feedback

=== Film ===
- 2014: Warsaw by night as Renata (directed by Natalia Koryncka-Gruz)
- 2014: Obywatel as Girl from Committee (directed by Jerzy Stuhr)
- 2014: Thumbs UP as Paula (directed by Stefan Łazarski)
- 2015: Circus Maximus as Marianna (directed by Bartosz Kulas, Marcin Starzecki)
- 2015: Córki Dancingu (Eng: The Lure as 'Srebrna' the Siren (directed by Agnieszka Smoczyńska)
- 2015: Ameryka as Anka (directed by Aleksandra Terpińska, Przemysław Krawczyk)
- 2015: Legendy Polskie as Marta, the pink journalist (directed by Tomasz Bagiński)
