= Katarzyna Gałązka =

Polish actress (born 1997)

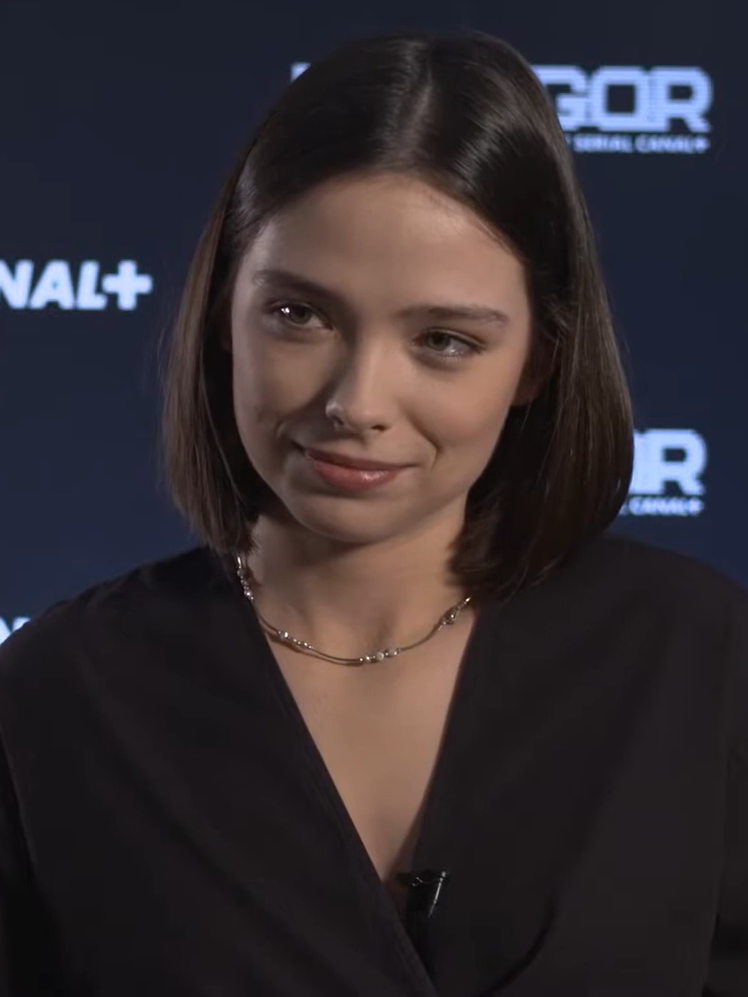
- Gałązka in 2021
- Born: 11 January 1997 (age 28); Ostrołęka, Poland
- Education: National Academy of Dramatic Art
- Occupation: Actress
- Years active: 2017–present

Katarzyna Gałązka (Polish pronunciation: [ka.taˈʐɘ.na ɡaˈwɔw̃s.ka]; born 11 January 1997) is a Polish actress.

== Biography ==
Gałązka was born in Ostrołęka, where she began acting at Klub Oczko and Ostrołęcka Scena Autorska. She graduated from the National Academy of Dramatic Art in 2020.

== Filmography ==
=== Film ===
Year	Title	Role	Ref.
2018	Autsajder	Bogusia	
2024	Supersiostry	Ala	

=== Television ===
Year	Title	Role	Notes	Ref.
2017	Lekarze na start	Olena	1 episode	
2018	Wartime Girls	Grażyna	1 episode	
2018	W rytmie serca	Janka	1 episode	
2018	Na dobre i na złe	Karolina	1 episode	
2019	Pułapka	Zosia	5 episodes	
2020	Młody Piłsudski	Wanda Krahelska	1 episode	
2020–2021	Lepsza połowa	Julia	19 episodes	
2021	Klangor	Hania Wejman	7 episodes	
2021	The Office PL	Marta Bielecka	2 episodes	
2022	Father Matthew	Marta Surmacz	1 episode	
2023	BringBackAlice	Monika Lenart	6 episodes	
2023	Morderczynie	Blanka	3 episodes	
2023	Lokatorka	Marta	2 episodes	
2024	Algorytm miłości	Sandra	9 episodes	
