= Joanna Drozda =

Polish actress (born 1980)

- Born: 8 November 1980 (age 45); Warsaw, Poland
- Education: National Academy of Theatre Arts
- Occupation: Actress
- Years active: 2004–present
- Spouse: Piotr Polak (m. 2008, sep.)
- Children: 1

Joanna Agnieszka Drozda (Note: Polish pronunciation: [jɔˈan.na aɡˈɲɛʂ.ka ˈdrɔz.da]) (born 8 November 1980; Polish: [ˈdrɔz.da]) is a Polish television, film, and stage actress, and theatre director and playwright. Drozda starred as Rosa, a main character in the 2020 drama film Hurrah, We Are Still Alive!, and Zofia Nałkowska, a secondary character in the 2022 thriller crime comedy film Dangerous Men. Drozda also portrayed Elwira Parchuć, a recurring character in the drama series Dom nad rozlewiskiem (2009), and its continuations, Miłość nad rozlewiskiem (2010), Życie nad rozlewiskiem (2011), Nad rozlewiskiem (2012), Cisza nad rozlewiskiem (2013–2014), and Pensjonat nad rozlewiskiem (2017–2018). She also starred in and directed numerous stage plays, and directed the 2020 mockumentary film Hallo Syrena, czyli premiera się odbędzie.

== Biography ==
Joanna Drozda was born on 8 November 1980 in Warsaw, Poland. She is the daughter of actor and comedian Tadeusz Drozda. She graduated from the Paseo Academy in Kansas City, Missouri, United States in 1998, and from the Faculty of Acting of the National Academy of Theatre Arts in Kraków, Poland in 2004. From 2004 to 2008, she performed at the Helena Modrzejewska National Old Theatre in Kraków, since then performing at the Gustaw Holobek Dramatic Theatre in Warsaw.

In 2006, Drozda wrote and directed a television play, titled Brzeg-Opole, in which she starred together with Marta Ojrzyńska for the Polish Television. She received an award for the best leading female actress for her performance in the play, at the Talia All-Polish Comedy Festival in Tarnów, and the first place award at the All-Polish Contest at the Polish Contemporary Art Exhibition, for the play and her performance. In 2009, she portrayed as Jola, a secondary character in the biographical drama film Popieluszko: Freedom Is Within Us. Drozda also portrayed Elwira Parchuć, a recurring character in the drama series Dom nad rozlewiskiem (2009), and its continuations, Miłość nad rozlewiskiem (2010), Życie nad rozlewiskiem (2011), Nad rozlewiskiem (2012), Cisza nad rozlewiskiem (2013–2014), and Pensjonat nad rozlewiskiem (2017–2018). She also starred as Joanna, a recurring character in the TVN drama series Na noże (2016), and appeared in television series such as Hotel 52 (2011), Recipe For Life (2013), Father Matthew (2013, 2015), Komisarz Alex (2017), Na dobre i na złe (2017), Our Century (2019), and Barwy szczęścia (2021). Drozda also starred as Rosa, a main character in the 2020 drama film Hurrah, We Are Still Alive!, and Zofia Nałkowska, a secondary character in the 2022 thriller crime comedy film Dangerous Men. She directed the 2020 mockumentary film Hallo Syrena, czyli premiera się odbędzie.

Drozda directed and wrote numerous plays, including Extravaganza o miłości (2015), Extravaganza o władzy (2017), and Extravaganza o religii (2022) at the Polish Theatre in Poznań, Nogi Syreny (2019), Morderca jest wśród nas (2019), Urodzony 22 lipca (2020), and Legendy warszawskie (2021) at the Syrena Theatre in Warsaw, Hotel Ritz. Musical (2022), and Serial Killer Story (2025) at the Białystok Puppet Theatre, and 40-latek (2023) at the Rampa Theatre in Tarnów.

== Private life ==
In 2008, Joanna Drozda married actor Piotr Polak, with whom she has a son, born in 2012. The couple has since separated. She is pansexual, and came out in 2022.

== Filmography ==
=== Films ===
Year	Title	Role	Notes
2006	Brzeg-Opole	Various roles	Television play; also playwright and director
2008	Mord założycielski	Helena "Lena" Wolińska	Television play
2009	Popieluszko: Freedom Is Within Us	Jola	Feature film
2012	It Looks Pretty from a Distance	Store cashier	Feature film
2013	10 apgar	Friend in the room	Short film
2013	Huba	Woman	Feature film
2015	America	Prostitute	Short film
2015	Tenants	Friend in the office	Short film
2016	Perseids	Ola	Short film
2016	Słońce, to słońce mnie oślepiło	Ola's sister	Short film
2017	Carousel	Kama	Short film
2017	Kontener	Maryna	Short film
2017	Wierność	Ilona	Short film
2018	Fascinatrix	Dorota/Staś	Short film
2019	My Heart	Rozia's friend	Short film
2020	Hallo Syrena, czyli premiera się odbędzie	Director	Feature film; also director
2020	Hurrah, We Are Still Alive!	Rosa	Feature film
2020	O jedno zdanie za dużo	Mother	Short film
2022	Dangerous Men	Zofia Nałkowska	Feature film

=== Television series ===
Year	Title	Role	Notes
2009	Dom nad rozlewiskiem	Elwira Parchuć	Recurring role; 10 episodes
2010	Miłość nad rozlewiskiem	Elwira Parchuć	Recurring role; 11 episodes
2011	Hotel 52	Mariola	Episode no. 28
2011	Życie nad rozlewiskiem	Elwira Parchuć	Recurring role; 13 episodes
2012	Father Matthew	Henryk's wife	Episode: "Komediant"
2012	Nad rozlewiskiem	Elwira Parchuć	Recurring episode; 11 episodes
2013	Popieluszko: Freedom Is Within Us	Jola	
2013	Recipe For Life	Woman	2 episodes
2013–2014	Cisza nad rozlewiskiem	Elwira Parchuć	Recurring role; 10 episodes
2015	Father Matthew	Krystyna Kasprzyk	Episode: "Geniusz"
2016	Na noże	Joanna	Recurring role; 10 episodes
2017	Komisarz Alex	Inga	Episode: "Podwójna śmierć"
2017	Na dobre i na złe	Jola Wolska	Episode: "Mistrz i uczeń"
2017–2018	Pensjonat nad rozlewiskiem	Elwira Parchuć	Episode no. 9
2019	Our Century	Irena Krzywicka	Episode no. 10
2021	Barwy szczęścia	Milena Kwietniewska	3 episodes

=== Polish-language dubbing ===
Year	Title	Role	Notes
2022	She-Hulk: Attorney at Law	Nikki Ramos	Main role; 9 episode

=== Audio plays ===
Year	Title	Role
2011	Ciała obce	Woman in a lab coat
2013	Spalenie matki	Nurse
