= BringBackAlice =

2023 Polish crime drama television miniseries

- Polish HBO Max poster
- Genre: Crime drama; Mystery; Thriller; Teen drama
- Created by: Marcin Kubawski; Miłosz Sakowski; Caleb Ranson
- Written by: Marcin Kubawski; Miłosz Sakowski; Caleb Ranson; Danuta Krasnohorska
- Directed by: Dawid Nickel
- Starring: Helena Englert; Sebastian Dela; Bartłomiej Deklewa; Katarzyna Gałązka; Vitalik Havryla; Marcel Opaliński; Mila Jankowska
- Composer: Ádám Balázs
- Country of origin: Poland
- Original language: Polish
- No. of episodes: 6

Production
- Cinematography: Mikołaj Syguda
- Editors: Agata Cierniak; Kamil Grzybowski; Jakub Tomaszewicz; Mateusz Wojtyński
- Running time: 49–55 minutes
- Production companies: Telemark; HBO Max

Original release
- Network: HBO Max
- Release: 14 April – 12 May 2023

BringBackAlice (also known as #BringBackAlice and Bring Back Alice) is a 2023 Polish crime drama television miniseries. It was released on Max on 14 April 2023.

== Premise ==
Alicja Stec, a popular social media influencer in Tri-City, goes missing. A year later, she reappears, but with no recollection of the previous year. Tomek Bielecki, a local drug dealer, suspects that Alicja's disappearance may be connected to the disappearance of his sister, Weronika.

== Cast ==
- Helena Englert as Alicja Stec
- Sebastian Dela as Tomek Bielecki
- Bartłomiej Deklewa as Patryk Kubicki
- Katarzyna Gałązka as Monika Lenart
- Vitalik Havryla as Janek Wojda
- Marcel Opaliński as Michał Czapski
- Mila Jankowska as Paula Czapska
- Marieta Żukowska as Sabina Stec, Alicja's mother
- Jowita Budnik as Inspector Marta Werner
- Stanisław Linowski as Luka Czapski
- Natalia Iwańska as Weronika Bielecka, Tomek's sister
- Marcin Stec as Alicja's father
- Adam Cywka as Oskar Czapski
- Małgorzata Biela as Sergeant Laura Bartos
- Wojciech Ziętek as Łukasz
- Sandra Drzymalska as Oliwia Górska
- Anita Szepelska as Sonia Smolikowska
- Małgorzata Szczerbowska as Tomek and Weronika's mother
- Sandra Korzeniak as Milena, Janek's mother and a psychotherapist
- Rafał Kowalski as Kamil
- Feliks Szajnert as Flis

== Episodes ==
No.	Title	Duration	Original release date
1	"Episode 1"	55 min	14 April 2023
2	"Episode 2"	49 min	14 April 2023
3	"Episode 3"	52 min	21 April 2023
4	"Episode 4"	49 min	28 April 2023
5	"Episode 5"	52 min	5 May 2023
6	"Episode 6"	50 min	12 May 2023

== Production ==
The series was filmed in Gdańsk, Gdynia, and Sopot—also known as Tri-City (Polish: Trójmiasto) in Poland.

== Reception ==
Natalia Nowecka, writing for Radio Eska, considered the series overly derivative of American teen dramas and called it "masochistic entertainment" made by "creators [that] are almost ashamed of their Polishness and try to hide it at all costs". Małgorzata Major of Wirtualnemedia.pl praised the show's casting, but found the show formulaic.

Zuzanna Macieszko of Ciąg Dalszy Nastąpi, a student publication of the University of Gdańsk, concluded that the show was "a Polish version of Euphoria mixed with Elite". She praised the actors' performances, especially Sebastian Dela, who played Tomek Bielecki, and the show's setting in Gdańsk, but found the language used "formulaic" and the imagery unrealistic. Tomasz Zacharczuk, of trojmiasto.pl, criticised the show's dialogue, calling it "pure torture", and said that the series takes a "TikTok-esque approach" which would appeal to teenage audiences. Maja Mikołajczyk of NaTemat.pl said that the show is enjoyable due to its "visual appeal", but compared the acting to "androids pretending to be humans".
