= Andrzej Konopka (actor) =

Polish actor (born 1969)

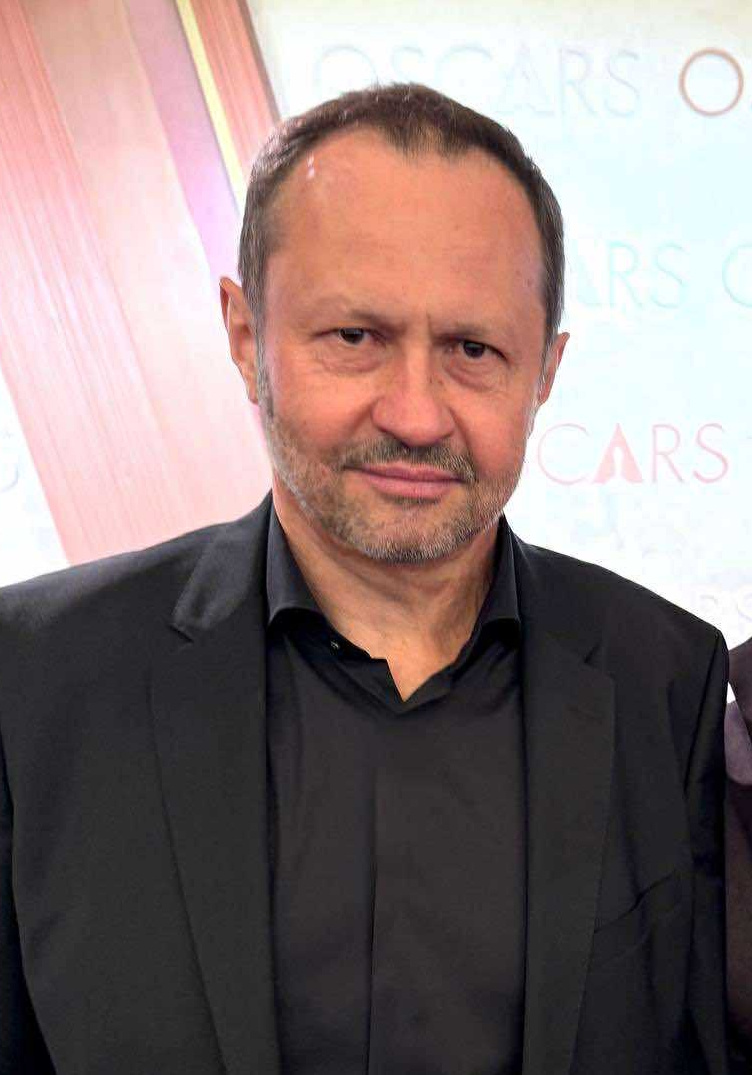
- Konopka in 2025
- Born: 1969 (age 56–57); Wyśmierzyce, Poland
- Education: AST National Academy of Theatre Arts
- Occupation: Actor
- Spouse: Agnieszka Smoczyńska
- Children: 2

Andrzej Konopka (Polish pronunciation: [ˈan.dʐɛj kɔˈnɔp.ka]; born 1969) is a Polish actor.

== Biography ==
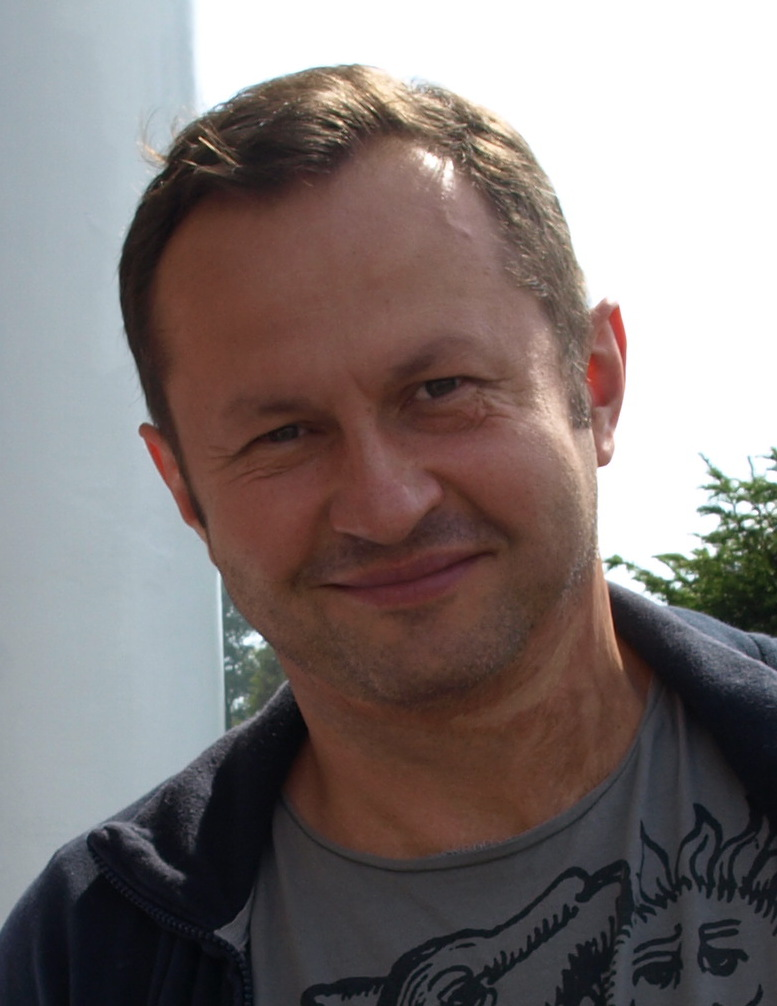
Konopka in 2012

Konopka was born in Wyśmierzyce. He attended high school in Radom and worked as a physical education teacher for a year after graduating. He later attended the AST National Academy of Theatre Arts. He worked at the Juliusz Słowacki Theatre in Kraków and the New Theatre in Łódź.

He is married to filmmaker Agnieszka Smoczyńska.

== Filmography ==
=== Film ===
| Year | Title | Role | Ref. |
|---|---|---|---|
| 2005 | Teraz ja | Husband | |
| 2010 | Joanna | Lucjan | |
| 2011 | Lęk wysokości | Andrzej | |
| 2011 | Rose | Doctor Leliwa | |
| 2014 | Arbiter uwagi | Sułtan | |
| 2014 | Obietnica | Popijający kawę | |
| 2015 | A Grain of Truth | Marszałek | |
| 2015 | Ojciec | Neighbor | |
| 2015 | The Red Spider | Investigative technician | |
| 2015 | Żyć nie umierać | Doctor Waldek | |
| 2015 | These Daughters of Mine | Director | |
| 2015 | Anatomia zła | Colonel | |
| 2015 | The Lure | Drummer | |
| 2016 | Afterimage | Personalny | |
| 2016 | Sługi boże | Tadeusz Kalita | |
| 2016 | Szczęście świata | Konrad | |
| 2016 | Prosta historia o morderstwie | Czerski | |
| 2017 | Spoor | Commander | |
| 2017 | Panic Attack | Jacek | |
| 2018 | Nina | Wojtek | |
| 2018 | The Field Guide to Evil | Kindler | |
| 2018 | Clergy | Construction manager | |
| 2019 | The Iron Bridge | Mikołaj | |
| 2019 | Solid Gold | Nogaj | |
| 2020 | Polot | Stanisław Pacak | |
| 2020 | 25 Years of Innocence | Tołopka | |
| 2020 | Hura, wciąż żyjemy! | Bartender | |
| 2020 | Erotica 2022 | Borys | |
| 2021 | Jakoś to będzie | Teacher | |
| 2022 | Chrzciny | Father Wiesław | |
| 2022 | We Haven't Lost Our Way | Eryk | |
| 2023 | Imago | Stach's father | |
| 2023 | The Peasants | Mayor Piotr | |
| 2023 | Unmoored | Soblewski | |
| 2024 | White Courage | Skorus Wetula | |
| 2024 | Colors of Evil: Red | Tadeusz Dubiela | |
| 2024 | Travel Essentials | Adam | |
| 2025 | Winter of the Crow | Henryk | |
| 2025 | Dom dobry | Zibi | |
| 2025 | Wielka Warszawska | Kaparski | |
| 2025 | LARP: Love, Trolls and Other Quests | Hubert Raban, father of Sergiusz | |
| 2026 | Hot Spot | | |
| 2026 | Powiedz mi, co czujesz | Maria's father | |

=== Television ===
| Year | Title | Role | Notes | Ref. |
|---|---|---|---|---|
| 2004 | Crime Detectives | Worker | 1 episode | |
| 2007 | Prime Minister | Jan Bednarek | 2 episodes | |
| 2008 | L for Love | Doctor | 1 episode | |
| 2008 | Na Wspólnej | Doctor Jarosław | 1 episode | |
| 2008 | Glina | Waldek | 4 episodes | |
| 2009 | Naznaczony | Lekarz | 1 episode | |
| 2009 | Przystań | Irek | 1 episode | |
| 2010 | Sprawiedliwi | German man | 1 episode | |
| 2010 | Hotel 52 | Brzezinski | 1 episode | |
| 2010 | Apetyt na życie | Developer | 1 episode | |
| 2010–2014 | Father Matthew | Zbigniew Kubisz; Marian Bruzda; Doctor | 3 episodes | |
| 2011 | 1920. Wojna i miłość | Widmański | 4 episodes | |
| 2011 | Chichot losu | Albert Wilga | 3 episodes | |
| 2011 | Barwy szczęścia | Ryszard Mikiciuk | 10 episodes | |
| 2011 | Days of Honor | Jürgen Kugel | 5 episodes | |
| 2011 | Warsaw Pact | Siny | 1 episode | |
| 2011 | Szpilki na Giewoncie | Manager | 1 episode | |
| 2012 | Paradoks | Captain Roman Nowaczyk | 1 episode | |
| 2012–2015 | True Law | Sadowski | 10 episodes | |
| 2013 | Głęboka woda | Roman Rowiński | 1 episode | |
| 2013 | Recipe For Life | Przemysław Kłak | 2 episodes | |
| 2013 | Na krawędzi | Commissioner | 2 episodes | |
| 2013 | Medics | Kostrzewa | 1 episode | |
| 2013 | To nie koniec świata | Jarek | 2 episodes | |
| 2013–2014 | Komisarz Alex | Wilczyk | 5 episodes | |
| 2014 | Struggle for Life | Marek | 1 episode | |
| 2015 | Nie rób scen | Krzysztof Jurecki | 9 episodes | |
| 2015 | Prokurator | Tadeusz Dregan | 1 episode | |
| 2015–2016 | Pakt | Wojciech Kowalik | 7 episodes | |
| 2016 | Powiedz tak | Major | 1 episode | |
| 2016 | The Teacher | Przybylski | 5 episodes | |
| 2017 | W rytmie serca | Tomasz Skrzynecki | 1 episode | |
| 2017 | Na dobre i na złe | Darek | 1 episode | |
| 2017–2020 | The Border | Krzysztof Starowicz | 12 episodes | |
| 2018 | Nielegalni | Czerstwy | 4 episodes | |
| 2018 | 1983 | Dominik "Sami" Samolczyk | 1 episode | |
| 2018–2020 | Signs | Commissioner Michał Trela | 16 episodes | |
| 2019 | Pisarze. Serial na krótko | Friend | 1 episode | |
| 2019–2020 | Motyw | Maksymilian Porębski | 8 episodes | |
| 2020 | Bez skrupulów | Paweł Nogaj | 2 episodes | |
| 2020 | The Elements of Sasza – Fire | Inspector Wojciech "Drugi" Szkudłapski | 7 episodes | |
| 2021 | Planeta singli. Osiem historii | Jerzy Stobnicki | 1 episode | |
| 2022 | Wotum nieufności | Krystian Hajkowski | 6 episodes | |
| 2023 | Dom pod Dwoma Orłami | Jan Liski | 3 episodes | |
| 2023 | Absolute Beginners | Paweł | 6 episodes | |
| 2023 | Feedback | Zbyszek | 4 episodes | |
| 2023 | The Nordic Murders | Grzegorz Kuchar | 2 episodes | |
| 2024 | Klara | Sławek | 1 episode | |
| 2024 | The Thaw | Staszek Galewski | 5 episodes | |
| 2025 | Hound's Hill | Dobociński | 5 episodes | |
| 2025 | The Eastern Gate | Zbigniew Lange | 4 episodes | |
| 2025 | Heweliusz | Kubara | | |

== Accolades ==
In 2025, at the Polish Film Festival he received award for best supporting actor for his role in LARP: Love, Trolls and Other Quests.
