= Árni Ólafur Ásgeirsson =

Icelandic film director

- Born: 16 April 1972; Reykjavík, Iceland
- Died: 26 April 2021 (aged 49)
- Education: Łódź Film School
- Occupations: film director; screenwriter
- Spouse: Marta Luiza Macuga
- Children: 1

Árni Ólafur Ásgeirsson (16 April 1972 – 26 April 2021), also known as Árni Óli, was an Icelandic film director and screenwriter.

== Career ==
Árni Óli was born in Reykjavík, Iceland, in 1972. He graduated from the Łódź Film School in Poland in 2001.

Árni Óli's career began with the celebrated short film Anna's Day (Annas dag), which won the International Award at the Clermont-Ferrand International Short Film Festival in 2003. His first feature film was Thicker Than Water (Blóðbönd), which won the Special Prize of the Jury at International Filmfestival Mannheim-Heidelberg. Árni Óli won the Edda Award for Best Film (Kvikmynd ársins) in 2011 for his work Undercurrent (Brim), and also won the Russian Film Clubs Federation Award at the Moscow International Film Festival. Árni Óli's third feature as director was the animated film Ploey: You Never Fly Alone (Lói: Þú flýgur aldrei einn) in 2018, the most expensive Icelandic film ever made. His final feature film was the Polish-Icelandic production Wolka, released after his death in 2021.

== Personal life ==
Árni Óli was married to Marta Luiza Macuga with whom he had one son.

== Illness and death ==
In February 2021, Árni Óli was diagnosed with a rare form of bone cancer. He died from the illness on 26 April the same year.

== Filmography ==
- Gaddavír í gelgjunni (1993, Short)
- P.S. (2001, Short)
- Anna's Day (Annas dag) (2003, Short)
- Thicker Than Water (Blóðbönd) (2006)
- Scratches: Part 1 (2006, Short)
- Undercurrent (Brim) (2010)
- Ploey: You Never Fly Alone (Lói: Þú flýgur aldrei einn) (2018)
- Wolka (2021)
- Queen (2022)
