= Konrad Eleryk =

Polish actor (born 1989)

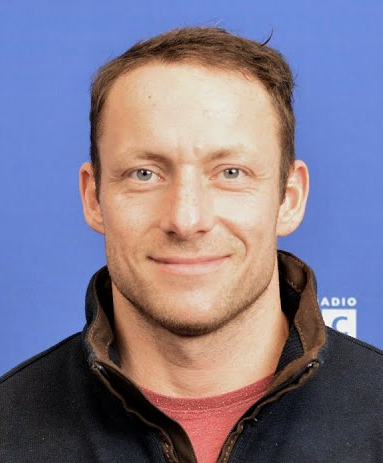
- Eleryk in 2025
- Born: 1989 (age 36–37); Warsaw, Poland
- Education: Łódź Film School
- Occupation: Actor
- Years active: 2013–present

Konrad Eleryk (born 1989) is a Polish actor.

== Biography ==
Eleryk was born in Warsaw and grew up in Grochów. In his youth, he played football for Agrykola Warszawa and Gwardia Warsaw. He also trained in Muay Thai.

He was expelled from school in his final year of gymnasium for behavioral issues. After failing out of technikum and being kicked out of general liceum, he graduated from an adult liceum and passed his matura. He originally planned to be a professional footballer, but a knee injury ended his plans. He later decided to pursue acting and graduated from the Łódź Film School in 2017.

== Filmography ==
=== Film ===
Year	Title	Role	Ref.
2015	The New World	Omonowiec	
2015	These Daughters of Mine	Paramedic	
2015	Król życia	Soldier	
2016	Gejsza	Jakub Garda	
2017	Cicha noc	Man on the bus	
2019	Solid Gold	Jedynak's gorilla	
2021	All Our Fears	Sławek	
2021	Furioza	Olo	
2022	Alpha Male	Andrzej	
2022	Apokawixa	Tołdi	
2022	Liczba doskonała	ZOMO officer	
2023	Wyrwa	Ułan	
2023	Mother's Day	Tytus	
2023	Horror Story	Jarek	
2024	Wrooklyn Zoo	Hades	
2024	Kulej. Dwie strony medalu	Aluś Koncewicz	
2024	Letters to Santa 6	Paweł	
2025	Przepiękne!	Kuba	

=== Television ===
Year	Title	Role	Notes	Ref.
2013	Komisarz Alex	Elegant	1 episode	
2013	Days of Honor		1 episode	
2013	True Law	Soldier	1 episode	
2015	Strażacy	PSP firefighter	1 episode	
2017	O mnie się nie martw	David	1 episode	
2017	Na Wspólnej	Stanisław Barczyk	6 episodes	
2017	Ultraviolet	Hooligan	1 episode	
2017–2018	Friends	Jacek	13 episodes	
2017–2018	Na dobre i na złe	Maciej	1 episode	
2018	The Defence	Wit	1 episode	
2019	The Trap	Security guard	2 episodes	
2019	Echo serca	Piotr Makowski	1 episode	
2019–2020	Zawsze warto	Aspirant	4 episodes	
2020	Father Matthew	Robert Kocur	1 episode	
2020	Bez skrupułów	Jedynak's gorilla	1 episode	
2021	Klangor	Emil Knapik	6 episodes	
2021	Planeta singli. Osiem historii	Maciej Złotowski	1 episode	
2022	Furioza	Olo	4 episodes	
2022	Nieobecni	Policeman	2 episodes	
2022	The Green Glove Gang	Brykalski's bodyguard	3 episodes	
2022	Raven	Bogdan Tereszczenko	1 episode	
2022	Glitter	Wojtek	2 episodes	
2022–2023	The Convict	Krystian Malek	5 episodes	
2023	Sexify	Commander	1 episode	
2023	Mój agent	Lis	1 episode	
2023	Emigracja XD	Bolo Tokar	2 episodes	
2023	Pati	Krystian Malek	6 episodes	
2023	Infamy	Orlando	4 episodes	
2023	The Stroke	Benek	8 episodes	
2024	The Mire	Groszek	6 episodes	
2024	Klara	Janicki	1 episode	
2024	Prosta sprawa	Czarny	1 episode	
2024	Go Ahead, Brother	Sylwester Zajfert	6 episodes	
2025	Heweliusz	Skirmuntt	5 episodes	

=== Video games ===
Year	Title	Role	Ref.
2025	Kingdom Come: Deliverance II	Adder	
