= Sebastian Dela =

Polish actor (born 1996)

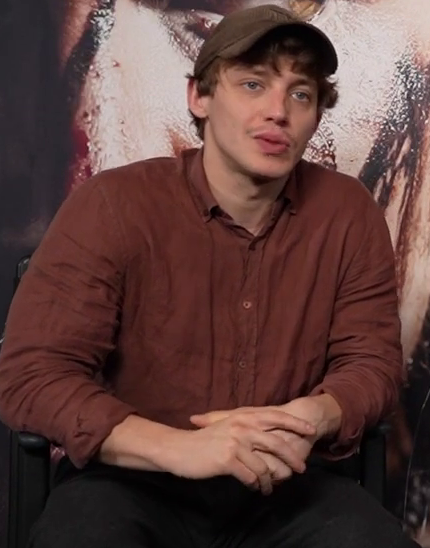
- Sebastian Dela, 2025
- Born: 19 December 1996 (age 29)
- Citizenship: Polish
- Occupation: Actor

Sebastian Dela (born 19 December 1996) is an actor.

== Biography ==
In 2023 he graduated in acting from Łódź Film School. Since 2024, he has been performing at the National Theatre in Warsaw. In 2026, he received nomination to the Zbigniew Cybulski Award for his role in Błazny.

== Filmography ==
- Nobody Sleeps in the Woods Tonight (2020) as Daniel Czajka
- Wilk (2021), TV series, as Tymon
- Pitbull (2021) as Jarek Goc, son of "Gebels"
- Miłość, seks & pandemia (2021) as Bartek
- Braty (2022) as Bartek
- Zadra (2022) as "DJ Griper"
- Gorzko gorzko (2022) as Adrian
- Król Edyp (2022), TV Theatre
- Below The Surface. ORP Orzeł (2022) as sailor
- Into the Wind (2022) as Kuba
- BringBackAlice (2023) as Tomek Bielecki
- Błazny (2023) as Olo Kosak
- Dzień matki (2023) as "Teleskop"
- Krucjata II (2024), TV series, as Bronek Jamroży
- Innego końca nie będzie (2024) as "Pipek", brother of Ola and Ajka
- Go Ahead, Brother (2024) as Sebastian "Gemboj"
- Dziki (2025) as Stasek
- Czarna śmierć (2025), TV series, as Janek
- Chcę więcej (2025) as Tomek Słomka
- Tell Me What You Feel (2026)
- SOR (2026)
