= Piotr Polak =

Polish actor (born 1980)

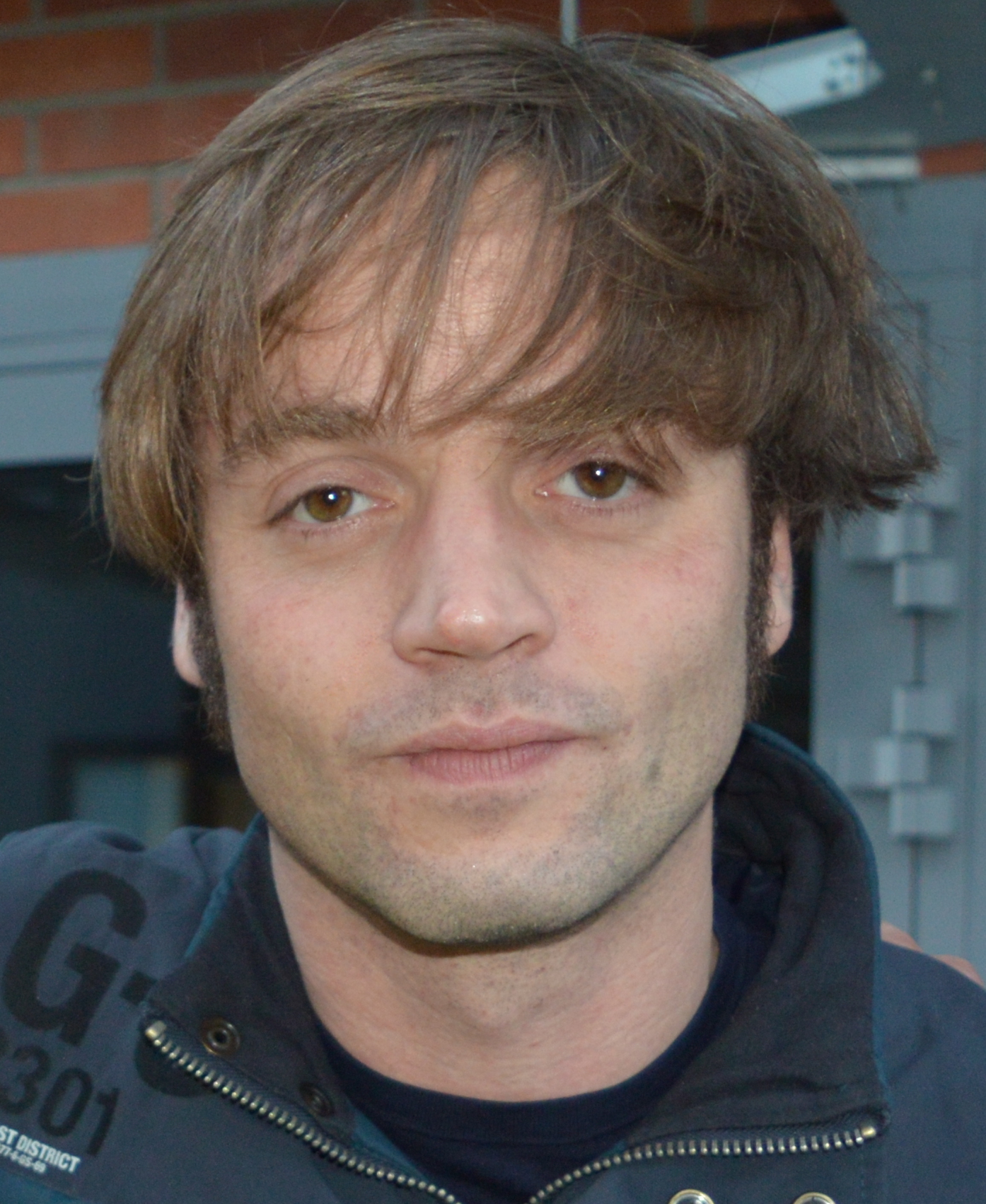
- Polak in 2015
- Born: 24 December 1980 (age 45); Kraków, Poland
- Education: National Academy of Theatre Arts
- Occupation: Actor
- Years active: 2005–present
- Spouse: Joanna Drozda (m. 2008, sep.)
- Children: 1

Piotr Polak (Polish: [ˈpjɔtr ˈpɔ.lak]; born 24 December 1980) is a Polish film, television, stage, and voice actor. He is best known for portraying Michał Holc in the mockumentary sitcom series The Office PL (2021–2025), and Piotr "Sanczo" in the comedy drama series Still Here (2022). Polak starred as Adam Nowak, the main character in the 2017 science fiction romance film The Man with the Magic Box, as Dirk in the 2020 drama film Hurrah, We Are Still Alive!, as Tadeusz in the 2024 fantasy film Diplodocus The Green Dinosaur, and as Karol, husband of Karol, in the 2024 black comedy film Inheritance. He also portrayed Orest Jakimow, a recurring character in the drama series Miłość nad rozlewiskiem (2010), and its continuations, Życie nad rozlewiskiem (2011), Nad rozlewiskiem (2012), and Cisza nad rozlewiskiem (2013–2014).

== Biography ==
Piotr Polak was born on 24 December 1980 in Kraków, Poland, and grew up in Nowy Targ. He is a son of rally driver Wiktor Polak, and a brother of actress Jaśmina Polak. In 1986, his family moved to Chicago, Illinois, United States, where he attended kindergarten, due to fears of radiation from the Chernobyl disaster, later moving back to Poland. He graduated in 2004 from the Faculty of Acting of the National Academy of Theatre Arts in Kraków. He performed in theaters such as the Wojciech Bogusławski Theatre in Kalisz (2004–2005), the Helena Modrzejewska National Old Theatre in Kraków (2005–2008), the Dramatic Theatre in Warsaw (2008–2011), and the New Theatre in Warsaw (2011–present).

Polak had a minor role as a drug addict in the 2006 drama feature film Who Never Lived. He also had several secondary roles in television series in such as Pensjonat pod Różą (2005), Wiedźmy (2005), Wielkie ucieczki (2006), Twarzą w twarz (2007), and Wydział zabójstw (2008). Later, he portrayed Orest Jakimow, a recurring character in the drama series Miłość nad rozlewiskiem (2010), and its continuations, Życie nad rozlewiskiem (2011), Nad rozlewiskiem (2012), and Cisza nad rozlewiskiem (2013–2014). Polak had several secondary roles in the television series, such as Bernaś in True Law (2013), Aleksander "Penguin" in Deep Water (2013), Józef Kurowski in L for Love (2014–2015), Joshua in 1983 (2018), Kamil Ostasz in Drogi wolności (2018), and Henryk Murawski in Erinyes (2022). He portrayed Michał Holc, one of the main characters in the mockumentary sitcom series The Office PL (2021–2025), and Piotr "Sanczo", one of the main characters in the comedy drama series Still Here (2022). He starred as Adam Nowak, the main character in the 2017 science fiction romance film The Man with the Magic Box, as Dirk in the 2020 drama film Hurrah, We Are Still Alive!, as Tadeusz in the 2024 fantasy film Diplodocus The Green Dinosaur, and as Karol, husband of Karol, in the 2024 black comedy film Inheritance. He also had secondary roles such as Piotr in Plan B (2018), Ciemno, prawie noc (2019), Erotica 2022 (2021), Other People (2021), Anxiety (2023), and Woman Of... (2023). He is also voice actor, having participated in numerous Polish-language dubbing productions, including portraying Han Solo in the 2011 renditions of the Star Wars original trilogy films A New Hope, The Empire Strikes Back, and Return of the Jedi.

In 2021, Polak received an award for the best short film actor at the Horrible Imaginings Film Festival in San Diego, United States, for his role in the 2019 drama film The Tumble. In 2021, he was nominated to the Telecamera award in the best male actor category, for his role in the series The Office PL.

== Personal life ==
In 2008, Piotr Polak married actress Joanna Drozda, with whom he has a son, born in 2012. The couple has since separated.

== Filmography ==
=== Films ===
Year	Title	Role	Notes
2005	Nie śpij		Short film
2006	Who Never Lived	Drug addict	Feature film
2011	Księstwo		Feature film
2013	10 apgar	Husband	Short film
2014	Bittersweet!	Groom	Short film
2014	Summer of Love		Short film; voice
2015	60	Fashion designer	Short film
2016	Apocalypse	Maurycy	Short film
2016	Słońce, to słońce mnie oślepiło	Lawyer	Feature film
2016	Perseids	Bartek	Short film
2017	The Man with the Magic Box	Adam Nowak	Feature film
2017	The Best Fireworks Ever	Jan Długosz	Short film
2018	Boys With Butterflies	PE teacher	Short film
2018	Plan B	Piotr	Feature film
2019	Dark, Almost Night	Motionless Angler	Feature film
2019	The Tumble	Adam	Short film
2019	Królewna Logorea i niedźwiedź	Bear cup	Television play
2019	Kurort		Short film
2020	Four Cups of Coffee or Three		Short film
2020	Hurrah, We Are Still Alive!	Dirk	Feature film
2020	Wyjeżdżamy		Television play
2021	Erotica 2022	Boss	Feature film
2021	Other People	Chateau Rosso	Feature film
2021	Other People	Additional voices	Voice; feature film
2021	Warning	Frank	Feature film
2023	Anxiety	Patryk	Feature film
2023	Mandela	Bartek	Short film
2023	Woman Of...	Lawyer	Feature film
2024	Diplodocus The Green Dinosaur	Tadeusz	Feature film
2024	Diplodocus The Green Dinosaur	Choir of Onions	Voice; feature film
2024	Inheritance	Karol, fiancé of Karol	Feature film
2024	Such a Perfect Day	Tomasz	Short film

=== Television series ===
Year	Title	Role	Notes
2005	Pensjonat pod Różą	Hubert	2 episodes
2005	Wiedźmy	Wojtek	2 episodes
2006	Crime Detectives	Man	Episode: "Pokonać strach"
2006	Wielkie ucieczki	Mechanic	Episode: "Przerwany lot"
2007	Twarzą w twarz	Blackmailer	2 episodes
2008	Days of Honor		Episode: "Skok"
2008	Wydział zabójstw	Marta's boyfriend	Episode: "Krew"
2010	Miłość nad rozlewiskiem	Orest Jakimow	Recurring role; 9 episodes
2011	Życie nad rozlewiskiem	Orest Jakimow	Recurring role; 11 episodes
2012	Nad rozlewiskiem	Orest Jakimow	Recurring role; 9 episodes
2013	True Law	Bernaś	Episode no. 43
2013	Deep Water	Aleksander "Penguin"	3 episodes
2013–2014	Cisza nad rozlewiskiem	Orest Jakimow	Recurring role; 6 episodes
2014–2015	L for Love	Józef Kurowski	4 episodes
2015	Aż po sufit!	Dawid	Episode: "Podróż sentymentalna"
2018	1983	Joshua	2 episodes
2018	Drogi wolności	Kamil Ostasz	5 episodes
2021–2025	The Office PL	Michał Holc	Main role; 48 episodes
2022	Erinyes	Henryk Murawski	3 episodes
2022	Still Here	Piotr "Sanczo"	Recurring role; 7 episodes

=== Polish-language dubbing ===
Year	Title	Role	Notes
2006	Au Pair II	Michael Hausen	Feature film; originally released in 2001
2006	MegaMan NT Warrior	Gorou Misaki	Television series; episode: "Threat of the Asteroid"; originally released in 2004
2006	MegaMan NT Warrior	BubbleMan	Television series; originally released between 2002 and 2004
2006	MegaMan NT Warrior	Malenkov	Television series; episode: "Underground Hero"; originally released in 2004
2006	MegaMan NT Warrior	Roll's rival	Television series
2006	Totally Spies!	Thomas Hanson	Television series; episode: "Evil Heiress Much?""
2006	Totally Spies!	Ice-cream vendor	Episode: "Sis-KaBOOM-Bah!"
2006	Totally Spies!	Rodney	Television series; episode: "Beauty Is Skin Deep"
2006	Totally Spies!	Kyle Katz	Television series; episode: "The Suavest Spy"
2006	Totally Spies!	Library security guard	Television series; episode: "Spy Soccer"
2006	Totally Spies!	Barbecue restaurant owner	Television series; episode: "Spies on the Farm"
2006	Totally Spies!	John's son as a broccoli and carrot	Television series; episode: "Spies on the Farm"
2006	Totally Spies!	Chet	Television series; episode: "Spies in Space"
2006	Totally Spies!	Supernova	Television series; episode: "Spies in Space"
2007	Dark Oracle	Lance Stone	Television series; main role; 26 episodes; originally released between 2004 and 2006
2007	Totally Spies!	Ginger child	Television series; episode: "Totally Busted! Part II"
2007	Totally Spies!	Black-haired child	Television series; episode: "Totally Busted! Part II"
2007	Totally Spies!	Chet	Television series; episode: "Evil Graduation"
2007	Totally Spies!	School student	Television series; episode: "Evil Graduation"
2007	Totally Spies!	Physics teacher	Television series; episode: "Evil Roommate"
2007	Totally Spies!	Franklin	Television series; episode: "Evil Professor"
2007	Totally Spies!	Government agent	Television series; episode: "Evil Professor"
2007	Totally Spies!	Security guard guarding the Resizing Ray	Television series; episode: "Evil Professor"
2007	Totally Spies!	Secret laboratory security guard	Television series; episode: "Evil Professor"
2007	Totally Spies!	Bank director	Television series; episode: "The Granny"
2007	Totally Spies!	Blaine	3 episodes
2007	Totally Spies!	Mall Rat	Television series; episode: "Another Evil Boyfriend"
2007	Totally Spies!	Juliano	Television series; episode: "Evil Pizza Guys"
2007	Totally Spies!	Cook	Television series; episode: "Evil Pizza Guys"
2008–2009	Monster Buster Club	Charlie	Television series; originally released between 2007 and 2009
2008–2009	Monster Buster Club	Gilbert	Television series; originally released between 2007 and 2009
2009–2010	Zeke and Luther	Zeke Falcone	Television series; main role; 21 episodes
2010	Legend of the Guardians: The Owls of Ga'Hoole	Kludd	Feature film
2011	Star Wars: Episode IV – A New Hope	Han Solo	Feature film; originally released in 1977
2011	Star Wars: Episode V – The Empire Strikes Back	Han Solo	Feature film; originally released in 1980
2011	Star Wars: Episode VI – Return of the Jedi	Han Solo	Feature film; originally released in 1983
2014	The Lego Movie	Han Solo	Feature film
2014	Phineas and Ferb	Han Solo	Television series; episode: "Phineas and Ferb: Star Wars"
2015	Disney Infinity 3.0	Han Solo	Video game
2016	Lego Star Wars: Droid Tales	Han Solo	Television series; 4 episodes
2018	The Quake	Kristian Eikjord	Feature film
2018	Ready Player One	i-R0k	Feature film
2020	Cats & Dogs 3: Paws Unite!	Roger	Feature film
2020	Valorant	Phoenix	Video game
2021	Lego Star Wars: Terrifying Tales	Han Solo	Television film
2021	Pil's Adventures		Feature film
2022	Just Like Me!	George	Television series; main role; originally released between 2016 and 2017
2022	Lego Star Wars: Summer Vacation	Han Solo	Television film
2022	Lego Star Wars: The Skywalker Saga	Han Solo	Video game
2023	Convergence: A League of Legends Story		Video game
2023	Doctor Who	Fourteenth Doctor	Television series; main role; 3 episodes
2023	What If...?	Ant-Man (Scott Lang)	Episode: "What If... the Avengers Assembled in 1602?"
2024	Dr Panda	Richy	Television series; recurring role; 22 episodes; originally released in 2019
2024	Echo	Henry "Black Crow" Lopez	Television series; main role; 5 episodes
2024	IF	Cal	Feature film
2024	Kite Man: Hell Yeah!	Security guard with a scar	Television series; episode: "Pilot, Hell Yeah!"
2024	Kite Man: Hell Yeah!	Security guard #15	Television series; 2 episodes
2024	Moon Girl and Devil Dinosaur	Franklin	Television series; episode: "In the Heist"
2025	Marvel Zombies	Ant-Man (Scott Lang)	Television series; 2 episodes
2025	Mickey 17	Mickey Barnes	Feature film
2025	Mickey 17	Mickey 17	Feature film
2025	Mickey 17	Mickey 18	Feature film
2025	Freakier Friday	Jake	Feature film
2025	Lego Star Wars: Rebuild the Galaxy	Han Solo	Television series; 2 episodes

=== Audio plays ===
Year	Title	Role
2015	Stasinada (według Komedii rodzinnych)	
2020	Biały ląd	
2020	Karol	
2022	Kieszonkowy pancernik	
2022	Mindowe	Trojnat
2022	Sen o wolnym świecie	
2022	Usterka na skraju galaktyki	
2022	Wichrowe Wzgórza	Edgar Linton
2023	Upadek narodu	Camara
2025	Last night	Alek

== Accolades ==
Accolades received by Ghosts
Year	Award	Category	Nominated work	Result	Ref.
2021	Horrible Imaginings Film Festival Awards	Best short film actor	The Tumble	Won	
2024	Telecameras	Best male actor	The Office PL	Nominated	
