= List of Przepis na życie episodes =

Przepis na życie (English: Recipe For Life) is a Polish Comedy drama television series produced by Akson Studio for the TVN network. The series was created and written by Polish actress Agnieszka Pilaszewska. It premiered on 6 March 2011 at 21:25 after X Factor. For the 2011 to 2013 episodes, actress Maja Ostaszewska appeared together with leading actor Piotr Adamczyk.

== Series overview ==
Series	Episodes	Timeslot	Originally released		TV season	Viewers (in millions)	Average share (16–49)
Series	Episodes	Timeslot	First released	Last released	TV season	Viewers (in millions)	Average share (16–49)
1	13	Sunday 9:25 p.m.	6 March 2011	29 May 2011	Spring 2011	3.17	25.8%
2	13	Tuesday 9:30 p.m.	6 September 2011	29 November 2011	Autumn 2011	2.84	25.6%
3	13	Tuesday 9:30 p.m.	6 March 2012	29 May 2012	Spring 2012	2.70	24.4%
4	13	Sunday 9:00 p.m.	24 February 2013	19 May 2013	Spring 2013	2.40	19.4%
5	13	Sunday 9:00 p.m.	1 September 2013	24 November 2013	Autumn 2013	2.27	19.3%

== Episodes ==
=== Series 1 (2011) ===
No. overall	No. in season	Title	Directed by	Written by	Original release date	Viewers (millions)
1	1	"Episode 1"	Agnieszka Pilaszewska	Michał Rogalski	6 March 2011	2.93
2	2	"Episode 2"	Agnieszka Pilaszewska	Michał Rogalski	13 March 2011	N/A
3	3	"Episode 3"	Agnieszka Pilaszewska	Michał Rogalski	20 March 2011	3.41
4	4	"Episode 4"	Agnieszka Pilaszewska	Michał Rogalski	27 March 2011	3.04
5	5	"Episode 5"	Agnieszka Pilaszewska	Michał Rogalski	3 April 2011	3.41
6	6	"Episode 6"	Agnieszka Pilaszewska	Michał Rogalski	10 April 2011	3.35
7	7	"Episode 7"	Agnieszka Pilaszewska	Michał Rogalski	17 April 2011	3.35
8	8	"Episode 8"	Agnieszka Pilaszewska	Michał Rogalski	24 April 2011	2.86
9	9	"Episode 9"	Agnieszka Pilaszewska	Michał Rogalski	1 May 2011	2.69
10	10	"Episode 10"	Agnieszka Pilaszewska	Michał Rogalski	8 May 2011	3.35
11	11	"Episode 11"	Agnieszka Pilaszewska	Łukasz Wiśniewski	15 May 2011	3.24
12	12	"Episode 12"	Agnieszka Pilaszewska	Michał Rogalski	22 May 2011	3.24
13	13	"Episode 13"	Agnieszka Pilaszewska	Michał Rogalski	29 May 2011	3.50

=== Series 2 (2011) ===
No. overall	No. in season	Title	Directed by	Written by	Original release date	Viewers (millions)
14	1	"Episode 14"	Agnieszka Pilaszewska	Michał Rogalski	6 September 2011	2.31
15	2	"Episode 15"	Agnieszka Pilaszewska	Michał Rogalski	13 September 2011	2.59
16	3	"Episode 16"	Agnieszka Pilaszewska	Michał Rogalski	20 September 2011	3.10
17	4	"Episode 17"	Agnieszka Pilaszewska	Michał Rogalski	27 September 2011	3.08
18	5	"Episode 18"	Agnieszka Pilaszewska	Michał Rogalski	4 October 2011	2.93
19	6	"Episode 19"	Agnieszka Pilaszewska	Michał Rogalski	11 October 2011	2.80
20	7	"Episode 20"	Agnieszka Pilaszewska	Łukasz Wiśniewski	18 October 2011	2.90
21	8	"Episode 21"	Agnieszka Pilaszewska	Michał Rogalski	25 October 2011	2.90
22	9	"Episode 22"	Agnieszka Pilaszewska	Łukasz Wiśniewski	1 November 2011	2.94
23	10	"Episode 23"	Agnieszka Pilaszewska	Łukasz Wiśniewski	8 November 2011	2.90
24	11	"Episode 24"	Agnieszka Pilaszewska	Michał Rogalski	15 November 2011	2.79
25	12	"Episode 25"	Agnieszka Pilaszewska	Łukasz Wiśniewski	22 November 2011	2.82
26	13	"Episode 26"	Agnieszka Pilaszewska	Łukasz Wiśniewski	29 November 2011	2.90

=== Series 3 (2012) ===
No. overall	No. in season	Title	Directed by	Written by	Original release date	Viewers (millions)
27	1	"Episode 27"	Agnieszka Pilaszewska	Łukasz Wiśniewski	6 March 2012	N/A
28	2	"Episode 28"	Agnieszka Pilaszewska	Michał Rogalski	13 March 2012	2.84
29	3	"Episode 29"	Agnieszka Pilaszewska	Michał Rogalski	20 March 2012	N/A
30	4	"Episode 30"	Agnieszka Pilaszewska	Łukasz Wiśniewski	27 March 2012	2.85
31	5	"Episode 31"	Agnieszka Pilaszewska	Łukasz Wiśniewski	3 April 2012	2.78
32	6	"Episode 32"	Agnieszka Pilaszewska	Michał Rogalski	10 April 2012	N/A
33	7	"Episode 33"	Agnieszka Pilaszewska	Łukasz Wiśniewski	17 April 2012	2.95
34	8	"Episode 34"	Agnieszka Pilaszewska	Michał Rogalski	24 April 2012	N/A
35	9	"Episode 35"	Agnieszka Pilaszewska	Łukasz Wiśniewski	1 May 2012	N/A
36	10	"Episode 36"	Agnieszka Pilaszewska	Łukasz Wiśniewski	8 May 2012	2.96
37	11	"Episode 37"	Agnieszka Pilaszewska	Michał Rogalski	15 May 2012	2.80
38	12	"Episode 38"	Agnieszka Pilaszewska	Michał Rogalski	22 May 2012	N/A
39	13	"Episode 39"	Agnieszka Pilaszewska	Michał Rogalski	29 May 2012	N/A
