= Klangor =

Polish crime drama television series

- Polish poster
- Genre: Crime drama; Mystery
- Created by: Tomasz Kamiński
- Written by: Kacper Wysocki
- Directed by: Łukasz Kośmicki
- Starring: Arkadiusz Jakubik; Maja Ostaszewska; Katarzyna Gałązka; Piotr Witkowski; Wojciech Mecwaldowski; Aleksandra Popławska; Magdalena Czerwińska; Ludwik Borkowski
- Composer: Mikołaj Trzaska
- Country of origin: Poland
- Original language: Polish
- No. of seasons: 1
- No. of episodes: 8

Production
- Producers: Łukasz Dzięcioł; Piotr Dzięcioł; Agnieszka Nejman; Anna Różalska
- Cinematography: Witold Płóciennik
- Editors: Piotr Kmiecik; Wojciech Mrówczyński
- Running time: 44–57 minutes
- Production company: Opus TV

Original release
- Network: Canal+
- Release: 26 March 2021 – present

Klangor is a Polish crime drama television series created by Tomasz Kamiński. It began airing on Canal+ on 26 March 2021.

== Premise ==
A teenager disappears without a trace in Świnoujście. Her father, a prison psychologist, sets out to find her on his own.

== Cast ==
- Arkadiusz Jakubik as Rafał Wejman
- Maja Ostaszewska as Magda Wejman
- Wojciech Mecwaldowski as Piotr Ryszka
- Piotr Witkowski as Krzysztof Ryszka
- Magdalena Czerwińska as Danka Schulze
- Olga Rayska as Sati Galej
- Aleksandra Popławska as Ewa Ryszka
- Maciej Musiał as Ariel Galej
- Katarzyna Gałązka as Hania Wejman
- Matylda Giegżno as Gabi Wejman
- Konrad Eleryk as Emil Knapik
- Cezary Kosiński as Jerzy Majchrzak
- Filip Urbanke as Maciej Peda
- Magdalena Koleśnik as Paulina
- Paulina Gałązka as Ola Majdzik

== Episodes ==
No.	Title	Duration	Original release date
1	"Episode 1"	57 min	26 March 2021
2	"Episode 2"	45 min	3 April 2021
3	"Episode 3"	46 min	10 April 2021
4	"Episode 4"	45 min	16 April 2021
5	"Episode 5"	44 min	23 April 2021
6	"Episode 6"	54 min	30 April 2021
7	"Episode 7"	44 min	7 May 2021
8	"Episode 8"	51 min	14 May 2021

== Production ==
The series was filmed in Świnoujście and Międzyzdroje in 2020.
