= Tell Me What You Feel =

- Directed by: Łukasz Ronduda
- Written by: Łukasz Ronduda, Agata K. Koschmieder
- Starring: Jan Sałasiński, Izabella Dudziak
- Cinematography: Weronika Bilska
- Release date: 2026
- Country: Poland
- Language: Polish

Tell Me What You Feel (Polish: Powiedz mi, co czujesz) is a 2026 film directed by Łukasz Ronduda, written by Ronduda and Agata K. Koschmieder.

== Production ==
The film was shot in Warsaw; locations included the Museum of Modern Art.

== Cast ==
- Jan Sałasiński as Patryk
- Izabella Dudziak as Maria
- Anita Poddębniak as Patryk's mother
- Adam Szyszkowski as Patryk's father
- Aleksandra Justa as Maria's mother
- Andrzej Konopka as Maria's father
- Sebastian Dela as Tomasz

== Release and reception ==
The film was screened at the Big Screen Competition at the 55th International Film Festival Rotterdam. It received Silver Lions and best acting debut awards at the 2026 Polish Film Festival.
