= Piotr Witkowski =

Polish actor (born 1988)

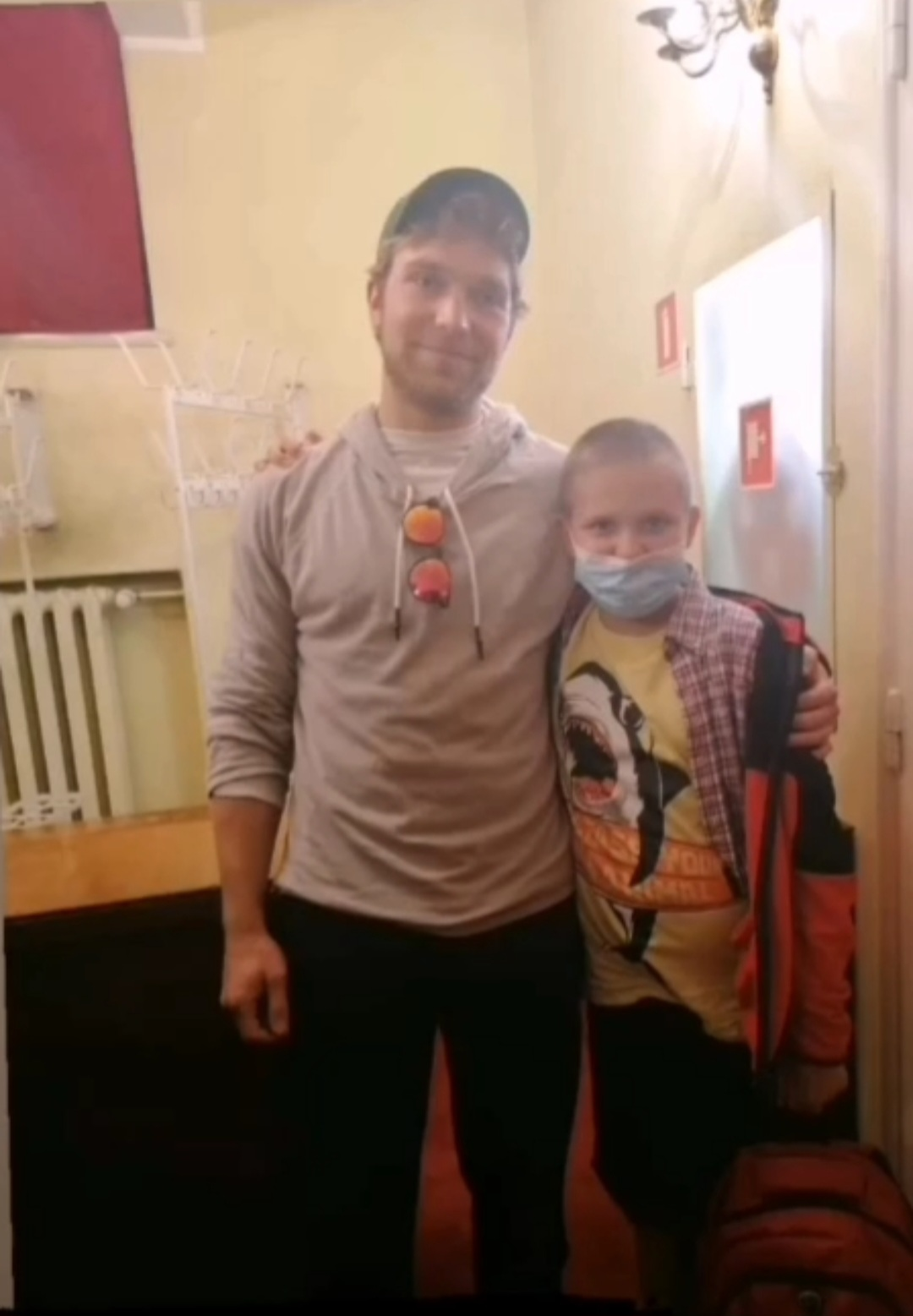
- Born: 12 December 1988 (age 37); Gdańsk, Poland
- Occupation: Actor
- Years active: 2011–present

Piotr Witkowski (born 12 December 1988) is a Polish actor.

== Life and career ==
In 2010, he collaborated with the Chorea theater in Łódź. In 2011, he graduated from the Łódź Film School.

Since 2012, he has been performing at the Wybrzeże Theater in Gdańsk. In 2019, he played the main role in the film by Michał Węgrzyn, Proceder, telling about the life of the tragically deceased rapper Tomasz Chada.

== Filmography ==
=== Film ===
Year	Title	Role	Notes	Ref.
2012	Supermarket	Andrzej		
2013	Walesa: Man of Hope	Shipyard worker		
2013	Noc	Marek		
2014	Warsaw 44	Boy with bucket		
2015	Heimat ist kein ort	Krzszystof	Television film	
2018	Taxing Love	Father of child		
2018	Squadron 303	Johann Behr		
2019	Diablo. The Race for Everything	Pejolt		
2019	Proceder	Tomasz Chada		
2020	Erotica 2022	Dealer	Segment: "Nocna zmiana"	
2020	The Champion	Walter		
2021	Bartkowiak	Szakal		
2021	The End	Sebastian Stec		
2021	Other People	Danny		
2022	Gierek	Oldman		
2022	Krime Story	Szybki		
2022	Lesson Plan	Damian Nowicki		
2022	A Night at the Kindergarten	Eryk		
2023	Blef doskonaly	Virus		
2023	Radiostory	Security guard		
2023	Soulcatcher	Robert Kiel		
2025	A Working Man	Vanko Kharchenko		

=== Television ===
Year	Title	Role	Notes	Ref.
2011	Plebania	Szymon	5 episodes	
2013	Days of Honor		2 episodes	
2014	L for Love	Boy	1 episode	
2015	Zbrodnia	TV reporter	3 episodes	
2016–18	Barwy szczęścia	Michał Grzybowski	12 episodes	
2017	Niania w wielkim mieście	Filip	1 episode	
2018–19	Na Wspólnej	Bartek Drzewiecki	31 episodes	
2018–19	Ślad	Bartosz Majski	39 episodes	
2020	Bez skrupulów	Policeman Adam	1 episode	
2021	Klangor	Krzszystof Ryszka	7 episodes	
2021	Uklad	Marek Araszkiewicz	4 episodes	
2021	Planeta Singli. Osiem historii	Jacek	1 episode	
2022	Queen	Bruno Adamski	4 episodes	
2023	Der Masuren-Krimi	Felix	1 episode	
2023	Absolute Beginners	Dawid	6 episodes	
2023	Go Ahead, Brother	Oskar	6 episodes	
2024	FBI International	Piotrek	1 episode	
2025-	The Black Dagger Brotherhood	Darius	1 episode	
