= Ploey: You Never Fly Alone =

2018 Icelandic animated film

- Poster
- Icelandic: Lói: Þú flýgur aldrei einn
- Directed by: Árni Ólafur Ásgeirsson
- Written by: Friðrik Erlingsson
- Produced by: Hilmar Sigurðsson; Ives Agemans
- Edited by: Jon Stefansson
- Music by: Atli Örvarsson
- Production companies: GunHil; Cyborn
- Distributed by: ARRI Media
- Release date: 2 February 2018 (Iceland)
- Running time: 82 minutes
- Countries: Iceland; Belgium
- Languages: Icelandic; English
- Budget: $6,110,461

Ploey: You Never Fly Alone (Icelandic: Lói: Þú flýgur aldrei einn; released in some European countries as Flying the Nest) is a 2018 animated adventure film directed by Árni Ásgeirsson and written by Friðrik Erlingsson. The film score was composed by Atli Örvarsson.

The film was released in Iceland on 2 February 2018, and received favourable reviews from local critics, and had a worldwide gross of $6.1 million.

== Premise ==
A golden plover named Ploey has not learned to fly when his family migrates in the fall, meaning he must try to survive the vicious arctic winter by himself in order to be reunited with his family next spring. His life is hard for the plovers with the ever-present threat of being attacked by his predators, in particular a huge peregrine falcon named Shadow await the return of the golden plovers each spring for their food, the golden plover chicks have to learn how to dig for worms themselves and how to fly, unfortunately Ploey is afraid to fly. One day while plucking up the courage to fly, Ploey gets taken by Shadow. Ploey’s Dad comes to his rescue, but sadly is taken by Shadow in his place. When it comes time for the birds to migrate south, Ploey gets left behind, he decides to walk to Paradise Valley where the birds go to wait out the Arctic winter. Ploey meets many dangers along the way, including blizzards, hungry foxes, avalanches and ice drifts. He also meets Giron, an obese white ptarmigan, who comes to his aid and saves Ploey on several occasions. Luckily, some mice, a sheep, a goose, a weasel, a skua and a moose also help him to overcome his problems. Ploey finally reaches his destination where he is reunited with his Mother and his love interest Ploeveria.

== Production ==
The film was in production on and off for 7 years before being finished. The original working title was Ploe.

== Release ==
Ploey was released in Iceland on 2 February 2018, and in the UK on 6 June 2018. It grossed $281,303 in Iceland, contributing to a worldwide total of $6,110,461. The highest grossing country was France, which had a gross of $954,533.

Critically, the film was received generally negatively from critics. On review aggregator Rotten Tomatoes, Ploey holds an approval rating of 38% based on eight critical reviews.
