= The Lure (2015 film) =

2015 film by Agnieszka Smoczyńska

- Theatrical release poster
- Polish: Córki dancingu
- Directed by: Agnieszka Smoczyńska
- Screenplay by: Robert Bolesto
- Based on: The Little Mermaid by Hans Christian Andersen
- Produced by: Włodzimierz Niderhaus
- Starring: Kinga Preis; Michalina Olszańska; Marta Mazurek; Jakub Gierszał; Andrzej Konopka; Zygmunt Malanowicz; Marcin Kowalczyk; Magdalena Cielecka; Katarzyna Herman
- Cinematography: Jakub Kijowski
- Edited by: Jarosław Kamiński
- Music by: Ballady i Romanse
- Production companies: Wytwórnia Filmów Dokumentalnych i Fabularnych; Telewizja Polska S.A.; Platige Image S.A.
- Distributed by: Kino Świat
- Release date: 25 December 2015 (Poland)
- Running time: 92 minutes
- Country: Poland
- Language: Polish
- Box office: $108,846

The Lure (Polish: Córki dancingu, lit. 'Daughters of Dancing') is a 2015 Polish musical horror film directed by Agnieszka Smoczyńska and written by Robert Bolesto. It tells the story of two sirens who emerge from the waters and perform in a nightclub. One falls in love with a man, and gives up her tail, but loses her voice in the process. The story is a reworking of the 1837 fairy tale "The Little Mermaid" by Hans Christian Andersen, with inspiration from Smoczyńska's experiences. After premiering in Poland, the film screened at the 2016 Sundance Film Festival and Fantasia Film Festival to positive reviews.

== Plot ==
Some time in the 1980s, two sirens, Golden and Silver, encounter a rock band, Figs n' Dates, relaxing and playing music on a beach in Poland. They accompany the band back to the nightclub where they regularly perform and begin playing gigs there, performing as strippers and backup singers. The sirens soon become their own act, The Lure, with the band backing them. Golden murders a bar patron after a show one night and continues to thirst for blood; Silver falls in love with the bassist Mietek, but Mietek only sees her as a fish and not a woman.

Golden meets a Triton, a fellow sea creature and singer of a metal band, who informs her that if her sister falls in love and her love marries someone else, she will turn into sea foam; if she is to have her tail removed, she will lose her voice. When Golden's murder victim is discovered, one of the bandmates punches Silver and Golden, and it appears that they die. The bandmates roll their bodies in carpets and throw them into the river. But they return to the club, alive, and the band apologizes. Silver has her tail surgically replaced with a pair of legs to make Mietek love her back, but this makes her lose her singing voice. She tries to have sex with her new lower-half, but Mietek is disgusted when she gets blood on him from her surgery scars.

Mietek later meets a woman in a recording studio, whom he marries. The sisters attend the reception; Golden and the Triton warn Silver that she must eat Mietek before daybreak or she will become sea foam. Silver dances with Mietek, but cannot bring herself to eat him, and turns into sea foam in his arms. Distraught, Golden tears Mietek's throat out and returns to the ocean in full view of the entire wedding party.

== Cast ==
- Marta Mazurek as Silver
- Michalina Olszańska as Golden
- Kinga Preis as the nightclub singer
- Andrzej Konopka as the drummer
- Jakub Gierszał as the bass player
- Zygmunt Malanowicz as the house manager
- Magdalena Cielecka as Divine Furs (strip dancer)
- Katarzyna Herman as the militia lieutenant
- Marcin Kowalczyk as Triton / Daedalus
- Kaya Kołodziejczyk as Crystal

== Production ==
=== Writing ===
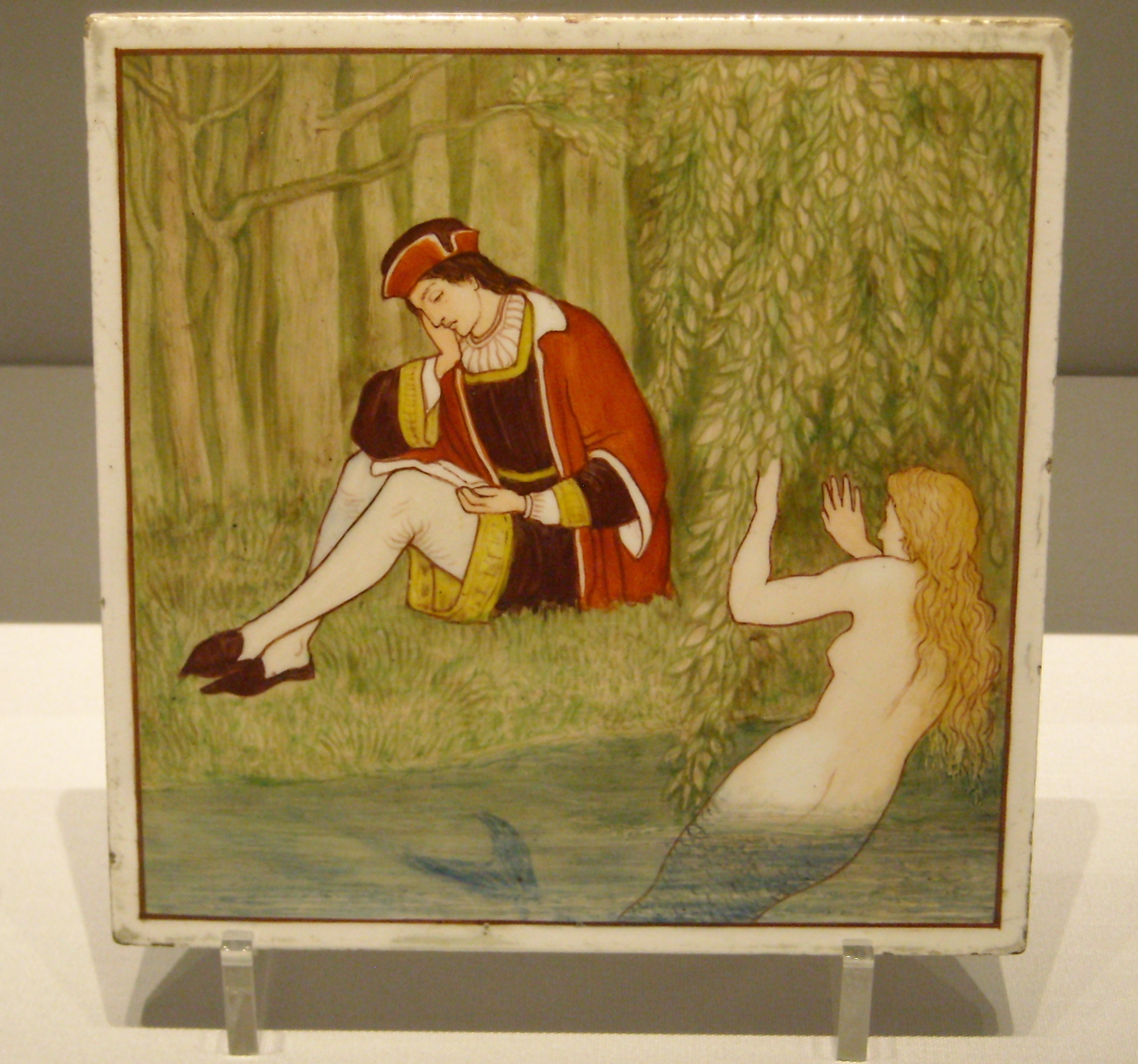
"The Little Mermaid" by Hans Christian Andersen influenced the story.

Director Agnieszka Smoczyńska called the film a "coming-of-age story", echoing her own youth. She recalled that her mother ran a nightclub, where she had her "first shot of vodka, first cigarette, first sexual disappointment and first important feeling for a boy." The mermaids were an abstraction that allowed her to tell her story without revealing too much of herself. The screenwriter Robert Bolesto sought to write a story based on two friends of his that frequented nightclubs in the 1980s, which enthused Smoczyńska and resonated with her own childhood.

Smoczyńska also wanted the film to be a retelling of "The Little Mermaid" by Hans Christian Andersen, and developed her idea of mermaids from tales of the 14th–16th century that described them as the sisters of dragons, and hence made them part monstrous. She invented their need to feed on human hearts and that propensity to attack the larynx of their victims.

=== Themes ===
Smoczyńska likened the mermaids to immigrants, abused by the locals (used in the sex industry) on their way to their real goal—America. She added they represent innocence, yet their odour and slime recalled girls maturing, "they menstruate, they ovulate, their bodies start smelling and feeling different." David Ehrlich of IndieWire, noting the mermaids' "bodies are a source of constant fascination", said that "The Lure is having some fun with chauvinist objectification; the film has a funny habit of lambasting dumb misogynist rhetoric by applying it literally."

== Release ==
The Lure was released in Poland on 25 December 2015. The film was later screened in the World Cinema Dramatic Competition section of the 2016 Sundance Film Festival and at the Fantasia International Film Festival.

In 2016, American art house distributor Janus Films acquired North American distribution rights to The Lure, for a limited theatrical release beginning on 1 February 2017. It was released on DVD and Blu-ray in Region A on 10 October 2017 by The Criterion Collection.

== Reception ==
=== Box office ===
The Lure garnered 14,899 admissions in its opening weekend in Poland from 112 cinemas, finishing at fifth place. The film earned 41,776 admissions in total.

On its North American opening weekend in February 2017, The Lure grossed $7,370 from one theatre. It finished its run on with a total gross of $101,657 in North America.

=== Critical response ===
The film had a mixed reception in Poland. On the review aggregator website Rotten Tomatoes, the film holds an approval rating of 89% based on 81 reviews, with an average rating of 7.2/10. The website's critics consensus reads, "The Lure adds a sexually charged, genre-defying twist to well-established mermaid lore, more than overpowering its flaws through sheer variety and wild ambition." Metacritic, which uses a weighted average, assigned the film a score of 72 out of 100, based on 19 critics, indicating "generally favorable" reviews.

Giuseppe Sedia of the Krakow Post wrote that Smoczynska's debut feature is a "cinematic act of love towards Poland's capital city in the 1980s with its sparkling neon signs, lighthearted nightlife, and ability to knock back gallons of vodka in its best days". Rubina Ramji, film editor and reviewer for the Journal of Religion and Film, described the film as a "rock opera, a horror movie and fairytale story about mermaids all rolled up into one". Guy Lodge of Variety praised it for its originality, describing it as "never less than arresting, and sometimes even a riot". However, he felt the screenplay lacked ideas in portraying the mermaids' vampiric attributes, and was unsure of the film's 1980s setting and whether it alluded to the politics of the time. IndieWire critic David Ehrlich gave it a B+, calling it "the best goth musical about man-eating mermaids ever made".

=== Accolades ===
Award	Date of ceremony	Category	Recipient(s)	Result	Ref(s)
Calgary Underground Film Festival	2016	Best Narrative Feature	Agnieszka Smoczyńska	Won	
Fantasporto	2016	Best Film	Agnieszka Smoczyńska	Won	
Gdynia Film Festival	2015	Best Debut Picture	Agnieszka Smoczyńska	Won	
Nashville Film Festival	22 April 2016	Special Jury Prize for Music	Agnieszka Smoczyńska	Won	
Nashville Film Festival	22 April 2016	Graveyard Shift Grand Jury Prize	Agnieszka Smoczyńska	Won	
Nashville Film Festival	22 April 2016	Graveyard Shift Special Jury Prize – Actress	Marta Mazurek	Won	
Nashville Film Festival	22 April 2016	Steven Goldmann Visionary Award	Agnieszka Smoczyńska	Won	
Sundance Film Festival	21–31 January 2016	Special Jury Award for Unique Vision and Design	Agnieszka Smoczyńska	Won	

== See also ==
- Siren, an American supernatural TV drama with a similar plot.
