= Jan Hrynkiewicz =

Polish actor and musician (born 1996)

- Born: 21 April 1996 (age 30)
- Citizenship: Polish
- Occupations: Actor, musician

Jan Hrynkiewicz (born 21 April 1996) is a Polish actor and musician.

== Biography ==
He comes from Lublin. As a young person he performed in Lublin cultural centers. In 2020, he graduated from the Acting Department of the National Film School in Łódź (diploma film Nothing Dies, directed by Kalina Alabrudzińska). He was a co-founder of the band Wind Dreamers. He settled in Warsaw's Praga district. He enjoys reading, making vegan food, listening to vinyl records and climbing the wall. For the role of Bartek in The Elephant (2022) he earned nomination for the Zbyszek Cybulski Award.

== Filmography ==
- Carte blanche as Kacper's pupil (2015)
- The Teacher, TV series, as Stefan Lasota (2017)
- Ułaskawienie as corporal (2018)
- The Crown of the Kings as Louis I of Hungary (2018–2020)
- Piłsudski jako Fijałkowski (2019)
- Nic nie ginie jako Przemek (2019)
- The Hater as Maciej Karpiuk, Tomek's roommate in the dormitory (2020)
- Osiecka, TV series, as Witold Dąbrowski, ep. 2, 4, 5, 9 (2020)
- Frieden, TV series, as Herszele (2020)
- Król, TV series, as Jan „Kum" Kaplica in his youth (2020)
- Corpus Christi as „Matys" (2019)
- Pitbull as „Sobol" (2021)
- Bracia as Chaim Tykociński, brother of Abram (2021)
- The Elephant as Bartek (2022)
- Handtering av udode as Peter (2023)
- Dewajtis, TV series, as Witold Czertwan, Marek's half-brother (2023)
- Feedback, TV series, as Krystian Lolewski „Loluś", friend of Piotr (2023)
- Breslau (TV series), as Abram Niepold (2025)

Source.

== Theatre ==
- Bierki, Akademicki Ośrodek Inicjatyw Artystycznych w Łodzi, directed by Maciej Kowalewski, as Paweł, 2017,
- Śliskie słowa, National Film School in Łódź, directed by Artur Urbański, as Silk Boy, 2019,
- Przygody Tomka Sawyera (The Adventures of Tom Sawyer), Teatr Miejski w Gliwicach, directed by Krzysztof Materna, as Tomek, 2020,
- Książę Niezłomny, Helena Modrzejewska National Old Theatre, directed by Małgorzata Warsicka, 2022.

Source.
