= Weronika Bilska =

Cinematographer, film editor and screenwriter (born 1983)

- Born: 16 May 1983 (age 43)
- Occupations: cinematographer, film editor and screenwriter

Weronika Bilska (born 16 May 1983) is a cinematographer, film editor and screenwriter.

== Biography ==
In 2011 she graduated in cinematography from the Katowice Film School.

== Filmography ==
As cinematographer.

- Podróż do zielonych cieni (documentary film; 2009)
- Mój tata Lazaro (documentary film; 2011)
- Gwizdek (documentary film; 2012)
- Inny film (documentary film; 2013)
- Powrót chemika (documentary film; 2014)
- Jak całkowicie zniknąć (2014)
- Kamper (2016)
- Fale (2016)
- Pionierzy (documentary film; 2018)
- Córka trenera (2018)
- O mnie się nie martw (TV series; 2019)
- Proste rzeczy (2020)
- Każdy ma swoje lato (2020)
- Moje wspaniałe życie (2021)
- Piosenki o miłości (2021)
- Bo we mnie jest seks (2021)
- Herkules (TV series; 2022)
- Belfer (TV series; 2024)
- Gang Zielonej Rękawiczki (TV series; 2024)
- Trzy miłości (also screenwriter; 2025)
- Proud (TV series; 2026)
- Tell Me What You Feel (2026)

== Accolades ==
In 2018 she received Jan Machulski Award for best cinematography for the film Więzi. She received special award at the Tarnów Film Award in 2022 for Moje wspaniałe życie and Piosenki o miłości.
