= Feedback (TV series) =

Polish drama television series

- Polish Netflix poster
- Polish: Informacja zwrotna
- Genre: Drama; Thriller
- Based on: Feedback by Jakub Żulczyk
- Written by: Kacper Wysocki; Jakub Żulczyk
- Directed by: Leszek Dawid
- Starring: Arkadiusz Jakubik; Jakub Sierenberg; Dominika Bednarczyk; Nel Kaczmarek; Przemysław Bluszcz; Juliusz Chrząstowski; Agata Wątróbska; Kamil Studnicki
- Composer: Olaf Deriglasoff
- Country of origin: Poland
- Original language: Polish
- No. of seasons: 1
- No. of episodes: 5

Production
- Executive producers: Łukasz Dzięcioł; Piotr Dzięcioł
- Cinematography: Paweł Flis
- Editors: Maciej Pawliński; Katarzyna Drozdowicz
- Running time: 43–55 minutes
- Production company: Opus TV

Original release
- Network: Netflix
- Release: 15 November 2023

Feedback (Polish: Informacja zwrotna) is a Polish drama television series based on the novel of the same name by Jakub Żulczyk. It was released on Netflix on 15 November 2023.

== Premise ==
An alcoholic former rock musician searches for his missing son in Warsaw.

== Cast ==
=== Main ===
- Arkadiusz Jakubik as Marcin Kania
- Jakub Sierenberg as Piotr Kania
- Dominika Bednarczyk-Krzyżanowska as Joanna "Asia" Kania
- Nel Kaczmarek as Ula Kania
- Przemysław Bluszcz as Commissioner Cezary Karłowicz
- Juliusz Chrząstowski as Jarek
- Agata Wątróbska as Sylwia
- Kamil Studnicki as "Cuguś"

=== Recurring ===
- Małgorzata Hajewska as Jadzia Rustowicz
- Andrzej Konopka as Zbyszek
- Mateusz Lisiecki-Waligórski as Kuba
- Marcin Kowalczyk as Tomaszek
- Damian Tomaszewski as "Wrona"
- Dawid Ambroziak as "Barti"
- Jan Hrynkiewicz as Krystian "Lolus" Lolewski
- Marta Mazurek as Kinga Kania
- Agata Turkot as Ewa Orszanska
- Dariusz Majchrzak as "Szatan"

== Episodes ==
No.	Title	Duration	Original release date
1	"Episode 1"	53 min	15 November 2023
2	"Episode 2"	43 min	15 November 2023
3	"Episode 3"	55 min	15 November 2023
4	"Episode 4"	55 min	15 November 2023
5	"Episode 5"	48 min	15 November 2023

== Release ==
A teaser trailer for the series was released on 14 September 2023. The official trailer was released on 30 October 2023.
