= Queen (2022 miniseries) =

Polish drama television miniseries

- Polish Netflix poster
- Polish: Królowa
- Genre: Drama
- Created by: Árni Ólafur Ásgeirsson
- Written by: Árni Ólafur Ásgeirsson; Ottó Geir Borg; Kacper Wysocki
- Directed by: Łukasz Kośmicki
- Starring: Andrzej Seweryn; Maria Peszek; Julia Chętnicka; Piotr Witkowski; Kova Réa; Paweł Koślik; Antoni Porowski
- Composer: Mikolai Stroinski
- Country of origin: Poland
- Original languages: Polish; French; English
- No. of episodes: 4

Production
- Producers: Łukasz Dzięcioł; Piotr Dzięcioł
- Cinematography: Wojciech Szepel
- Editor: Leszek Starzyński
- Running time: 45–53 minutes
- Production company: Opus TV

Original release
- Network: Netflix
- Release: 23 June 2022

Queen (Polish: Królowa) is a 2022 Polish drama television miniseries created by Árni Ólafur Ásgeirsson, loosely based on the life of Polish hairdresser Antoni Cierplikowski. It was released on Netflix on 23 June 2022.

== Premise ==
A Polish tailor and drag queen living in Paris returns to his hometown in Lower Silesia to make amends with his daughter.

== Cast ==
- Andrzej Seweryn as Sylwester Borkowski/Loretta
- Maria Peszek as Wioletta Nowak
- Julia Chętnicka as Izabela Nowak
- Piotr Witkowski as Bruno Adamski
- Kova Réa as Corentin
- Paweł Koślik as Ziutek
- Henryk Niebudek as Patryk Adamski
- Paweł Prokopczuk as Sebastian Adamski
- Łukasz Gawroński as Darek Adamski
- Wiktoria Kruszczyńska as Baska
- Grzegorz Czerepak as Marcel
- Paweł Niczewski as Józef
- Wojciech Andrzejuk as Morus
- Jan Wojtynski as Gacek
- Filip Budweil as Zdzisław
- Justyna Ducka as Renata
- Antoni Porowski as Antoine

== Episodes ==
No.	Title	Duration	Original release date
1	"Episode 1"	53 min	23 June 2022
2	"Episode 2"	46 min	23 June 2022
3	"Episode 3"	45 min	23 June 2022
4	"Episode 4"	50 min	23 June 2022

== Production ==
Polish-Icelandic filmmaker Árni Ólafur Ásgeirsson loosely based the series on the life of Antoni Cierplikowski, owner of Antoine de Paris. Although Cierplikowski himself was not a drag queen, he was a gay man who had moved from Poland to Paris, became an extremely successful hairdresser, and returned to Poland at the end of his life. Ásgeirsson died in April 2021 before the series had finished production; the series is dedicated to his memory.

The series was filmed in Wrocław and Nowa Ruda in 2021. Exterior shots of a clothing factory in Gryfów Śląski are also featured in the series.

== Reception ==
Reviewing the series' pilot episode, Joel Keller of Decider wrote that "Queen is a gentle but powerful drama about a man who thought he was sure of who he is discovering things about himself at a late age, and being the better for it."
