= Absolute Beginners (TV series) =

Polish teen drama television series

- Netflix poster
- Polish: Absolutni debiutanci
- Genre: Teen drama; Romantic drama
- Created by: Nina Lewandowska; Kamila Tarabura
- Written by: Nina Lewandowska; Kamila Tarabura; Jędrzej Napiecek
- Directed by: Kamila Tarabura; Katarzyna Warzecha
- Starring: Martyna Byczkowska; Bartłomiej Deklewa; Jan Sałasiński; Paulina Krzyżańska; Katarzyna Warnke; Piotr Witkowski; Anna Krotoska; Andrzej Konopka; Julian Świeżewski
- Country of origin: Poland
- Original language: Polish
- No. of seasons: 1
- No. of episodes: 6

Production
- Producer: Magdalena Zielska
- Cinematography: Tomasz Naumiuk
- Running time: 43–54 minutes
- Production company: ATM Grupa

Original release
- Network: Netflix
- Release: 25 October 2023 – present

Absolute Beginners (Polish: Absolutni debiutanci) is a Polish teen drama television series starring Martyna Byczkowska and Bartłomiej Deklewa. It was released on Netflix on 25 October 2023.

== Premise ==
Lena and Niko travel to the Polish seaside to make an admissions film for their dream film school. There, they meet a boy who will put their friendship to the test.

== Cast ==
=== Main ===
- Martyna Byczkowska as Lena Głowacka, an autistic teenager and Niko's best friend
- Bartłomiej Deklewa as Niko, Lena's best friend
- Jan Sałasiński as Igor Tymczenko, a promising young basketball player from Silesia who is attending a basketball camp on the coast
- Paulina Krzyżańska as Malwina, Igor's summer fling and Niko's friend
- Katarzyna Warnke as Tamara, Lena's mother
- Piotr Witkowski as Dawid, Lena's stepfather
- Anna Krotoska as Bogusia, Niko's mother
- Andrzej Konopka as Paweł, Niko's father
- Julian Świeżewski as Marcin, Igor's coach

=== Recurring ===
- Maciej Kosiacki as Jacek
- Jakub Wieczorek as "Ryba", Malwina's father
- Ewa Ekwa as Wika
- Maciej Maleńczuk as the campsite owner
- Mariusz Bonaszewski as the club president

=== Guest ===
- Agnieszka Holland as the chairwoman of the examination committee
- Agnieszka Smoczyńska as a member of the examination committee
- Xawery Żuławski as a member of the examination committee
- Natalia Fiedorczuk as a member of the examination committee
- Łukasz Maciejewski as a member of the examination committee
- Jerzy Matula as a member of the examination committee

== Episodes ==
No.	Title	Duration	Original release date
1	"Episode 1"	46 min	25 October 2023
2	"Episode 2"	46 min	25 October 2023
3	"Episode 3"	48 min	25 October 2023
4	"Episode 4"	43 min	25 October 2023
5	"Episode 5"	45 min	25 October 2023
6	"Episode 6"	54 min	25 October 2023

== Production ==
The series was shot in Ustka, Sopot, and Hel.

== Release ==
The series' first season was released on Netflix on 25 October 2023.

== Reception ==
Reviewing the series' first episode, Joel Keller of Decider wrote, "With some interesting lead performances, and a plot that goes beyond the standard teen coming-of-age stuff, Absolute Beginners sets up an intriguing story about teens who either aren't sure about what they want or are sure but have trouble expressing it."
