= Go Ahead, Brother =

Polish crime thriller television series

- Netflix poster
- Polish: Idź przodem, bracie
- Genre: Crime thriller
- Written by: Kacper Wysocki
- Directed by: Maciej Pieprzyca
- Starring: Piotr Witkowski; Konrad Eleryk; Mirosław Haniszewski; Jakub Wesołowski; Sebastian Dela; Andrzej Popiel
- Country of origin: Poland
- Original language: Polish
- No. of episodes: 6

Production
- Producer: Łukasz Dzięcioł
- Running time: 52–62 minutes
- Production company: OPUS TV

Original release
- Network: Netflix
- Release: 30 October 2024 – present

Go Ahead, Brother (Polish: Idź przodem, bracie) is a Polish crime thriller television series starring Piotr Witkowski, Konrad Eleryk, Mirosław Haniszewski, Jakub Wesołowski, Sebastian Dela, and Andrzej Popiel. It was released on Netflix on 30 October 2024.

== Premise ==
After being kicked out of the counterterrorist unit SPAP, Oskar Gwiazda pushes his father to suicide and takes on his debts. He struggles to settle into his new job as a security guard until he finds an employment opportunity elsewhere.

== Cast ==
- Piotr Witkowski as Oskar Gwiazda
- Konrad Eleryk as Sylwester Zajfert
- Mirosław Haniszewski as Marecki
- Jakub Wesołowski as "Rudy"
- Sebastian Dela as "Gemboj"
- Andrzej Popiel as Gołaś
- Aleksandra Adamska as Marta Gwiazda-Zajfert
- Marcin Kowalczyk as Damian Czorny
- Piotr Adamczyk as Eryk Tomczyk
- Cezary Żak as Mieczysław Czorny
- Anastasiya Pustovit as Jewa

== Episodes ==
No.	Title	Duration	Original release date
1	"Episode 1"	62 min	30 October 2024
2	"Episode 2"	56 min	30 October 2024
3	"Episode 3"	58 min	30 October 2024
4	"Episode 4"	57 min	30 October 2024
5	"Episode 5"	52 min	30 October 2024
Under attack, the entire family finds themselves trapped — with Marta's unborn child at the center of the danger. Sylwek is captured by Marecki, becomes a prisoner and is brutally tortured for information — e.g. treated with high-voltage electric shocks, beaten sadistically.
6	"Episode 6"	62 min	30 October 2024

== Production ==
The series was announced in 2022. The script had been written specifically with Piotr Witkowski and Konrad Eleryk in mind for the two lead roles.

Prior to filming, the actors trained with the GROM Military Unit for three months. The series was shot in Ostrołęka and the Piotrkowska Tram Station in Łódź in mid-2023.

== Release ==
The series was released on Netflix on 30 October 2024. In April 2026, the series was renewed for a second season with a planned release date of 2027.
