= Jan Sałasiński =

Actor

- Education: Aleksander Zelwerowicz National Academy of Dramatic Art
- Occupation: Actor

Jan Sałasiński is an actor.

== Biography ==
In 2026 he graduated in acting from the Aleksander Zelwerowicz National Academy of Dramatic Art.

== Filmography ==
Source.

- Absolute Beginners (TV series; 2023) as Igor Tymchenko, a young basketball player from Silesia who is attending a basketball camp on the coast
- Green Border (2023) as soldier
- Vinci 2 as Jan Bednarek jr.
- Tell Me What You Feel (2026) as Patryk
- Colors of Evil: Black (2026) as prosecutor

== Accolades ==
In 2026, he received best acting debut award at the Polish Film Festival for his role in Tell Me What You Feel.
