= The Office PL =

Polish mockumentary television series (2021–present)

- Polish poster
- Genre: Mockumentary; Sitcom
- Based on: The Office
- Written by: Michał Marczak; Magdalena Załęcka; Jakub Rużyłło; Łukasz Sychowicz; Mateusz Zimnowodzki
- Directed by: Maciej Bochniak
- Starring: Piotr Polak; Vanessa Aleksander; Adam Woronowicz; Kornelia Strzelecka; Monika Kulczyk; Milena Lisiecka; Marcin Pempuś; Jan Sobolewski
- Country of origin: Poland
- Original language: Polish
- No. of seasons: 5
- No. of episodes: 60

Production
- Producer: Maciej Bochniak
- Cinematography: Paweł Chorzępa
- Editors: Nikodem Chabior; Alan Zejer
- Running time: 23–31 minutes
- Production company: Jake Vision DGA Studio

Original release
- Network: Canal+
- Release: 22 October 2021 – present

The Office PL is a Polish mockumentary sitcom television series. It is an adaptation of the British television series The Office. It began airing on Canal+ on 22 October 2021.

== Premise ==
The series follows the everyday antics of the employees of the Kropliczanka mineral water company in Siedlce.

== Cast ==
=== Main ===
- Piotr Polak as Michał Holc
- Vanessa Aleksander as Patrycja Kowalska
- Adam Woronowicz as Dariusz "Darek" Wasiak
- Kornelia Strzelecka as Asia Kasprzyk
- Monika Kulczyk as Agnieszka Majewska
- Milena Lisiecka as Bożena Grabowska
- Marcin Pempuś as Levan Kobiaszwili
- Jan Sobolewski as Sebastian Sołtys
- Monika Obara as Gosia Uszyńska
- Rafał Kowalski as Adam Szeliga (season 2-present)
- Adam Bobik as Łukasz "Łuki" Gnatowski
- Daria Widawska as Marzena Krupska (season 2)
- Mikołaj Matczak as Franek Wójcik (season 1)
- Małgorzata Gorol as Kasia Płaczkiewicz (season 3)
- Mateusz Król as Tomek "Regan" Grabowski (season 3–present)

=== Recurring ===
- Jakub Zając as Paweł Szod
- Sonia Bohosiewicz as Danuta Wasiak, Darek's wife

=== Guest ===
- Dawid Podsiadło as himself
- Tomasz Sapryk as Kowalski, Patrycja's father and the owner of Kropliczanka
- Maja Ostaszewska as Arleta Mosul
- Ewa Serwa as Sebastian's mother
- Barbara Kurzaj as the cat owner
- Julia Wieniawa as herself
- Joanna Kulig as Michalina Biegun (season 5)

== Episodes ==
=== Series overview ===
Series	Episodes	Originally released	
Series	Episodes	First released	Last released
1	12	22 October 2021	
2	12	4 November 2022	
3	12	3 November 2023	24 November 2023
4	12	25 October 2024	15 November 2024
5	12	14 November 2025	5 December 2025

=== Season 1 ===
No. overall	No. in season	Title	Duration	Original release date
1	1	"Pilot"	27 min	22 October 2021
2	2	"Refreshing"	27 min	22 October 2021
3	3	"No to szkło"	26 min	22 October 2021
4	4	"Chrzest"	26 min	22 October 2021
5	5	"Równouprawnienie"	26 min	22 October 2021
6	6	"Klient"	27 min	22 October 2021
7	7	"Broda"	26 min	22 October 2021
8	8	"Strona WWW"	28 min	22 October 2021
9	9	"Tolerancja"	26 min	22 October 2021
10	10	"Stażystka"	26 min	22 October 2021
11	11	"Krzyż"	25 min	22 October 2021
12	12	"Prezentacja"	28 min	22 October 2021

=== Season 2 ===
No. overall	No. in season	Title	Duration	Original release date
13	1	"Parapetówka"	29 min	4 November 2022
14	2	"Kurs BHP"	26 min	4 November 2022
15	3	"Porno"	26 min	4 November 2022
16	4	"Dzieciaki"	25 min	4 November 2022
17	5	"Wizyta"	27 min	4 November 2022
18	6	"Kartka dla Michała"	26 min	4 November 2022
19	7	"Młodzieżowy wyraz roku"	26 min	4 November 2022
20	8	"Wadliwa partia"	25 min	4 November 2022
21	9	"Pożegnania"	27 min	4 November 2022
22	10	"Helloween"	26 min	4 November 2022
23	11	"Powrót Gosi"	25 min	4 November 2022
24	12	"Piknik"	31 min	4 November 2022

=== Season 3 ===
No. overall	No. in season	Title	Duration	Original release date
25	1	"Big News"	28 min	3 November 2023
26	2	"Test IQ"	27 min	3 November 2023
27	3	"Asystent"	27 min	3 November 2023
28	4	"Ono"	26 min	10 November 2023
29	5	"Wywiad"	25 min	10 November 2023
30	6	"Widzenie"	23 min	10 November 2023
31	7	"Wykład"	26 min	17 November 2023
32	8	"Furgonetka"	24 min	17 November 2023
33	9	"Święta"	27 min	17 November 2023
34	10	"Blue Monday"	26 min	24 November 2023
35	11	"Trzydziestka"	25 min	24 November 2023
36	12	"Walentynki"	28 min	24 November 2023

=== Season 4 ===
No. overall	No. in season	Title	Duration	Original release date
37	1	"2 kwietnia"	28 min	25 October 2024
38	2	"Syn"	27 min	25 October 2024
39	3	"Powrót Łukiego"	27 min	25 October 2024
40	4	"Rower"	23 min	1 November 2024
41	5	"Test wody"	26 min	1 November 2024
42	6	"Straż pożarna"	25 min	1 November 2024
43	7	"Fifka"	27 min	8 November 2024
44	8	"Urząd"	23 min	8 November 2024
45	9	"Open Mic"	26 min	8 November 2024
46	10	"Jazda polska"	25 min	15 November 2024
47	11	"Ty, Brutusie"	25 min	15 November 2024
48	12	"Dni Siedlec"	29 min	15 November 2024

=== Season 5 ===
No. overall	No. in season	Title	Duration	Original release date
49	1	"Co nowego?"	26 min	14 November 2025
50	2	"Chłopak Asi"	24 min	14 November 2025
51	3	"Umowa śmieciowa"	24 min	14 November 2025
52	4	"Michał Jordan"	25 min	21 November 2025
53	5	"Debata"	27 min	21 November 2025
54	6	"Randka"	23 min	21 November 2025
55	7	"Dzień bez telefonu"	22 min	28 November 2025
56	8	"Marina Siedlce"	23 min	28 November 2025
57	9	"Tadek"	23 min	28 November 2025
58	10	"Strzelnica"	22 min	5 December 2025
59	11	"Wiadomość w butelce"	25 min	5 December 2025
60	12	"Rada miasta"	22 min	5 December 2025

== Production ==
Filming for the first season of the series began in July 2021.
