= Vitalik Havryla =

Ukrainian actor (born 1998)

- Born: 1998; Ukraine, near Lviv
- Occupation: Actor

Vitalik Havryla (born 1998) is a film and theatre actor.

== Biography ==
He was born and raised in a village near Lviv, Ukraine. His family lives in a village 40 kilometeres from the Polish-Ukrainian border. His great-grandfather was Polish. He moved to Poland after graduating from high school, because his family did not accept that he wanted to become an actor. Before pursuing acting, he studied journalism and media studies at the University of Warsaw and worked in corporate. He passed the exams for acting school on his second attempt. He described the time after the Russian invasion of Ukraine on 22 February 2022, as his "worst semester in college. It was the worst spring. I was like crazy." In 2025 he graduated from the Acting Department of the Academy of Theatre Arts in Kraków; vocal and acting specialization.

== Filmography ==
- Dystans (2021), TV film, as Bartek
- Bunt! (2022), TV series, episode 22, as Emil
- Tam gdzie płaczką ptaki (2023), short film
- Sortownia (2023), TV series, episode 7, as detained
- Metaliczny posmak (2023), short film, as a boy
- BringBackAlice (2023), TV series, as Janek
- Na Wspólnej (2023–2025), TV series, as Natan Sobierajski, episodes 3801, 3803, 3807, 3811–3812, 3819–3820, 3824–3825, 3830, 3832–3834, 3958–3962
- Pani od polskiego (2024) as Stach Iwaszko

== Theatre work ==
- Czerwone i czarne (Łaźnia Nowa Theatre, directed by Bartosz Szydłowski, 2023)
- Pół żarciem, pół serio (AST National Academy of Theatre Arts in Kraków, directed by Kalina Dębska, 2024)
- Na kolana, panie Wyspiański! (Wawel Castle, directed by Agata Duda-Gracz, 2024) as Dawid
- Amadeusz (Teatr Nowy Proxima w Krakowie, directed by Piotr Sieklucki, 2024) as Amadeusz
- Rent (Krakowski Teatr Variété, directed by Jakub Wocial, Santiago Bello, 2024)
- Uroczystość (Ludowy Theatre in Kraków, directed by Małgorzata Bogajewska, 2025) as Sviatoslav, Helene's boyfriend
- Pan Tadeusz (Juliusz Słowacki Theatre, directed by Wojtek Klemm, 2025) as Tadeusz

== Awards ==
- Loża Award of the Union of Polish Stage Artists for best young actor for the role in a theatrical performance Amadeusz (2025)
