= Into the Wind (2022 film) =

- Polish: Pod wiatr
- Directed by: Kristoffer Rus
- Written by: Julian Kijowski
- Starring: Sonia Mietielica; Jakub Sasak
- Production company: RE Studio
- Distributed by: Netflix
- Release date: 10 February 2022
- Running time: 107 minutes
- Country: Poland
- Language: Polish

Into the Wind (Polish: Pod wiatr) is a 2022 Polish film directed by Kristoffer Rus in his feature film debut, written by Julian Kijowski and starring Sonia Mietielica and Jakub Sasak.

== Plot ==
A medical student and a kitesurfing instructor strike up a summer romance in Hel.

== Cast ==
- Sonia Mietielica as Ania
- Jakub Sasak as Michal
- Bitamina
- Sonia Bohosiewicz
- Jakub Czachor
- Sebastian Dela
- Karol Dziuba
- Wojciech Gassowski
- Waleria Gorobets
- Jakub Kuzia
- Grzegorz Malecki
- Marta Ojrzynska
- Ilona Ostrowska
- Marcin Perchuc
- Wlodzimierz Press
- Kornelia Strzelecka
- Agnieszka Zulewska
