= Agnieszka Smoczyńska =

Polish filmmaker, writer and director (born 1978)

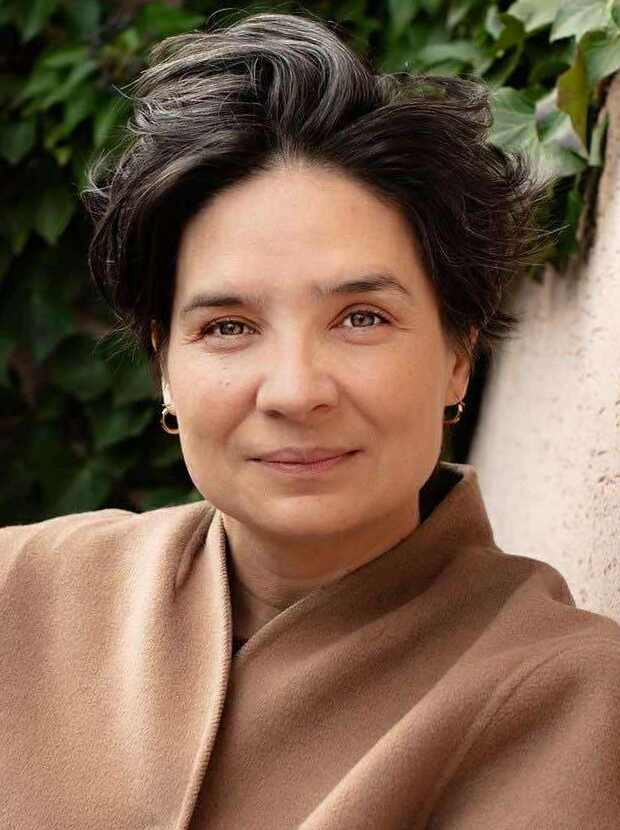
- Smoczyńska in 2024
- Born: May 18, 1978 (age 48); Wrocław, Poland
- Education: Krzysztof Kieślowski Film School
- Occupations: Filmmaker, writer, director
- Years active: 2003-present
- Spouse: Andrzej Konopka
- Children: 2
- Awards: Golden Lions (2022)

Agnieszka Smoczyńska (Polish: [aɡˈɲɛʂka smɔˈt͡ʂɨj̃ska]; born 18 May 1978) is a Polish film and television writer and director. She is an alumna of the Krzysztof Kieślowski Film School in Katowice. Her debut feature film, The Lure (2015), was re-released by The Criterion Collection in 2017, also including the short films Aria Diva (2007) and Viva Maria! (2010). In 2022, she won Golden Lions Award at the Gdynia Film Festival for her 4th feature, The Silent Twins.

== Filmography ==
Short film

Year	Title	Director	Writer	Notes
2003	Sciana	Yes	No	
2003	Kapelusz	Yes	Yes	
2003	Guanipa	Yes	Yes	
2004	3 Love	Yes	Yes	
2005	Krótki film o nauczycielu muzyki	Yes	Yes	
2007	Aria diva	Yes	Yes	
2018	The Kindler and the Virgin	Yes	No	Segment of The Field Guide to Evil

Documentary short

Year	Title	Director	Writer
2005	Sieroty	Yes	Yes
2005	Artykul 567	Yes	Yes
2010	Viva Maria!	Yes	Yes

Television

Year	Title	Notes
2004	Teatr Telewizji	Segment "Sceny z powstania" (Also writer)
2012-2013	Wszystko przed nami	99 episodes
2013-2014	Na dobre i na zle	6 episodes
2016	Wasza Wysokosc	TV movie
2018	1983	Episode "Mayday"
2020	Warrior Nun	Episodes "Ephesians 6:11" and "Ecclesiasticus 26:9-10"

Feature film

- The Lure (2015)
- Fugue (2018)
- The Silent Twins (2022)
- Hot Spot (2026)
