= Recipe For Life =

- Genre: Comedy drama
- Created by: Agnieszka Pilaszewska
- Written by: Agnieszka Pilaszewska
- Directed by: Michał Rogalski
- Starring: Magdalena Kumorek; Piotr Adamczyk; Borys Szyc; Edyta Olszówka; Maja Ostaszewska; Aleksandra Radwańska; Dorota Kolak
- Opening theme: Oceana - "As Sweet As You"
- Composer: Krzesimir Dębski
- Country of origin: Poland
- No. of series: 5
- No. of episodes: 65 (list of episodes)

Production
- Executive producer: Dariusz Gąsiorowski
- Producers: Marta Grela-Gorostiza; Katarzyna Dobrzyńska; Michał Kwiecieński; Magdalena Badura
- Cinematography: Paweł Flis
- Running time: 60 minutes (with adverts), 42-45 minutes (without adverts)
- Production company: Akson Studio

Original release
- Network: TVN
- Release: 6 March 2011 – 24 November 2013

Przepis na życie (English Recipe For Life) is a Polish comedy-drama television series produced by Akson Studio for the TVN network. The series was created and written by Polish actress Agnieszka Pilaszewska.

== Premise ==
The main character is a middle-aged woman whose life changes when her husband leaves her and she loses her job. The only activity that can make her feel better is cooking. This is her passion. The storyline follows her fate, as well as her daughter's and ex-husband's who is now with another woman.

== Cast ==
- Magdalena Kumorek as Anka Zawadzka
- Aleksandra Radwańska as Mania Zawadzka
- Dorota Kolak as Irena
- Piotr Adamczyk as Andrzej Zawadzki
- Edyta Olszówka as Pola
- Maja Ostaszewska as Beata Darmieta
- Dominika Gwit as Gruba
- Paweł Marczuk as Grochol
- Borys Szyc as Jerzy Knape
- Lesław Żurek as Maciek
- Jakub Mazurek as Leszek
- Iwona Bielska as Wanda
- Wojciech Duryasz as Karol
- Sławomir Orzechowski as Stefan
- Jerzy Fedorowicz as General, Beata's father

== Episodes ==
Series	Episodes	Timeslot	Originally released		TV season	Viewers (in millions)	Average share (16–49)
Series	Episodes	Timeslot	First released	Last released	TV season	Viewers (in millions)	Average share (16–49)
1	13	Sunday 9:25 p.m.	6 March 2011	29 May 2011	Spring 2011	3.17	25.8%
2	13	Tuesday 9:30 p.m.	6 September 2011	29 November 2011	Autumn 2011	2.84	25.6%
3	13	Tuesday 9:30 p.m.	6 March 2012	29 May 2012	Spring 2012	2.70	24.4%
4	13	Sunday 9:00 p.m.	24 February 2013	19 May 2013	Spring 2013	2.40	19.4%
5	13	Sunday 9:00 p.m.	1 September 2013	24 November 2013	Autumn 2013	2.27	19.3%

== International broadcast ==
Following the success in Poland, broadcast rights have been sold abroad. The series currently airs in China, Hungary, Slovakia and the countries of Middle East.

Country	Local title	TV network	Series premiere
China	TBA	CCTV	TBA
Hungary	Az élet sava-borsa	M1	18 November 2013
Middle East	Wasfat alsa'ada	Fox	Spring 2014
Slovakia	Recept na život	Jednotka	25 August 2014
Lithuania	Gyvenimo receptai	LNK	10 September 2014

=== Lithuanian version ===
The Lithuanian version of the series titled Gyvenimo receptai, featuring Donata Rinkevičienė, Inga Norkutė, Kristina Kazlauskaitė, Giedrius Arbačiauskas, Ridas Žirgulis, Lina Rastokaitė, Paulius Ignatavičius and Eglė Špokaitė as the main cast, premiered on September 10, 2014 LNK.
