= William V, Prince of Orange =

Prince of Orange from 1751 to 1806

William V
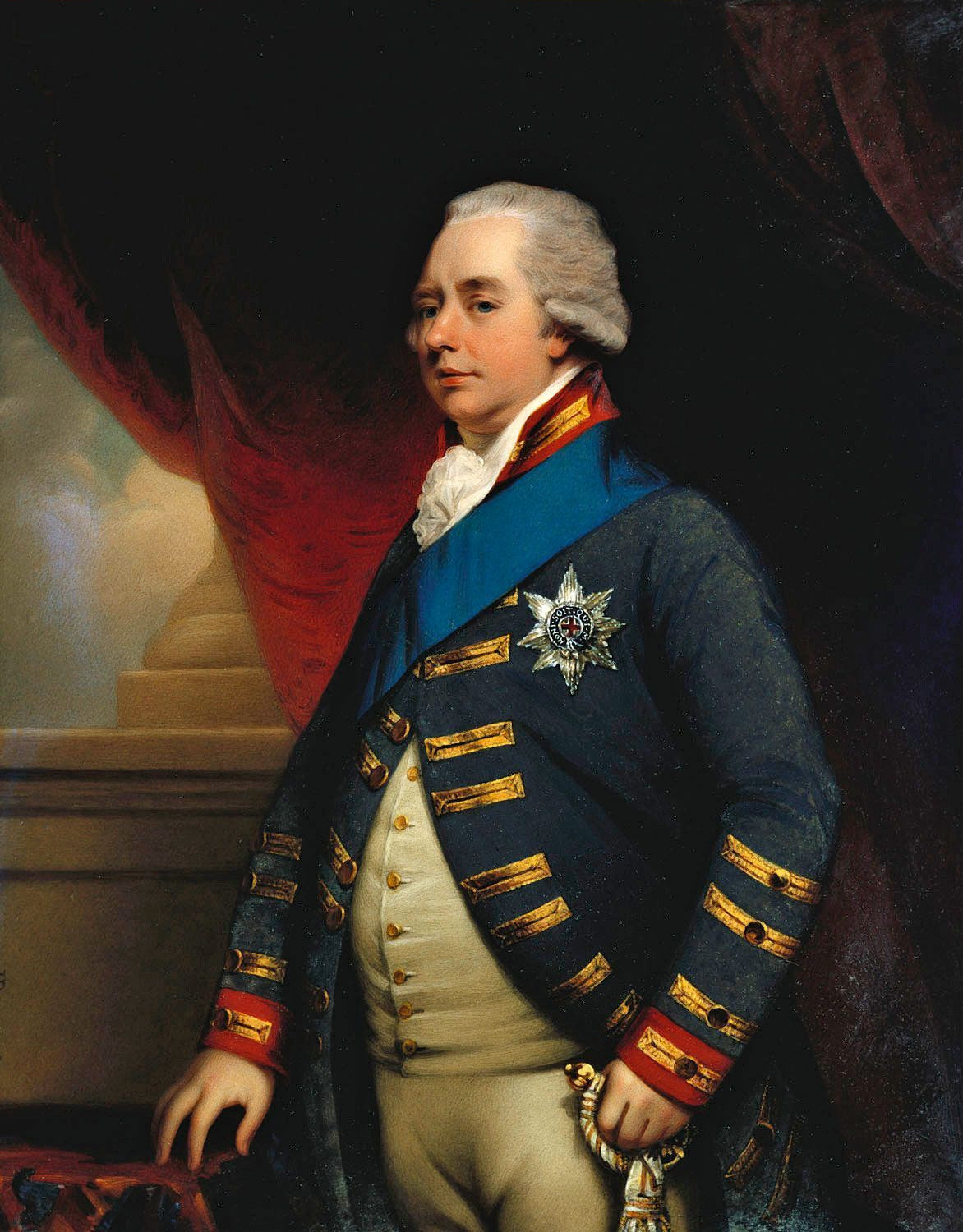
- Portrait by Henry Bone, c. 1801

Prince of Orange Prince of Orange-Nassau
- Reign: 22 October 1751 – 9 April 1806
- Predecessor: William IV
- Successor: William VI

Stadtholder of the United Provinces
- Reign: 22 October 1751 – 23 February 1795
- Predecessor: William IV
- Successor: Stadtholdership abolished (succeeded by the Revolutionary Committee of the Batavian Republic)
- Born: 8 March 1748; The Hague, Dutch Republic
- Died: 9 April 1806 (aged 58); Brunswick, Brunswick-Lüneburg
- Spouse: Princess Wilhelmina of Prussia (m. 1767)
- Issue: Louise, Hereditary Princess of Brunswick-Wolfenbüttel; William I of the Netherlands; Prince Frederick
Names
- Willem Batavus
- House: Orange-Nassau
- Father: William IV, Prince of Orange
- Mother: Anne, Princess Royal
- Religion: Dutch Reformed Church

William V (Willem Batavus; 8 March 1748 – 9 April 1806) was Prince of Orange and the last Stadtholder of the Dutch Republic. He went into exile to London in 1795.

== Early life ==
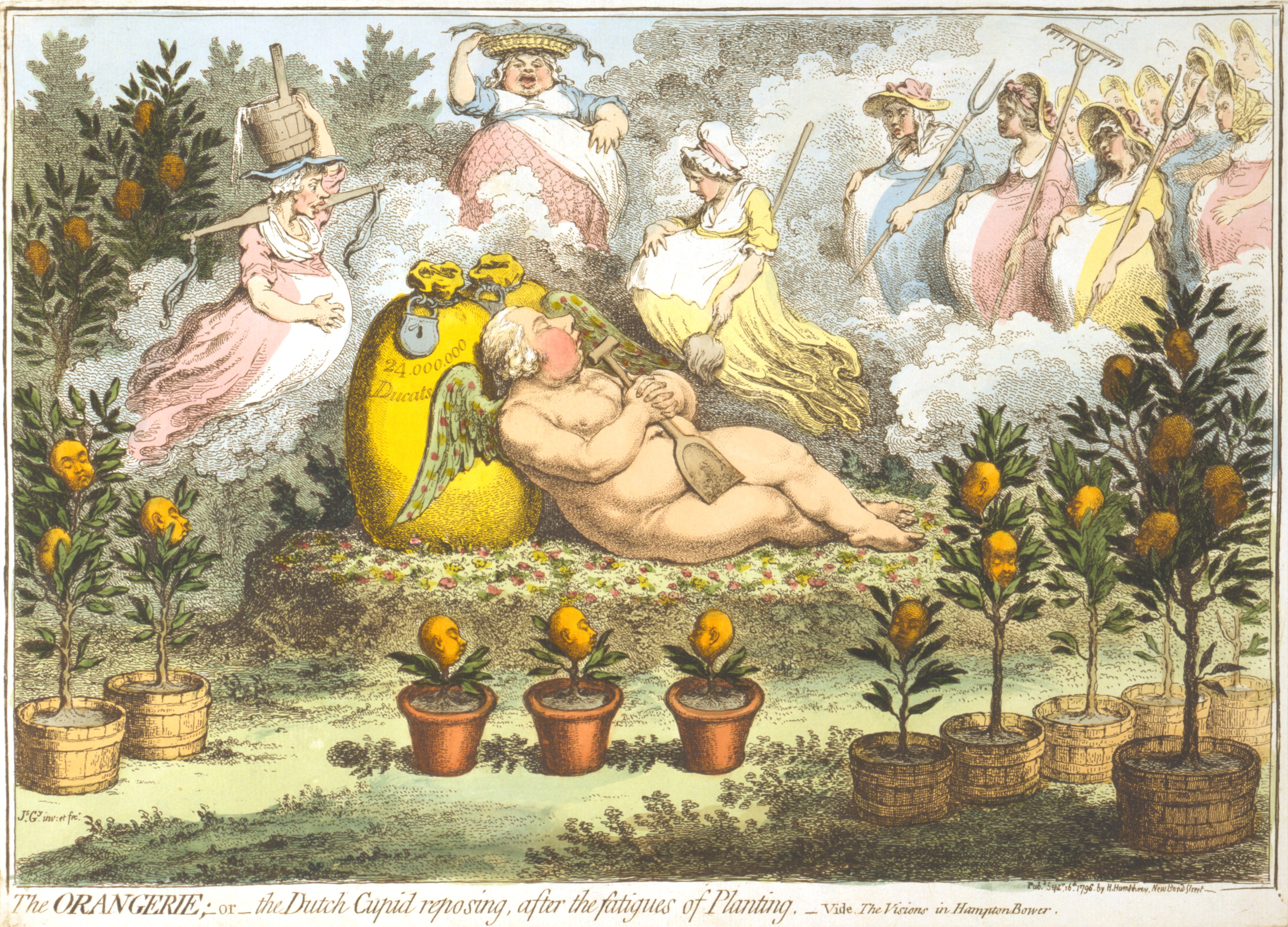
In The Orangerie (1796), James Gillray caricatured William's dalliances during his exile, depicting him as an indolent Cupid sleeping on bags of money, surrounded by pregnant amours

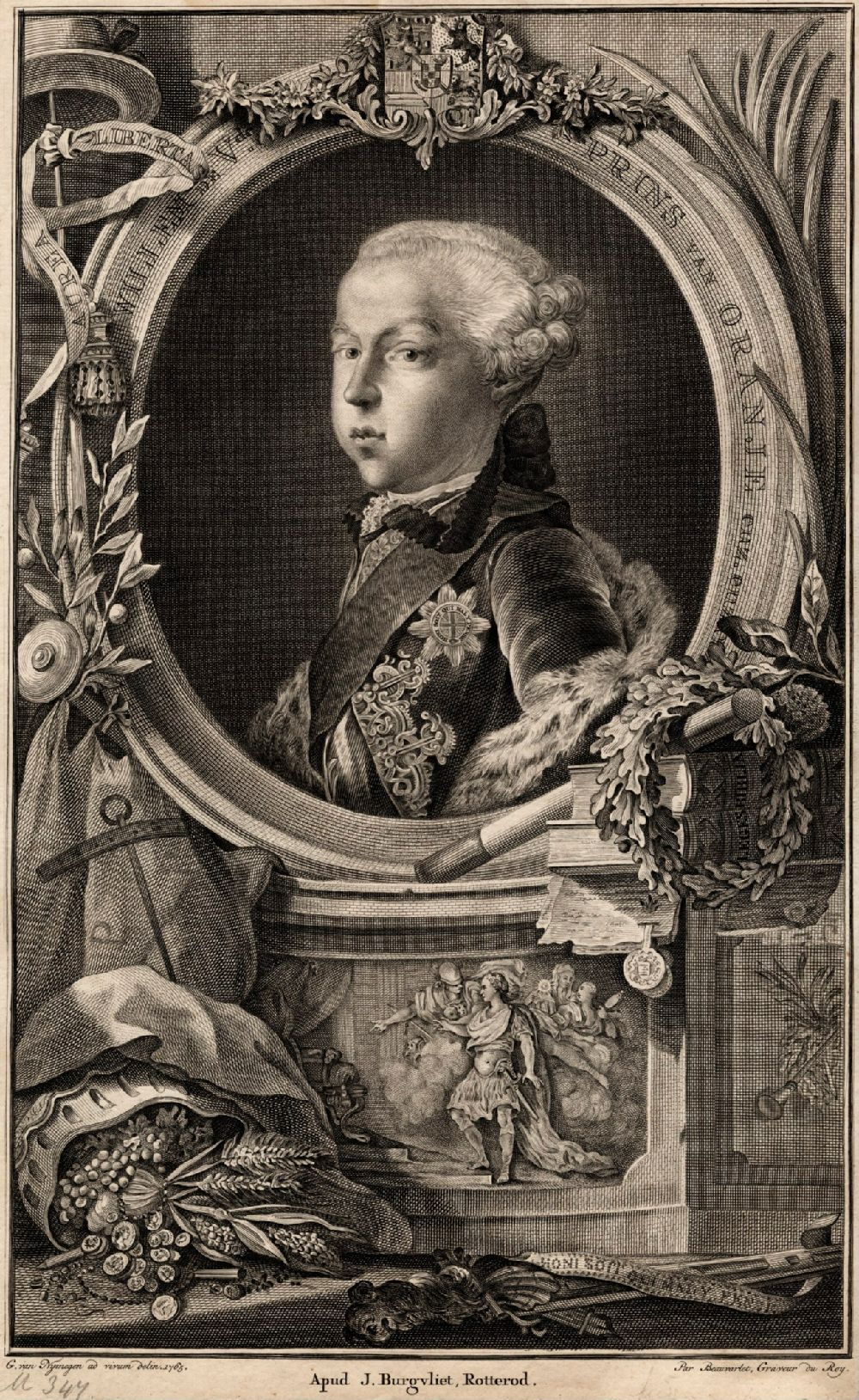
Jacques Firmin Beauvarlet, Portrait of Willem V, Prince of Orange, 1765, engraving

William Batavus was born in The Hague on 8 March 1748, the only son of William IV, who had the year before been restored as stadtholder of the United Provinces. He was only three years old when his father died in 1751, and a long regency began. His regents were:

- Dowager Princess Anne, his mother, from 1751 to her death in 1759;
- Dowager Princess Marie Louise, his grandmother, from 1759 to her death in 1765;
- Duke Louis Ernest of Brunswick-Lüneburg, from 1759 to 1766, and kept on as a privy counsellor, in accordance with the Acte van Consulentschap, until October 1784;
- Princess Carolina, his sister (who at the time was an adult aged 22, while he was still a minor at 17), from 1765 to William's majority in 1766.

William was made the 568th Knight of the Order of the Garter in 1752.

== Stadtholder ==
William V assumed the position of stadtholder and Captain-General of the Dutch States Army on his majority in 1766. However, he allowed the Duke of Brunswick to retain a large influence on the government with the secret Acte van Consulentschap. On 4 October 1767 in Berlin, Prince William married Princess Wilhelmina of Prussia, the daughter of Augustus William of Prussia, niece of Frederick the Great and a cousin of George III. (He himself was George III's first cousin). He became an art collector and in 1774 his Galerij Prins Willem V was opened to the public.

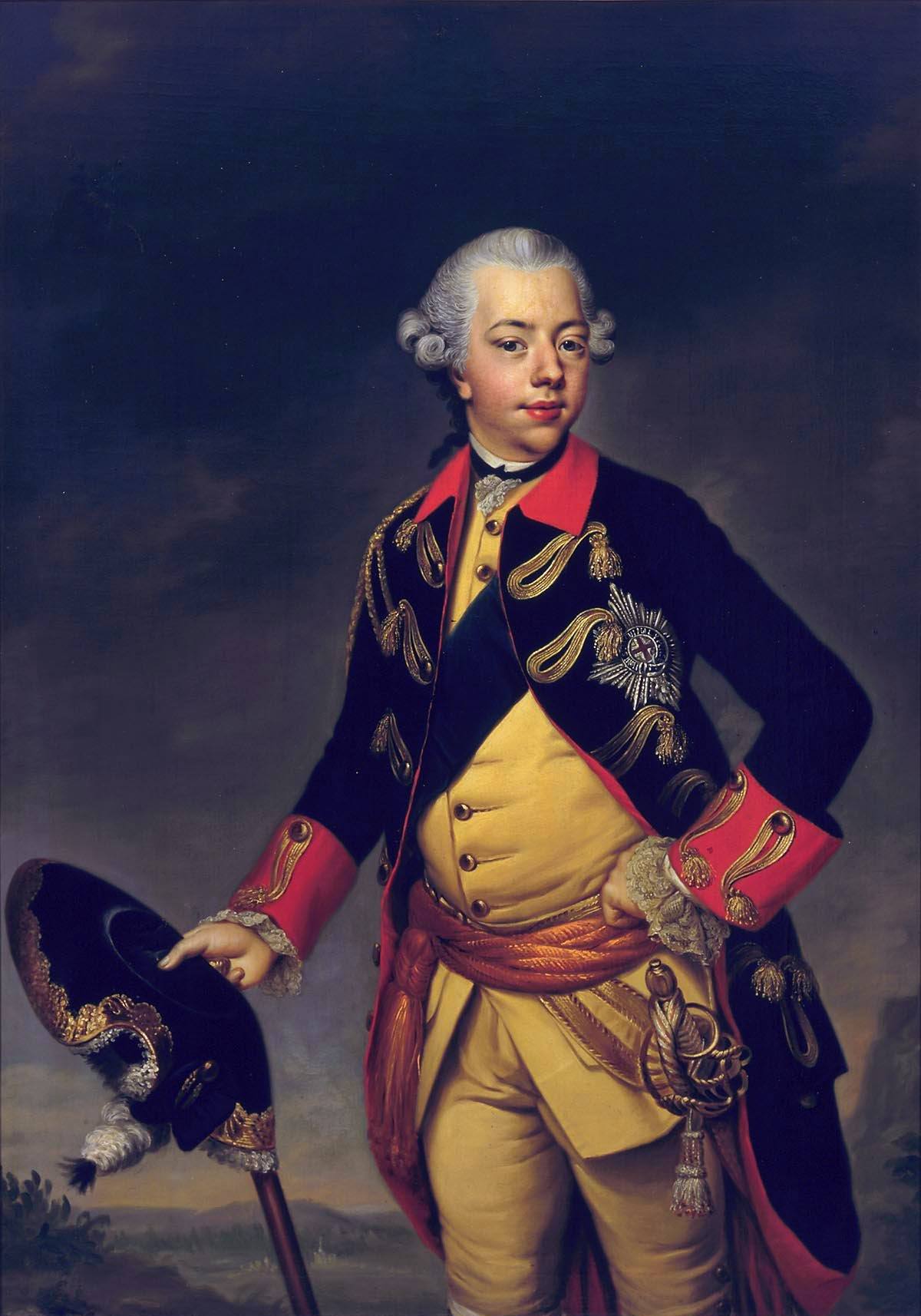
Portrait by Johann Georg Ziesenis (c. 1768–1769)

The position of the Dutch during the American War of Independence was one of neutrality. William V, leading the pro-British faction within the government, blocked attempts by pro-American, and later pro-French, elements to drag the government to war in support of the Franco-American alliance. However, things came to a head with the Dutch attempt to join the Russian-led League of Armed Neutrality, leading to the outbreak of the Fourth Anglo-Dutch War in 1780. In spite of the fact that Britain was engaged in fighting on several fronts, the war went badly for the Dutch, leading to the loss of the undefended Caribbean island of Sint Eustatius, a major supplier of contraband arms to the Americans, as well as Nagapattinam. Scandals like the Brest Affair undermined belief in the Dutch States Navy. The stadtholderian regime and the Duke of Brunswick were suspected of treason in the matter of the loss of the Barrier fortresses. The deterioration of the prestige of the regime made minds ripe for agitation for political reform, like the pamphlet Aan het Volk van Nederland, published in 1781 by Joan van der Capellen tot den Pol.

After the signing of the Treaty of Paris (1783), there was growing restlessness in the United Provinces with William's rule. A coalition of old Dutch States Party regenten and democrats, called Patriots, was challenging his authority more and more. Mid September 1785 William left The Hague and removed his court to Het Loo Palace in Gelderland, a province remote from the political center. In September 1786 he sent States-Army troops to Hattem and Elburg to overthrow the cities' Patriot vroedschap, despite the defense by Patriot Free Corps, organised by Herman Willem Daendels. This provoked the Patriot-dominated States of Holland to deprive him of his office of Captain-General of the Army. (His function was given to Rhinegrave Salm.) In June 1787 his energetic wife Wilhelmina tried to travel to The Hague to foment an Orangist rising in that city. Outside Schoonhoven, she was stopped by the Gouda Free Corps, taken to a farm near Goejanverwellesluis and after a short detention made to return to Nijmegen.

To Wilhelmina and her brother, Frederick William II of Prussia, this was both an insult and an excuse to intervene militarily. Frederick launched the Prussian invasion of Holland in September 1787 to suppress the Patriots. Many Patriots fled to the North of France, around Saint-Omer, in an area where Dutch was spoken. Until his overthrow they were supported by King Louis XVI of France.

== Exile in Great Britain and Ireland ==
William V joined the First Coalition against Republican France in 1793 with the coming of the French Revolution. His troops fought in the Flanders Campaign, but in 1794 the military situation deteriorated and the Dutch Republic was threatened by invading armies. The year 1795 was a disastrous one for the ancien régime of the Netherlands. Supported by the French Army, the revolutionaries returned from Paris to fight in the Netherlands, and in 1795 William V went into exile in England. A few days later the Batavian Revolution occurred, and the Dutch Republic was replaced with the Batavian Republic.

Directly after his arrival in England, the Prince wrote a number of letters (known as the Kew Letters) from his new residence in Kew to the governors of the Dutch colonies, instructing them to hand over their colonies to the British as long as France continued to occupy the "mother country". Only a number complied, while those that demurred from doing so became confused and demoralised. Almost all Dutch colonies were eventually captured by the British, who in the end returned most, but not all (South Africa and Ceylon), first at the Treaty of Amiens and later with the Convention of London signed in 1814.

In 1799 the Hereditary Prince took an active part in the Anglo-Russian invasion of Holland, engineering the capture of a Batavian naval squadron in the Vlieter Incident. The surrender of the ships (that had been paid for by the Batavian Republic) was formally accepted in the name of William V as stadtholder, who was later allowed to sell them to the Royal Navy (for an appreciable amount). But that was his only success, as the troops suffered from choleric diseases, and civilians at that time were unwilling to re-instate the old regime. The arrogance of the tone in his proclamation, demanding the restoration of the stadtholderate, may not have been helpful, according to Simon Schama.

After the Treaty of Amiens in 1802, in which Great Britain recognised the Batavian Republic, an additional Franco-Prussian Convention of 23 May 1802 declared that the House of Orange would be ceded in perpetuity the domains of Dortmund, Weingarten, Fulda and Corvey in lieu of its Dutch estates and revenues (this became the Principality of Nassau-Orange-Fulda). As far as Napoleon was concerned, this cession was conditional on the liquidation of the stadtholderate and other hereditary offices of the Prince. William V, however, had no interest in towns, territories and abbeys confiscated from other rulers, including alternatives as Würzburg and Bamberg, but wanted what was his due: his arrears in salaries and other financial perquisites since 1795, or a lump sum of 4 million guilders. The foreign minister of the Batavian Republic, Maarten van der Goes, was willing to secretly try to persuade the Staatsbewind of the Batavian Republic to grant this additional indemnity, but Napoleon put a stop to it, when he got wind of the affair.

The last of the Dutch stadtholders, William V died in exile at his daughter's palace in Brunswick, now in Germany. His body was moved to the Dutch Royal Family crypt in the Nieuwe Kerk in Delft on 29 April 1958.

In 1813, his son, William VI returned to the Netherlands and proclaimed himself king, thus becoming the first Dutch monarch from the House of Orange.

== Issue ==
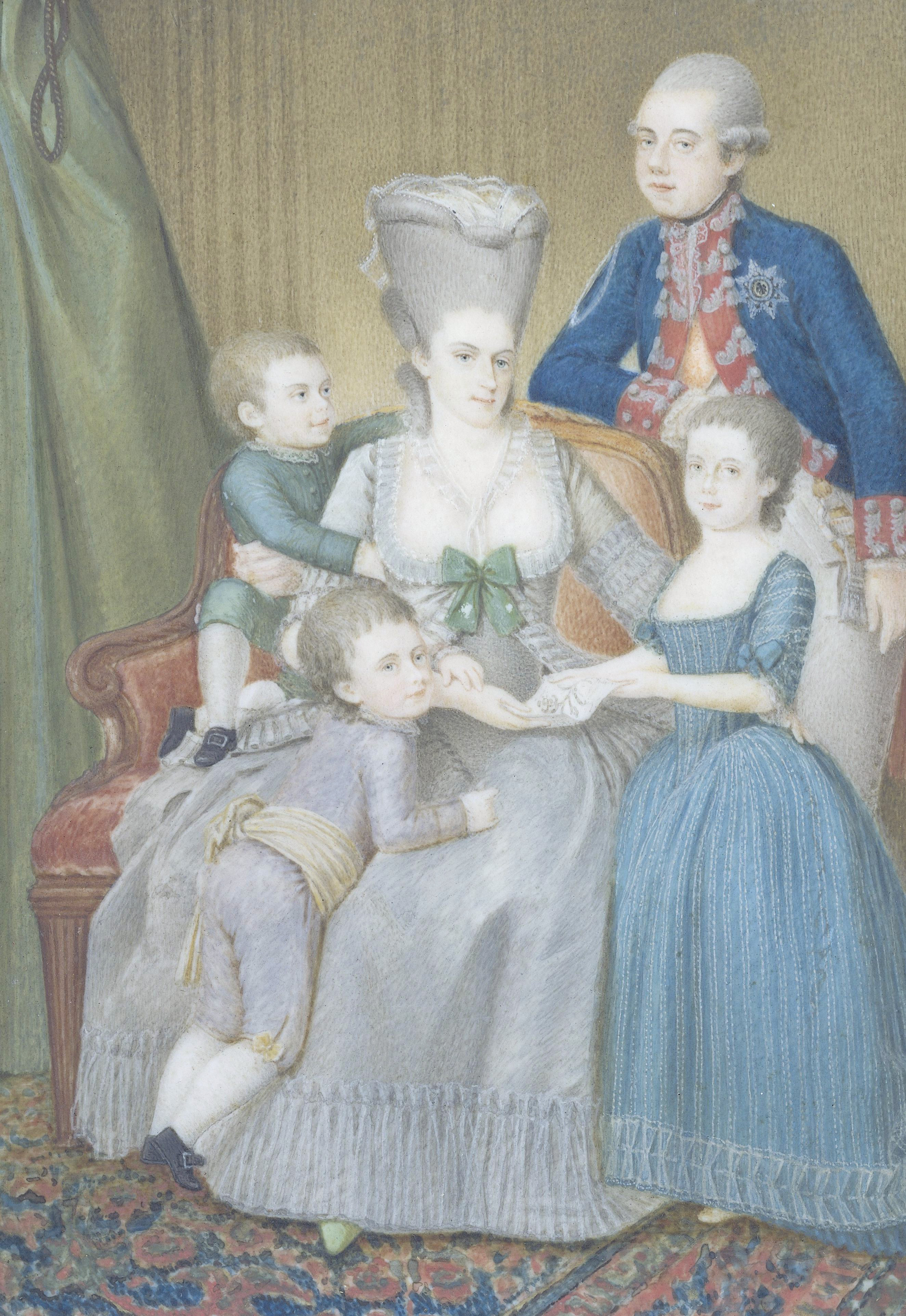
Willem V and Wilhelmina with their children Louise, William, and Frederick.

William V and Wilhelmina of Prussia were the parents of five children:

- An unnamed son (23–24 March 1769).
- Princess Frederika Luise Wilhelmina of Orange-Nassau (The Hague, 28 November 1770 – The Hague, 15 October 1819), married in The Hague on 14 October 1790 Karl, Hereditary Prince of Braunschweig (London, 8 February 1766 – Antoinettenruh, 20 September 1806), son of Karl Wilhelm Ferdinand, Duke of Brunswick-Luneburg and Princess Augusta of Great Britain, without issue.
- An unnamed son (born and deceased on 6 August 1771).
- Willem Frederik, Hereditary Prince of Orange-Nassau (The Hague, 25 August 1772 – 12 December 1843), who became the first King of the Netherlands as William I.
- Prince Willem Georg Frederik, Prince of Orange-Nassau (The Hague, 15 February 1774 – Padua, 6 January 1799), unmarried and without legitimate issue.

== Ancestry ==
Ancestors of William V, Prince of Orange

8. Henry Casimir II, Count of Nassau-Dietz
4. John William Friso, Prince of Orange
9. Henriëtte Amalia van Anhalt-Dessau
2. William IV, Prince of Orange
10. Charles I, Landgrave of Hesse-Kassel
5. Marie Louise of Hesse-Kassel
11. Maria Amalia of Courland
1. William V, Prince of Orange
12. George I of Great Britain
6. George II of Great Britain
13. Sophia Dorothea of Celle
3. Anne, Princess Royal and Princess of Orange
14. John Frederick, Margrave of Brandenburg-Ansbach
7. Caroline of Ansbach
15. Princess Eleonore Erdmuthe of Saxe-Eisenach

== Appreciation ==
During his life and afterward, William V was a controversial person, in himself, and because he was the unwilling center of a political firestorm that others had caused. Many historians and contemporaries have written short appreciations of him that were often acerbic. Phillip Charles, Count of Alvensleben, who was the Prussian envoy to the Hague from 1787 (so not someone who must be suspected to be prejudiced against William) may be taken as an example. He wrote:

His education has all been theory. Duke Louis of Brunswick kept him away from practical affairs and did all the work himself, while the stadtholder merely signed documents. Hence this habit, this compulsion, of talking about public affairs, and turning the functions of stadtholder into the holding of tedious audiences of five, six, seven hours in length, swamping practical problems in useless verbiage, though putting forward wide-ranging proposals, often marked by sound reasoning, sometimes even by genius. Finally, the cardinal defect of settling nothing, of bringing nothing to a point, of replying to nothing, of signing nothing, of concluding nothing; but always of being the stadtholder in theory and never in practice. When he sets to work he does not know how to distinguish the functions of the head of the chancery from those of a mere secretary. In place of taking decisions on a hundred cases, he wastes his time in copying out some memorandum that has been presented to him. Nothing will ever change him, his bent is fixed, and when the Patriots declared that he fulfilled his functions in a ghastly fashion they were quite right.

His great-great-granddaughter Queen Wilhelmina of the Netherlands was less kind. She simply called him a sufferd (dummy).

== Legacy ==
- Orange County, North Carolina was named for William V of Orange
- Orange County, Indiana was named after the North Carolina county.
- The Orange River, the longest river in South Africa was named in honour of William V of Orange.

== See also ==
- House of Orange-Nassau

William V, Prince of Orange House of Orange-Nassau Cadet branch of the House of Nassau Born: 8 March 1748 Died: April 9 1806
Dutch nobility
Preceded by William IV	Prince of Orange; 1751–1806	Succeeded by William VI
Regnal titles
Preceded by William IV of Orange	Prince of Orange-Nassau; 1751–1806	Succeeded by William VI of Orange
Preceded by William IV of Orange	Baron of Breda; 1751–1795	Lordship dissolved incorporated in Batavian Republic
Preceded by William IV of Orange	General Stadtholder of the United Provinces; 1751–1795	Function abolished followed by Batavian Republic
