= Portrait of the Duke of Brunswick =

Painting by Pompeo Batoni

- Artist: Pompeo Batoni
- Year: 1767
- Type: Oil on canvas, portrait painting
- Dimensions: 137 cm × 99 cm (54 in × 39 in)
- Location: Herzog Anton Ulrich Museum; Brunswick

Portrait of the Duke of Brunswick is a 1767 portrait painting by the Italian artist Pompeo Batoni. It depicts the soldier and sovereign prince Charles William Ferdinand, Duke of Brunswick. He is shown during his Grand Tour to Rome, leaning on an Ancient Greek Krater which belonged to Batoni's fellow painter Anton Raphael Mengs.

The Duke had distinguished himself in the Prussian Army during the Seven Years' War. He had closed ties with the British royal family, marrying Princess Augusta of Great Britain, a sister of George III. Brunswick later commanded Allied forces fighting against Revolutionary France, notably at the Battle of Valmy in 1792. He was later fatally wounded at the Battle of Jena–Auerstedt in 1806 during the Napoleonic Wars.

Today the painting is in the collection of the Herzog Anton Ulrich Museum in Brunswick, Germany.

== Bibliography ==
- Bowron, Edgar Peters & Kerber, Peter Björn. Pompeo Batoni: Prince of Painters in Eighteenth-century Rome. Yale University Press, 2007.
- Jenkins, Ian & Sloan, Kim. Vases & Volcanoes: Sir William Hamilton and His Collection. Trustees of the British Museum, 1996.
- Sparkes, Brian A. The Red and the Black: Studies in Greek Pottery. Routledge, 2013.
- Zabecki, David T. Germany at War: 400 Years of Military History. Bloomsbury Publishing USA, 2014.
