= Brunswick Manifesto =

1792 warning to the people of Paris by Charles William Ferdinand, Duke of Brunswick

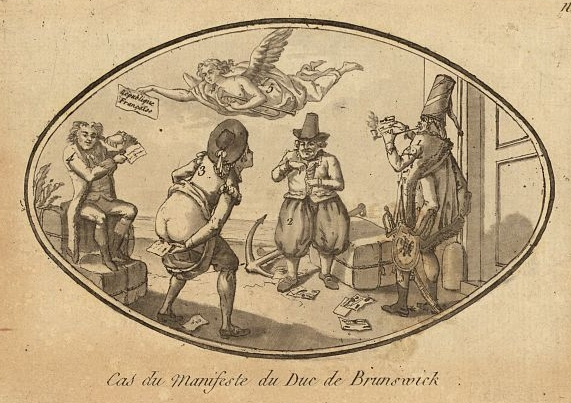
Anonymous caricature depicting the treatment given to the Brunswick Manifesto by the French population

The Brunswick Manifesto was a proclamation issued by Charles William Ferdinand, Duke of Brunswick, commander of the Allied army (principally Austrian and Prussian), on 25 July 1792 to the population of Paris during the War of the First Coalition. The manifesto threatened that if the French royal family were harmed, then French civilians would be harmed. It was said to have been a measure intended to intimidate Paris but rather helped further spur the increasingly radical French Revolution and finally led to the war between Revolutionary France and counter-revolutionary monarchies.

== Background ==
On 20 April 1792, Revolutionary France declared war on Austria. On 28 April, France invaded the Austrian Netherlands (roughly present-day Belgium). Prussia joined the war against France. On 30 July, Austria and Prussia began an invasion of France, hoping to occupy Paris.

== Manifesto ==
On 25 July, the Duke of Brunswick issued his manifesto, which promised that if the French royal family was not harmed, then the Allies would not harm French civilians or loot. However, if acts of violence or acts to humiliate the French royal family were committed, the Allies threatened to burn Paris to the ground. The manifesto was written primarily by Louis Joseph, Prince of Condé, the leader of a large corps of French émigrés in Brunswick's army, and intended to intimidate Paris into submission. Brunswick maintained a secret correspondence with Louis XVI and Marie Antoinette, and two days before making the manifesto public, he sent a copy to the Tuileries Palace, and both the king and the queen approved it.

On 1 August, news of the manifesto began sweeping through Paris. Many believed the Brunswick Manifesto was final proof that Louis XVI was collaborating with the Allies. Also on 1 August, the Prussian Army crossed the Rhine near Koblenz; consequently, the French Legislative Assembly ordered that citizens prepare for battle.

== Impact ==
The prevailing historiographical tradition suggests that the Brunswick Manifesto, rather than intimidate the populace into submission, sent it into furious action and created fear and anger towards the Allies. It also spurred revolutionaries to take further action, organizing an uprising – on 10 August, the Tuileries Palace was stormed in a bloody battle with Swiss Guards protecting it, the survivors of which were massacred by the mob. In late August and early September, the French were defeated in skirmishes with the Allied army, but on 20 September, the French triumphed in the Battle of Valmy. Following its defeat, the Prussian army withdrew from France.

Recent research, however, argues that the Brunswick Manifesto did not have nearly the impact upon the revolutionaries suggested in earlier source material. Firstly, the opinion of what amounted to an external foe among the French radical left was altogether trivial, both before and after the issuance of the manifesto; their attention remained firmly focused on the internal threat: the French monarchy. Secondly, the literary and artistic record from the summer of 1792 suggests that Brunswick created not fear nor anger but rather humor; French cartoonists in particular took to satirizing Brunswick and his manifesto with great vigor. Lastly, the French refused to take the Brunswick Manifesto seriously in any respect, believing it to be inauthentic. This determination stemmed from what they believed to be its illegality, disrespect for the law of war, and denial of national sovereignty.

== See also ==
- La patrie en danger
- Declaration of Pillnitz
