= Charles William Ferdinand, Duke of Brunswick =

Duke of Brunswick from 1780 to 1806

Charles William Ferdinand
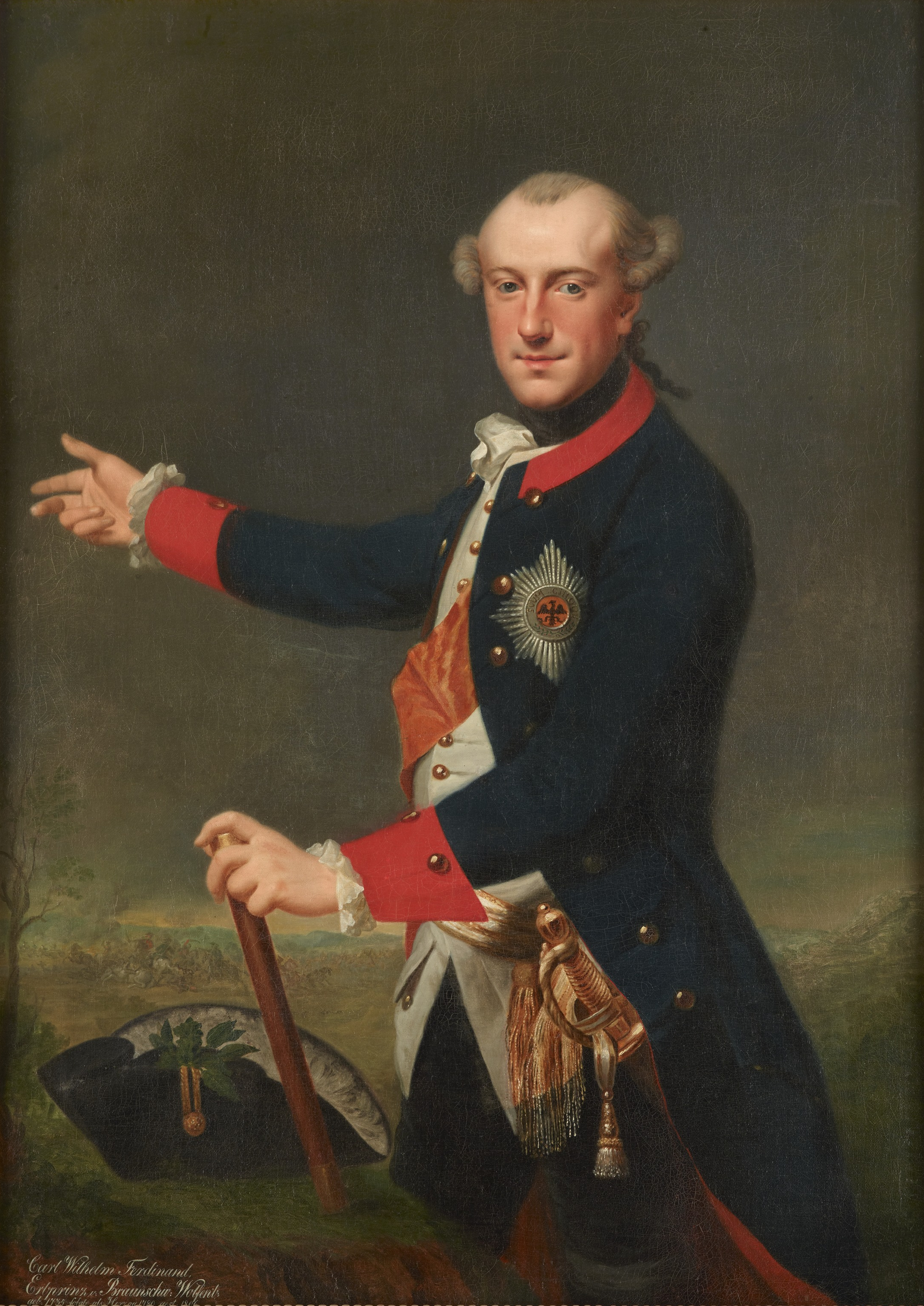
- Portrait by Johann Georg Ziesenis

Prince of Brunswick-Wolfenbüttel
- Reign: 26 March 1780 – 10 November 1806
- Predecessor: Charles I
- Successor: Frederick William
- Born: 9 October 1735; Wolfenbüttel, Brunswick-Wolfenbüttel, Holy Roman Empire
- Died: 10 November 1806 (aged 71); Ottensen, Hamburg
- Burial: 24 November 1806; Christianskirche, Ottensen, Hamburg; 6 November 1819; Brunswick Cathedral
- Spouse: Princess Augusta of Great Britain (m. 1764)
- Issue Details: Augusta, Duchess Frederick of Württemberg; Karl Georg August, Hereditary Prince of Brunswick-Wolfenbüttel; Caroline, Queen of the United Kingdom; Prince George William Christian; Prince Augustus; Frederick William, Duke of Brunswick-Wolfenbüttel; Princess Amelia
- House: Brunswick-Bevern
- Father: Charles I, Duke of Brunswick-Wolfenbüttel
- Mother: Princess Philippine Charlotte of Prussia
- Military career
- Allegiance: Prussia
- Branch: Prussian Army
- Rank: Generalfeldmarschall
- Conflicts: Great French War; • Battle of Valmy; • Siege of Mainz; • Battle of Pirmasens; • Battle of Kaiserslautern; • Battle of Auerstedt (DOW)

Charles William Ferdinand (German: Karl Wilhelm Ferdinand; 9 October 1735 – 10 November 1806) was the ruling prince of Brunswick-Wolfenbüttel, hereditary duke of Brunswick-Lüneburg and a military leader. His titles are usually shortened to Duke of Brunswick in English-language sources.

He succeeded his father as sovereign prince of the Principality of Brunswick-Wolfenbüttel, one of the princely states of the Holy Roman Empire. The duke was a cultured and benevolent despot in the model of his uncle, Frederick the Great, and was married to Princess Augusta, the eldest sister of George III of Great Britain. He was also a recognized master of 18th-century warfare, serving as a field marshal in the Prussian Army. He played a notable role in the French Revolutionary Wars by issuing the Brunswick Manifesto. During the Napoleonic Wars, he was mortally wounded by a musket ball at the Battle of Jena–Auerstedt in 1806.

== Early life ==
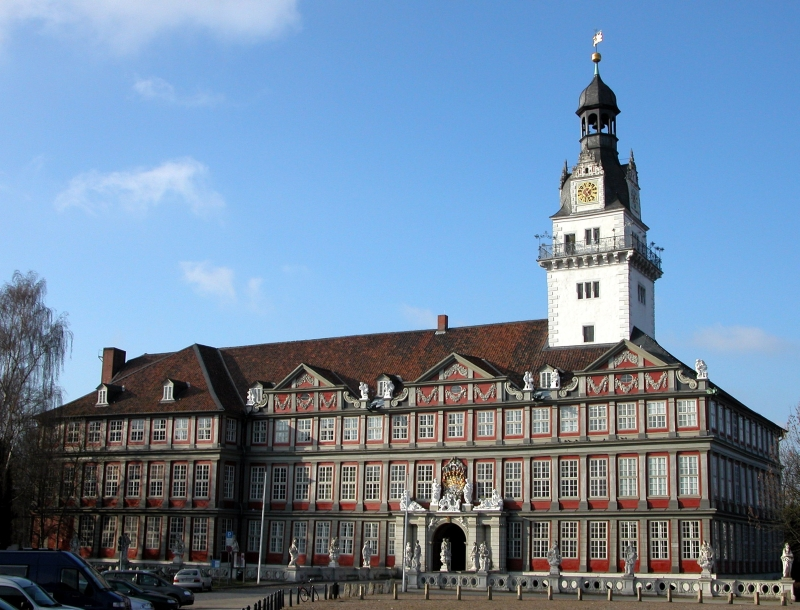
Schloss Wolfenbüttel, probable birthplace of Charles William Ferdinand

Charles William Ferdinand was born in the town of Wolfenbüttel on 9 October 1735, probably in Wolfenbüttel Castle. He was the firstborn son of Charles I, Duke of Brunswick-Wolfenbüttel and his wife Philippine Charlotte.

His father Charles I was the ruling prince (German: Fürst) of the small state of Brunswick-Wolfenbüttel, one of the imperial states of the Holy Roman Empire. Philippine Charlotte was the favourite daughter of King Frederick William I of Prussia and sister of Frederick II of Prussia (Frederick the Great). As the heir apparent of a sovereign prince, Charles William Ferdinand received the title of Hereditary Prince (German: Erbprinz).

He received an unusually wide and thorough education, overseen by his mother. In his youth he travelled in the Netherlands, France and various parts of Germany. In 1753, his father moved the capital of the principality back to Brunswick (German: Braunschweig), the state's largest city. (Wolfenbüttel had been the capital since 1432.) The royal family moved into the newly built Brunswick Palace.

== Early military career ==
Charles William Ferdinand entered the military, serving during the Seven Years' War of 1756–63. He joined the allied north-German forces of the Hanoverian Army of Observation, whose task was to protect Hanover (in personal union with the Kingdom of Great Britain) and the surrounding states from invasion by the French. The force was initially commanded by the Anglo-Hanoverian Prince William, Duke of Cumberland. At the Battle of Hastenbeck (1757) Charles William Ferdinand led a charge at the head of an infantry brigade, an action which gained him some renown.

The subsequent French Invasion of Hanover and the Convention of Klosterzeven of 1757 temporarily knocked Hanover out of the war (they were to return the following year). Cumberland was recalled to Britain and the remaining allied north-German forces were placed under the command of Ferdinand of Brunswick, brother of Charles I, who easily persuaded his nephew Charles William Ferdinand to renew his military service as a general officer.

Charles William Ferdinand was part of the allied Anglo-German force at the Battle of Minden (1759), and the Battle of Warburg (1760). Both were decisive victories over the French, during which he proved himself an excellent subordinate commander. He continued to serve in the army commanded by his uncle for the remainder of the war, which was generally successful for the north German forces. The hereditary prince's reputation improved throughout, and he became an acknowledged master of irregular warfare. Peace was restored in 1763.

== Marriage and travels ==
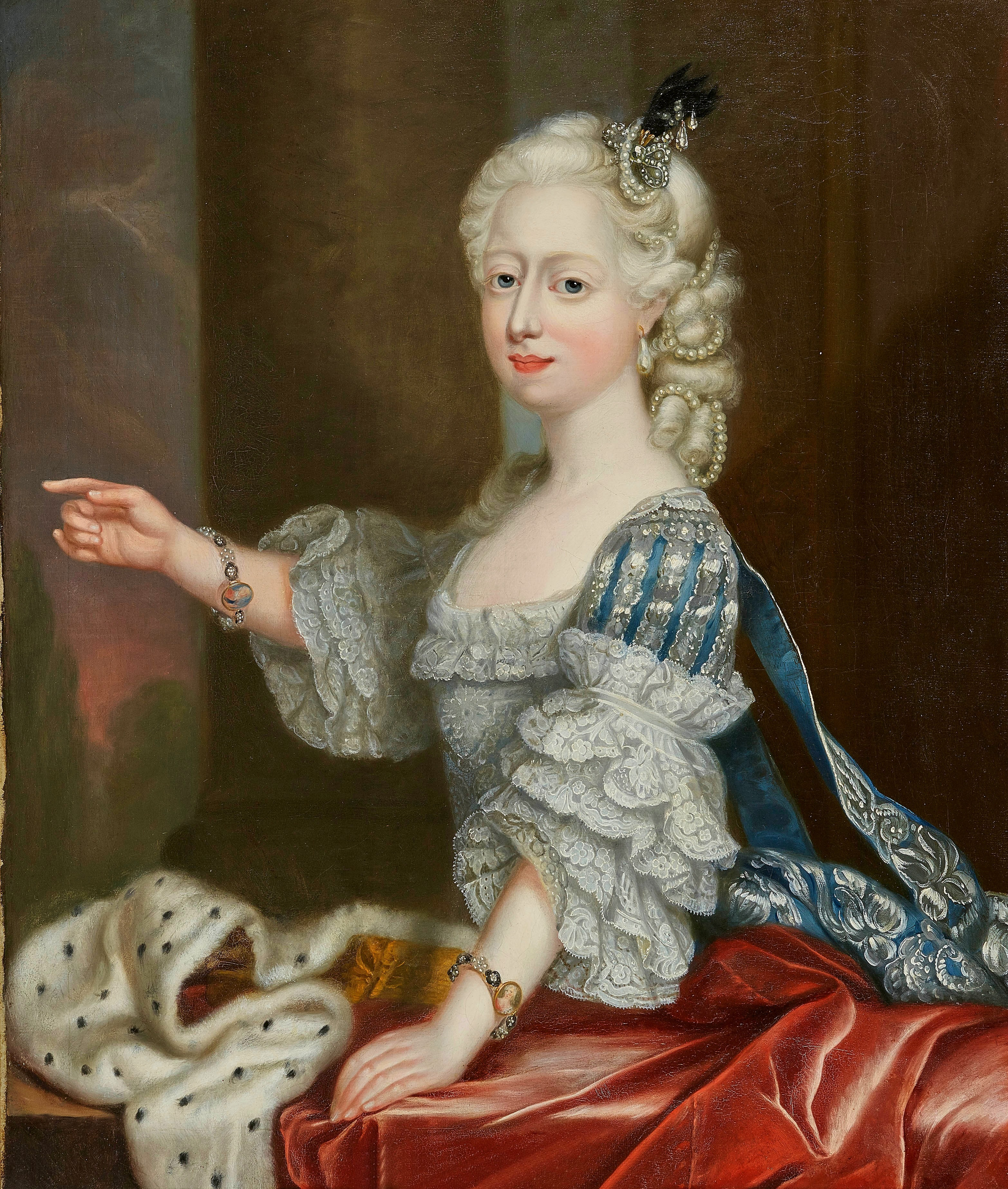
Princess Augusta of Great Britain, his wife, painted c. 1763

The royal houses of the former Duchy of Brunswick-Lüneburg had traditionally married within the family, to avoid further division of their family lands under Salic law. By the time, Brunswick-Lüneburg had consolidated back into two states, Brunswick-Wolfenbüttel and the Electorate of Brunswick-Lüneburg (Hanover). The electorate was ruled by the Hanoverian branch of the family in personal union with the Kingdom of Great Britain. It was therefore arranged for Charles William Ferdinand to marry a British-Hanoverian princess: Princess Augusta of Great Britain, daughter of Frederick, Prince of Wales and his wife, Princess Augusta of Saxe-Gotha, and sister of the reigning King George III.

In 1764, shortly after the Seven Years' War had ended, he travelled to London (landing at Harwich) to marry Princess Augusta. He received a rapturous welcome from the British people, thanks to his service with allied British troops during the war. The Parliament of Great Britain showed its gratitude by voting him a lump sum of £80,000 and an annual income of £3,000 as a wedding gift. (Note: Equivalent in 2025 to £12,600,000 and £470,000 per year respectively.) However George III was less welcoming, and sought to express his displeasure through numerous small insults e.g. by lodging the prince at Somerset House, instead of one of the royal palaces; not providing him with a military guard; and instructing the servants at the wedding to wear old clothes. This merely served to exacerbate the enthusiasm of the public, particularly when the prince was suspected of turning his back on the unpopular monarch while attending an opera (a breach of social protocol). Charles William Ferdinand defied royal displeasure by meeting William Pitt the Elder (who had been prime minister during the war but resigned in 1761) and the other leaders of the parliamentary opposition. The wedding was completed, but as a result of these machinations, the prince remained in Britain for only thirteen days.

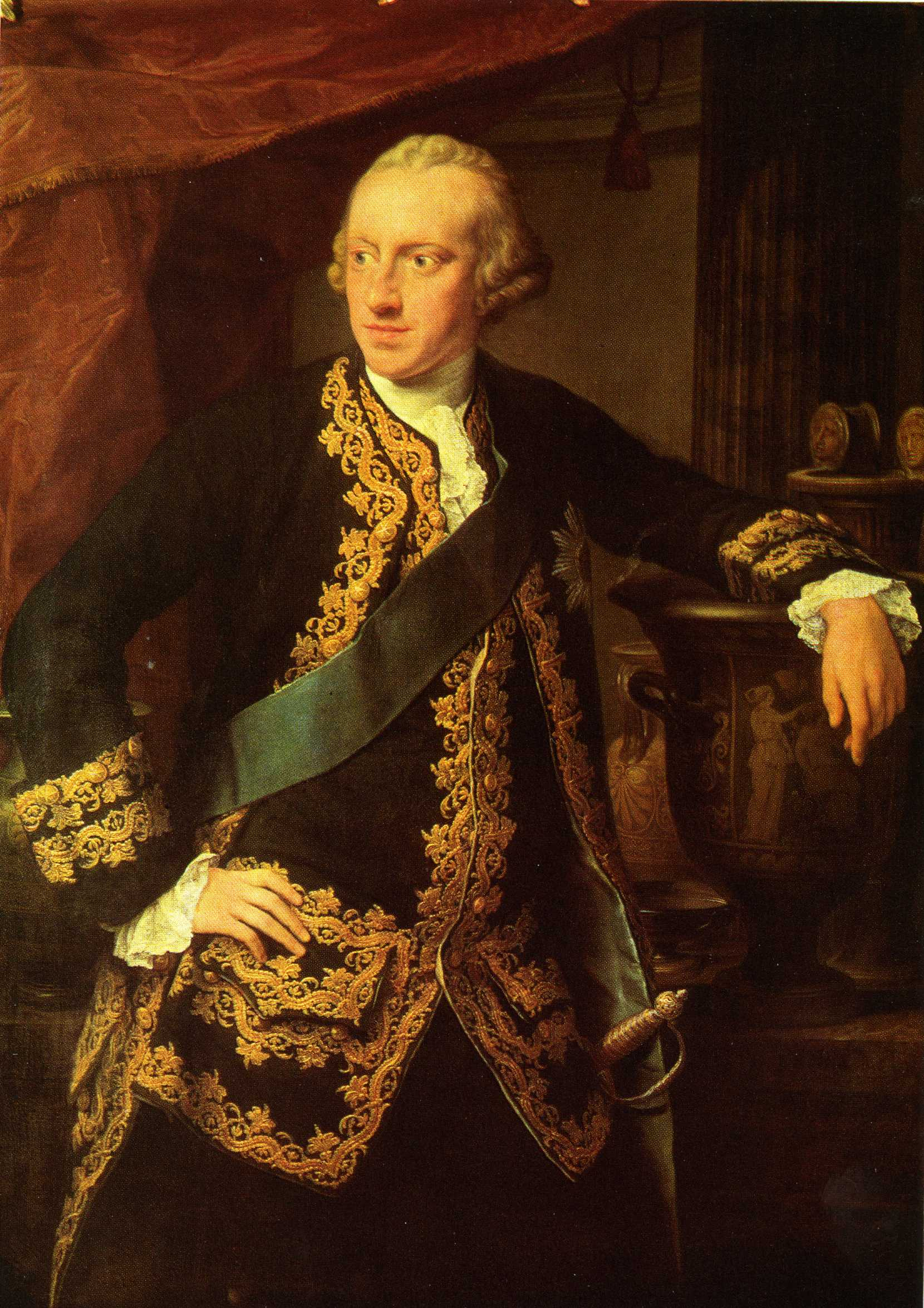
Portrait of the Duke of Brunswick by Pompeo Batoni, 1767.

Over the next few years the couple embarked on a wide-ranging tour of Europe, visiting many of the major states. In 1766 they went to France, where they were received by both his allies and recent battlefield enemies with respect. In Paris he made the acquaintance of Marmontel. The couple next proceeded to Switzerland, where they met Voltaire. The longest stop on their travels was Rome, where they remained for a long time, exploring the antiquities of the city under the guidance of Johann Winckelmann. During their travels the couple also met Pietro Nardini and in 1767 the prince had his portrait painted by Pompeo Batoni. After a visit to Naples they returned to Paris, and thence to Brunswick.

== Ruler of Brunswick-Wolfenbüttel ==
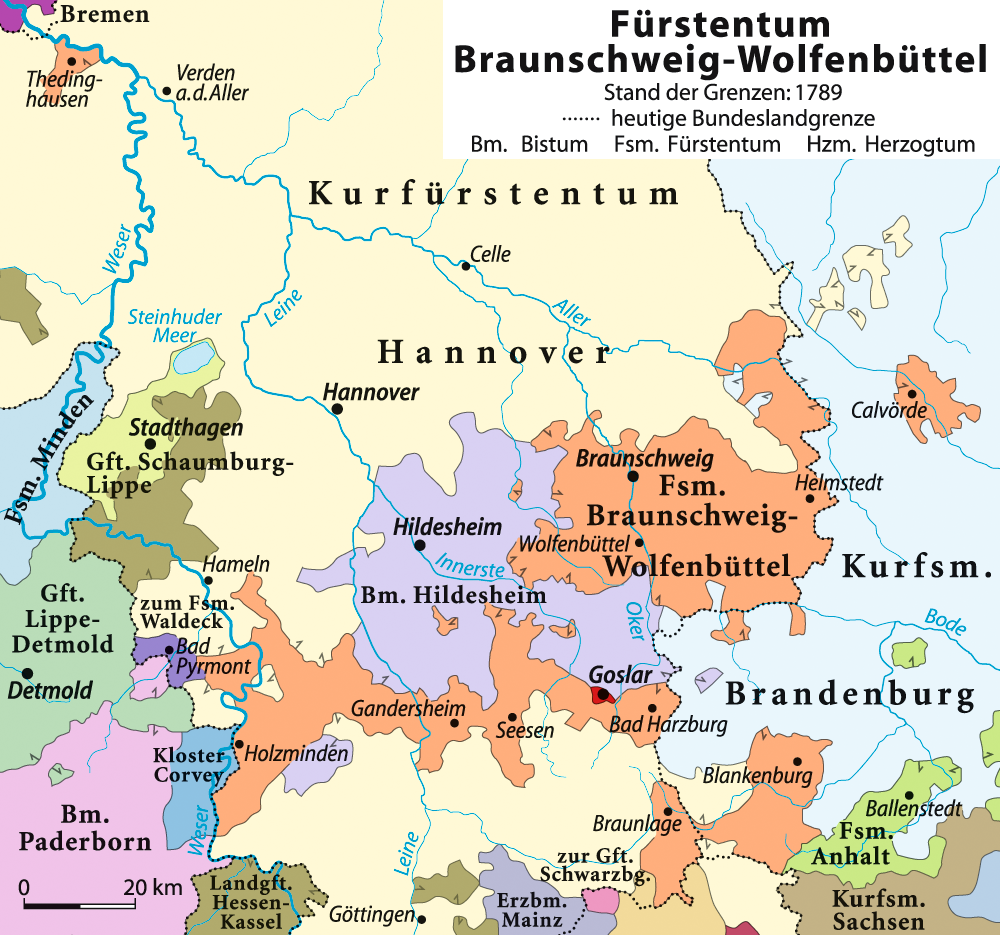
Territory of the Principality of Brunswick-Wolfenbüttel (orange-red) in 1789. The principality was composed of several non-contiguous parts, including the exclaves of Thedinghausen and Calvörde. Its largest neighbours were the Electorate of Hanover (in personal union with Great Britain, light yellow), the Electorate of Brandenburg (part of Prussia, light blue) and the Bishopric of Hildesheim (violet).

=== Restoration of state finances ===
His father, Charles I, had been an enthusiastic supporter of the war, but nearly bankrupted the state in paying for it. As a result, in 1773 Charles William Ferdinand was given a major role in reforming the economy with the assistance of the Geheimrat, Féronce von Rotenkreuz. They were highly successful, restoring the state's finances and improving the economy. This made the prince hugely popular in the duchy.

When the American Revolutionary War broke out in 1775, Charles William Ferdinand saw an opportunity to replenish the state's treasury by renting its well-trained army to Great Britain. In 1776, Charles I signed a treaty supporting Britain in the war, the first prince to do so. Under the terms of this treaty, Brunswick-Wolfenbüttel supplied 4,000 troops for service with the British armies in America, under the command of general Friedrich Adolf Riedesel. Riedesel was given command of all the German troops serving in the Saratoga campaign, under British general John Burgoyne. Burgoyne was defeated in the Battles of Saratoga (1777), and his troops were taken captive as the Convention Army. Although the terms of surrender allowed the Convention Army to give their parole and return to Europe, the American Continental Congress revoked the convention. The Convention Army was kept in captivity until the war ended in 1783.

=== Reign ===
Charles I died in 1780, at which point Charles William Ferdinand inherited the throne. He soon became known as a model sovereign, a typical enlightened despot of the period, characterised by economy and prudence.

The duke's combination of interest in the well-being of his subjects and habitual caution led to a policy of gradual reforms, a successful middle way between the conservatism of some contemporary monarchs and the over-enthusiastic wholesale changes pursued by others. He sponsored enlightenment arts and sciences; most notably he was patron to the young mathematician Carl Friedrich Gauss, paying for him to attend university against the wishes of Gauss's father.

He resembled his uncle Frederick the Great in many ways, but he lacked the resolution of the king, and in civil as in military affairs was prone to excessive caution. He brought Brunswick into close alliance with the king of Prussia, for whom he had fought in the Seven Years' War; he was a Prussian field marshal, and was at pains to make the regiment of which he was colonel a model one.

The duke was frequently engaged in diplomatic and other state affairs. In August 1784 he hosted a secret diplomatic visit from Karl August, Duke of Saxe-Weimar and Saxe-Eisenach (Goethe was a member of Karl August's entourage). The visit was disguised as a family visit, but was in fact to discuss the formation of a league of small- and mid-sized German states as a counterbalance within the Holy Roman Empire to Habsburg monarchy's ambitions to trade the Austrian Netherlands for the Electorate of Bavaria. This Fürstenbund (League of Princes) was formally announced in 1785, with the Duke of Brunswick as one of its members and commander of its military forces. The league was successful in forcing the Austrian Joseph II to back down, and thereafter became obsolete.

The Swedish princess and diarist Hedwig Elizabeth Charlotte visited Brunswick in 1799; she described the Duke as "witty, literal and a pleasant acquaintance but ceremonial beyond description. He is said to be quite strict, but a good father of the nation who attends to the needs of his people."

In 1803 the process of German Mediatisation led to the acquisition of the neighbouring imperial abbeys of Gandersheim and Helmstedt, which were secularised.

== Military commander ==
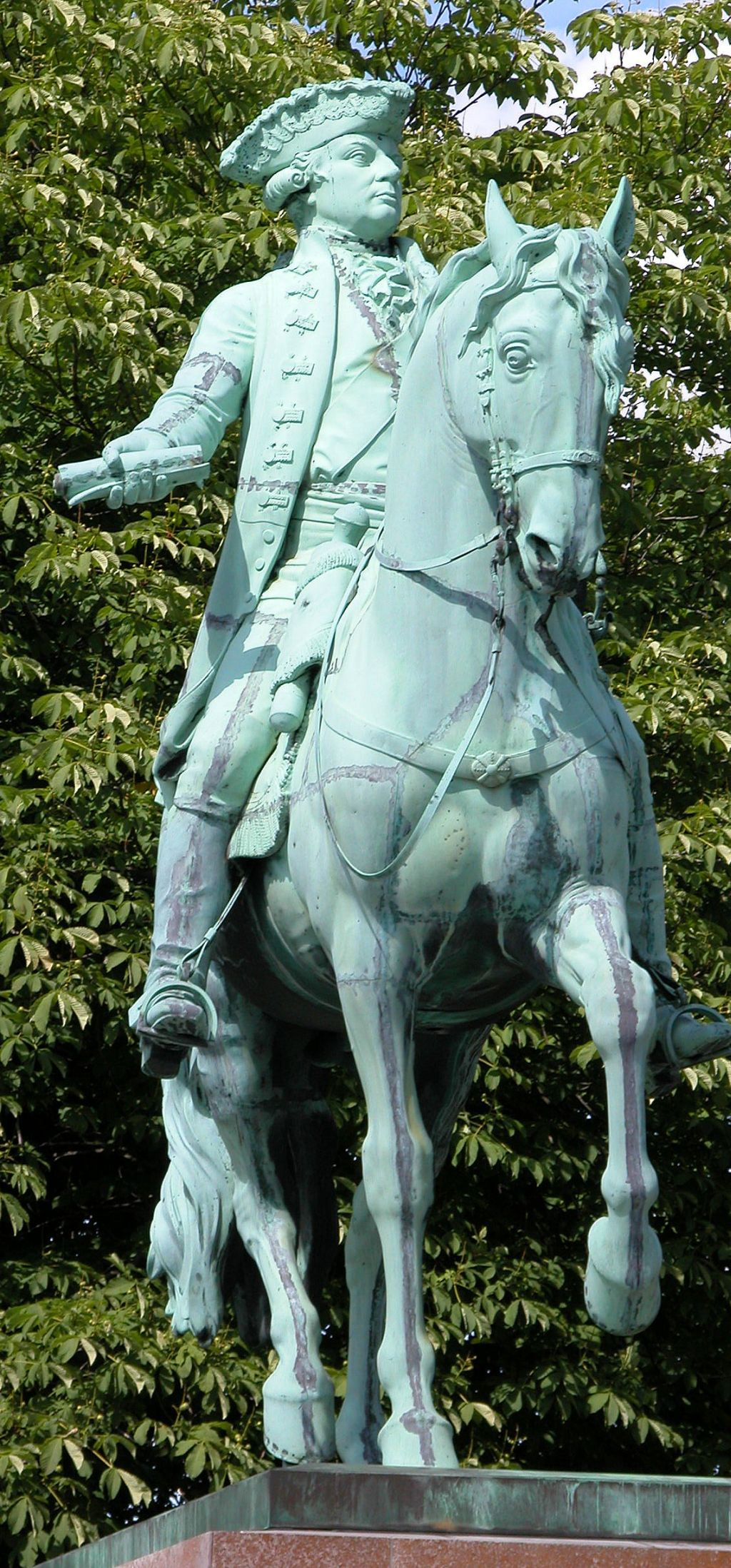
Equestrian statue of the duke in Brunswick, by Franz Pönninger.

He was made a Prussian general in 1773.

=== War of the Bavarian Succession ===
From 1778 to 1779 he served in the War of the Bavarian Succession. Frederick II praised the prince personally for his conduct during the war.

=== Invasion of the Netherlands ===
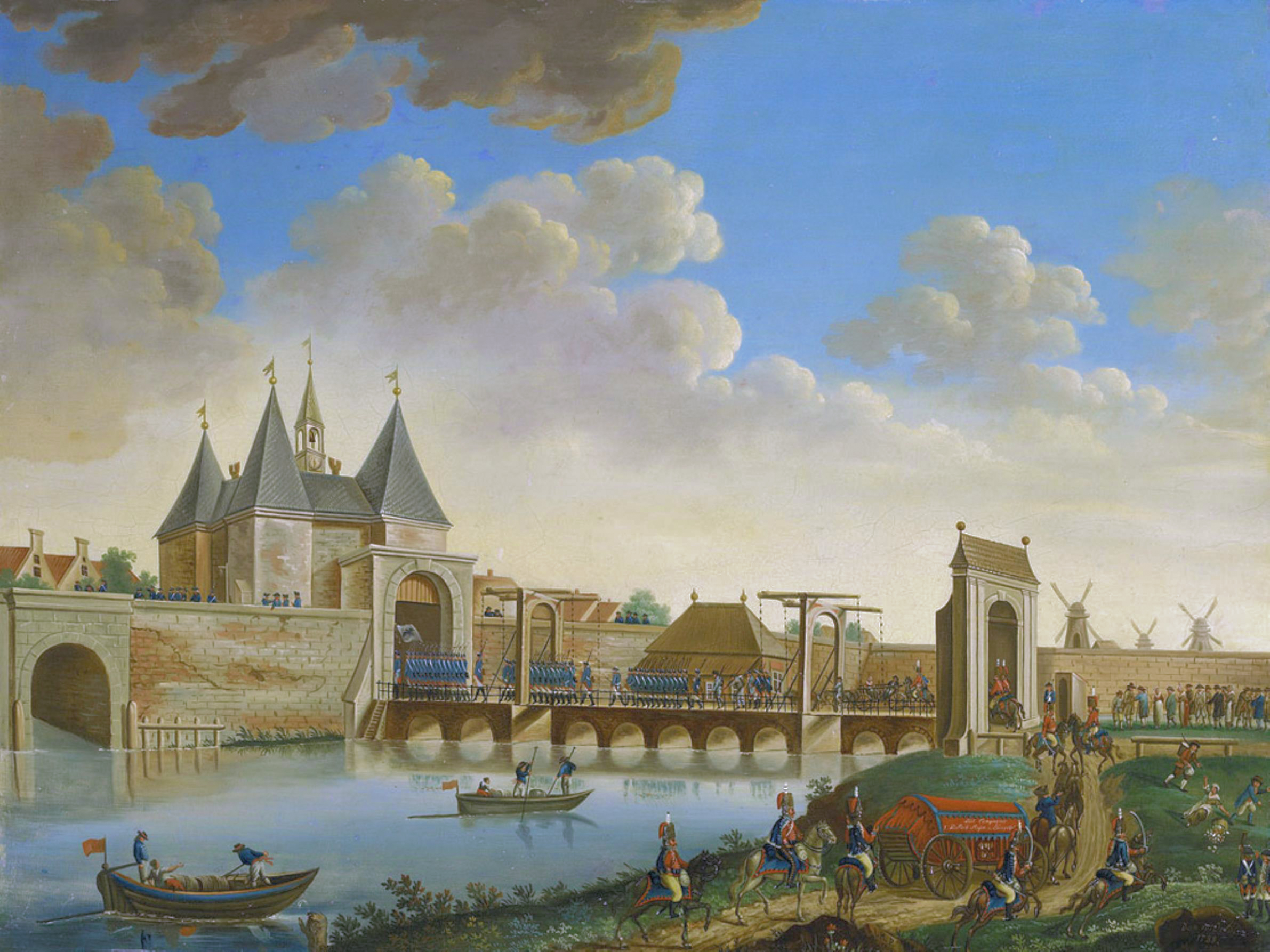
Prussian troops entering Amsterdam on 10 October 1787

In 1787 the Duke was made Generalfeldmarschall (field marshal) in the Prussian army. Frederick William II of Prussia appointed him as commander of a 20,000-strong Prussian force which was to invade the United Provinces of the Netherlands (The Dutch Republic). The goal was to suppress the Patriots of the Batavian Revolution, restoring the authority of the stadtholder William V of the House of Orange. Much of the country was in open revolt against William, whose personal troops were unable to quell the Patriot militias and the various Dutch provinces refused to aid him.

The Encyclopædia Britannica described the Duke's invasion: "His success was rapid, complete and almost bloodless, and in the eyes of contemporaries the campaign appeared as an example of perfect generalship". The Patriots were out-manoeuvred and overwhelmed: their militias were unable to put up any real resistance, were forced to abandon their insurrection, and many Patriots fled to France.

The Duke's forces entered the Netherlands on 13 September and occupied Nijmegen that day. The largest Patriot force, 7,000 men under the Rhinegrave of Salm, was quickly out-manoeuvred and forced to abandon Utrecht, which the Duke occupied on 16 September. The Prussian force captured Gorcum on the 17th after a short artillery bombardment, followed by Dordrecht on the 18th and Delft on the 19th. They entered The Hague on the 20th, from which the Patriots had been forced to withdraw following a loyalist insurrection on the 17th. Amsterdam, the last city occupied by the Patriots, surrendered on 10 October. The campaign had taken less than a month. William V was restored to power, which he was to hold until 1795.

Both contemporaries and historians have praised the Duke's decisive campaign, in which he manoeuvred to concentrate his forces and achieve overwhelming local superiority, before moving on to the next city. He also received credit for the low number of casualties; one British observer suggested that "the sap of the trees was the only blood shed" (an exaggeration), referring to the wooden palisades and batteries constructed by both sides.

=== War of the First Coalition ===
At the outbreak of the War of the First Coalition in the early summer of 1792, Ferdinand was poised with military forces at Coblenz. After the Girondins had arranged for France to declare war on Austria, voted on 20 April 1792, the Catholic Holy Roman Emperor Leopold II and the Protestant King of Prussia Frederick William II had combined armies and put them under Brunswick's command.

==== The Brunswick Proclamation ====
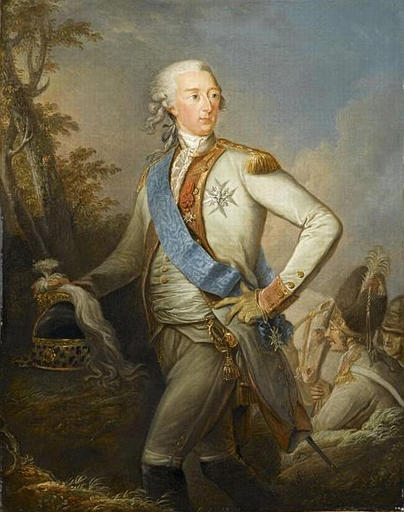
Louis Joseph, Prince of Condé, primary author of the Brunswick Manifesto

The "Brunswick Proclamation" or "Brunswick Manifesto" that he now issued from Coblenz on 25 July 1792, threatened war and ruin to soldiers and civilians alike, should the Republicans injure Louis XVI and his family. His avowed aim was:

to put an end to the anarchy in the interior of France, to check the attacks upon the throne and the altar, to reestablish the legal power, to restore to the king the security and the liberty of which he is now deprived and to place him in a position to exercise once more the legitimate authority which belongs to him.

Additionally, the manifesto threatened the French population with instant punishment should they resist the Imperial and Prussian armies, or the reinstatement of the monarchy. In large part, the manifesto had been written by Louis XVI's cousin, Louis Joseph de Bourbon, Prince de Condé, who was the leader of a large corps of émigrés in the allied army.

It has been asserted that the manifesto was in fact issued against the advice of Brunswick himself; the duke, a model sovereign in his own principality, sympathised with the constitutional side of the French Revolution, while as a soldier he had no confidence in the success of the enterprise. However, having let the manifesto bear his signature, he had to bear the full responsibility for its consequences. The proclamation was intended to threaten the French population into submission; it had exactly the opposite effect.

In Paris, Louis XVI was generally believed to be in correspondence with the Austrians and Prussians already, and the republicans became more vocal in the early summer of 1792. Rather than assuring the continued existence of the French monarchy, Brunswick's proclamation would instead ensure its downfall; the manifesto was rapidly distributed in Paris on 28 July, apparently by monarchists, who badly misjudged the effect it would have. The Brunswick Manifesto seemed to furnish the agitators with a complete justification for the revolt that they were already planning. When news spread of a combined Austrian and Prussian army led by Brunswick marching into French soil on the days after the Manifesto was publicised, the Paris populace, already incensed by the threat against the city, exploded into violence. The first violent action was carried out on 10 August, when the Tuileries Palace was stormed.

==== Invasion of France ====
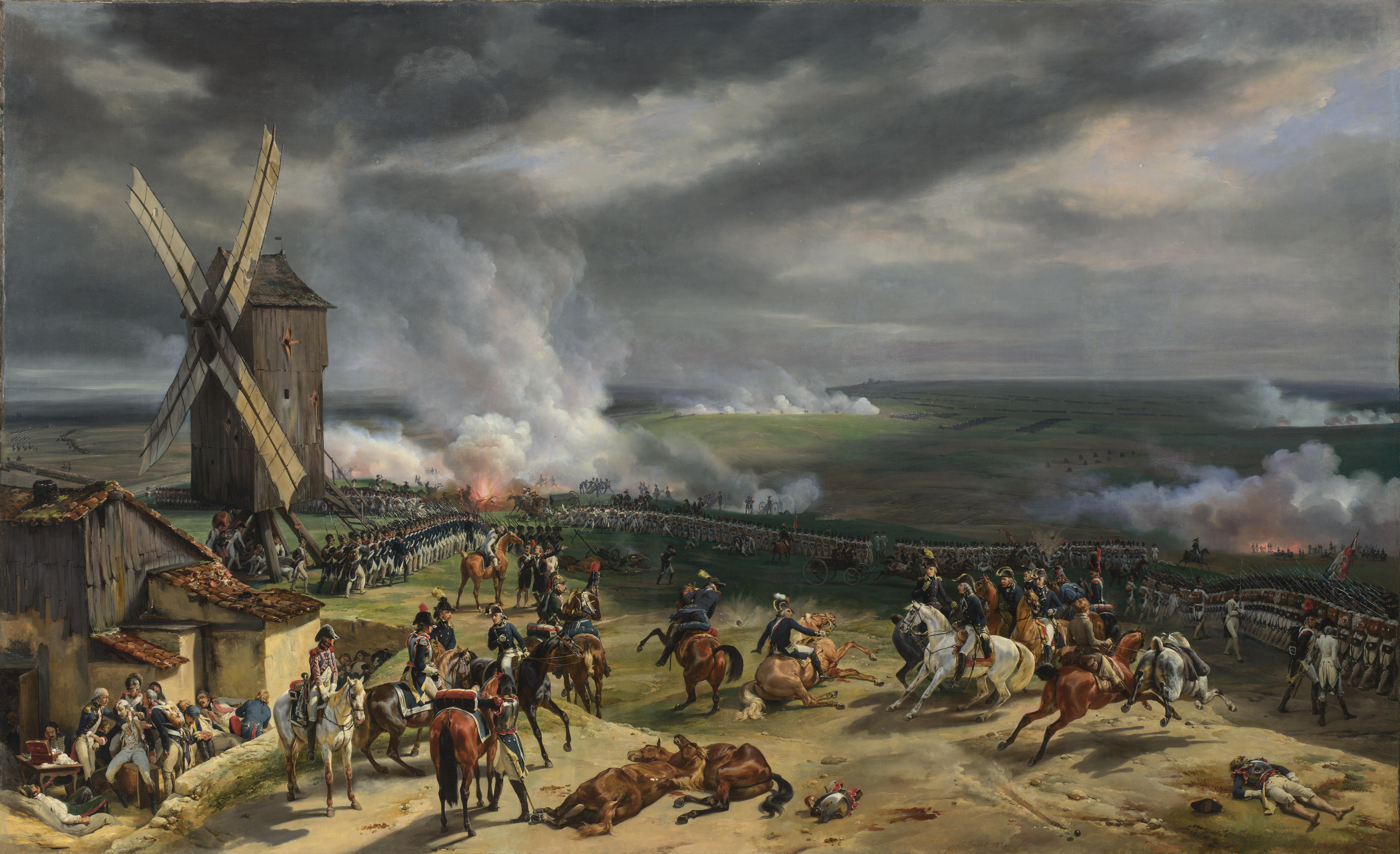
The Battle of Valmy, painted by Horace Vernet.

The Duke was disappointed that the British remained neutral. His initial advance into France was slowed by poor weather, the rough terrain of the Forest of Argonne, and an outbreak of dysentery among his troops.

The Duke was less successful against the French citizens' army that met him at Valmy. Having secured Longwy and Verdun without serious resistance, he turned back after a mere skirmish in Valmy, and evacuated France.

Initially the Duke intended to winter in the fortress of Verdun, before resuming the campaign in France the following spring. However, Kellerman's forces outflanked him by advancing up the Rhine, recapturing French possessions there. The Duke abandoned Verdun on 8 October and Longwy on 22 October, before retreating back into Germany.

When he counterattacked the Revolutionary French who had invaded Germany, in 1793, he recaptured Mainz after a long siege, but resigned in 1794 in protest at interference by Frederick William II of Prussia.

=== War of the Fourth Coalition ===
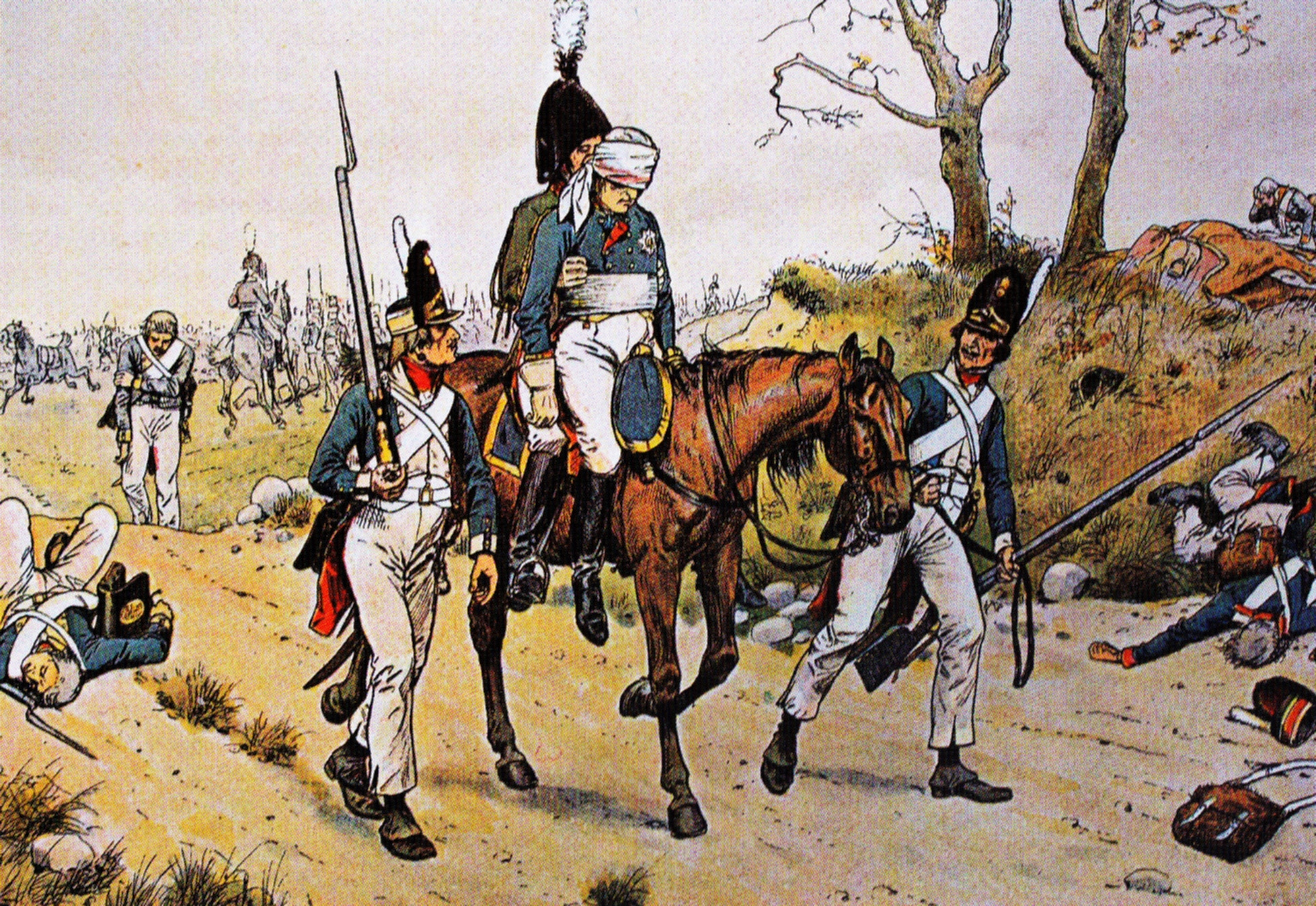
The wounded Duke of Brunswick after the Battle of Jena-Auerstedt.

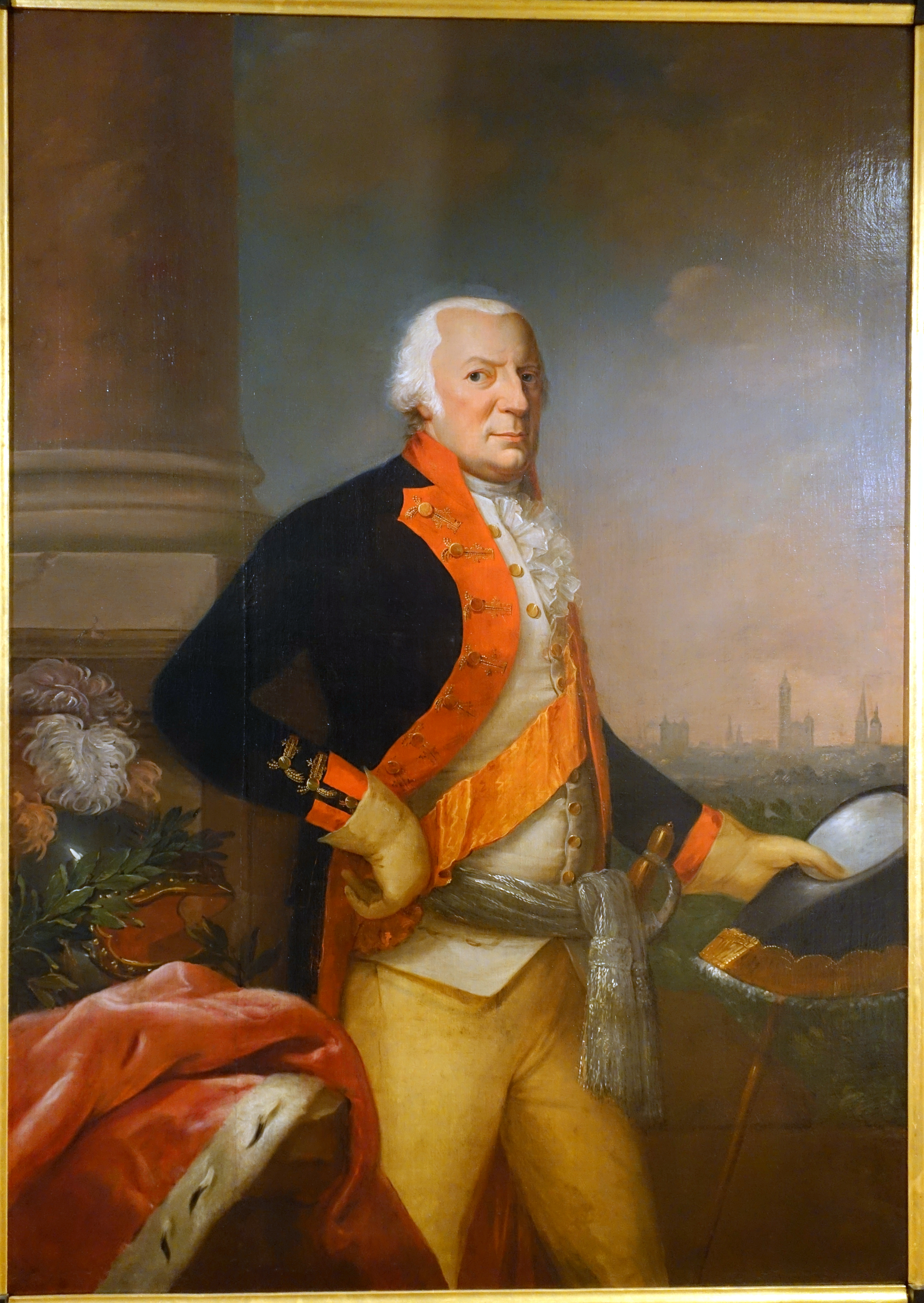
Brunswick in the 1790s.

Prussia did not take part in the Second Coalition or the Third Coalition against Revolutionary France. However, in 1806 Prussia declared war on France, beginning the War of the Fourth Coalition. Despite being over 70 years old, the Duke of Brunswick returned to command the Prussian army at the personal request of Louise, Queen of Prussia.

By this stage the Prussian army was regarded as backward, using outdated tactics and with poor communication. The structure of the high command has been particularly criticised by historians, with multiple officers developing differing plans and then disagreeing on which should be followed, leading to disorganisation and indecision.

The duke commanded the large Prussian army at Auerstedt during the double Battle of Jena–Auerstedt on 14 October 1806. His forces were defeated by Napoleon's marshal Davout, despite the Prussians outnumbering the French around Auerstedt by two to one. During the battle he was struck by a musket ball and lost both of his eyes; his second-in-command Friedrich Wilhelm Carl von Schmettau was also mortally wounded, causing a breakdown in the Prussian command. Severely wounded, the Duke was carried with his forces before the advancing French. He died of his wounds in Ottensen on 10 November 1806.

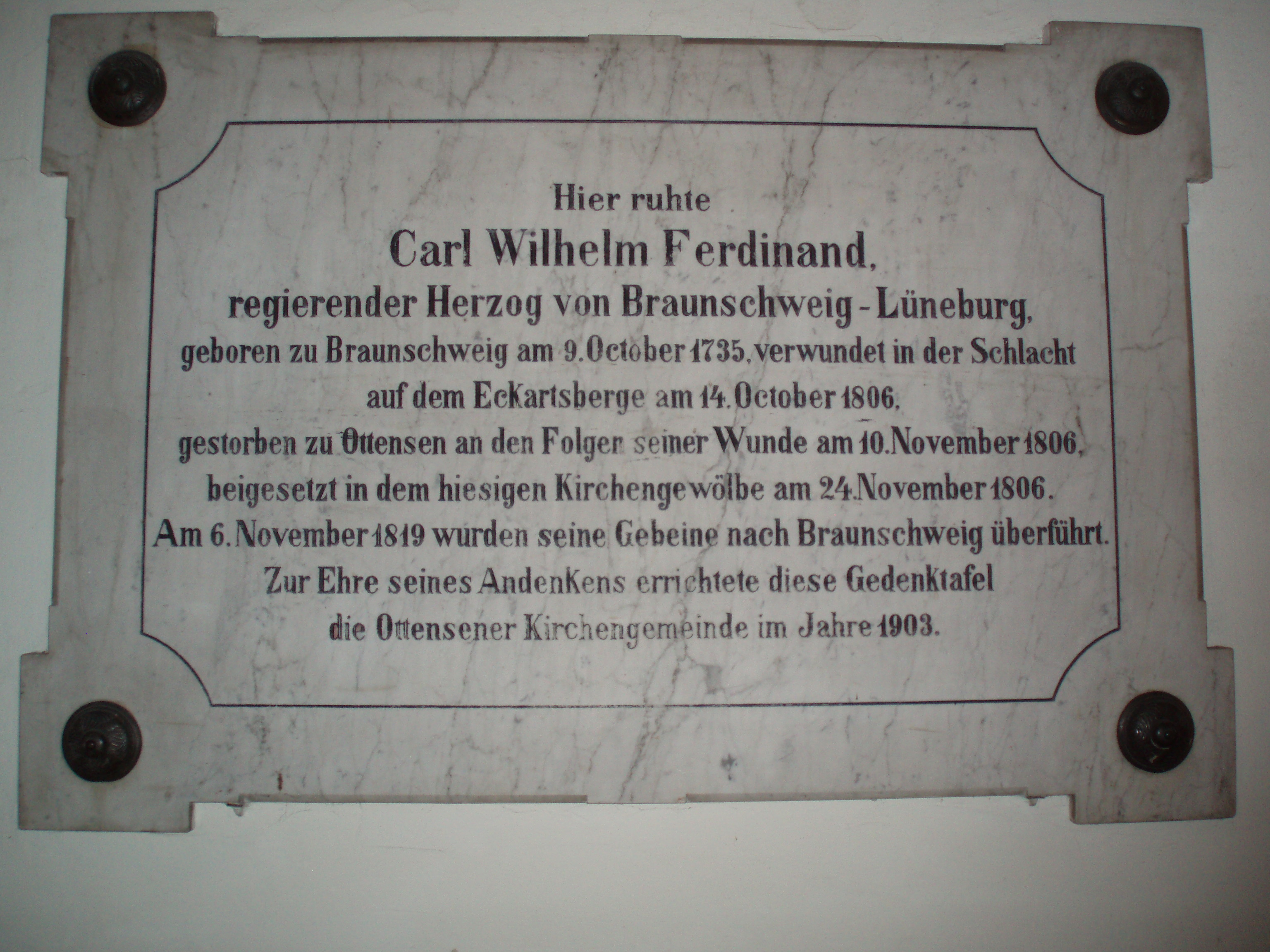
Memorial in Christianskirche

The duke's body was provisionally laid to rest in the Christianskirche at Ottensen in 1806. It was later transferred for reburial in Brunswick Cathedral on 6 November 1819.

== Family ==
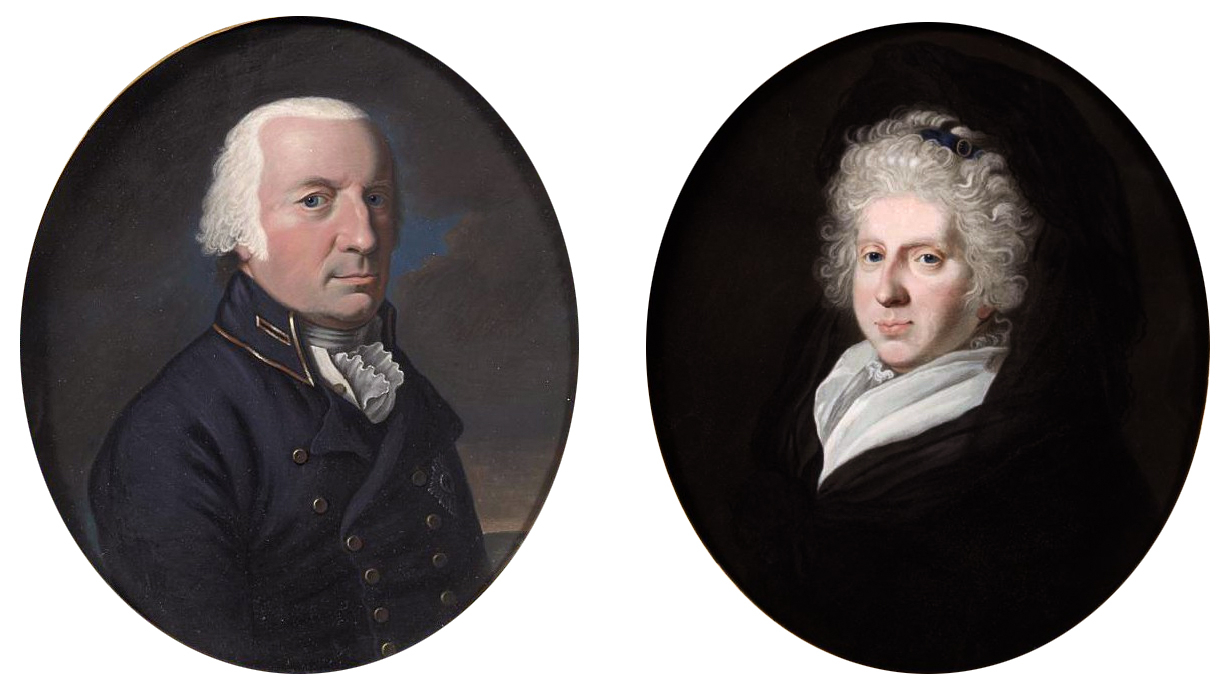
Karl Wilhelm Ferdinand II, Herzog von Braunschweig-Wolfenbüttel (1735–1806) and Princess Augusta of Great Britain

On 16 January 1764, Charles married Princess Augusta of Great Britain, eldest sister of King George III. The couple were second cousins to each other, being great-grandchildren of George I of Great Britain. As such, they were not related in a particularly close degree, yet there had been many bonds of marriage between the House of Brunswick-Bevern and the House of Hanover, themselves both branches of the House of Welf.

Some commentators have pointed to inbreeding as a possible cause for the fact that many of the couple's children had physical, mental or psychological disabilities. Indeed, the duke was once moved to describe his children to von Massenbach as "mostly cripples in mind and body."

Shortly after they married, the prince had the Schloss Richmond built for his wife. It was in English architectural style and with an English landscape garden, to remind her of her home.

The duke and his wife Augusta had four sons and three daughters. Three of their four sons had major debilities. Their eldest son, Karl Georg August (1766–1806) was named heir apparent, but had a significant learning disability and was regarded as "well-nigh imbecile."

Nevertheless, he was married in 1790 to Frederika of Orange-Nassau, daughter of William V, Prince of Orange, a gentle, good-hearted woman who remained devoted to him to the end. He died childless at the age of 40 in 1806, shortly before his father. The second son, Georg Wilhelm Christian (1769–1811), had an even more severe learning disability than his elder brother. He was declared incapacitated and excluded from the succession. He never married. The couple's third son was August (1770–1822). He was blind and also excluded from the succession. He, too, never married. The fourth son, Friedrich Wilhelm (1771 – 16 June 1815), was sound of mind and body. He eventually succeeded his father, married and sired two sons.

Frederick and Augusta also had three daughters, two of whom reached adulthood. Neither of them was disabled, but both of them had similar, disastrous trajectories in life. Both of them were married to future kings, both made extreme failures of their marriages, both had extremely acrimonious relations with their husbands, and both were accused by them of similar faults: adultery, uncouth behaviour, absence of dignity, falsehood and utter fecklessness. The elder daughter, Auguste Caroline Friederike (1764–1788), was the wife of the future king Frederick I of Württemberg and mother of the future William I of Württemberg. She separated from her husband and died in Russia from complications that arose while giving birth in secret to an illegitimate child.

The younger daughter, Caroline of Brunswick, was married in 1795 to her first cousin, the future George IV of the United Kingdom, and bore him a daughter, the ill-fated Princess Charlotte of Wales. On two occasions (1806 and 1818–19), her husband made serious efforts to divorce her on grounds of adultery, forming commissions of inquiry to indict her, and after he became king, he in fact caused the House of Lords to pass a bill of divorce citing adultery with an Italian commoner.

However, the bill was never introduced in the House of Commons and the divorce was never finalised. Caroline died three weeks after she was physically prevented from entering Westminster Abbey to participate in her husband's coronation.

The future Queen of Sweden, Hedwig Elizabeth Charlotte of Holstein-Gottorp, described the ducal family thus:

The Duchess is the sister to the King of England and a typical Englishwoman. She looked very simple, like a vicar's wife, has I am sure many admirable qualities, and is very respectable, but completely lacks manners. She makes the strangest questions without considering how difficult and unpleasant they can be. ... The sons of the Ducal couple are somewhat peculiar. The (eldest) prince, chubby and fat, almost blind, strange and odd - if not to say an imbecile - attempts to imitate his father but only makes himself artificial and unpleasant. He talks continually, does not know what he says, and is in all aspects unbearable. He is accommodating but a poor thing, loves his consort to the point of worship, and is completely governed by her. The (second) son, Prince Georg, is the most ridiculous person imaginable, and so silly that he can never be left alone but is always accompanied by a courtier. The third son is also described as an original. I never saw him, as he served with his regiment. The fourth is the only normal one, but also torments his parents by his immoral behaviour.

The duke also fathered at least one illegitimate child, a son named Forstenburg, who began a promising military career but was killed in action in 1793.

=== Issue ===
| Name | Birth | Death | Notes |
|---|---|---|---|
| Auguste Caroline Friederike Luise | 3 December 1764 | 27 September 1788 | married 1780, Friedrich III, Duke of Württemberg; had issue |
| Karl Georg August | 8 February 1766 | 20 September 1806 | married 1790, Frederika Luise Wilhelmine, Princess of Orange-Nassau; no issue |
| Caroline Amalie Elisabeth | 17 May 1768 | 7 August 1821 | married 1795, George IV of the United Kingdom; had issue |
| Georg Wilhelm Christian | 27 June 1769 | 16 September 1811 | Declared an invalid; Excluded from line of succession |
| August | 18 August 1770 | 18 December 1822 | Declared an invalid; Excluded from line of succession |
| Friedrich Wilhelm | 9 October 1771 | 16 June 1815 | married 1802, Maria Elisabeth Wilhelmine, Princess of Baden; had issue |
| Amelie Karoline Dorothea Luise | 22 November 1772 | 2 April 1773 | died in infancy. |

=== Ancestry ===
Ancestors of Charles William Ferdinand, Duke of Brunswick

8. Ferdinand Albert I, Duke of Brunswick-Wolfenbüttel-Bevern
4. Ferdinand Albert II, Duke of Brunswick-Lüneburg
9. Princess Christine of Hesse-Eschwege
2. Charles I, Duke of Brunswick-Wolfenbüttel
10. Louis Rudolph, Duke of Brunswick-Wolfenbüttel
5. Duchess Antoinette of Brunswick-Wolfenbüttel
11. Princess Christine Louise of Oettingen-Oettingen
1. Charles William Ferdinand, Duke of Brunswick
12. Frederick I of Prussia
6. Frederick William I of Prussia
13. Princess Sophia Charlotte of Hanover
3. Princess Philippine Charlotte of Prussia
14. George I of Great Britain
7. Princess Sophia Dorothea of Hanover
15. Princess Sophia Dorothea of Celle

Charles William Ferdinand, Duke of Brunswick House of Brunswick-Bevern Cadet branch of the House of Welf Born: 9 October 1735 Died: 10 November 1806
Regnal titles
| Preceded by Charles I | Duke of Brunswick-Lüneburg; Prince of Brunswick-Wolfenbüttel; 1780–1806 | Succeeded by Frederick William |
