= Princess Augusta of Great Britain =

Duchess of Brunswick from 1780 to 1806

Princess Augusta
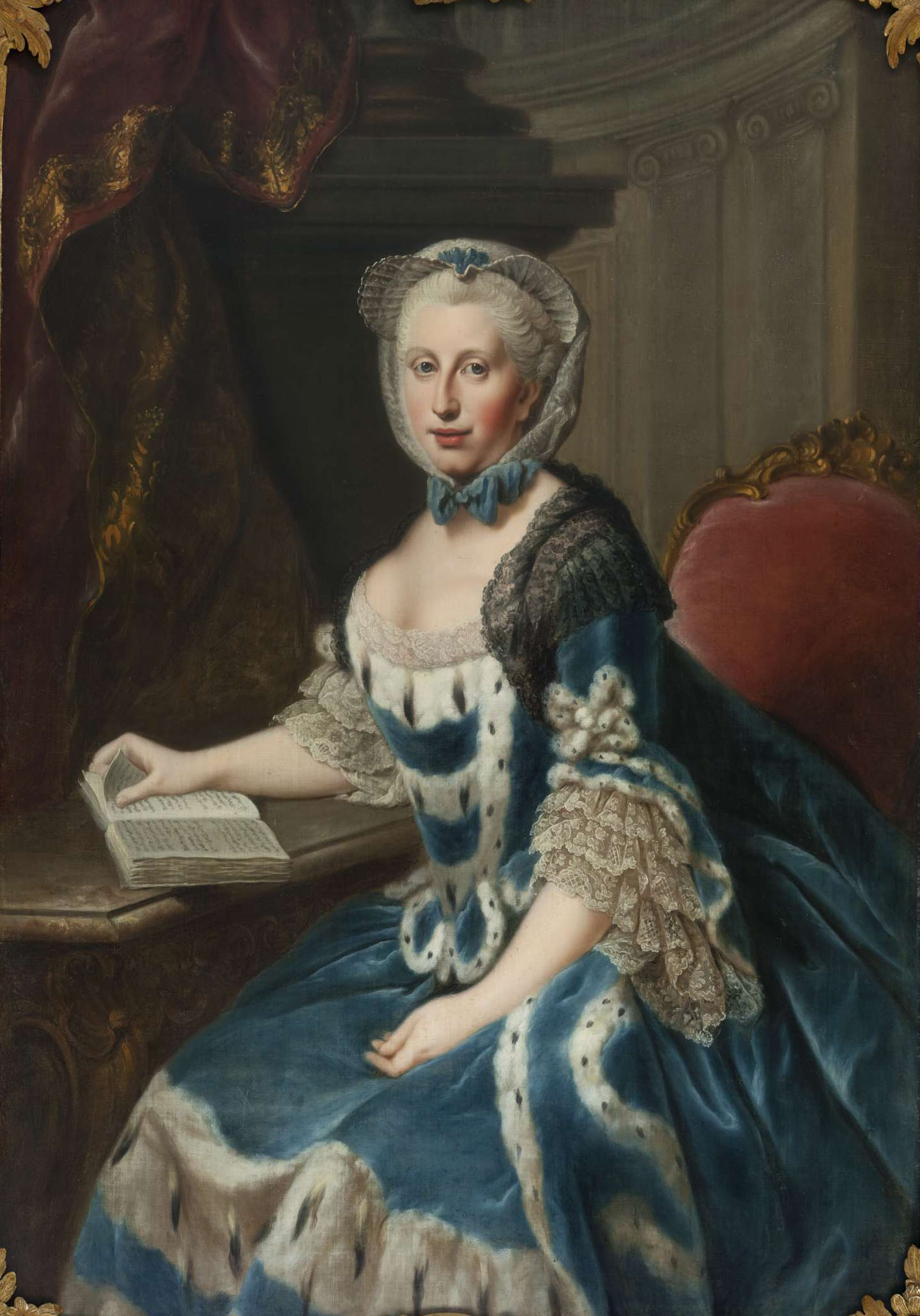
- c. 1764–1770 portrait

Duchess consort of Brunswick-Lüneburg Princess consort of Brunswick-Wolfenbüttel
- Tenure: 26 March 1780 – 10 November 1806
- Born: 31 July 1737; St James's Palace, London
- Died: 23 March 1813 (aged 75); Hanover Square, London
- Burial: 31 March 1813; Royal Vault, St George's Chapel, Windsor Castle
- Spouse: Charles William Ferdinand, Duke of Brunswick (m. 1764; died 1806)
- Issue Details: Augusta, Duchess Frederick of Württemberg; Karl Georg August, Hereditary Prince of Brunswick-Wolfenbüttel; Caroline of Brunswick; Prince George William Christian; Prince Augustus; Frederick William, Duke of Brunswick-Wolfenbüttel; Princess Amelia
Names
- Augusta Frederica
- House: Hanover
- Father: Frederick, Prince of Wales
- Mother: Augusta of Saxe-Gotha-Altenburg

Augusta of Great Britain (Augusta Frederica; 31 July 1737 – 23 March 1813) was a British princess, granddaughter of George II and the only elder sibling of George III. She was Duchess of Brunswick-Lüneburg and Princess of Brunswick-Wolfenbüttel by marriage to Charles William Ferdinand, Duke of Brunswick. Her daughter Caroline was the wife of George IV.

== Early life ==
Princess Augusta was born at St. James's Palace on 31 July 1737.

As she was the first born child of Frederick, Prince of Wales and the first born grandchild of George II of Great Britain and Caroline of Ansbach, Augusta was second in line for the throne of Great Britain, which changed a year later in 1738, when her brother Prince George (later George III of Great Britain) was born. Her mother was the Princess Augusta of Saxe-Gotha.

In the months before her birth, her father did not have a good relationship with his parents. In June 1737, Frederick announced to his parents that his wife would give birth in October. In reality, the birth was due earlier, and when Augusta went into labour, Frederick smuggled her out of Hampton Court Palace in the middle of the night, to prevent his parents from witnessing the birth. George and Caroline were horrified. Traditionally, royal births were witnessed by members of the family and senior courtiers to guard against supposititious children, and Augusta had been forced by her husband to ride in a rattling carriage for an hour and a half while heavily pregnant and in pain. With a party including her daughters Amelia and Caroline and Lord Hervey, Queen Caroline raced over to St James's Palace, where Frederick had taken Augusta. The delivery was traumatic: St James's was not ready to receive them, no bed was prepared, no sheets could be found, and Augusta was forced to give birth on a tablecloth. Caroline was relieved to discover that Augusta had given birth to a "poor, ugly little she-mouse", rather than a "large, fat, healthy boy" as the pitiful nature of the baby made a supposititious child unlikely.

Fifty days later, she was christened at St. James's Palace by the Archbishop of Canterbury. Her godparents were her paternal grandfather, the King (represented by his Lord Chamberlain, the Duke of Grafton), and her grandmothers, Queen Caroline and the Dowager Duchess of Saxe-Gotha (both represented by proxies).

Her third birthday was celebrated by the first public performance of the masque Alfred (1740) by Thomas Arne, performed at her father's residence at Cliveden. In its original form, Alfred contained only eight vocal sections and the overture, including the famous patriotic song "Rule, Britannia!".

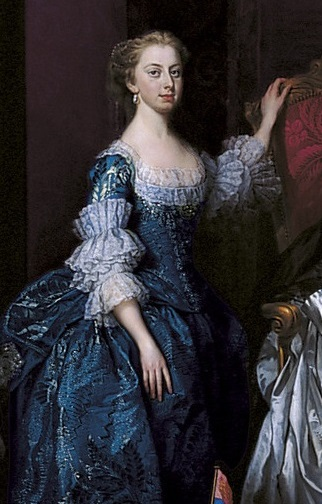
Augusta aged 14 in a family portrait of 1751 by George Knapton

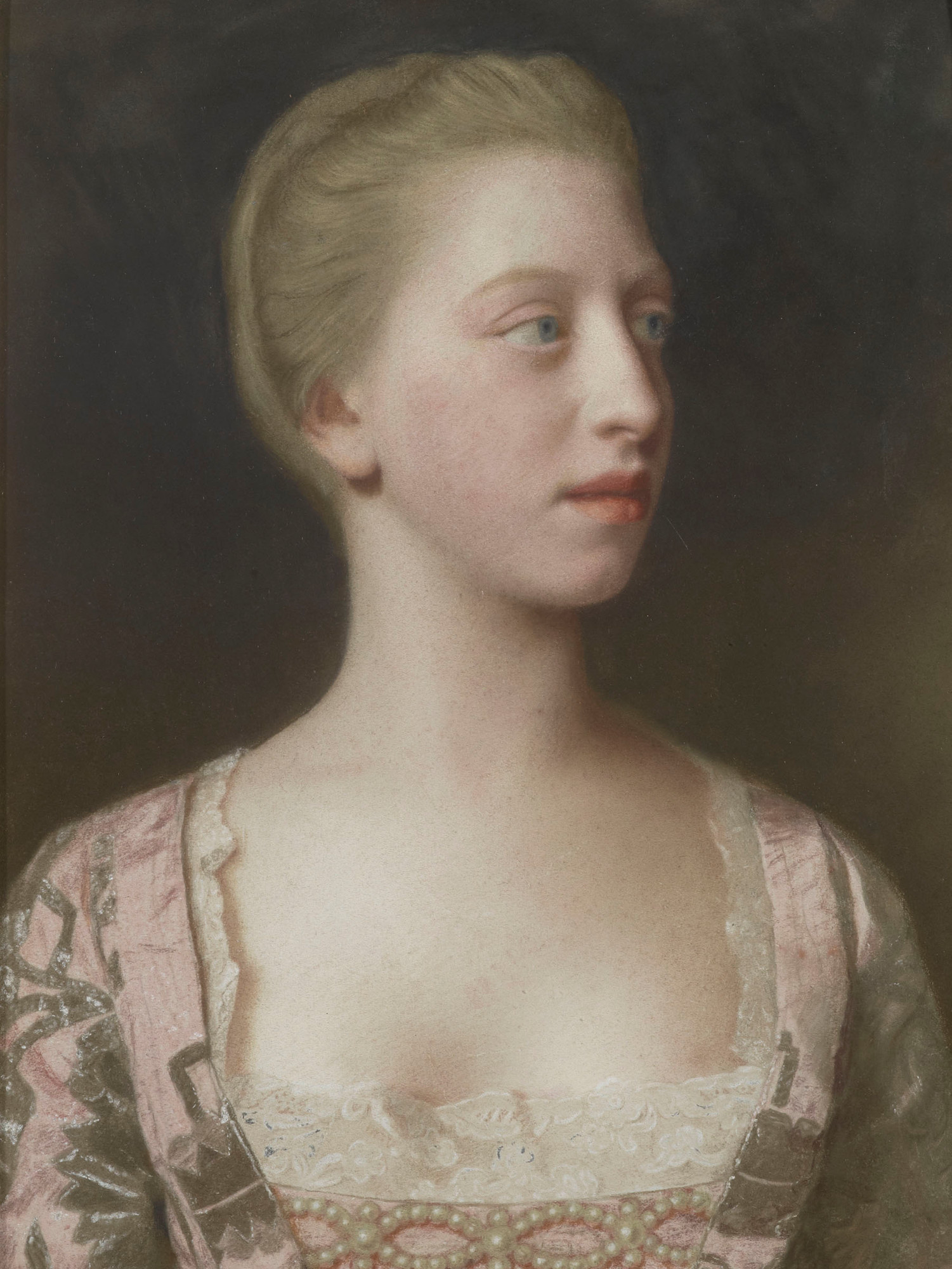
Princess Augusta, aged 17, by Liotard

Augusta was given a careful education. She was not described as a rare beauty, having a loose mouth and long face.

In 1761–63, a marriage was discussed between Augusta and her second cousin, Charles William Ferdinand, Duke of Brunswick-Wolfenbüttel. The negotiations were delayed because her mother disliked the House of Brunswick. This obstacle was overcome by a reason described by Horace Walpole:

"Lady Augusta was lively, and much inclined to meddle in the private politics of the Court. As none of her [The [Dowager] Princess [of Wales]'s] children but the King, had, or had reason to have, much affection for their mother, she justly apprehended Lady Augusta instilling their disgust on to the Queen. She could not forbid her daughter's frequent visits at Buckingham House, but to prevent ill consequence of them, she often accompanied her thither. This, however, was an attendance and a constraint the Princess of Wales could not support. Her exceeding indolence, her more excessive love of privacy, and the subjection of being frequently with the Queen, whose higher rank was a never ceasing mortification, all concurred to make her resolve, at any rate, to deliver herself of her daughter. To obtain this end, the profusion of favours to the hated House of Brunswick was not though too much. The Hereditary Prince was prevailed to accept Lady Augusta's hand, with four-score thousand pounds, an annuity of £5,000 a year on Ireland, and three thousand a year on Hanover."

The marriage agreement was announced to the House of Lords on 1 December 1763. On 16 January 1764, Augusta married Charles William Ferdinand at the Chapel Royal of St James's Palace. The wedding was followed by a state dinner at Leicester House, congratulations from the Houses of Parliament, a ball given by the Queen, and an opera performance at Covent Garden. The couple departed from Harwich on the 26th.

== Life in Brunswick ==
The Duchess never fully adapted to life in Brunswick. She always viewed Great Britain in very high regard all her life and disregarded anything "east of the Rhine". This attitude did not change with time, and twenty-five years after her marriage, she was described as "wholly English in her tastes, her principles and her manners, to the point that her almost cynical independence makes, with the etiquette of the German courts, the most singular contrast I know".

After her first pregnancy in 1764, she returned to Great Britain in the company of her husband to give birth to her second child. Whilst in England, it was noted that the couple were cheered on by crowds every time they showed themselves in public. This reportedly exposed them to suspicion at court. During their visit, her sister-in-law Queen Charlotte apparently refused them some honours at court, such as military salutes. This attracted negative publicity toward the hosting royal couple. During the negotiations thirty years later for the marriage of her daughter to the Prince of Wales, Augusta commented to the British negotiator, Lord Malmesbury, that Queen Charlotte disliked both her and her mother because of jealousy dating from the visit of 1764.

Augusta saw the court of her mother-in-law as boring and dull, especially during the summer months when her husband was absent at camp. A summer retreat was built for her in the southern part of Braunschweig, where she could spend time away from court. It was built by Carl Christoph Wilhelm Fleischer and called Schloss Richmond to remind her of England. In her retreat, Augusta amused herself by spending her days eating heavy luncheons, gossiping and playing cards with her favourites, often receiving English guests.

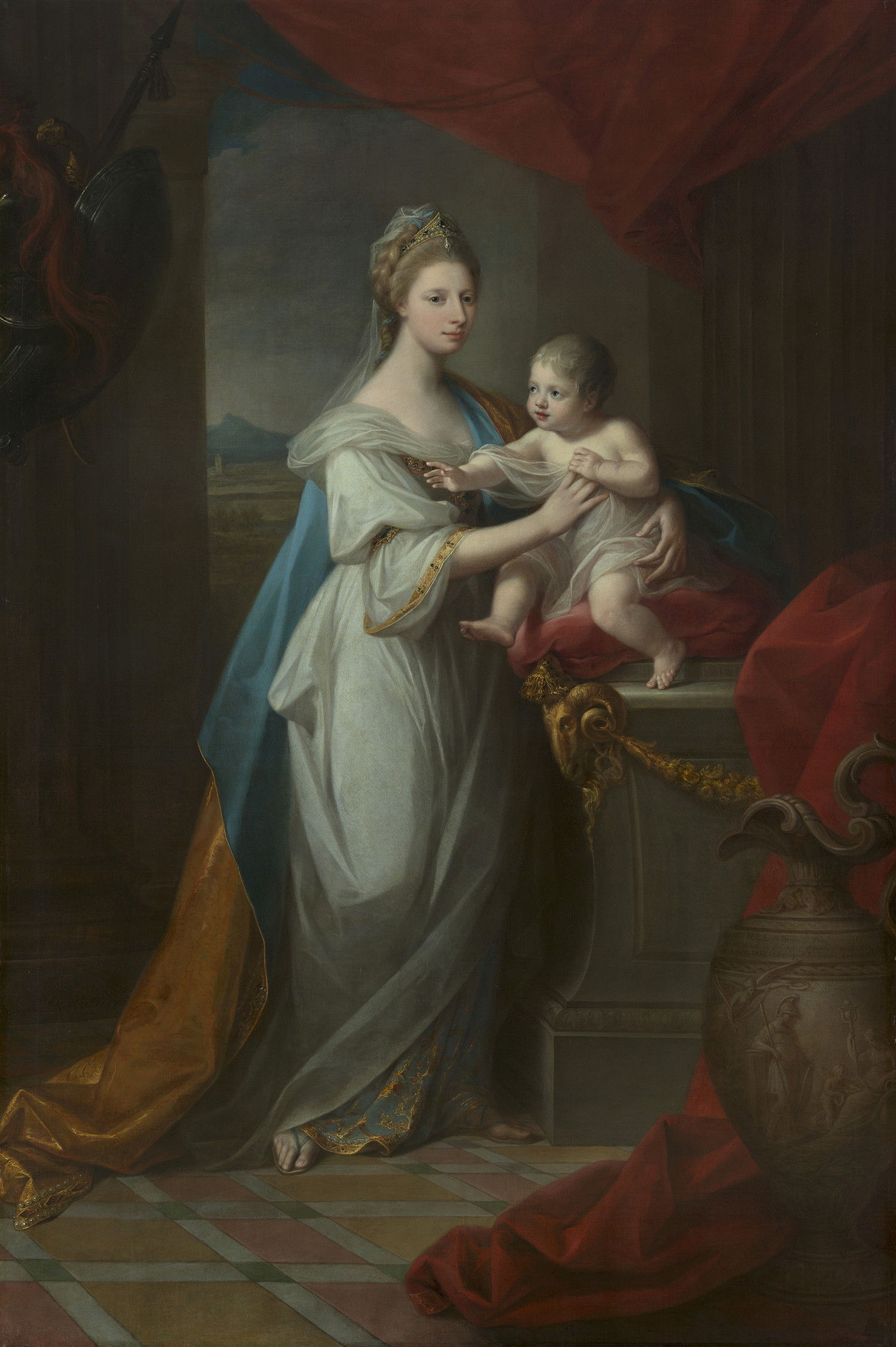
Augusta by Angelica Kauffman, 1767; Royal Collection, London

The marriage of Augusta and Charles was arranged for dynastic purposes; but Augusta thought Charles very handsome and was initially pleased with him. Shortly after the birth of her first daughter, she wrote: "No two people live better together than we do, and I would go through fire and water for him", and it was noted that she seemed to be unaware of his flirtations in London.

In 1771–72, Augusta visited England on her mother's invitation. On this occasion, she was involved in another conflict with her sister-in-law Queen Charlotte. She was not allowed to live at Carlton House or St. James Palace even though it was empty at the time, but was forced to live in a small house on Pall Mall. The queen disagreed with Augusta about etiquette, and refused to let her see George III alone. According to Mr. Walpole, the reason was jealousy on the part of the queen. Augusta attended her mother's deathbed during her second visit to England, and upon her return to Brunswick, extended her period of mourning, which eventually led to her retirement from participation in court life.

When her sister, Queen Caroline Matilda of Denmark, was convicted of adultery and exiled near Brunswick in Celle, Augusta would regularly visit her for weeks on end, much to the disapproval of her husband and parents-in-law .

In 1777, Augusta announced to her husband that she would retire from court life to oversee the upbringing of their children and perform religious studies under the Bishop of Fürstenberg. The reason was her disapproval of the relationship between Charles and Louise Hertefeld whom he, in contrast to his previous mistress Maria Antonia Branconi, had installed as his official royal mistress at the Brunswick court.

In 1780, Charles succeeded his father as sovereign Duke of Brunswick, and Augusta thus became Duchess consort.

Of Augusta's four sons, the eldest three were born with disabilities. The Swedish Princess Hedwig Elizabeth Charlotte described her, as well as her family, at the time of a visit in August, 1799:

Our cousin, the Duke, arrived immediately the next morning. As a noted military man he has won many victories, he is witty, literal and a pleasant acquaintance, but ceremonial beyond description. He is said to be quite strict, but a good father of the nation who attends to the needs of his people. After he left us, I visited the Dowager Duchess, the aunt of my consort. She is an agreeable, highly educated and well respected lady, but by now so old that she has almost lost her memory. From her I continued to the Duchess, sister to the King of England and a typical English woman. She looked very simple, like a vicar's wife, has I am sure many admirable qualities and are very respectable, but completely lacks manners. She makes the strangest questions without considering how difficult and unpleasant they can be. Both the Hereditary Princess as well as Princess Augusta — sister of the sovereign Duke — came to her while I was there. The former is delightful, mild, lovable, witty and clever, not a beauty but still very pretty. In addition, she is said to be admirably kind to her boring consort. The Princess Augusta is full of wit and energy and very amusing. [...]

The Duchess and the Princesses followed me to Richmond, the country villa of the Duchess a bit outside of town. It was small and pretty with a beautiful little park, all in an English style. As she had the residence constructed herself, it amuses her to show it to others. [...]

The sons of the Ducal couple are somewhat peculiar. The Hereditary Prince, chubby and fat, almost blind, strange and odd — if not to say an imbecile — attempts to imitate his father but only makes himself artificial and unpleasant. He talks continually, does not know what he says and is in all aspects unbearable. He is accommodating but a poor thing, loves his consort to the point of worship and is completely governed by her. The other son, Prince Georg, is the most ridiculous person imaginable, and so silly that he can never be left alone but is always accompanied by a courtier. The third son is also described as an original. I never saw him, as he served with his regiment. The fourth one is the only normal one, but also torments his parents by his immoral behaviour.

== Later life ==
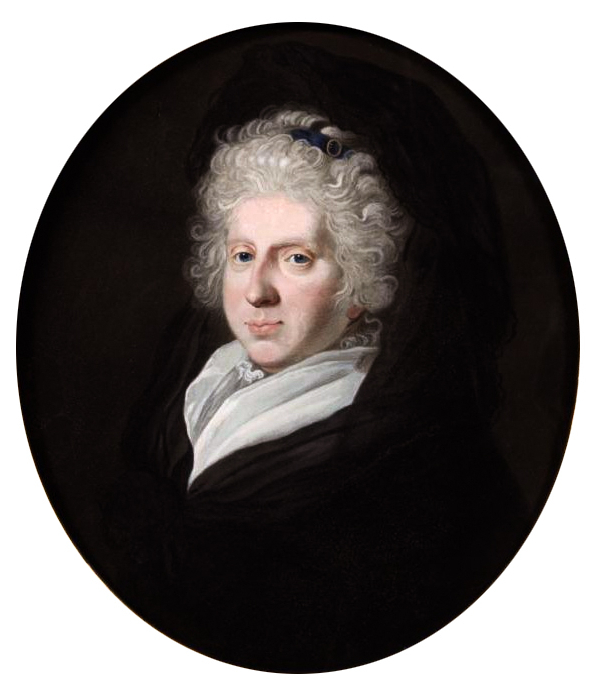
Augusta in later life

In 1806, when Prussia declared war on France, her husband, the Prince of Brunswick-Wolfenbuttel, 71 at the time, was appointed commander-in-chief of the Prussian army. On 14 October of that year, at the Battle of Jena, Napoleon defeated the Prussian army; and on the same day, at the Battle of Auerstadt, the Prince was seriously wounded, dying a few days later. Augusta, with the Hereditary Prince and Hereditary Princess, fled to Altona, where they were present at her dying spouse's side. Because of the advancing French army, they were advised by the British ambassador to flee, and they left shortly before the death of the Prince.

Annuity to Duchess of Brunswick Wolfenbuttel Act 1808
- Act of Parliament
- Parliament of the United Kingdom
- Long title: An Act for enabling His Majesty to settle an Annuity on Her Royal Highness the Duchess of Brunswick Wolfenbuttel.
- Citation: 48 Geo. 3. c. 59
- Territorial extent: United Kingdom

Dates
- Royal assent: 1 June 1808
- Commencement: 1 June 1808 (Note: The Acts of Parliament (Commencement) Act 1793.)
- Repealed: 10 August 1872
Other legislation
Repealed by	Statute Law Revision Act 1872

Status: Repealed

Text of statute as originally enacted

They were invited to Sweden by the Hereditary Princess's brother-in-law King Gustav IV Adolf of Sweden. However, Augusta preferred to stay at the Duchy of Augustenborg, where her nephew-in-law was sovereign. She remained there with her niece, the Duchess of Augustenborg (daughter of her sister the late Queen Caroline Mathilde of Denmark), until her brother George III of the United Kingdom finally relented in September 1807, and allowed Augusta to come to London. There she resided at Montagu House, at Blackheath in Greenwich, with her daughter, the Princess of Wales, but soon Augusta fell out with her, and purchased the house next door, Brunswick House. Augusta lived out her days there and died in 1813 aged 75. She was buried in the Royal Vault at St George's Chapel, Windsor Castle. Through her great-granddaughter Princess Pauline of Württemberg, she is an ancestress of the present Belgian, Danish, Dutch, Luxembourgish, Norwegian, and Swedish royal families.

== Arms ==
Augusta was granted use of the arms of the kingdom, differenced by a label argent of five points, the centre bearing a cross gules, the other points each bearing a rose gules.

== Ancestors ==
Ancestors of Princess Augusta of Great Britain

8. George I of Great Britain
4. George II of Great Britain
9. Duchess Sophia Dorothea of Brunswick-Celle
2. Frederick, Prince of Wales
10. John Frederick, Margrave of Brandenburg-Ansbach
5. Princess Caroline of Brandenburg-Ansbach
11. Princess Eleonore Erdmuthe of Saxe-Eisenach
1. Princess Augusta of Great Britain
12. Frederick I, Duke of Saxe-Gotha-Altenburg
6. Frederick II, Duke of Saxe-Gotha-Altenburg
13. Princess Magdalena Sibylle of Saxe-Weissenfels
3. Princess Augusta of Saxe-Gotha
14. Charles, Prince of Anhalt-Zerbst
7. Princess Magdalena Augusta of Anhalt-Zerbst
15. Princess Sophia of Saxe-Weissenfels

== Issue ==
Together the couple had 7 children:

Name	Birth	Death	Notes
Duchess Augusta	3 December 1764	27 September 1788	married 1780, Duke Frederick of Württemberg; had issue
Hereditary Prince Karl Georg	8 February 1766	20 September 1806	married 1790, Princess Louise of Orange-Nassau; no issue
Duchess Caroline	17 May 1768	7 August 1821	married 1795, George IV of the United Kingdom; had issue
Duke Georg William	27 June 1769	16 September 1811	Declared an invalid; Excluded from line of succession
Duke August	18 August 1770	18 December 1822	Declared an invalid; Excluded from line of succession
Duke Frederick William	9 October 1771	16 June 1815	married 1802, Princess Marie of Baden; had issue
Duchess Amelie	22 November 1772	2 April 1773

== Bibliography ==
- Beckett, William A.: Universal Biography. London: Isaac, 1836.
- Kwan, Elisabeth E.; Röhrig, Anna E.: Frauen vom Hof der Welfen. Göttingen: MatrixMedia 2006, ISBN 3-932313-17-8, p. 115−126.
