= Karl Georg August, Hereditary Prince of Brunswick-Wolfenbüttel =

Karl Georg August
- Hereditary Prince of Brunswick-Wolfenbüttel
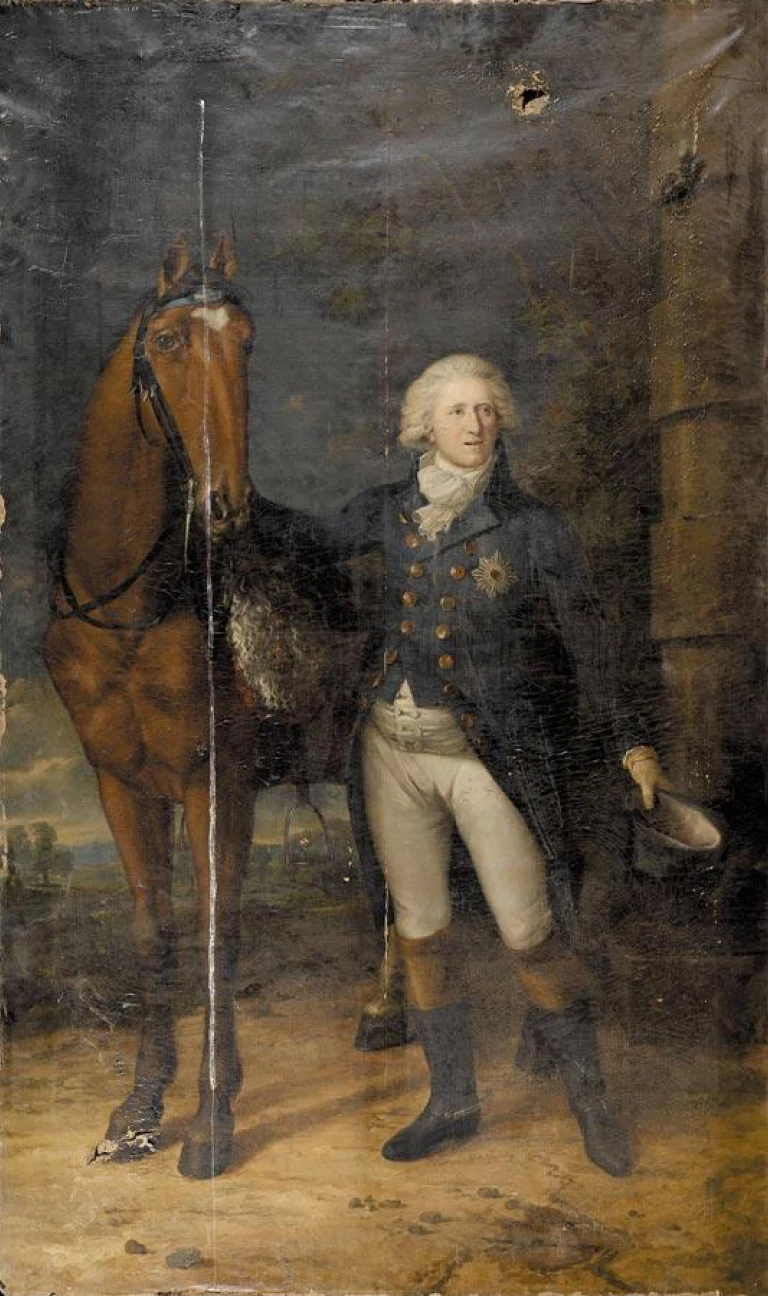
- Portrait by Friedrich Georg Weitsch, 1790s
- Born: 8 February 1766; London, England
- Died: 20 September 1806 (aged 40); Antoinettenruh, Principality of Brunswick-Wolfenbüttel
- Spouse: Princess Louise of Orange-Nassau (m. 1790)
- House: Brunswick-Bevern
- Father: Charles William Ferdinand, Duke of Brunswick
- Mother: Princess Augusta of Great Britain

Karl Georg August, Hereditary Prince of Brunswick-Wolfenbüttel (English: Charles George Augustus; 8 February 1766 – 20 September 1806) was the heir to the Duchy of Brunswick as the eldest son of Charles William Ferdinand, Duke of Brunswick-Wolfenbüttel and Princess Augusta of Great Britain.

== Life ==
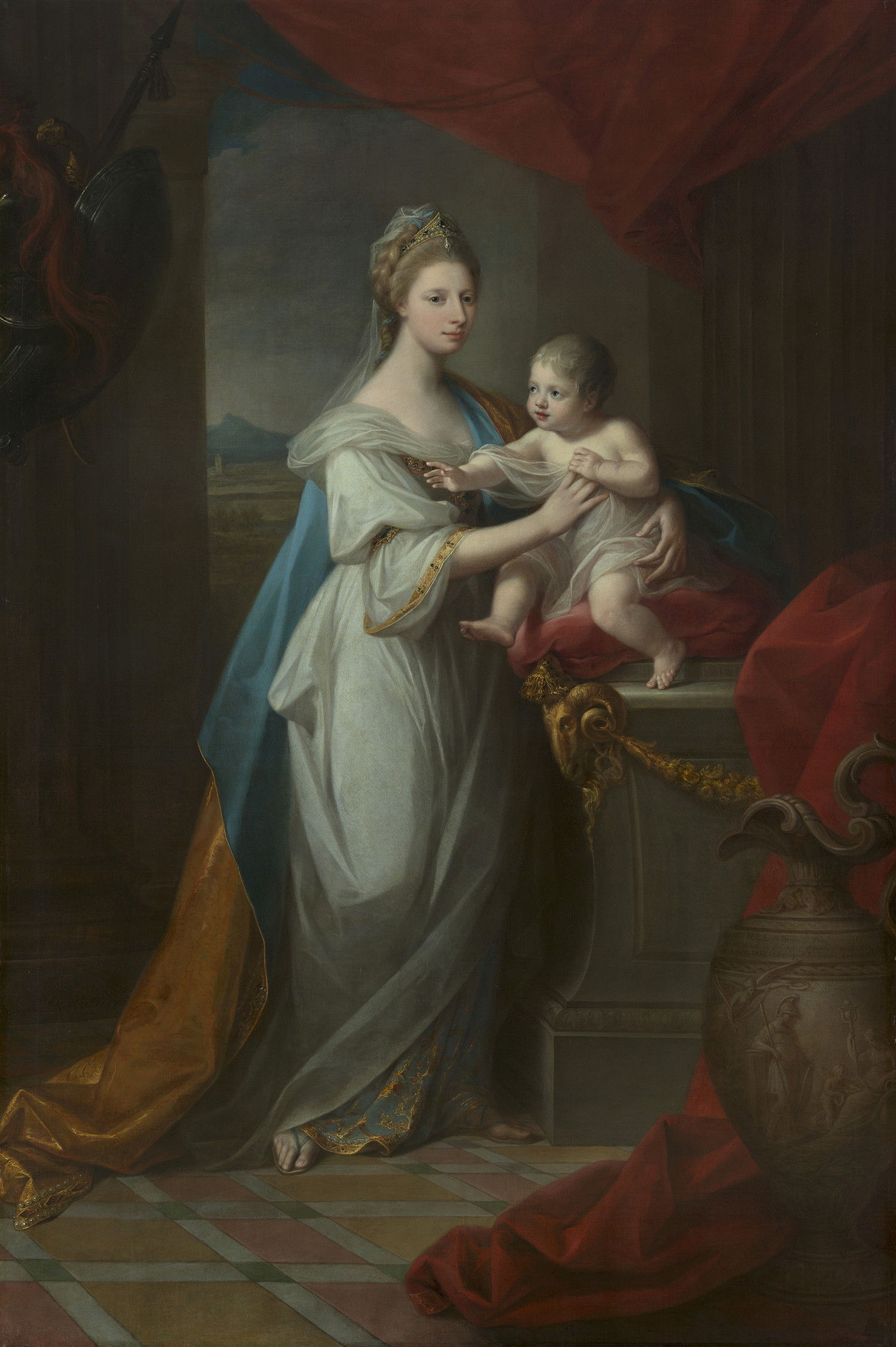
Karl as an infant with his mother in 1767, by Angelica Kauffman

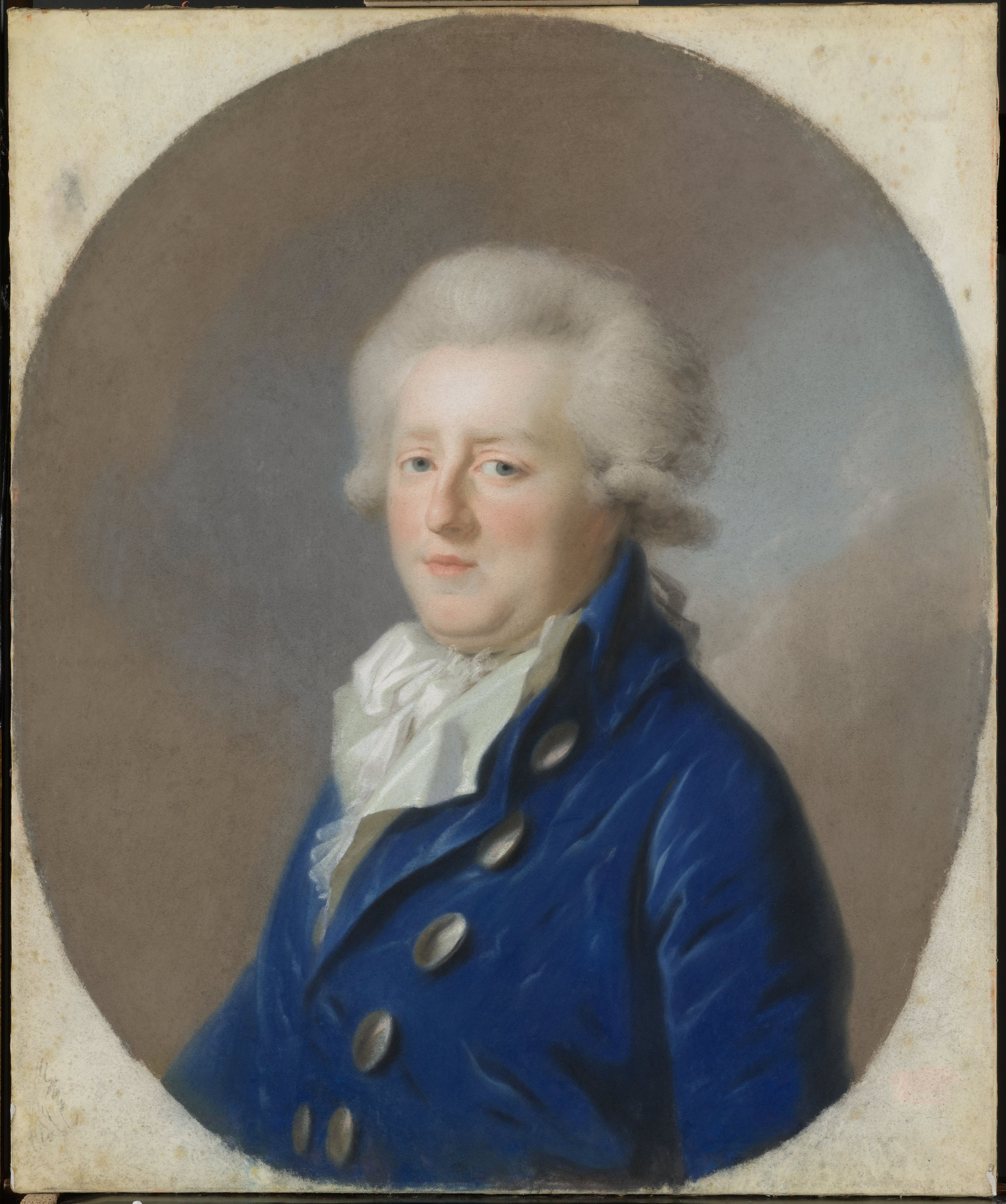
Portrait by Johann Friedrich August Tischbein, c. 1785–1795

Prince Karl Georg August of Brunswick-Wolfenbüttel was born in London on 8 February 1766, the second of Charles William Ferdinand, Duke of Brunswick-Wolfenbüttel and Princess Augusta of Great Britain's seven children. Prince Karl's mother was the eldest sister of King George III of the United Kingdom, and a granddaughter of King George II of Great Britain.

In 1789, his father formally made Princess Louise of Orange-Nassau a proposal of marriage on his behalf. The marriage was seen as a suitable gesture of gratitude and alliance between the House of Orange and his father, who had assisted the Orange dynasty during the Dutch rebellion in 1787.

The wedding was conducted on 14 October 1790 in The Hague, and the couple settled in Brunswick.

Prince Karl was born mentally ill and blind, and Louise was reportedly more of a caretaker than a spouse to him, who was described as being totally dependent on her. In 1791, she commented in a letter in which she expressed no lamentation about the fact that her marriage was childless and rather seemed pleased with it.

The Swedish Princess Hedwig Elizabeth Charlotte described him, as well as his family, at the time of a visit in August 1799:

Our cousin, the Duke, arrived immediately the next morning. As a noted military man he has won many victories, he is witty, literate and a pleasant acquaintance, but ceremonial beyond description. He is said to be quite strict, but a good father of the nation who attends to the needs of his people. After he left us, I visited the Dowager Duchess, the aunt of my consort. She is an agreeable, highly educated and well respected lady, but by now so old that she has almost lost her memory. From her I continued to the Duchess, sister to the King of England and a typical English woman. She looked very simple, like a vicar's wife, has I am sure many admirable qualities and are very respectable, but completely lacks manners. She makes the strangest questions without considering how difficult and unpleasant they can be. Both the Hereditary Princess as well as Princess Augusta – sister of the sovereign Duke – came to her while I was there. The former is delightful, mild, lovable, witty and clever, not a beauty but still very pretty. In addition, she is said to be admirably kind to her boring consort. The Princess Augusta is full of wit and energy and very amusing. [...] The Duchess and the Princesses followed me to Richmond, the country villa of the Duchess a bit outside of town. It was small and pretty with a beautiful little park, all in an English style. As she had the residence constructed herself, it amuses her to show it to others. [...] The sons of the Ducal couple are somewhat peculiar. The Hereditary Prince, chubby and fat, almost blind, strange and odd – if not to say an imbecile – attempts to imitate his father but only makes himself artificial and unpleasant. He talks continually, does not know what he says and is in all aspects unbearable. He is accommodating but a poor thing, loves his consort to the point of worship and is completely governed by her. The other son, Prince Georg, is the most ridiculous person imaginable, and so silly that he can never be left alone but is always accompanied by a courtier. The third son is also described as an original. I never saw him, as he served with his regiment. The fourth one is the only normal one, but also torments his parents by his immoral behavior.

The fact that the heir of the Duchy had no children, and was not expected to have any, resulted in him having to renounce his position as heir to his younger brother, Frederick William.

== Ancestry ==
Ancestors of Karl Georg August, Hereditary Prince of Brunswick-Wolfenbüttel

8. Ferdinand Albert II, Duke of Brunswick-Lüneburg
4. Charles I, Duke of Brunswick-Wolfenbüttel
9. Princess Antoinette of Brunswick-Wolfenbüttel
2. Charles William Ferdinand, Duke of Brunswick-Wolfenbüttel
10. Frederick William I of Prussia
5. Princess Philippine Charlotte of Prussia
11. Princess Sophia Dorothea of Hanover
1. Karl Georg August, Hereditary Prince of Brunswick-Wolfenbüttel
12. George II of Great Britain
6. Frederick, Prince of Wales
13. Princess Caroline of Brandenburg-Ansbach
3. Princess Augusta of Great Britain
14. Frederick II, Duke of Saxe-Gotha-Altenburg
7. Princess Augusta of Saxe-Gotha
15. Princess Magdalena Augusta of Anhalt-Zerbst
