= Princess Louise of Orange-Nassau =

Princess Louise
- Hereditary Princess of Brunswick-Wolfenbüttel
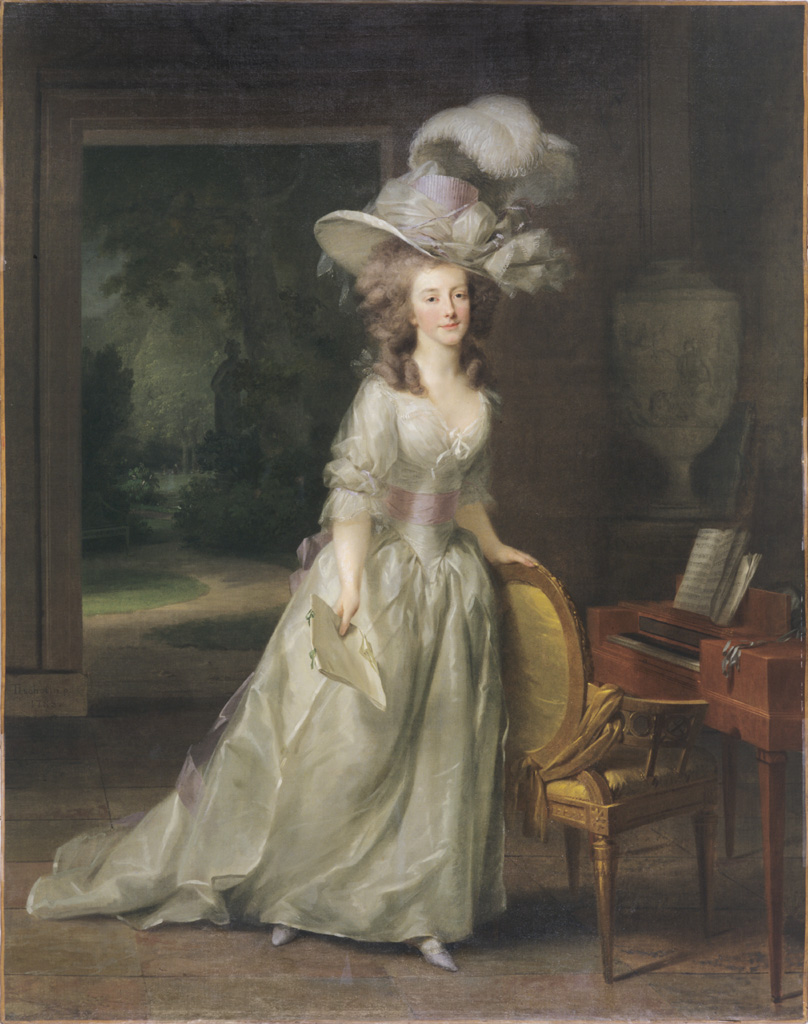
- Portrait in 1790 probably by Johann Friedrich August Tischbein
- Born: 28 November 1770; The Hague
- Died: 15 October 1819 (aged 48); Amsterdam
- Burial: 28 October 1819; Nieuwe Kerk, Delft
- Spouse: Karl Georg August, Hereditary Prince of Brunswick-Wolfenbüttel (m. 1790; died 1806)
Names
- Frederika Luise Wilhelmine
- House: Orange-Nassau
- Father: William V, Prince of Orange
- Mother: Wilhelmina of Prussia

Princess Frederica Louise Wilhelmina of Orange-Nassau (28 November 1770 – 15 October 1819) was a Hereditary Princess of Brunswick; married 14 October 1790 to Hereditary Prince Charles George August of Brunswick-Wolfenbüttel (1766 – 20 September 1806), son of Charles William Ferdinand, Duke of Brunswick-Wolfenbüttel. She was known in the family as "Loulou".

== Life ==
Louise was the daughter of William V, Prince of Orange and Wilhelmina of Prussia. In accordance to the new fashion of childcare in the late 18th-century, her mother supervised her upbringing personally in contrast to what had previously been the case for children of her class, and she was devoted to her mother and had a close relationship to her her entire life. Louise was educated by her governess Victoire E. Hollard and professor Herman Tollius and instructed in the Dutch language and Dutch religion, though her first language was French, as was the custom for European royalty at the time. She was interested in music, theater and writing, participated in amateur theater and was instructed in music by Johan Colizzi.

Louise was at one point proposed to by the Crown Prince of Prussia, but the plans were cancelled. In 1789, Charles William Ferdinand, Duke of Brunswick-Wolfenbüttel formally made her a proposal of marriage on behalf of his eldest son and heir, Karl Georg August, Hereditary Prince of Brunswick-Wolfenbüttel. The marriage was seen as a suitable gesture of gratitude and alliance between the House of Orange and the Duke of Brunswick, who had assisted her parents during the Dutch rebellion in 1787. Louise was not forced to agree, but reportedly, she accepted well aware of the fact that it was very difficult for her to find another spouse of suitable rank and religion.

The wedding was conducted 14 October 1790 in Haag, and the spouse settled in Brunswick. Louise was reportedly homesick in Brunswick, experienced a difficulty to adapt to new customs and missed the more vivid culture life in the Netherlands. She started a correspondence with her mother, her governess and former tutor which is preserved and regarded as an important source of contemporary life at the Brunswick court. Her spouse was born with an intellectual disability as well as being blind and she was reportedly more of a nurse than a spouse to him, who was described as totally dependent of her. In 1791, she commented in a letter in which she expressed no lamentation about the fact that her marriage was childless and rather seemed pleased with it. The fact that the heir of the Duchy had not children and was not expected to have any, resulted in him having to renounce his position as heir to his younger brother. When her parents was forced to flee the Netherlands in 1795, she lost her personal income and became financially dependent on her in-laws.

The Swedish Princess Hedwig Elizabeth Charlotte described her, as well as her family, at the time of her visit in August, 1799:

Our cousin, the Duke, arrived immediately the next morning. As a noted military man he has won many victories, he is witty, literal and a pleasant acquaintance, but ceremonial beyond description. He is said to be quite strict, but a good father of the nation who attends to the needs of his people. After he left us, I visited the Dowager Duchess, the aunt of my consort. She is an agreeable, highly educated and well respected lady, but by now so old that she has almost lost her memory. From her I continued to the Duchess, sister to the King of England and a typical English woman. She looked very simple, like a vicar's wife, has I am sure many admirable qualities and are very respectable, but completely lacks manners. She makes the strangest questions without considering how difficult and unpleasant they can be. Both the Hereditary Princess as well as Princess Augusta – sister of the sovereign Duke – came to her while I was there. The former is delightful, mild, lovable, witty and clever, not a beauty but still very pretty. In addition, she is said to be admirably kind to her boring consort. The Princess Augusta is full of wit and energy and very amusing. [...] The Duchess and the Princesses followed me to Richmond, the country villa of the Duchess a bit outside of town. It was small and pretty with a beautiful little park, all in an English style. As she had the residence constructed herself, it amuses her to show it to others. [...] The sons of the Ducal couple are somewhat peculiar. The Hereditary Prince, chubby and fat, almost blind, strange and odd – if not to say an imbecile – attempts to imitate his father but only makes himself artificial and unpleasant. He talks continually, does not know what he says and is in all aspects unbearable. He is accommodating but a poor thing, loves his consort to the point of worship and is completely governed by her. The other son, Prince Georg, is the most ridiculous person imaginable, and so silly that he can never be left alone but is always accompanied by a courtier. The third son is also described as an original. I never saw him, as he served with his regiment. The fourth one is the only normal one, but also torments his parents by his immoral behavior.

In 1806, she was widowed, and when her father died in exile, her widowed mother joined her in Brunswick. The same year, the Duchy was invaded by France, and she left Brunswick for Switzerland with her mother. She and her mother experienced a difficult period travelling with little money. In 1807, they finally reached her mother's family in Prussia, where they settled. She eventually joined her former husband's family in England. In 1814, she settled in the Netherlands with her mother, spending the winters in the Hague and the summers in the country estate Zorgvliet outside Haarlem nearby her mother's estate.

== Ancestry ==
Ancestors of Princess Louise of Orange-Nassau

8. John William Friso, Prince of Orange
4. William IV, Prince of Orange
9. Princess Marie Louise of Hesse-Kassel
2. William V, Prince of Orange
10. George II of Great Britain
5. Anne, Princess Royal
11. Princess Caroline of Brandenburg-Ansbach
1. Princess Louise of Orange-Nassau
12. Frederick William I of Prussia
6. Prince Augustus William of Prussia
13. Princess Sophia Dorothea of Hanover
3. Princess Wilhelmina of Prussia
14. Ferdinand Albert II, Duke of Brunswick-Wolfenbüttel
7. Duchess Luise of Brunswick-Wolfenbüttel
15. Princess Antoinette of Brunswick-Wolfenbüttel
