= Battle of Ölper =

The Battle of Ölper may refer to one of two battles at Ölper, now a district of Brunswick in Lower Saxony:

- Battle of Ölper (1761)
- Battle of Ölper (1809)
