= Battle of Halberstadt =

1809 battle of the War of the Fifth Coalition

- Part of the War of the Fifth Coalition
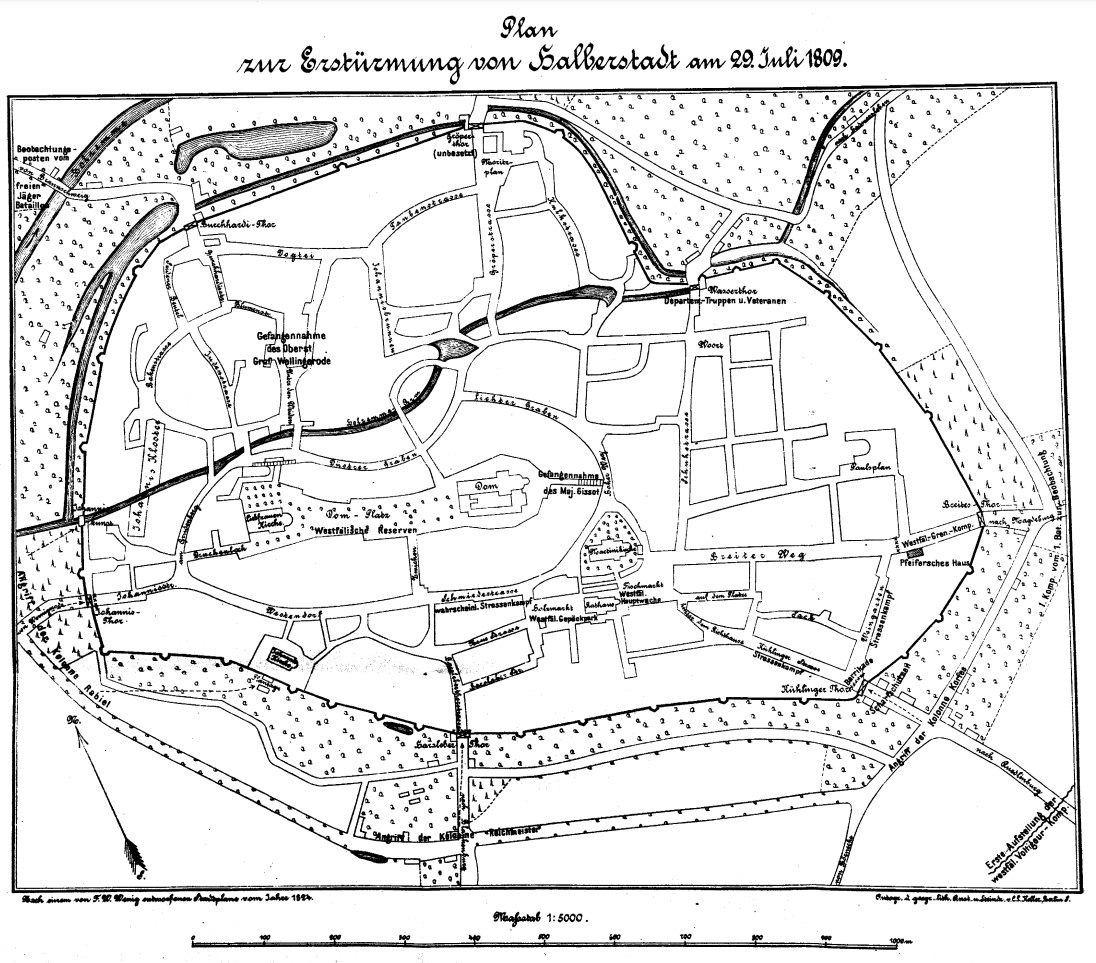
- Plan of the battle
Date	29 to 30 July 1809
Location	Halberstadt, now in the German state of Saxony-Anhalt 51°53′45″N 11°2′48″E
Result	Brunswick victory

Belligerents
Black Brunswickers	Kingdom of Westphalia

Commanders and leaders
Frederick William, Duke of Brunswick-Wolfenbüttel	Pierre Simon Mayronnet, Count Wellingerode

Strength
2,110	1,980 plus local troops

Casualties and losses
c. 400 killed or wounded	c. 600 killed or wounded 2,080 captured

War of the Fifth Coalition:
Rebellion Brunswick
The color black indicates the current battle.

The Battle of Halberstadt took place between 29 and 30 July 1809 at Halberstadt in the Kingdom of Westphalia, during the War of the Fifth Coalition. A Westphalian infantry force attempted to halt the Black Brunswickers under Frederick William, Duke of Brunswick-Wolfenbüttel who were heading for the North Sea coast. However, the Brunswickers surprised the Westphalians with a rapid advance and defeated them inside the town.

== Background ==
Frederick William, Duke of Brunswick-Wolfenbüttel lost his father in battle and his duchy to Napoleon Bonaparte who incorporated it in his Kingdom of Westphalia in 1807, ruled by his brother Jérôme Bonaparte. In exile in Austrian controlled Bohemia, Duke Frederick raised a volunteer force or freikorps to fight the French and their German allies. The volunteers were equipped by the Austrian Empire; the main colour of their uniforms was black, giving rise to the epithet of Schwarze Schar ("Black Horde") but were known in English as the "Black Brunswickers". The corps campaigned with the Austrian Army in the summer of 1809, but when the Austrians concluded the Armistice of Znaim on 12 July, the duke refused to be bound by it and declared his intention to join with the forces of the United Kingdom, the only power of the Fifth Coalition who were still fighting Napoleon.

The Duke of Brunswick and his corps began their remarkable fighting march towards the north German coast from Zwickau on 24 July. Entering the town of Halle in Westphalia on 26 July, the duke appropriated its civic funds. This prompted Jérôme to order three generals, Jean-Jacques Reubell (also spelt Reubel or Rewbel in various accounts), Pierre Guillaume Gratien and Claude Ignace François Michaud, to gather their forces and destroy the Brunswickers.

== Battle ==
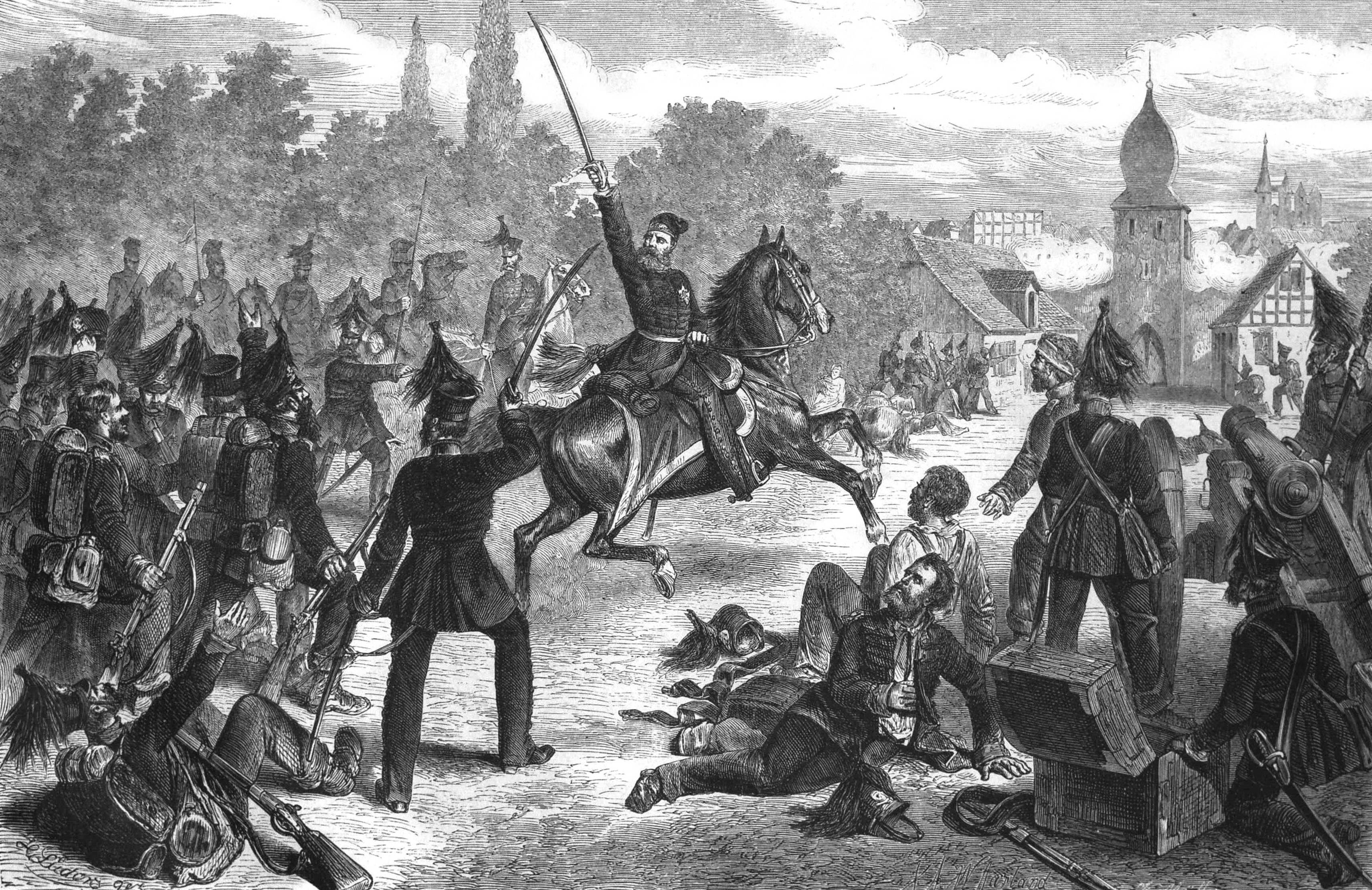
1870 illustration of Duke Frederick William leading the storming of Halberstadt

The nearest troops to the duke's line-of-march were the 1,980 strong 5th Westphalian Infantry Regiment, who formed the garrison of Magdeburg; they were ordered to join forces with Reubell's division before engaging the Brunswickers. The 5th Infantry, led by Colonel Pierre Simon Mayronnet (Count Wellingerode), reached Halberstadt at 11 am on 29 July, still 150 kilometres from Reubel. At 1 pm, local gendarmes warned Wellingerode that the Brunswickers were in Quedlinburg, some 14 kilometres distant. The Westphalians took little immediate action, possibly believing that the Brunswickers would take a considerable time to cover the distance and was apparently surprised to find that they were approaching the town at 5 pm. Sending out his voltigeurs to form a skirmish line, Wellingerode sent the rest of his infantry to defend the gates of the medieval town walls, supported by the troops of the town's garrison.

At 7 pm, the duke led one column against the Harsleber Gate while a second attacked the Kuhlinger Gate and a third, the Johannis Gate. Despite a spirited defence, all three gates were breached and obstructions, including carts full of manure, were cleared away. The Brunswickers rushed into the town shouting their battle cry of Seig oder todt! ("Victory or death!"); when the cavalry reached the main square they found the powerful regimental reserve, but this contingent, believing that they were surrounded by superior forces, surrendered. By midnight, most of the town was under Brunswick control; only the 5th Infantry's two grenadier companies held out by barricading themselves into some large houses, but finally surrendered at 5 am when the duke brought his artillery into position outside. Westphalian losses were about 600 dead and wounded, with 2,080 taken prisoner and the regimental colours captured. The Brunswick Corps lost about 400 killed and wounded.

== Aftermath ==
The Duke of Brunswick resumed his march on the same day, 30 July, taking with him 200 of his prisoners who had decided to join his corps. He headed first to his former capital, the city of Brunswick, where he hoped to gain more recruits; however, few were forthcoming. Although his path was successfully blocked by Reubell outside Brunswick at the Battle of Ölper on 1 August, the Westphalians gave away their advantage by withdrawing under cover of darkness and allowing the Black Brunswickers to continue their march northwards. Closely pursued by their enemies, they finally reached the coast at Elsfleth on 6 August, where they embarked on Royal Navy ships and sailed for England. The Brunswick Corps went on to fight with the British Army in the Peninsular War and the Waterloo Campaign.
