= Ölper =

Braunschweig-Ölper
- Quarter of Braunschweig
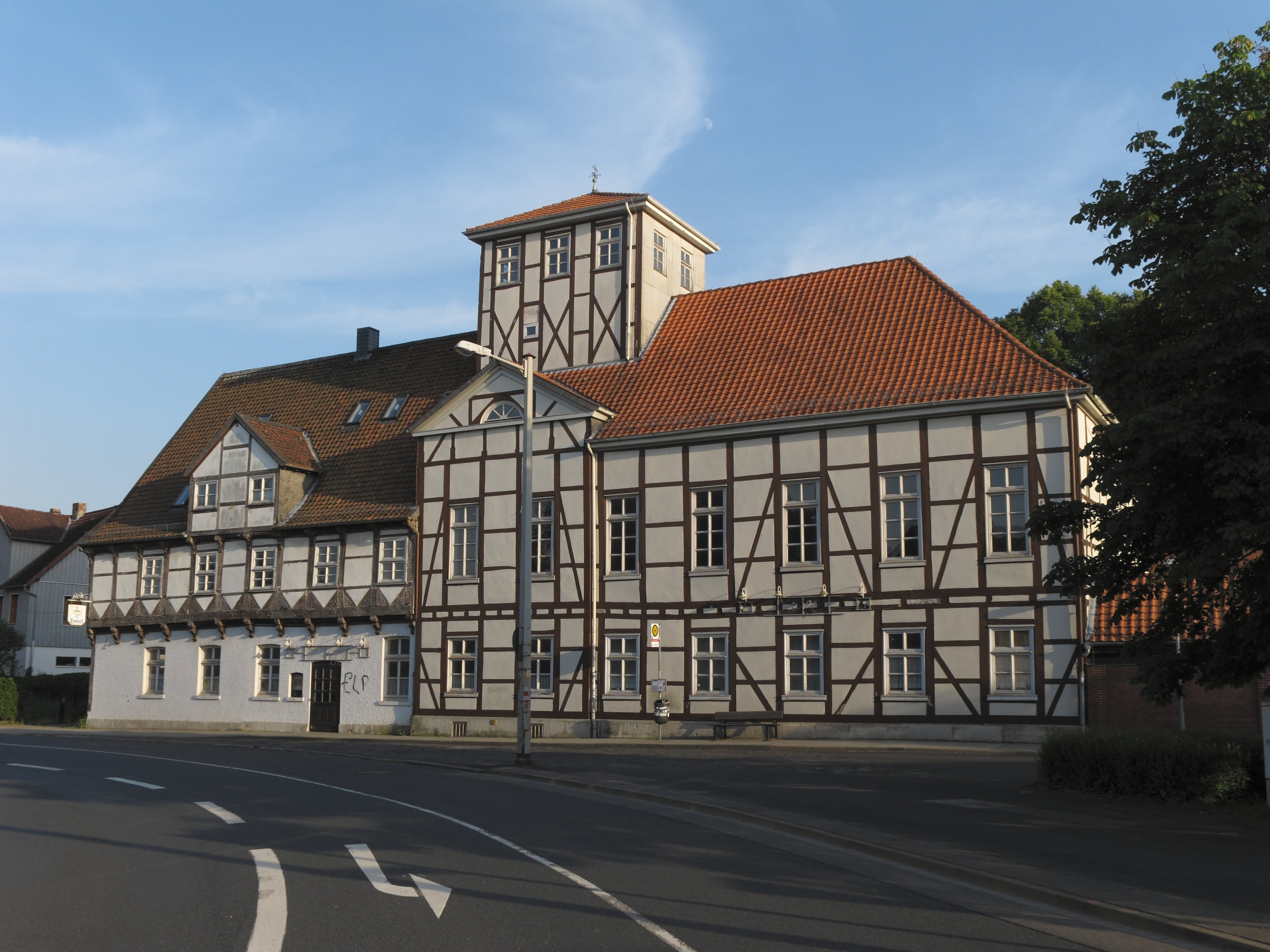
- Ölper Turm

- Coat of arms

- Location of Ölper within Braunschweig.
- Interactive map of Braunschweig-Ölper
- Location within Germany Location within Lower Saxony
- Coordinates: 52°17′10″N 10°29′48″E
- Country: Germany
- State: Lower Saxony
- District: urban district
- City: Braunschweig

Population (2016-12-31)
  - Total: 1,411
- Time zone: UTC+01:00 (CET)
  - Summer (DST): UTC+02:00 (CEST)
- Postal codes: 38114
- Dialling codes: 0531
- Vehicle registration: BS
- Website: Website

Ölper, formerly a village, is a quarter (Stadtteil) of the city of Braunschweig in Lower Saxony, Germany. It lies to the north of the city centre on the river Oker. It is part of the Stadtbezirk Lehndorf-Watenbüttel.

== History ==
The first mention of the village of Ölper, then called Elbere, is in 1251. In 1642, the Ölper Tower (Ölper Turm) was built as an outer defence for Braunschweig and a customs post, but it was demolished in 1825 and replaced with a dance hall which still carries the name. An important part of the early economy of Ölper was a large water mill, the Ölpermühle. At one time, the mill had eleven mill-wheels and was one of the largest mills in northern Germany. It fell out of use in the 19th century.

In 1761 during the Seven Years' War, a force of Brunswick and Hanoverian troops defeated a joint Franco-Saxon force in the first Battle of Ölper. In 1809, during the War of the Fifth Coalition, troops of the Kingdom of Westphalia attempted to block the advance of the Black Brunswickers under Frederick William, Duke of Brunswick-Wolfenbüttel in the second Battle of Ölper. Although the Brunswickers were unable to achieve a breakthrough, the Westphalians withdrew during the night allowing the Brunswickers to continue their march and ultimately escape to England.

The village of Ölper was incorporated into the city of Braunschweig in 1934. Recent developments have included the construction of a motorway junction in 1974–78 and the creation of the Ölpersee, a large lake in former gravel workings. Today, although it is now largely a dormitory suburb, there are still four active farms in Ölper including the only dairy farm within the city boundaries. Amongst local clubs and societies, BSV Ölper 2000 is the local association football team.

== Gallery ==
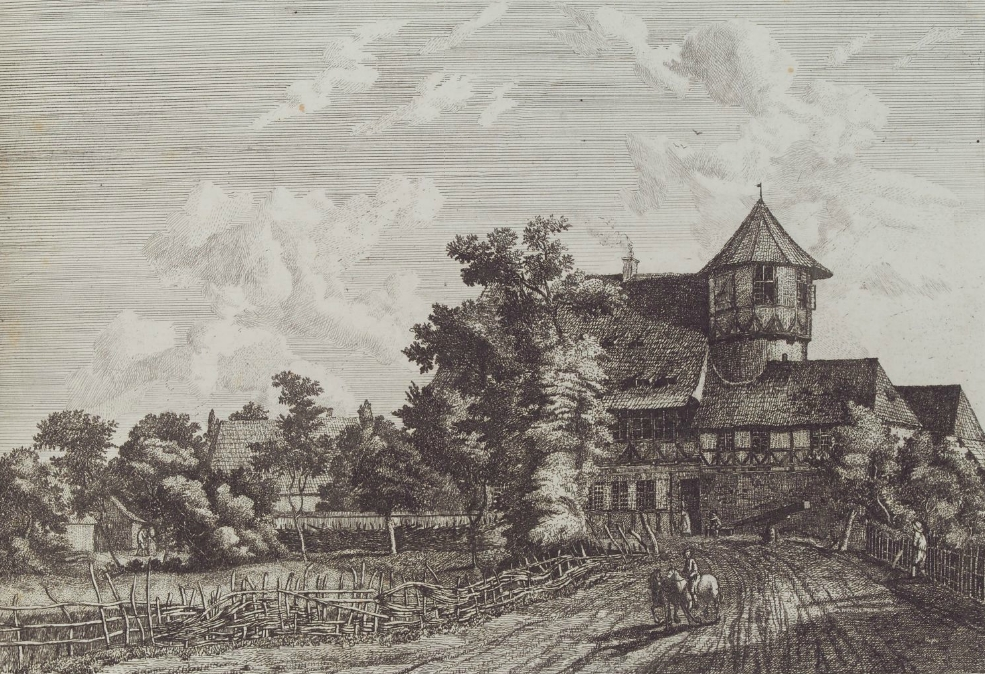
The original Ölper Tower, which was demolished in 1825.

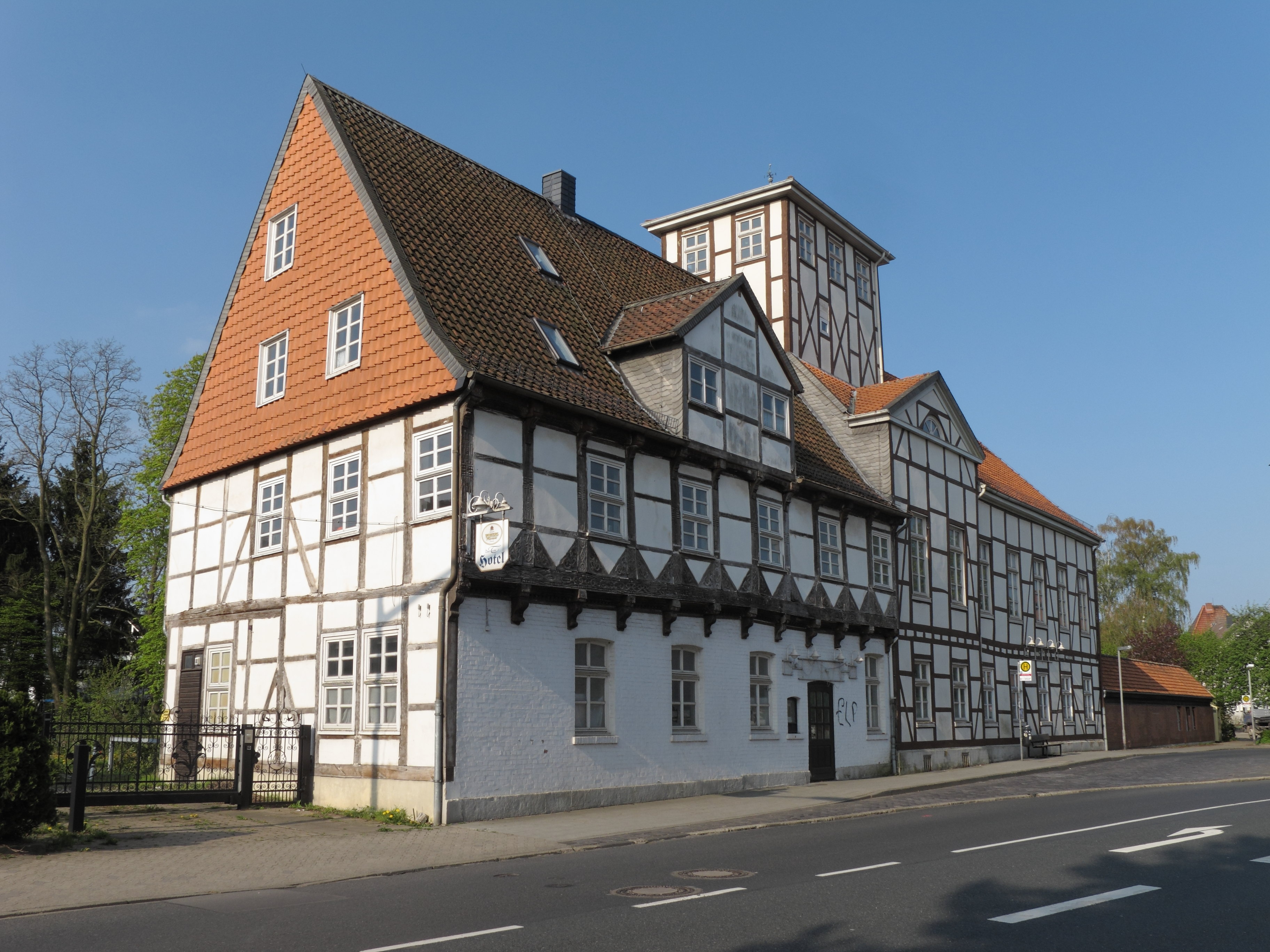
The present Ölper Tower.

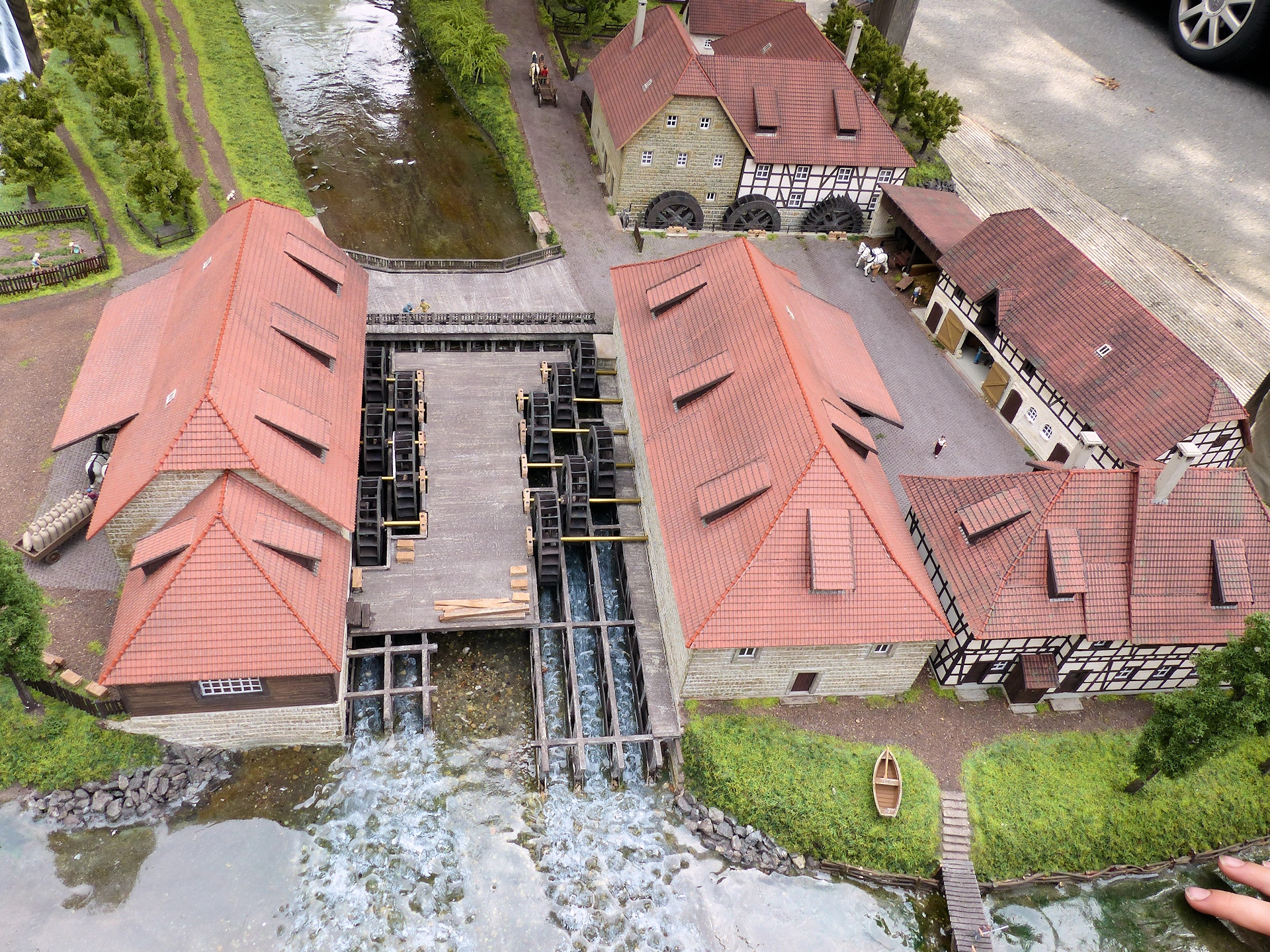
A model of Ölper Mill as it appeared in 1800.

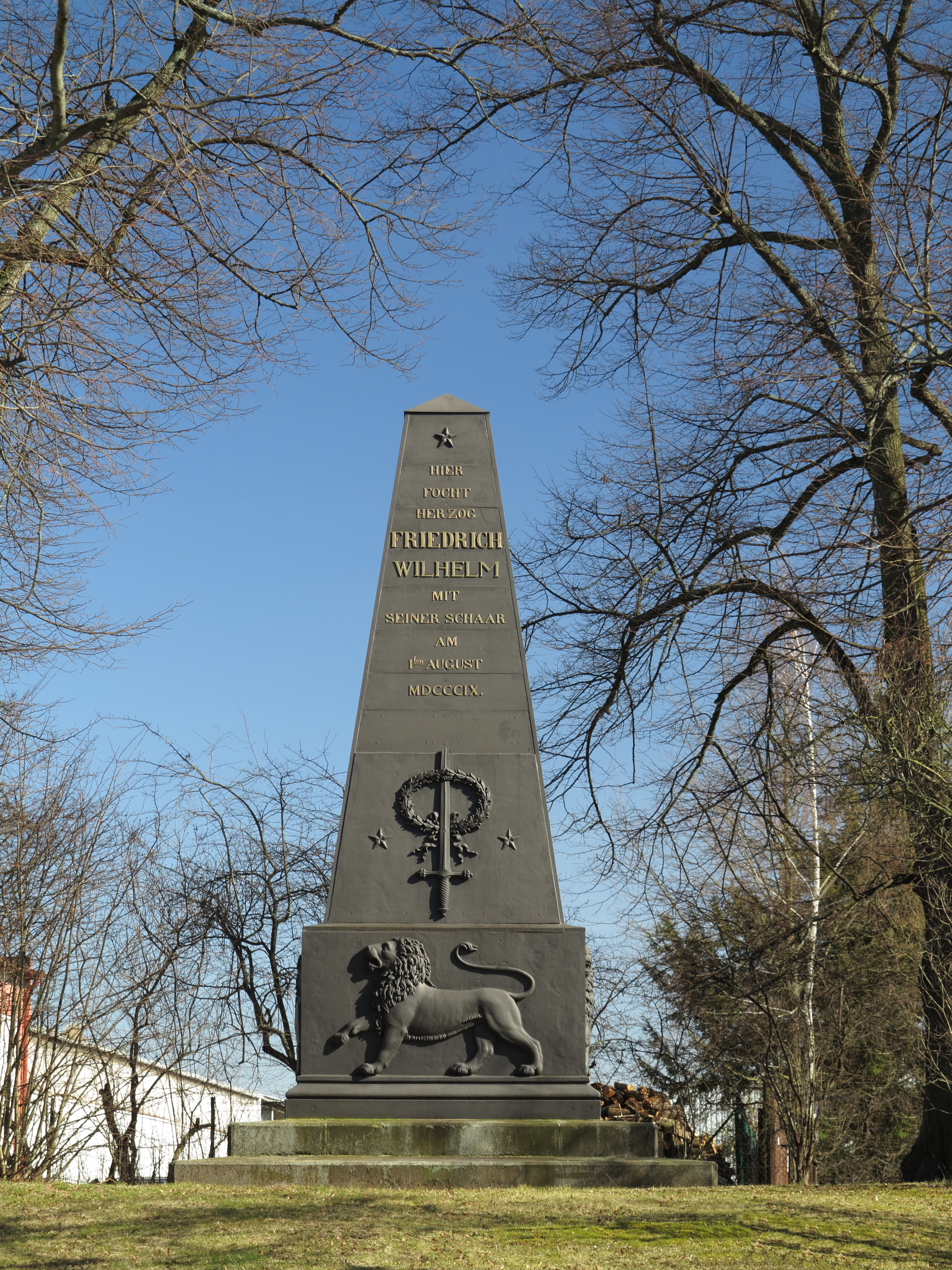
The memorial to the Battle of Ölper (1809).

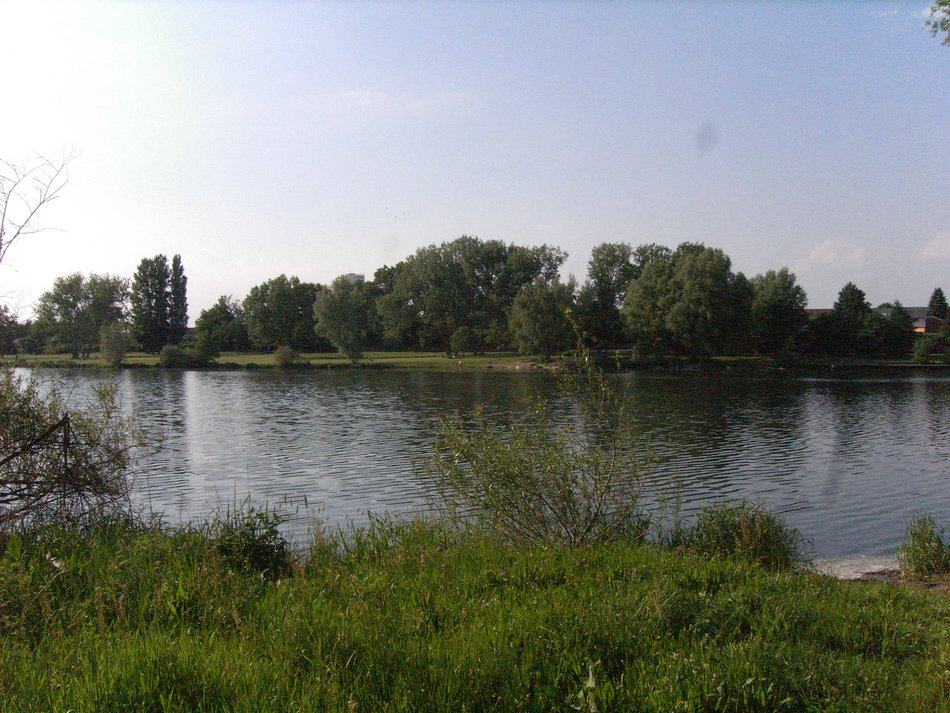
The Ölpersee, formerly gravel workings.
