= Lehndorf-Watenbüttel =

- Borough of Braunschweig
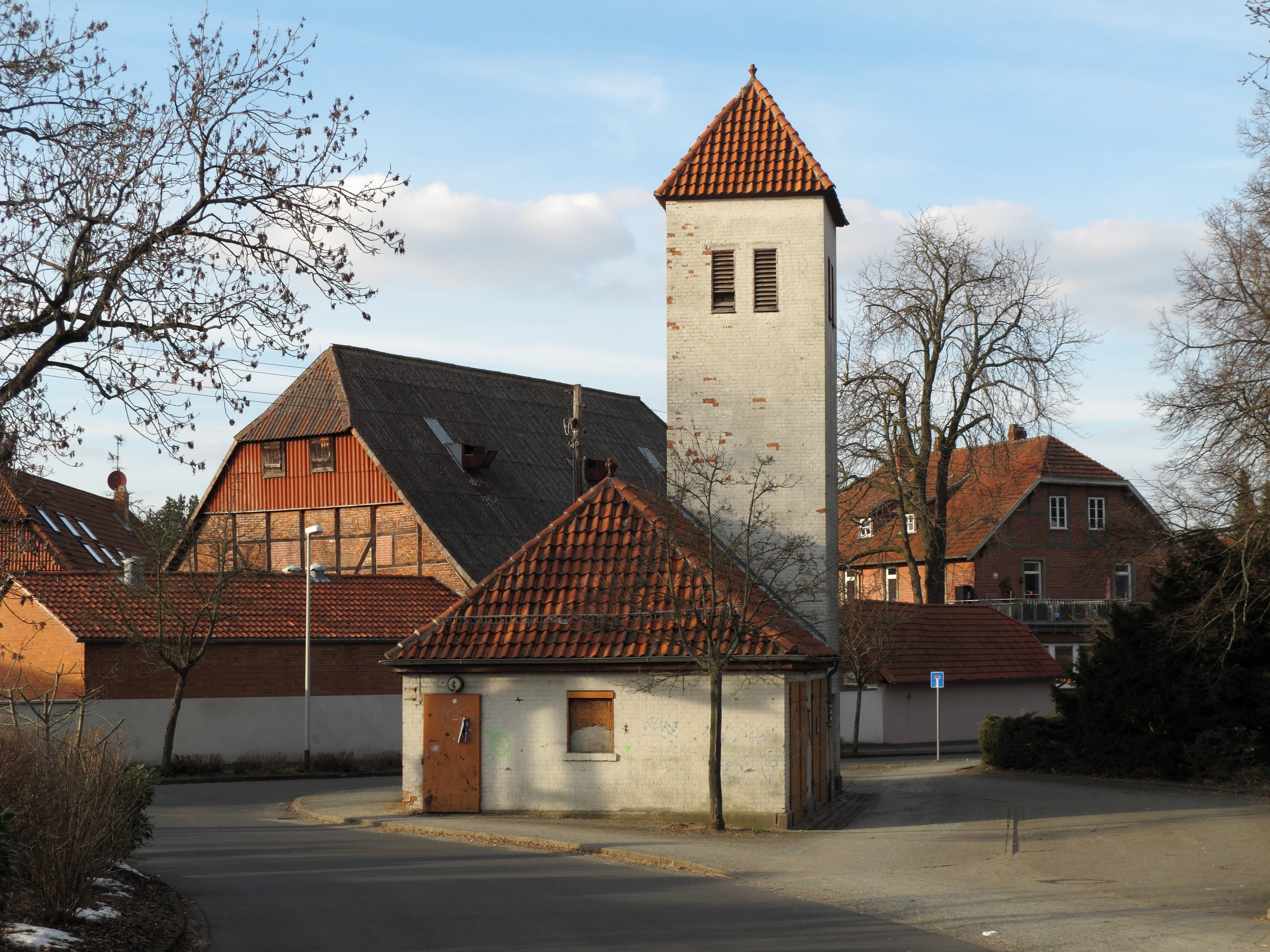
- Watenbüttel

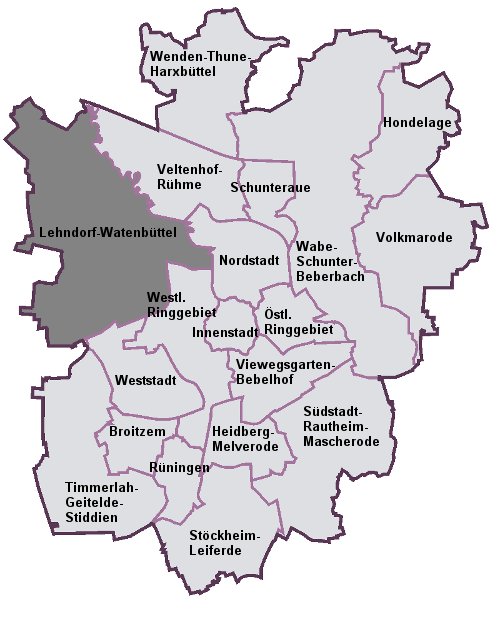
- Location of Lehndorf-Watenbüttel within Braunschweig
- Interactive map of Lehndorf-Watenbüttel
- Location within Germany Location within Lower Saxony
- Coordinates: 52°17′0″N 10°27′45″E
- Country: Germany
- State: Lower Saxony
- District: urban district
- City: Braunschweig

Government
  - Mayor: Frank Graffstedt (SPD)

Area
  - Total: 27.35 km^{2} (10.56 sq mi)

Population (2020-12-31)
  - Total: 21,857
  - Density: 799.2/km^{2} (2,070/sq mi)
- Time zone: UTC+01:00 (CET)
  - Summer (DST): UTC+02:00 (CEST)
- Postal codes: 38112, 38114, 38116
- Dialling codes: 0531
- Vehicle registration: BS

Lehndorf-Watenbüttel is a Stadtbezirk (borough) in the northwestern part of Braunschweig, Germany. The Stadtbezirk comprises the quarters Kanzlerfeld, Lamme, Lehndorf, Ölper, Völkenrode, and Watenbüttel.

== History ==
The district consists of several villages that were incorporated into Braunschweig during the 20th century, in 1934 (Lehndorf and Ölper) and in 1974 (Lamme, Völkenrode, and Watenbüttel), as well as the Kanzlerfeld, a new quarter built in the 1960s.

== Politics ==
The district mayor, Frank Graffstedt, is a member of the Social Democratic Party of Germany.

== Coats of arms ==
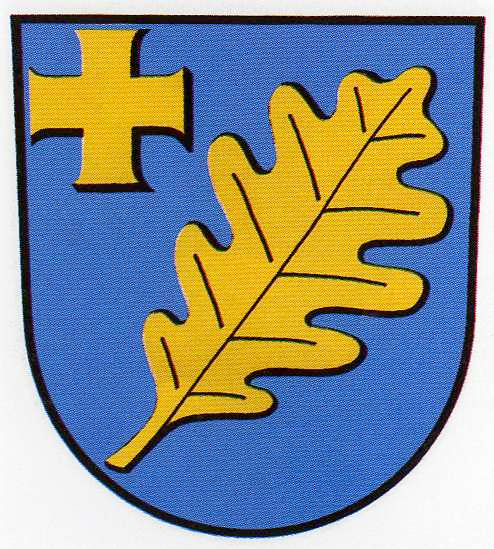
Coat of arms of Lamme

Coat of arms of Lehndorf

Coat of arms of Ölper

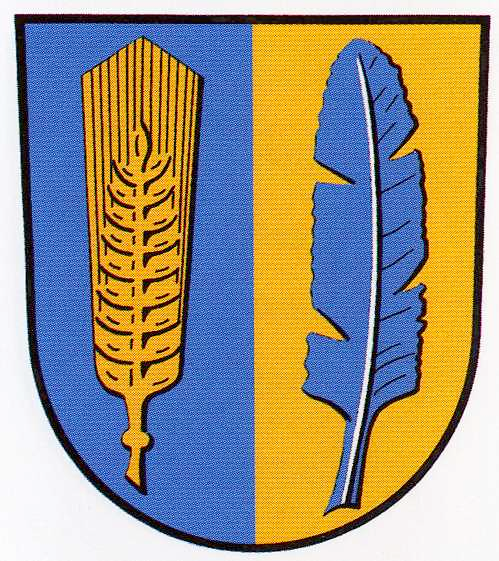
Coat of arms of Völkenrode

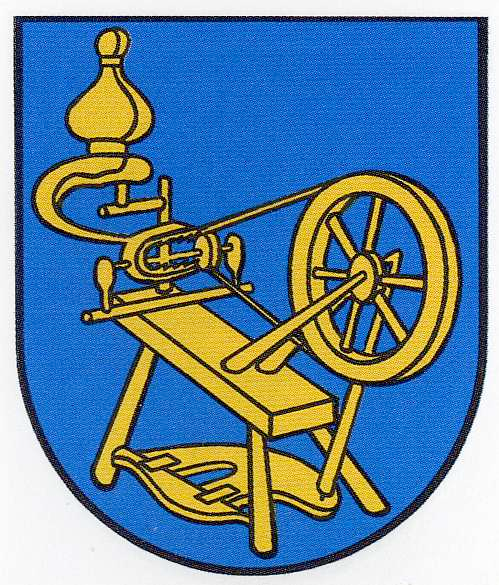
Coat of arms of Watenbüttel
