= Jean-Jacques Reubell =

Jean-Jacques Reubell (Rewbell) (French pronunciation: [ʒɑ̃ ʒak ʁœbɛl]; born August 12, 1777 in Colmar, died 24 January 1847) was a French general during the Napoleonic Wars.

== Life ==
After joining the French army, Reubell was appointed a second lieutenant on 23 April 1792. In 1796 he was already chief of a battalion. In 1807 he joined the service in the Kingdom of Westphalia under Napoleon Bonaparte's brother Jérôme. On 8 December 1807 he became Brigadier General, and, one year later, Major General and Chief of General Staff.

In July 1809, Jérôme ordered Reubell with a Westphalian division to halt the Duke of Brunswick and his corps of Black Brunswickers, who were marching through Westphalia with the intention of joining their British allies on the North Sea coast. Although Reubell successfully repulsed the Brunswickers at the Battle of Ölper just outside the city of Brunswick on 1 August, he unaccountably withdrew that night, allowing the Duke to continue his march. This ineptitude, combined with his mistreatment of Westphalian citizens, led to Jérôme sending another officer to relieve Reubell; however, he was already on his way to the United States with his American wife, Henriette (a daughter of Louis Pascault, Marquis de Poleon). Settling in Baltimore, Reubell set himself up in business, manufacturing white lead and other chemical products.

Reubell was a Knight and Officer of the Legion of Honour and Knight of the Ordre royal et militaire de Saint-Louis.
