= Völkenrode =

Braunschweig-Völkenrode
- Quarter of Braunschweig
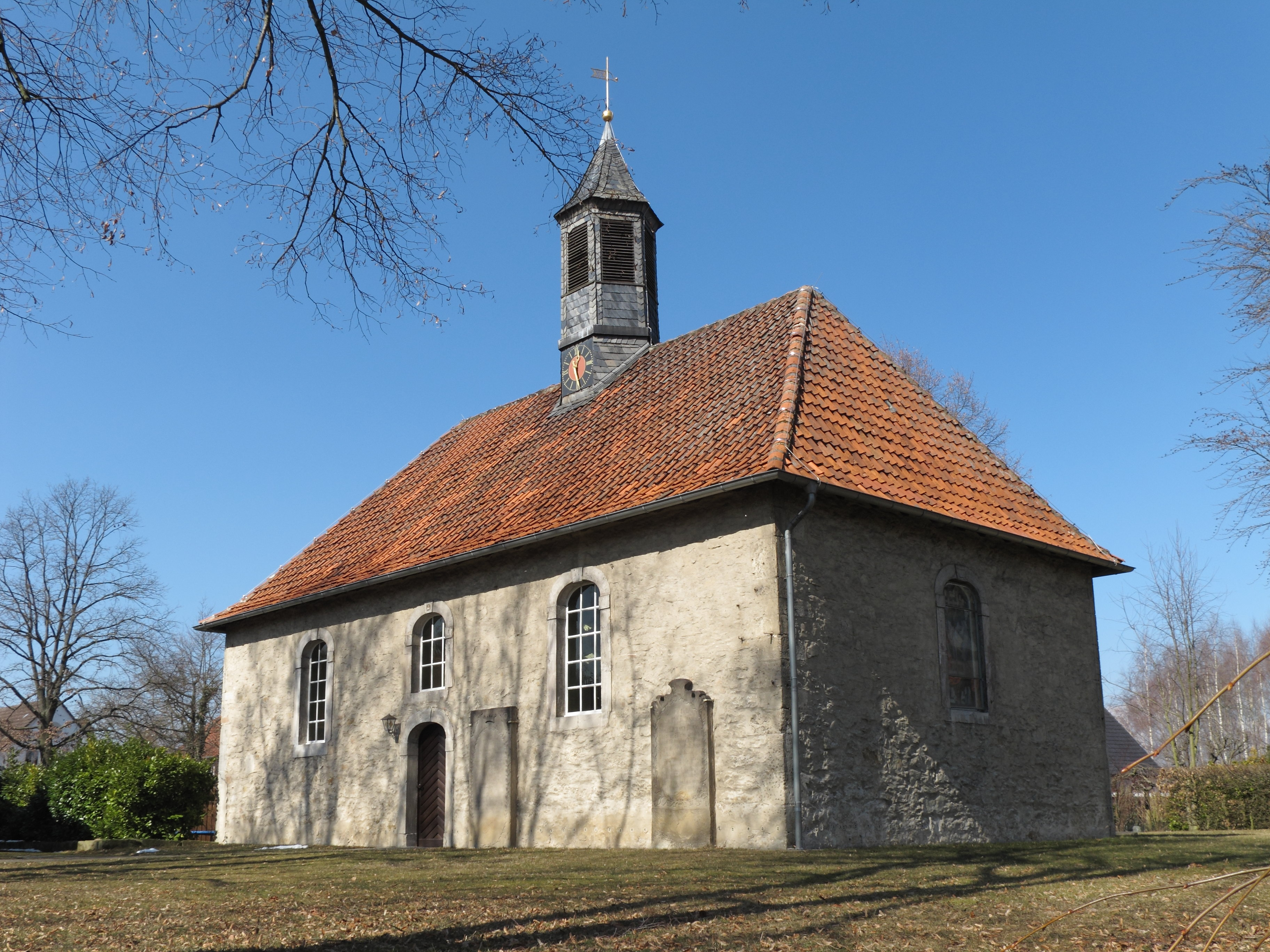
- Church in Völkenrode.

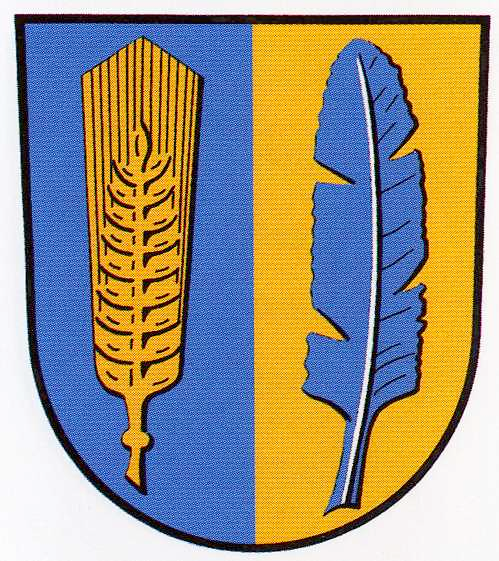
- Coat of arms

- Location of Völkenrode within Braunschweig
- Interactive map of Braunschweig-Völkenrode
- Location within Germany Location within Lower Saxony
- Coordinates: 52°18′17″N 10°26′33″E
- Country: Germany
- State: Lower Saxony
- District: urban district
- City: Braunschweig

Population (2013-12-31)
  - Total: 1,731
- Time zone: UTC+01:00 (CET)
  - Summer (DST): UTC+02:00 (CEST)
- Postal codes: 38112
- Dialling codes: 0531
- Vehicle registration: BS

Völkenrode is a quarter (Stadtteil) of Braunschweig, Lower Saxony, Germany. Formerly a municipality in its own right and part of the district of Braunschweig, it was incorporated into the city of Braunschweig in 1974. Today, it is part of the Stadtbezirk Lehndorf-Watenbüttel.

During the Second World War, it was home to the Luftfahrtforschungsanstalt (Aeronautical Research Institute, LFA), a secret facility for airframe, aeroengine, and aircraft weapons testing.

Völkenrode, and the LFA, were visited postwar by the British Ministry of Aircraft Production survey team, headed by Sir Roy Fedden. Today, the Physikalisch-Technische Bundesanstalt and the former Federal Agricultural Research Centre are located on the former LFA site.
