= Battle of Ölper (1809) =

1809 battle during the War of the Fifth Coalition

- Part of the War of the Fifth Coalition
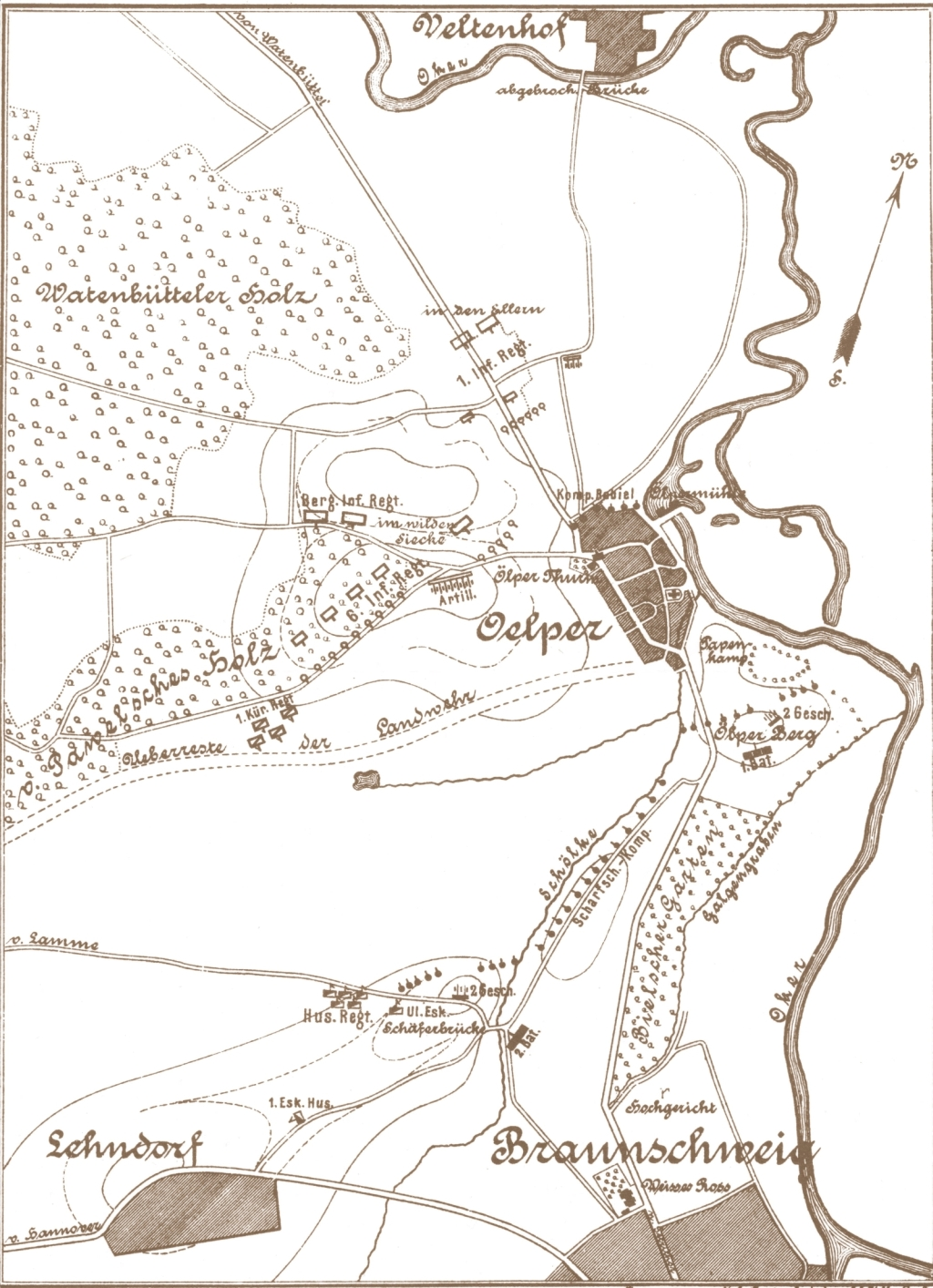
- Map of the battle.
Date	1 August 1809
Location	Ölper, now a district of the city of Braunschweig 52°17′10″N 10°29′48″E
Result	Tactical draw

Belligerents
Black Brunswickers	Kingdom of Westphalia

Commanders and leaders
Frederick William	(Kingdom of Westphalia) Jean-Jacques Reubell

Strength
c. 2,000	c. 5,000

Casualties and losses
40–90	200–500

War of the Fifth Coalition:
Rebellion Brunswick
The color black indicates the current battle.

The Battle of Ölper took place on 1 August 1809 in Ölper, currently a district of the town of Brunswick, as part of the War of the Fifth Coalition. It pitched troops of the Kingdom of Westphalia against the Black Brunswickers under Frederick William, Duke of Brunswick-Wolfenbüttel, but ended in a tactical draw.

== History ==
In the Battle of Jena and Auerstedt, Duke Charles William Ferdinand of Brunswick was mortally wounded. On his deathbed he nominated his son Frederick William as his successor. Although the Duchy of Brunswick-Wolfenbüttel had remained neutral in the conflict against France, Napoleon declared in 1807 that the House of Brunswick had ceased to reign, broke up the duchy and made it a part of the Kingdom of Westphalia, named the Département Oker.

Resisting this, Frederick William, equipped 2,000 troops at his own expense and offered them and his services to Emperor Franz I of Austria in the Convention of Vienna on 25 February 1809. Due to their black uniform these troops were called the Black Brunswickers. After the Battle of Wagram, Austria had made peace with Napoleon, Frederick William decided to pull his troops on their own through northern Germany to embark on the North Sea to England and on the side of England continue to struggle against Napoleon. After defeating a Westphalian infantry regiment at the Battle of Halberstadt on 29 July, the Black Brunswickers and their leader reached Braunschweig on 31 July. The troops were joyfully welcomed by the population, but on the morning following their arrival Frederick William received word that a 5,000-strong Westphalian division commanded by General Reubell was approaching from the north of the city.

== The battle ==
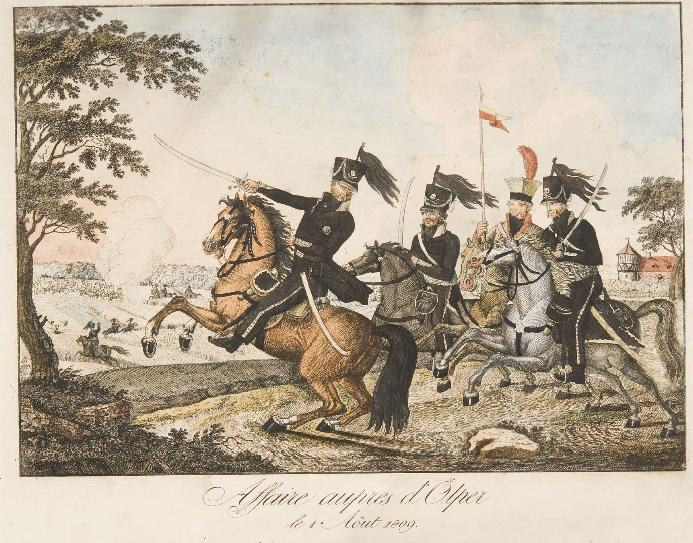
Duke Frederick-William and his staff at the Battle of Ölper.

The Black Brunswickers were outnumbered and were also threatened by an invading Dutch division from Halberstadt. In order not to fall between the two divisions, the Duke decided to face the Westphalians north of Brunswick, near the village of Ölper, to attempt to break through to the north.

At 14:00 the "Black Horde" moved toward Ölper, reinforced by about 200 citizens of Braunschweig, who were equipped with material looted from Halberstadt. Major Korfes destroyed the crossings over the Oker, in order to prevent flank attacks by the enemy.

An hour later, Reubell's troops appeared at Ölper; the lead Westphalian cuirassiers were immediately fired upon and retreated. The First Infantry Regiment of Westphalia now advanced on the village of Ölper. Friedrich Wilhelm left and withdrew his troops to the south and stationed artillery on a hill. From there they could counter the Westphalian infantry attack.

Now Brunswick continued with their Duke at the head of the counter-attack; Friedrich Wilhelm's horse was killed, but he himself remained unhurt. However, Captain von Rabiell, commander of the advancing companies, fell. The Black Brunswickers progressively withdrew, without having recaptured Ölper.

A direct attack on the Westphalians that followed, failed. The bold counterattack against the Hussars under Major Schrader did do damage to them and caused great confusion in the Westphalian ranks.

An artillery battle finally destroyed one of Brunswick's guns, but further attacks never came. Although the Duke was planning a night attack, Reubell had presciently already cleared the village of Ölper.

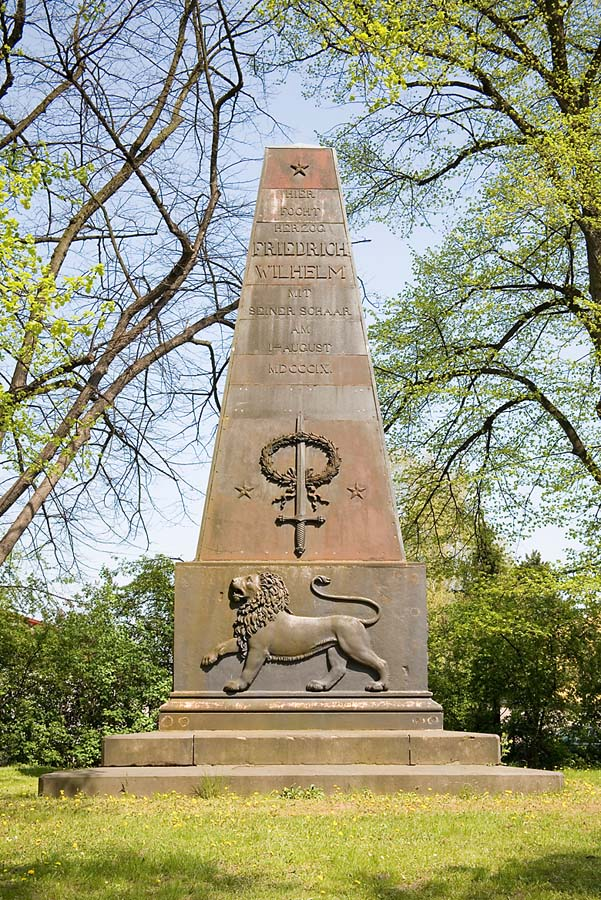
The obelisk commemorating the 1809 Battle of Ölper in the community of Braunschweig-Ölper.

== Losses ==
The casualty figures for the numerically far superior Westphalian troops were estimated to be between 200 and 500 men. Estimates for losses of Black Brunswicker troops vary from 40 (22 dead and 18 missing) and 86 (24 dead and 62 wounded), but these are believed to be understated.

== Results and consequences ==
Although Friedrich Wilhelm is believed to have made some tactical errors in evacuating Ölper and then attempting its recapture, having an insufficient perspective on his overall position and commanding only a small portion of his troops, the Brunswick troops fought bravely against a numerically superior enemy. This was due in part to the greater fighting experience of the Brunswick troops and their high morale, as they had previously defeated a Westphalian Regiment at Halberstadt, but also due to the hesitancy of General Reubell. At the end of the day the Westphalians had taken the battlefield, but they withdrew from Ölper after nightfall and did not defeat the "Black horde", nor stop their further movement to the North Sea. On 2 August the Brunswick Corps broke through and marched on through Celle, Hanover, Nienburg and Delmas, while pursued by Reubell's troops. On 7 August they reached Elsfleth, from which they were shipped to Helgoland and later to the Isle of Wight. Duke Friedrich Wilhelm's troops entered British service, and they fought from 1810 to 1814 under the command of Wellington in the Peninsular War. General Reubell was dismissed from his post by Napoleon because of his failure, but fled to America before he could be brought to justice.

In 1824 and 1833 Duke Charles II and Duke William, sons of the Black Duke, donated a Cross of Honor for 1809, which they awarded to the participants.

== Notes ==
Preceded by Walcheren Campaign	Napoleonic Wars; Battle of Ölper (1809)	Succeeded by Battle of Almonacid
