= Frederick William, Duke of Brunswick-Wolfenbüttel =

Frederick William
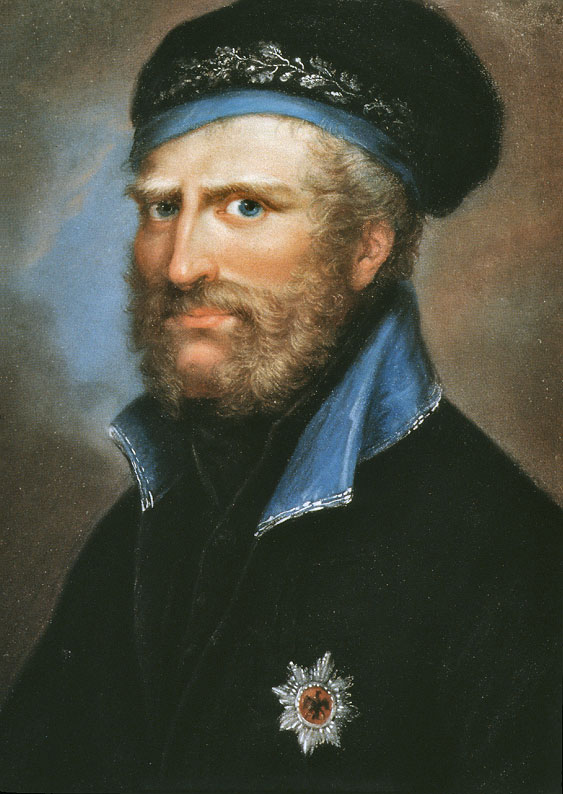
- Portrait by Johann Christian August Schwartz, 1809

Duke of Brunswick-Lüneburg Prince of Brunswick-Wolfenbüttel
- Reign: 16 October 1806 – 8 July 1807
- Predecessor: Charles William Ferdinand

Duke of Brunswick
- Reign: 26 October 1813 – 16 June 1815
- Successor: Charles II
- Born: 9 October 1771; Brunswick, Brunswick-Wolfenbüttel (now Brunswick, Germany)
- Died: 16 June 1815 (aged 43); Quatre Bras, Netherlands (now Genappe, Belgium)
- Spouse: Princess Marie of Baden (m. 1802; died 1808)
- Issue More...: Charles II, Duke of Brunswick; William, Duke of Brunswick
- House: Brunswick-Bevern
- Father: Charles William Ferdinand, Duke of Brunswick
- Mother: Princess Augusta of Great Britain

Frederick William, Duke of Brunswick-Wolfenbüttel (German: Friedrich Wilhelm; 9 October 1771 – 16 June 1815), was a German prince and Duke of Brunswick-Lüneburg and Oels. Nicknamed "The Black Duke", he was a military officer who led the Black Brunswickers against French domination in Germany. He briefly ruled the state of Brunswick-Wolfenbüttel from 1806 to 1807 and again from 1813 to 1815. He was killed during the Battle of Quatre Bras, during the Waterloo campaign.

== Life ==
Prince Frederick William of Brunswick-Wolfenbüttel was born in Braunschweig as the fourth son of Charles William Ferdinand, Duke of Brunswick-Lüneburg (on the latter's 36th birthday), and Princess Augusta of Great Britain. He was the first cousin and brother-in-law (from 8 April 1795) of his friend George IV, Prince Regent of the United Kingdom (from 1811).

He joined the Prussian army in 1789 as a captain and participated in battles against Revolutionary France. In 1805, after his uncle, Frederick Augustus, Duke of Oels, had died childless, Frederick William inherited the Duchy of Oels, a small mediatized principality in Silesia subordinate to the King of Prussia.

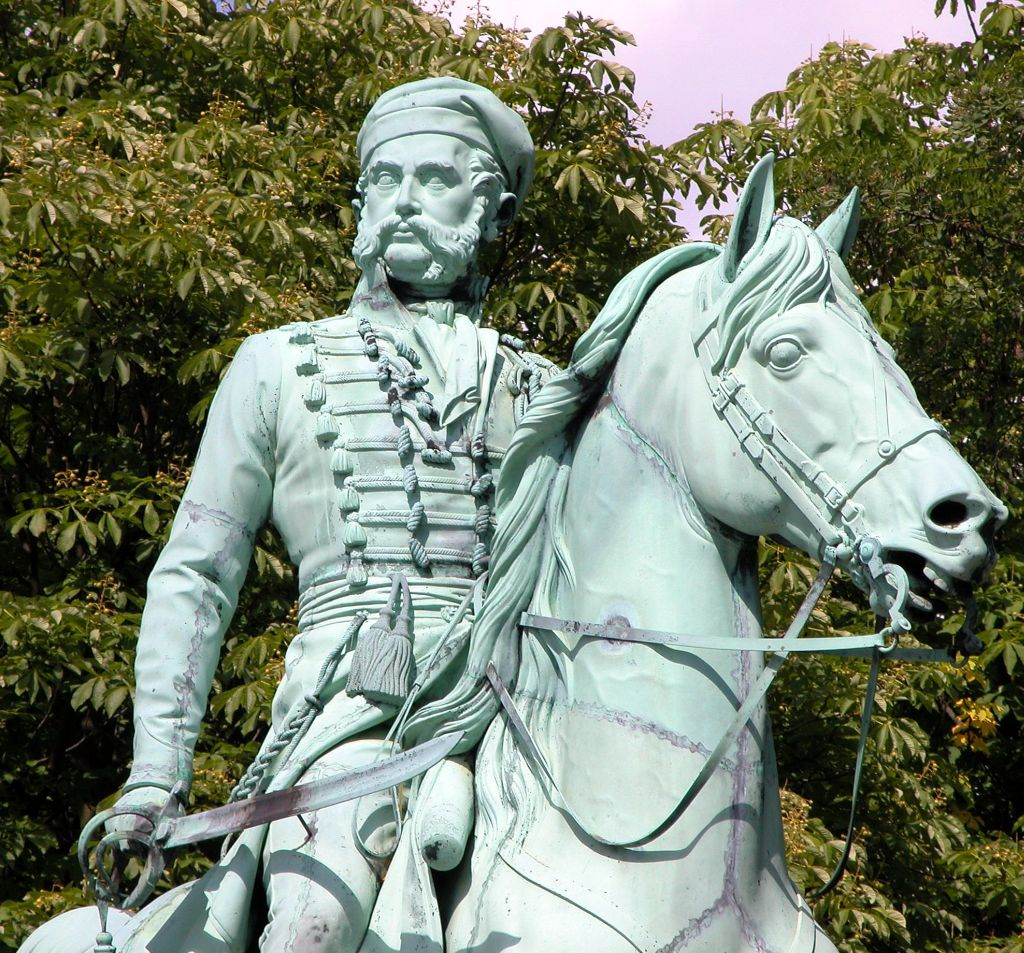
Statue of Frederick William at Braunschweig, by Ernst Julius Hähnel

In October 1806, Frederick William participated in the Battle of Jena-Auerstädt as a major general of the Prussian army, of which his father was the field marshal. His father died from a wound he received in this battle, and Frederick William inherited Brunswick-Wolfenbüttel, since his eldest brother had died childless two months earlier, and both the second and third brother had intellectual disabilities. After the defeat of Prussia in the Fourth Coalition, his state remained under the control of France, however, and was formally made a part of the short-lived Napoleonic Kingdom of Westphalia in 1807. Frederick William fled to his parents-in-law in Bruchsal in the Grand Duchy of Baden, which had remained a sovereign state with the dissolution of the Holy Roman Empire in 1806 by Francis II, where he lived for the next few years.

=== The Black Brunswickers ===
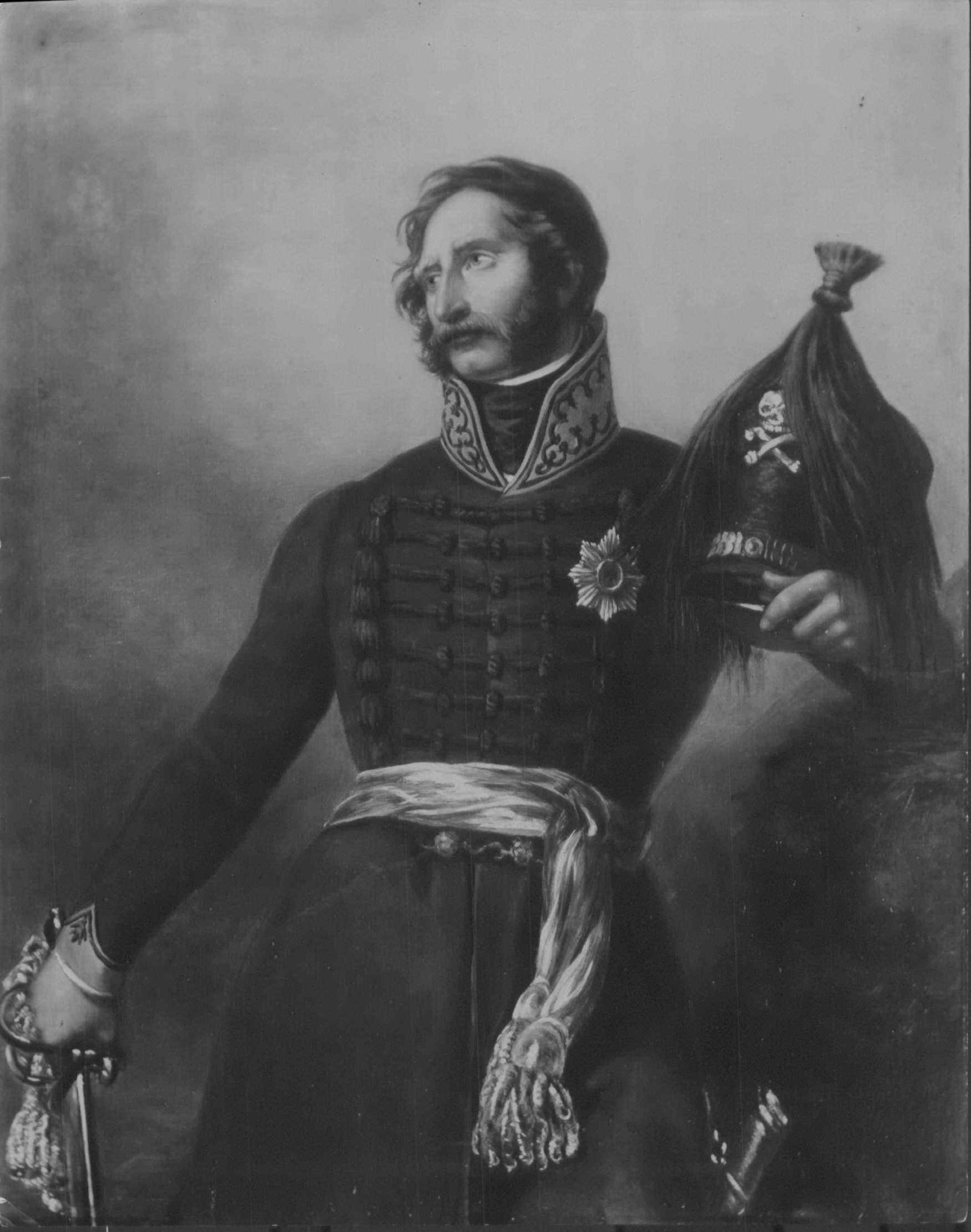
William Corden the Younger (1819-1900) - Frederick William, Duke of Brunswick and Wolfenbüttel (1771-1815)

When the War of the Fifth Coalition broke out in 1809, Frederick William used this opportunity to create a corps of partisans with the support of the Austrian Empire. This corps was called the Black Brunswickers because they wore black uniforms in mourning for their occupied country. He financed the corps independently by mortgaging his principality in Oels, and made his way from Austrian Bohemia through the French-allied states of Saxony and Westphalia to the North Sea coast.

He was shocked by the armistice of Znaim signed on 12 July 1809 and decided to fight on. He and his corps began their remarkable fighting march towards the north German coast at Zwickau on 24 July. Entering the town of Halle in Westphalia on 26 July, the duke appropriated its civic funds. This prompted Jérôme Bonaparte, King of Westphalia, to order three generals, Jean-Jacques Reubell, Pierre Guillaume Gratien and Claude Ignace François Michaud, to gather their forces and destroy the Brunswickers. However, the Brunswickers surprised the Westphalians by a rapid advance and defeated them in the battle of Halberstadt on 29 and 30 July 1809. After reinforcing his troops from captured stocks and men, Frederick William pushed on to his former capital Braunschweig, which he reached on the evening of 31st July. Then he decided to go on to the coast. Although his path was successfully blocked by Reubell outside Brunswick at the battle of Ölper on 1 August, the Westphalians gave away their advantage by withdrawing under cover of darkness and allowing the Black Brunswickers to continue their march northward to Elsfleth, where they embarked on British ships, which took them to the Isle of Wight.

Upon arrival in Britain the troops of Frederick William were taken into British pay and the Duke was granted the rank of lieutenant general in the British Army. His corps of originally 2,300 soldiers was severely depleted in battles in Spain and Portugal during the Peninsular War. Renamed the Brunswick Oels Jäger and Brunswick Oels Hussar Regiments, they fought at Fuentes de Oñoro, Salamanca, Vitoria, the Pyrenees, Nivelle, the Nive, and Orthez.

=== Exile in Britain ===
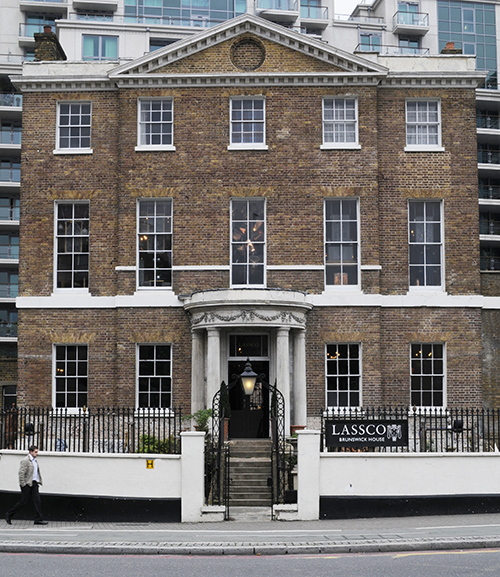
Belmont House (now Brunswick House) Vauxhall, home of the Duke of Brunswick in London.

As the son of King George III's sister, Princess Augusta, Duchess of Brunswick, and brother of Caroline, Princess of Wales, Frederick William was intimately related to the British royal family. After departing the continent he settled in London between 1810 and 1813 where he set up his court-in-exile at Belmont House (later renamed as Brunswick House) in Vauxhall, just over the River Thames from St James's Palace. During his time in London he became famed at court for his taciturn and misanthropic disposition. He was a frequent visitor to St James's palace where he became a confirmed favourite of the Prince of Wales and Chesterfield House in Greenwich, where his mother the Dowager Duchess of Brunswick had taken up residence in exile. Curiously, during his time in London the Duke was credited, by Lord Albemarle, with having contributed to the introduction of the moustache into Georgian Britain.

=== Return to Brunswick and Quatre Bras ===
Upon the declaration of the German War of Liberation in 1813, Frederick William resolved the depart London for his Duchy, alone, in an attempt to initiate an uprising there. Despite a lack of material support from the British he resolved to 'go straight to Hamburgh. I hear there are some brave young men there who await my coming... I will go without money or arms and gain both'.

Returning to Braunschweig in December 1813, after Prussia had ended French domination in Braunschweig-Lüneburg, he quickly reconstituted his authority and raised new troops. When Napoleon returned to the political scene in 1815 during the Hundred Days, Frederick William raised fresh troops. He was killed by a gunshot at the Battle of Quatre Bras on 16 June, the night after he had attended the Duchess of Richmond's ball in Brussels and left it happy to have a chance to show his fighting ability.

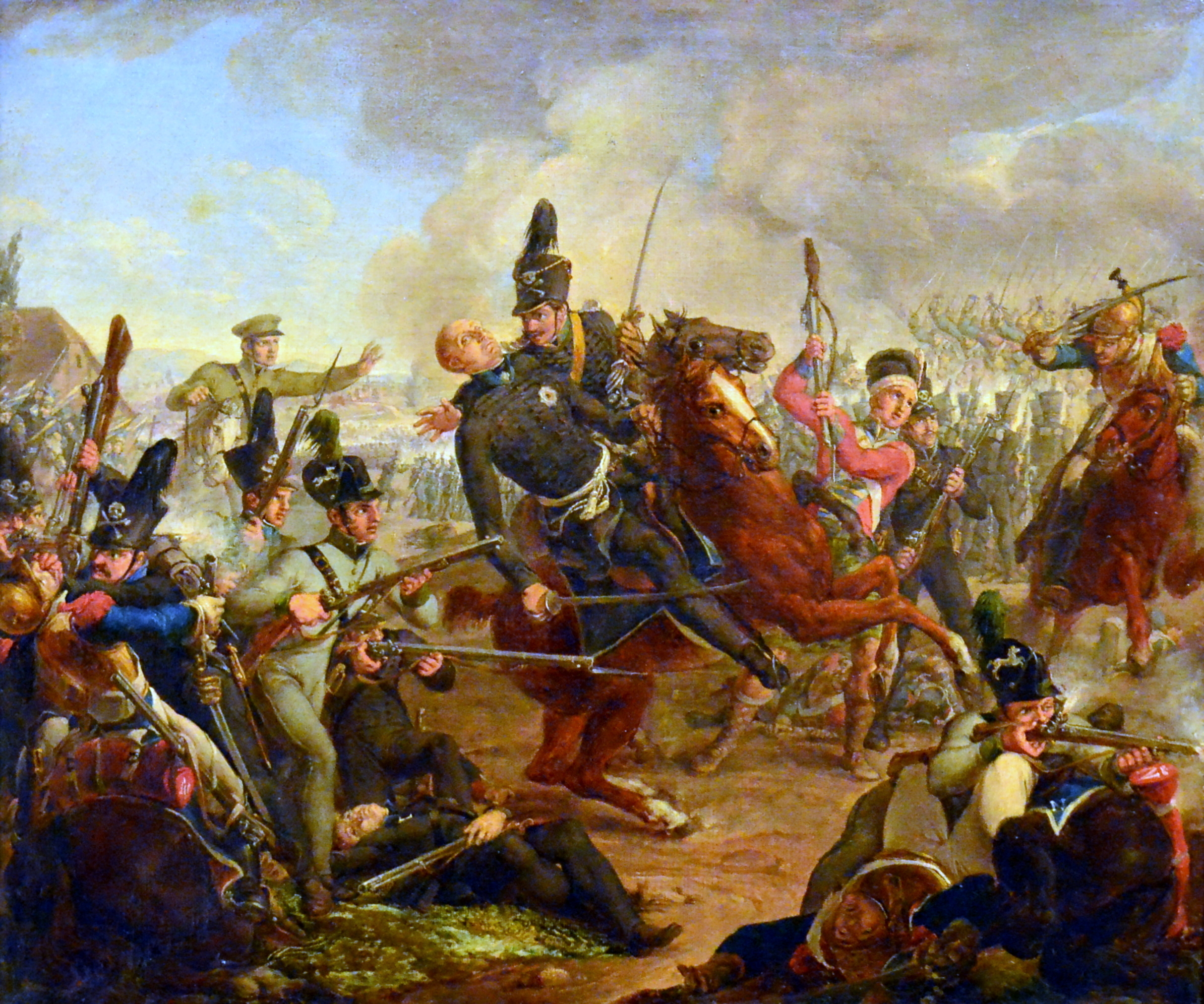
1835 painting of the Duke's death at the Battle of Quatre Bras

The Duke fell at the head of his men, fighting alongside the Gordon Highlanders and holding the crucial crossroads at Quatre Bras.

The action that led to his death was described thus by an eyewitness:

"Duke Friedrich Wilhelm, who had ridden ahead, returned to our ranks and while smoking a short pipe, said: ‘Children, let us charge the weapons quickly!’ The first thing we saw as we came into the field of action was a regiment of Belgian Dragoons in the greatest disorder, who were retiring very hastily before the French! Now we knew that the war had begun, and advancing with the greatest courage we exchanged blows with the enemy....

The death of our beloved Duke was only confirmed the following day, although he had fallen close to our battalion (he had lost his horse before this and I had almost been ridden over by the horse he had received as a substitute). I had seen him on several occasions during the action, as he waited on our left flank with the Hussars. But we were no longer to witness his encouraging presence! The impression this loss had on our Brunswick legions was not as it was subsequently described. Each of us, be he an officer or a simple soldier, had enough to concern himself with, and we were unable to dwell upon this tragic event for any length of time, only the memory of our beloved Duke, Friedrich Wilhelm."

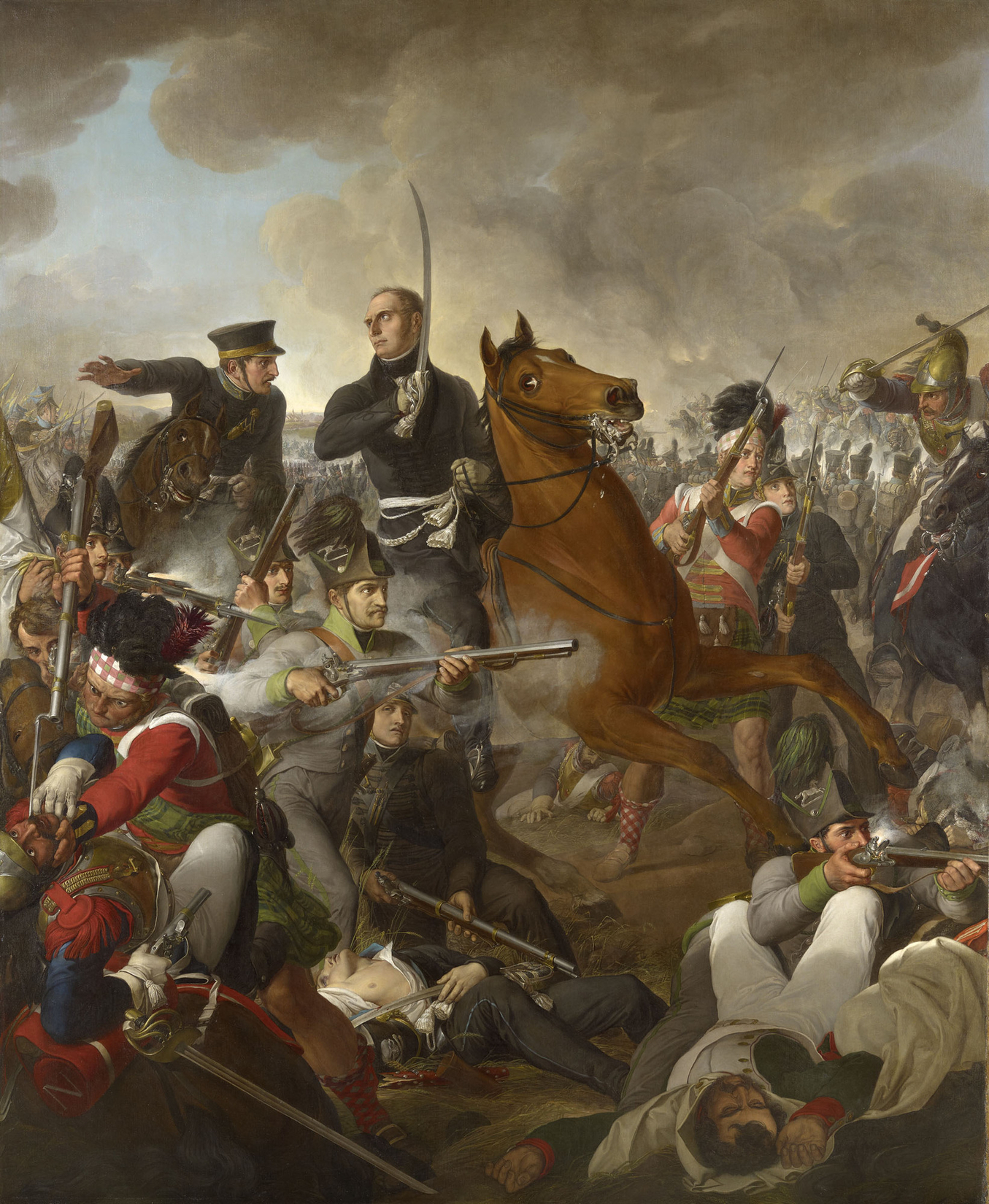
Johann Friedrich Matthäi (1777-1845) - The Death of Frederick William, Duke of Brunswick-Wolfenbüttel at the Battle of Quatre Bras

- Friedrich Cappel officer in the Brunswick Leib Battalion at Quatre Bras.

The manner of his death was described thus:

"Our Duke was killed by a ball which passed through his hand and his body. He was said to have been very angry, and was one of the foremost in the battle."

- Wilhelm Schütte, Surgeon with the Brunswick Corps, Quatre Bras.

Despite the death of the Duke the Brunswickers continued to serve in the allied forces, gaining distinction for their actions in the victory at Waterloo, two days later.

Duke Frederick William's body was returned to Brunswick where he lies buried and memorialised in Brunswick cathedral.

== Family ==
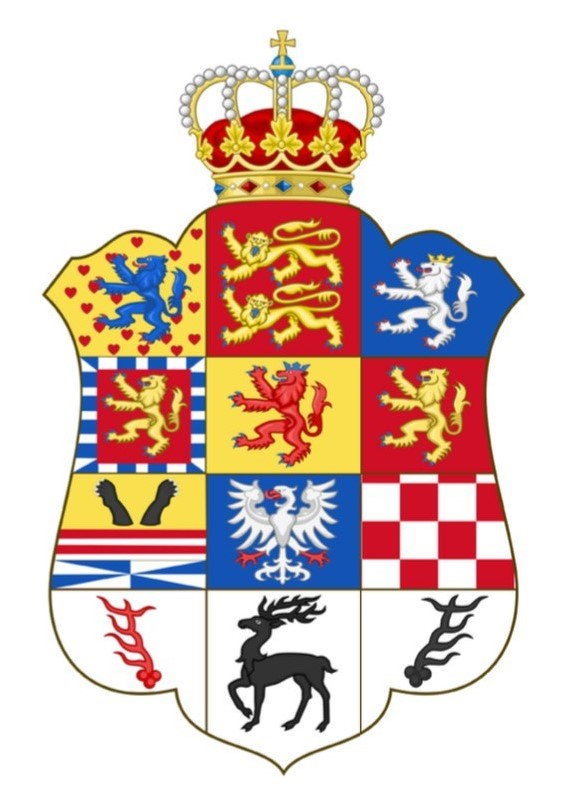
Arms of Frederick William, Duke of Brunswick-Wolfenbüttel

On 1 November 1802, in Karlsruhe, Frederick William married Princess Marie Elisabeth of Baden (7 September 1782 Karlsruhe – 20 April 1808 Bruchsal), daughter of Charles Louis, Hereditary Prince of Baden. The couple had three children before Marie died of puerperal fever four days after giving birth to a stillborn daughter.

- Charles (30 October 1804 – 18 August 1873)
- William (25 April 1806 – 18 October 1884)
- Stillborn daughter (b. & d. 16 April 1808 Bruchsal)

== Monuments ==
- Tomb in the crypt of Brunswick Cathedral
- Brunswick Monument at Quatre Bras, (Genappe, Belgium) erected by the Brunswick State for the 75th anniversary. The bronze lion was cast in the Wilhelm foundry in Bornum
- An 1874 pair of equestrian statues of the Black Duke and his father are outside the Schloss-Arkaden (Brunswick Palace), Braunschweig. They were restored in 1973.
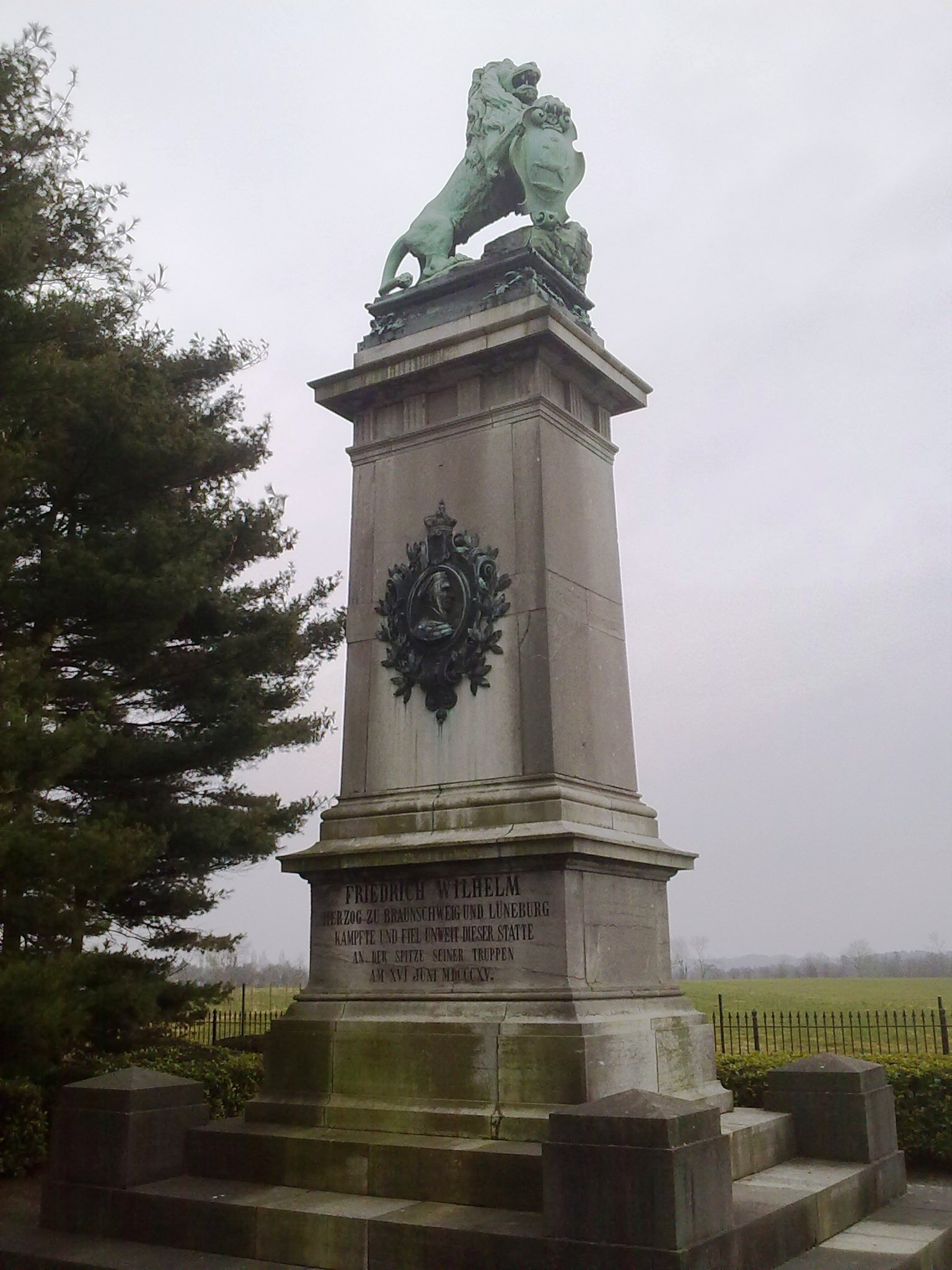
Brunswick Monument in Baisy-Thy. The German caption reads : Frederick-William Duke of Brunswick and Luneburg fought ahead of his troops and fell not far from this place on 16 June 1815.

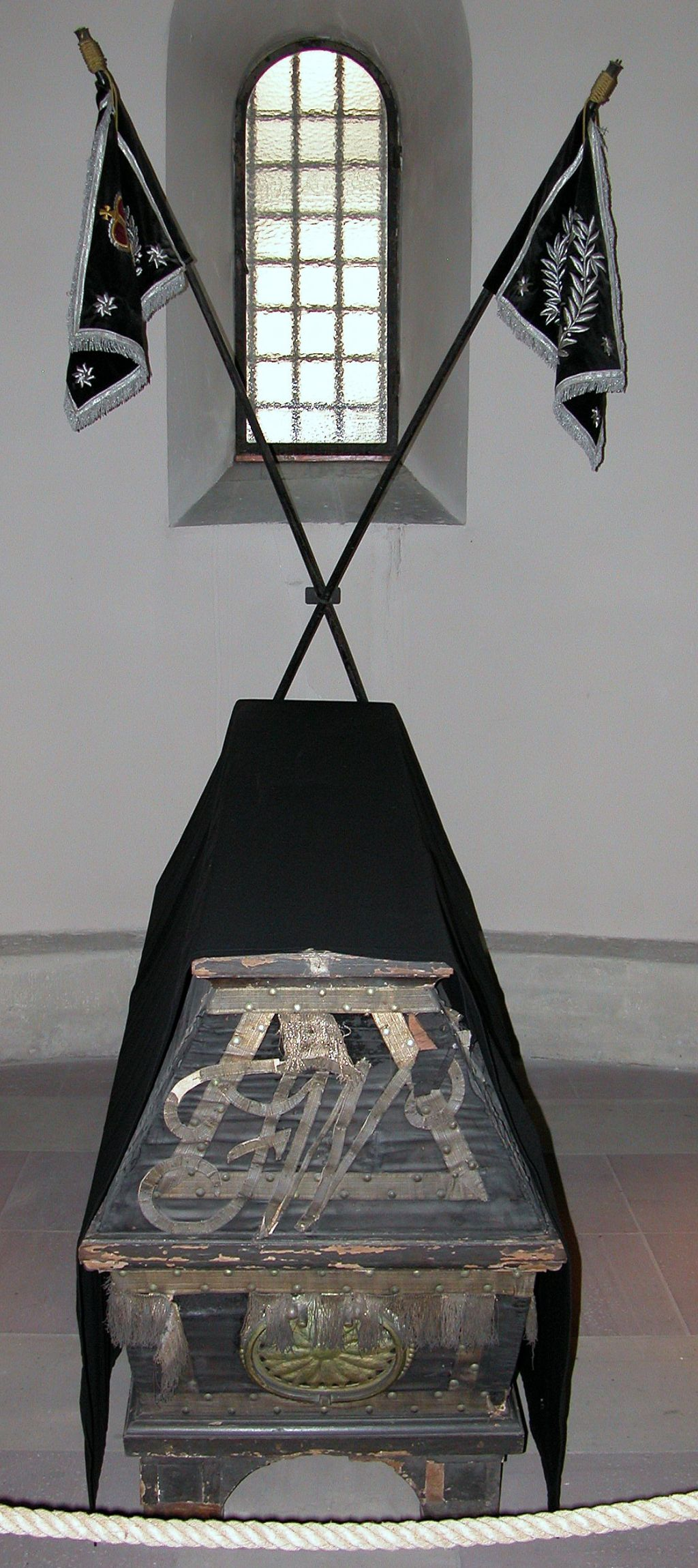
Tomb of Frederick William, in the crypt of Brunswick Cathedral

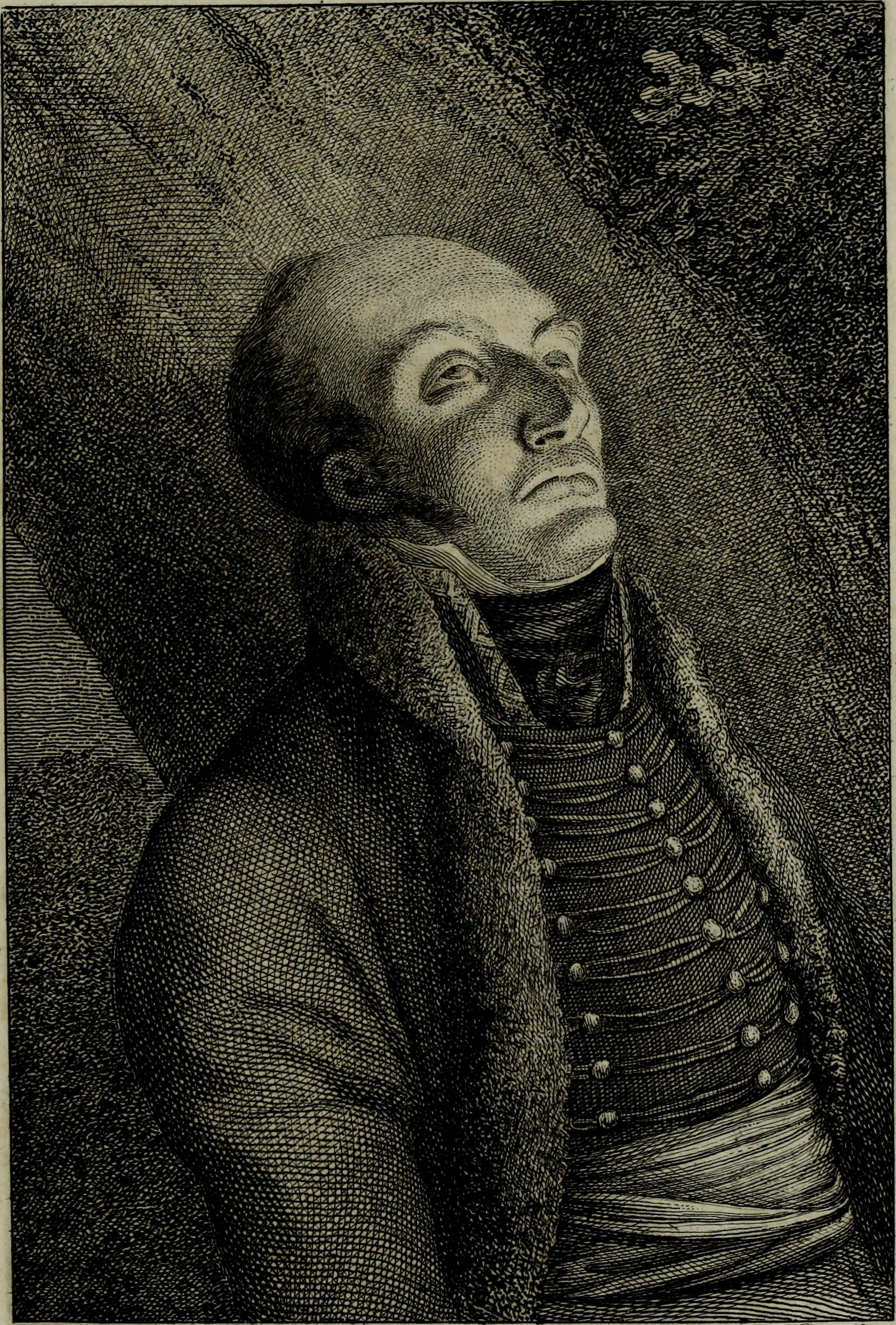
Frederick William, Duke of Brunswick-Wolfenbüttel depicted in Gedenkzuil van den Nederlandschen Krijgsroem in Junij MDCCCXV (1816) by Jan Scharp

== Ancestors ==
Ancestors of Frederick William, Duke of Brunswick-Wolfenbüttel

16. Ferdinand Albert I, Duke of Brunswick-Lüneburg
8. Ferdinand Albert II, Duke of Brunswick-Lüneburg
17. Landgravine Christina Wilhelmina of Hesse-Eschwege
4. Charles I, Duke of Brunswick-Wolfenbüttel
18. Louis Rudolph, Duke of Brunswick-Lüneburg
9. Duchess Antoinette Amalie of Brunswick-Lüneburg
19. Princess Christine Louise of Oettingen-Oettingen
2. Charles William Ferdinand, Duke of Brunswick
20. Frederick I of Prussia
10. Frederick William I of Prussia
21. Sophia Charlotte of Hanover
5. Princess Philippine Charlotte of Prussia
22. George I of Great Britain
11. Sophia Dorothea of Hanover
23. Sophia Dorothea of Celle
1. Frederick William, Duke of Brunswick-Wolfenbüttel
24. George I of Great Britain (= 22)
12. George II of Great Britain
25. Sophia Dorothea of Celle (= 23)
6. Frederick, Prince of Wales
26. John Frederick, Margrave of Brandenburg-Ansbach
13. Caroline of Ansbach
27. Princess Eleonore Erdmuthe of Saxe-Eisenach
3. Princess Augusta of Great Britain
28. Frederick I, Duke of Saxe-Gotha-Altenburg
14. Frederick II, Duke of Saxe-Gotha-Altenburg
29. Princess Magdalena Sibylle of Saxe-Weissenfels
7. Princess Augusta of Saxe-Gotha
30. Karl, Prince of Anhalt-Zerbst
15. Princess Magdalena Augusta of Anhalt-Zerbst
31. Duchess Sophia of Saxe-Weissenfels

Frederick William, Duke of Brunswick-Wolfenbüttel House of Brunswick-Bevern Cadet branch of the House of Welf Born: 9 October 1771 Died: 16 June 1815
Regnal titles
Preceded by Charles William Ferdinand	Duke of Brunswick-Lüneburg; Prince of Brunswick-Wolfenbüttel; 1806–1807	Succeeded by Duchy conquered by France and annexed to Westphalia
Preceded by Duchy established	Duke of Brunswick; 1813–1815	Succeeded by Charles II
