= Battle of Ölper (1761) =

1761 battle of the Seven Years' War

- Part of the Seven Years' War
Date	13–14 October 1761
Location	Ölper, Principality of Brunswick-Wolfenbüttel
Result	Brunswick victory

Belligerents
Brunswick-Wolfenbüttel	France; Saxony

Commanders and leaders
Frederick Augustus, Prince of Brunswick-Wolfenbüttel-Oels	Marquis de Vastan

Strength
Unknown	c. 1,700

Casualties and losses
4 officers and 145 NCOs and other ranks	52 officers and 430 NCOs and other ranks (captured)

The Battle of Ölper was a battle at Ölper, now a district of Brunswick, on 13 October 1761. It occurred between a Franco-Saxon force and a Brunswick-Hanoverian force, lasted long into the night and ended in a Brunswickian victory. It was part of the Seven Years' War.

== Background ==
On 8 October 1761, Prince Francis Xavier of Saxony attacked Wolfenbüttel with a Saxon-French corps, which surrendered two days later. Then Xavier's army turned against Braunschweig and on 13 October began a siege of the city. In the city there were approximately 2000 men under the command of the Lieutenant General von Imhoff firmly determined to defend them. The besiegers, in turn, prepared to storm the city. The Brunswick Prince Friedrich had left Hanover two days earlier with an army in the direction of Braunschweig.

== Battle ==
Prince Friedrich was well informed by scouts about the enemy troop line-up. The majority of the French-Saxon besiegers were camped near Riddagshausen and Broitzem, and strong artillery was positioned on the Nussberg. With Ölper, a detachment for protection against detachment of approximately 1,700 men set up. Friedrich's army left from Abbensen at around 1:00 p.m. and marched towards Ölper. Prince Friedrich had Imhoff notified of the upcoming reinforcement. At Wendezelle, which had been reached long after nightbreak, an enemy patrol was attacked, but shortly before Ölper, Prince Friedrich's vanguard got into a battle with a field guard; the besiegers were warned by the shooting. In this skirmish, the Brunswick Major General von Rothenburg fell.

Prince Friedrich ordered his men to occupy the bridge between Ölper and Braunschweig, and while the French-Saxon troops were also attacked on the left flank by a Brunswick division, the main army with Prince Friedrich at the head moved directly through the village and the surrounding hop gardens towards the enemy. The artillery that the Brunswick army had shelled since the alert was captured, the besiegers fled or went into captivity.

Prince Friedrich moved into the city of Braunschweig with cheers. The next day, the siege army of Prince Xavier withdrew to Wolfenbüttel. The Brunswick troops lost about 150 men in this battle, it is reported on the French-Saxon side that the victims were higher, and 482 men were captured.
