= Elsfleth =

- Town
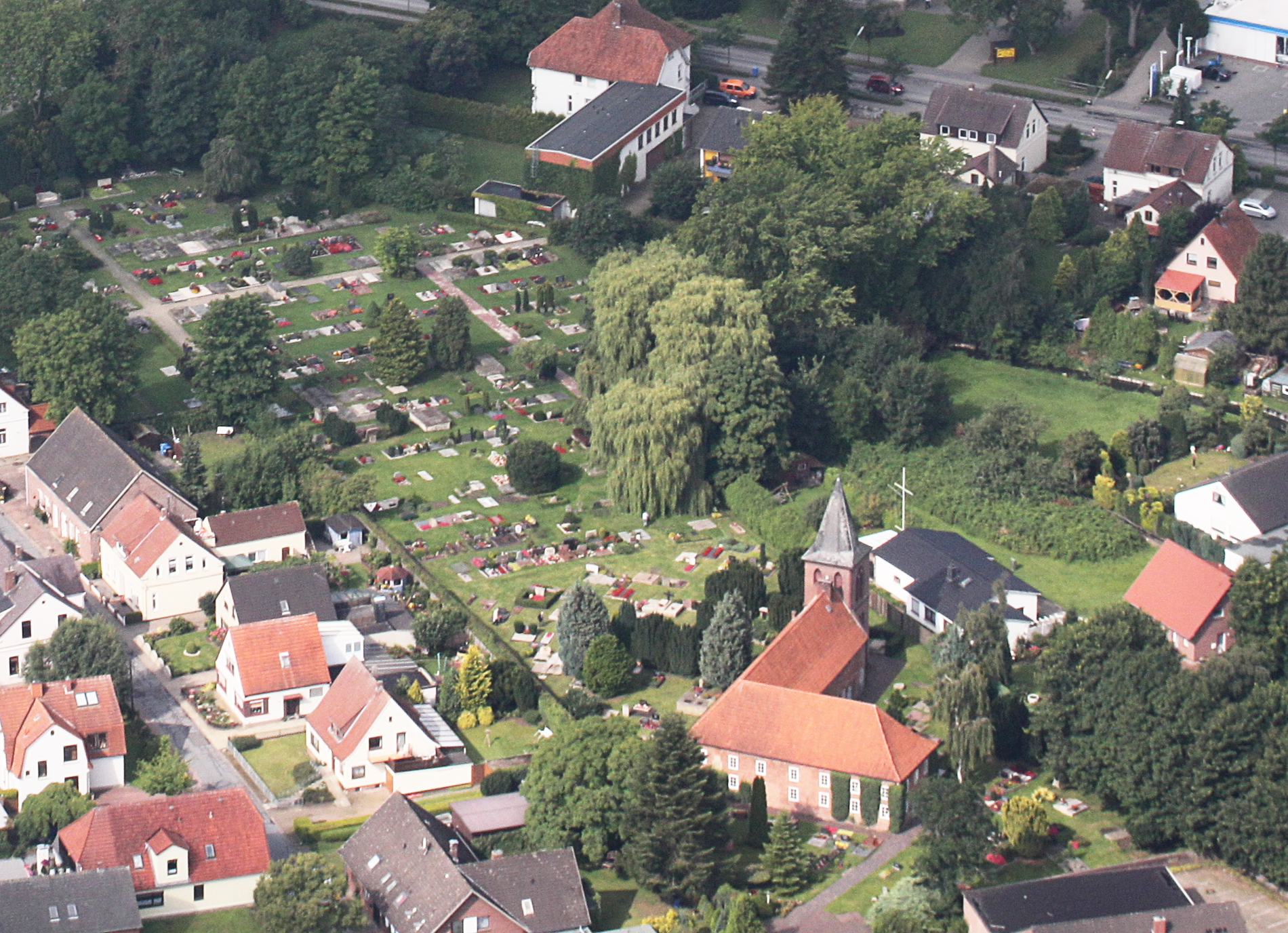

- Coat of arms

- Location of Elsfleth within Wesermarsch district
- Interactive map of Elsfleth
- Location within Germany Location within Lower Saxony
- Coordinates: 53°14′N 8°28′E
- Country: Germany
- State: Lower Saxony
- District: Wesermarsch

Government
  - Mayor (2021–26): Brigitte Fuchs

Area
  - Total: 115.19 km^{2} (44.48 sq mi)
- Elevation: 3 m (9.8 ft)

Population (2025-12-31)
  - Total: 8,921
  - Density: 77.45/km^{2} (200.6/sq mi)
- Time zone: UTC+01:00 (CET)
  - Summer (DST): UTC+02:00 (CEST)
- Postal codes: 26931
- Dialling codes: 04404
- Vehicle registration: BRA
- Website: www.elsfleth.de

Elsfleth (German pronunciation: [ˈɛlsˌfleːt]) is a town in the district of Wesermarsch, Lower Saxony, Germany. It is situated at the confluence of the Hunte with the Weser, on the left bank of the Weser. It has a school of navigation (university of applied sciences), a harbour and docks.

Elsfleth offers many recreational facilities even though it is a small town,. It is an ideal place for families that want to escape big cities and like outdoor activities that are not only limited to tennis and biking. A nearby beach area and sailing club "SWE" contribute to Elsfleth's maritime character. So does the tall ship club Großherzogin Elisabeth amicably called "Lissi". Nearby larger cities are Brake, Nordenham, Oldenburg, and Bremen.

== Sons and daughters of the city ==
- Friedrich Bolte (1860–1940), Director of the Hamburg Navigation School
- Karl Schröder (1890–1966), tax consultant and politician (SPD)
- Erich Zander (1906–1985), jurist, politician (CDU)
- Horst Karsten (born 1936), versatility rider, Olympic medal winner

== Connected to Elsfleth ==
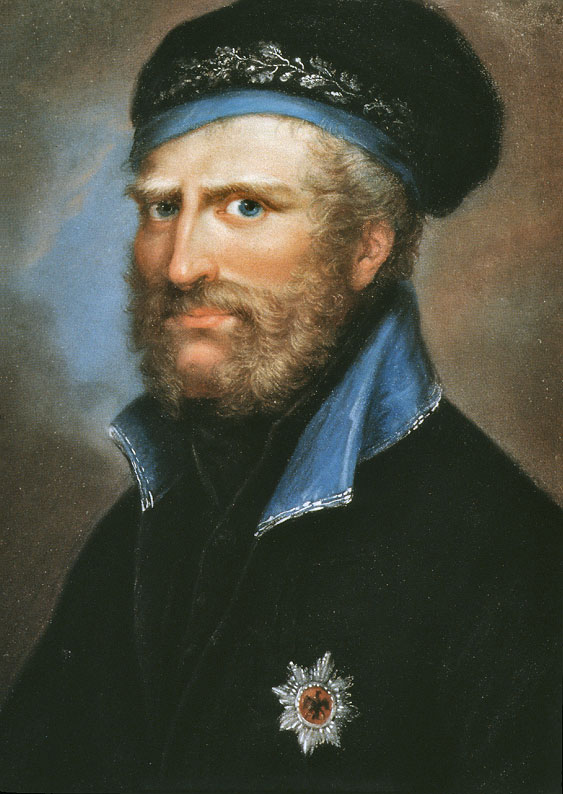
Frederick William, Duke of Brunswick-Wolfenbüttel 1801

- Anthony Günther, Count of Oldenburg (1583–1667) introduced the Elsfleth Weser toll
- Frederick William, Duke of Brunswick-Wolfenbüttel (1771–1815);
- Wilhelm von Freeden (1822–1894), mathematician, natural scientist, oceanographer
- Heinrich Emil Timerding (1873–1945), mathematician, was professor at the sea school in Elsfleth around 1900
- Bernhard Müller (1887–1970), politician (SPD), lived in Elsfleth

== Locations ==
- Huntorf power station, a compressed-air energy storage facility, is located in Elsfleth.
- Omni-Pac, an egg carton manufacturer is located in Elsfleth.
- BBS Wesermarsch, vocational school focused on social-pedagogy.
- Oberschule Elsfleth, comprehensive secondary school.
- Grundschule Elsfleth, elementary school.

== History ==
Elsfleth was indirectly affected by the political and economic policies of Napoleon Bonaparte during the Napoleonic era. The town, located in northern Germany, was influenced by the Continental System (1806–1814), which aimed to weaken British trade by restricting commerce in European ports, including smaller North Sea and Weser River harbors such as Elsfleth. However, there is no historical evidence that Napoleon ever visited or directly governed the town.

== Literature ==
- "Tödliches Tohuwabohu" — Thomas Schröder
- "Elsfleth – Das ist unsere Stadt!" — Students of the local "Oberschule"
- "Elsfleth: Stadt und Hafen an der Weser" — Adolf Blumenberg
- “Tödlicher Tüddelkram” — Thomas Schröder
