= Wild Roses (film) =

- Film poster
- Directed by: Anna Jadowska
- Written by: Anna Jadowska
- Produced by: Izabela Igel, Roman Jarosz
- Starring: Marta Nieradkiewicz, Michał Żurawski, Halina Rasiakówna, Konrad Skolimowski, Natalia Bartnik
- Cinematography: Małgorzata Szyłak
- Edited by: Anna Mass
- Music by: Agnieszka Stulgińska
- Production companies: Alter Ego Pictures, Canal+ Poland, Polish Film Institute
- Distributed by: Alter Ego Pictures
- Release date: 29 December 2017 (Poland)
- Running time: 93 minutes
- Country: Poland
- Language: Polish

Wild Roses (Polish: Dzikie róże) is a 2017 Polish drama and thriller film directed by Anna Jadowska. The film is set in Oleśnica, Poland.

== Plot ==
Ewa, the film's chief protagonist played by Marta Nieradkiewicz, is a thirty-year-old mother with two children. Her mother (Halina Rasiakówna) is devoted to helping her daughter's caretaking of children. Ewa's husband (Michał Żurawski) works abroad, so that the family can complete the construction of their family home. The movie's dilemma centres around the fragile nature of their long-distance relationship, evidently as the film reaches its disastrous climacteric.

== Cast ==
- Marta Nieradkiewicz as Ewa
- Michał Żurawski as Andrzej
- Halina Rasiakówna as Ewa's mother
- Konrad Skolimowski as Marcel
- Natalia Bartnik as Marysia
- Dominik Weslig as Jaś
- Dominika Biernat as Basia
