= Bartosz Gelner =

Polish actor (born 1988)

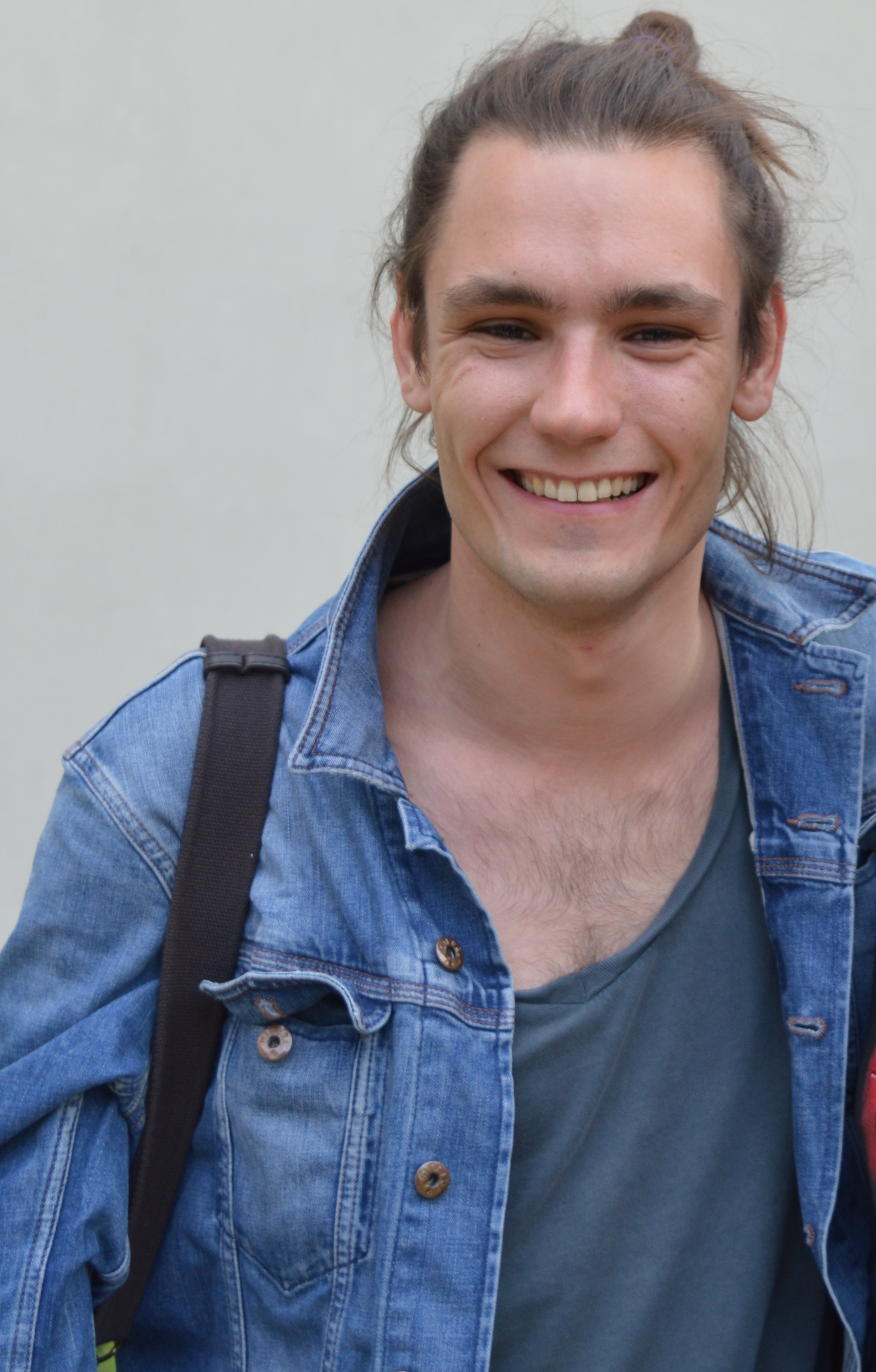
- Gelner in 2015
- Born: 25 April 1988 (age 37); Katowice, Poland
- Education: AST National Academy of Theatre Arts
- Occupation: Actor
- Years active: 2008–present

Bartosz Gelner (born 25 April 1988) is a Polish actor. He is known for his roles in the films Suicide Room (2011) and Floating Skyscrapers (2013), as well as the television series Ultraviolet (2017–2019) and Sexify (2021–23).

== Biography ==
Gelner was born in Katowice and attended high school in Chorzów. His mother is a doctor and his father is an engineer. He has a younger sister, Hania. Regarding his childhood in Silesia, Gelner stated, "Silesia and its people shaped me. I really like the energy there, the people and their kindness. My adolescence was pleasant and creative." He attended the AST National Academy of Theatre Arts in Kraków.

== Filmography ==
=== Film ===
Year	Title	Role	Ref.
2011	Suicide Room	Aleksander Lubomirski	
2013	Floating Skyscrapers	Michał	
2017	Satan Said Dance	Boy kissing Karolina	
2017	Chain Reaction	Paweł	
2018	Kobieta sukcesu	Piotr	
2019	Powrót	Lech	
2019	Legions	Tadeusz Zbarski	
2023	Pokolenie Ikea	Piotr	
2024	Kulej. Dwie strony medalu	Wituś Kowalski	

=== Television ===
Year	Title	Role	Notes	Ref.
2009	Przystań	Olaf Kozlowski	13 episodes	
2010	Ratownicy	Gąsior	2 episodes	
2011	Days of Honor	Alan Krawczyk	10 episodes	
2012	Komisarz Alex	Tomasz Wolski	1 episode	
2012	True Law	Robert	1 episode	
2012–2016	Barwy szczęścia	Bartek Koszyk	263 episodes	
2013	Father Matthew	Igor	1 episode	
2015	Krew z krwi	Mateusz	8 episodes	
2016	Singielka	Krystian	15 episodes	
2017–2019	Ultraviolet	Kamil Łoziński	5 episodes	
2018	Drogi wolności	Albert Rudzki	1 episode	
2019	Odwróceni. Ojcowie i córki	Karol Iwaniszczuk	6 episodes	
2020–2022	Angel of Death	Tomasz Mrówiec	Main role; 21 episodes	
2021–2023	Sexify	Konrad	9 episodes	
2022	Family Secrets	Jan Jaworowicz	8 episodes	
2023	Kres niewinnosci	Krzysztof Dunin	4 episodes	
2023	1670	Henryk Lubopolski	1 episode	
2024	The Bay of Spies	Franz Neumann	Main role; 9 episodes	
2025	Scheda	Maciej Mróz		
