= Floating Skyscrapers =

2013 Polish drama film

- Polish theatrical release poster
- Directed by: Tomasz Wasilewski
- Written by: Tomasz Wasilewski
- Produced by: Roman Jarosz; Izabela Igel; Łukasz Targosz (co-producer); Szymon Lenkowski (co-producer)
- Starring: Mateusz Banasiuk; Marta Nieradkiewicz; Bartosz Gelner; Katarzyna Herman; Izabela Kuna; Mirosław Zbrojewicz; Olga Frycz
- Cinematography: Kuba Kijowski
- Edited by: Aleksandra Gowin
- Music by: Baasch
- Production companies: Alter Ego Pictures; Polish Film Institute
- Distributed by: Film Point Group (Poland); Galapagos Films (Poland, home video); Matchbox Films (United Kingdom); Films Boutique (worldwide)
- Release dates: 18 April 2013 (Tribeca); 22 November 2013 (Poland); 6 December 2013 (United Kingdom)
- Running time: 93 minutes
- Country: Poland
- Language: Polish
- Box office: $137,832 (Poland)

Floating Skyscrapers (Polish: Płynące wieżowce) is a 2013 Polish drama film written and directed by Tomasz Wasilewski, and starring Mateusz Banasiuk, Marta Nieradkiewicz, Bartosz Gelner and Katarzyna Herman. It follows the story of Kuba, an aspiring professional swimmer who falls in love with another man to the disapproval of his mother and to the surprise of his girlfriend, who tries to hold on to him and their relationship.

Premiering at the 2013 Tribeca Film Festival in New York City, the film is the first Polish production that primarily deals with the topic of same-sex relationships, and is often paired together with In the Name Of by Małgorzata Szumowska—which covers the same themes in a different manner—as films that attempt to challenge existing local social and cultural norms on homosexuality. Set in Warsaw, the film is noted for using the urban landscape and its largely clean, straight aesthetic as a means of conveying the existence of these strict pre-existing social conventions, which the film's storyline attempts to deviate from.

Reactions to the film by both critics and the general public were mixed. While some have praised the bravery of the film for covering a topic generally considered by Polish society to be taboo, as well as for its cinematography and soundtrack, others have criticized the film's flat storyline and character development, as well as its predictable, conventional, tragic end.

== Plot ==
Kuba (Mateusz Banasiuk) has been training as a swimmer for fifteen years, with training taking up most of his day. One evening after training, his girlfriend, Sylwia (Marta Nieradkiewicz), picks him up and brings him to an art exhibition, grudgingly agreeing to go and showing obvious disinterest. Kuba later retreats outside and smokes a joint, where he meets Michał (Bartosz Gelner), and the two strike up a conversation to Sylwia's delight. She later joins the two of them with a few other attendees at the basement, where Kuba asks her to take him home.

The next morning, Kuba's mother, Ewa (Katarzyna Herman), urges him to have Sylwia move out of the apartment, which she owns. The relationship between the two women is tense, as demonstrated by her exasperation at Sylwia taking a long time in the shower. He protests, noting that she helps in paying the rent and that he wants her to stay with him. Later, Kuba trains at the gym, where, unbeknownst to those closest to him, he ogles at the other men training, and after taking a shower, receives oral sex from another male cruiser inside a bathroom cubicle, which is also alluded to in the first scene of the film, where moans can be heard from the same place. Although he enjoys the experience, he resists the other man's attempt at kissing him and storms out of the cubicle, meeting Sylwia later at the restaurant where she works.

Later that evening, as Kuba and Sylwia were about to have sex, Michał calls, asking Kuba to meet him. Sylwia complains, but Kuba tells her that he has to go, and Michał later picks him up along the Trasa Toruńska. Both head into a parking garage, and while smoking a joint together, Kuba tells Michał that he has been with Sylwia for two years, and after driving to the top of the garage, both eventually stay there until the next morning. Later in the day, Kuba swims to the delight of his coach (Mariusz Drężek), who encourages him to swim as he did earlier so that he would win the competition and qualify for the team.

Kuba and Michał later go inside a train yard and have fun riding a moving freight train. At the same time, Sylwia waits for Kuba at the pool, worried, though she says nothing's wrong. That evening, Kuba can't sleep, and asks Sylwia who she belongs to, to which she responds that she is his. After running in the forest the next morning, Kuba invites Michał for lunch at his house. Not expecting that Sylwia would arrive early, the three have a silent lunch in the living room. That evening, Michał admits to his mother that he loves Kuba, but is afraid to tell his father.

At the swimming competition, though Kuba swims faster than the other competitors, he suddenly stops mid-way on the third lap to the surprise of his coach, who repeatedly asks him why he did it. He storms out of the swimming pool, heading to the building where Michał lives, tearily looking at him as he smokes in the balcony. As he sits by the elevator, a pair of guys call him out, with one calling him a fag. Kuba chases him outside and beats him up, denying that he is gay. That evening, during a family dinner, Michał comes out to his family, and professes his love for Kuba to his mother while she drives on the highway.

Later, Kuba confesses his relationship to his mother, but Ewa rejects him. Ewa then tells Sylwia and later that night, Sylwia reveals she is pregnant to Kuba—he attempts to absolve himself of responsibility for the child, but his mother demands that he get a job to support Sylwia and never see Michał again. Kuba is then shown—emotionally—breaking up with Michał over the phone while an impassive Sylwia stands in the hallway behind him.

In the next scene, Michał has a heart-to-heart with his father in which the meaning of the title of the film is explained. After, he goes to the parking garage and is ambushed by a group of men led by the guy who Kuba beat up earlier. Michał is brutally punched and kicked, dying after his head is repeatedly smashed into the cement floor of the garage.

The final scene is of Kuba and Sylwia in the bathtub. After giving her a short shoulder massage, she turns to face him and they stare impassively at each other for a few moments before Kuba gets out of the tub and walks away.

== Cast and characters ==
- Mateusz Banasiuk as Kuba
- Marta Nieradkiewicz as Sylwia, Kuba's girlfriend
- Bartosz Gelner as Michał
- Katarzyna Herman as Ewa, Kuba's mother
- Olga Frycz as Monika, friend of Sylwia
- Izabela Kuna as Krystyna, Michał's mother
- Mirosław Zbrojewicz as Jacek, Michał's father
- Mariusz Drężek as Kuba's coach

== Awards and nominations ==
Selected awards and nominations include:

- 2013 : Transilvania International Film Festival - Best Director
- 2013 : Karlovy Vary International Film Festival - East of West Award
- 2013 : Camerimage Festival - Best Cinematography Debut nomination
- 2013 : New Horizons Film Festival - Audience Award and Grand Prix nomination
- 2013 : Gdynia Film Festival - Special Youth Jury Award and Grand Prix nomination
- 2014 : Polish Film Awards - Best Supporting Actress nomination for Marta Nieradkiewicz
