= Squared Love =

2021 Polish film

- Official release poster
- Polish: Miłość do kwadratu
- Directed by: Filip Zylber
- Written by: Wiktor Piątkowski; Marzanna Polit
- Produced by: Magdalena Szwedkowicz
- Starring: Adrianna Chlebicka; Mateusz Banasiuk; Agnieszka Żulewska; Anna Smołowik; Krzysztof Czeczot; Mirosław Baka; Tomasz Karolak
- Cinematography: Maciej Lisiecki
- Edited by: Krzysztof Boroń
- Music by: Michał Kush
- Production company: Endemol Shine Polska
- Distributed by: Netflix
- Release date: 11 February 2021 (Poland)
- Running time: 133 minutes
- Country: Poland
- Language: Polish

Squared Love (Polish: Miłość do kwadratu) is a 2021 Polish romantic comedy film directed by Filip Zylber, written by Wiktor Piątkowski and Marzanna Polit and starring Adrianna Chlebicka, Mateusz Banasiuk and Mirosław Baka. The film is set in Warsaw, Poland, and follows a popular journalist falling in love with a model leading a double life. It was released on 11 February 2021 by Netflix.

Netflix announced in their Q1 2021 investor letter that 31 million households around the world had sampled the movie.

Two sequels were released in 2023: Squared Love All Over Again and Squared Love Everlasting.

== Cast ==
- Adrianna Chlebicka as Monika Grabarczyk / Klaudia
- Mateusz Banasiuk as Stefan Tkaczyk "Enzo"
- Agnieszka Żulewska as Alicia
- Krzysztof Czeczot as Jacek Szczepański
- Mirosław Baka as Monika's father
- Tomasz Karolak as school principal
- Bartłomiej Kotschedoff as Szymon
- Jacek Knap as Andrzej Tkaczyk
- Anna Smołowik as Ilona Szczepańska
- Helena Mazur as Ania Tkaczyk
- Sebastian Stankiewicz as Wiesiek
- Jarosław Boberek as director

== Reception ==
On the review aggregator website Rotten Tomatoes, 17% of six critics' reviews are positive, with an average rating of 4.20/10.
