= Carl Zöllner =

Carl Zöllner may refer to:

- Carl Friedrich Zöllner (1800–1860), German composer and choir director
- Carl Heinrich Zöllner (1792–1836), German composer
