= Baasch (musician) =

Polish musician

- Born: Bartosz Schmidt
- Origin: Warsaw, Poland
- Genres: Indie pop; synth-pop
- Occupations: Musician, producer
- Instrument: Vocals
- Years active: 2013–present
- Labels: Sensefloor, Nextpop
- Member of: Miennta, Plazmatikon

Baasch, born Bartosz Schmidt, is a Polish musician and producer from Warsaw. He won the Fryderyk award for the best electronic album in 2021 and was nominated in 2022. His music can primarily be categorised as synth-pop but takes various influences from electronic and club music, which is more evident in Schmidt’s soundtrack work.

Baasch has performed extensively in Poland, including at many open-air festivals like Open'er, Audioriver, Tauron Nowa Muzyka, and Męskie Granie, as well as in Germany (Reeperbahn Festival), Hungary (Sziget Festival), Lithuania (Vilnius Music Week), and Czechia (Rock for People)

== Career ==
In 2013, Baasch released the four-track EP Simple Dark Romantic Songs on the Sensefloor label. The same year, he composed music for the film Floating Skyscrapers. His second EP, Siamese Sister, followed in 2014. That year, Baasch signed a deal with Nextpop and published his debut full-length album, Corridors. A companion album, Re_Corr, came out in 2016 and consisted of remixes of songs from Corridor by various artists. On 21 April 2017, Baasch issued his third studio album, Grizzly Bear with a Million Eyes, which spawned the singles "Kind of Coma" and "Dare to Take (feat. Mary Komasa)".

In 2020, Baasch signed with PIAS and issued his first Polish-language album, titled Noc, producing the singles "Brokat", "Cienie", and "Miasto". In 2021, he scored the musical Balladyna. Echa Grobowych Rozwalin and subsequently published NCRMX, a collection of remixes of tracks from Noc by various artists.

Baasch began issuing his fourth album, titled IV, in several parts. The first one, IV!I, was released on 15 September 2023, following the "Wosk" and "Słońce" singles. Further instalments were already teased during summer festival shows, including an Audioriver Festival performance in Płock, where Baasch appeared together with German electronic artist Rosa Anschütz.

== Discography ==
Studio albums

- Corridors (2014)
- Grizzly Bear with a Million Eyes (2017)
- Noc (2020)

EPs

- Simple Dark Romantic Songs (2013)
- Siamese Sister (2014)
- IV!I (2023)
- IV!II (2024)

Remix albums

- Re_Corr (2016)
- Ncrmx (2021)

Soundtracks

- Floating Skyscrapers (2013)
- Balladyna. Echa Grobowych Rozwalin (2021)

Singles

- "Several Gods" (2014)
- "Shout" (2016)
- "Kind of Coma" (2017)
- "Dare to Take (feat. Mary Komasa) (2018)
- "Brokat" (2020)
- "Cienie" (2020)
- "Język" (2020)
- "Miasto" (2020)
- "Sportowa Warszawa (feat. Kacperczyk)" (2021)
- "Perfect Beach (with Rafał Dutkiewicz, Novika, and Meeting by Chance)" (2021)
- "Jestem" (with Catz 'N Dogz) (2022)
- "Puls" (with Paulina Przybysz) (2022)
- "Wosk" (2023)
- "Słońce" (2023)
- "Tlen" (2023)
- "Mosty" (2024)

Guest appearances and contributions

- Venter – "Fire" (2015)
- Rysy – Traveler (2015)
- Sotei – Sotei (2017)
- New Rome – "Childish Comeback (feat. Baasch)" (2019)
- Various Artists – About Us (2024)
