= Chain Reaction (2017 film) =

- Film poster
- Directed by: Jakub Pączek
- Written by: Jakub Pączek
- Produced by: Filip Bajon
- Starring: Małgorzata Mikołajczak, Tomasz Włosok, Bartosz Gelner, Wiktoria Stachowicz
- Cinematography: Piotr Śliskowski
- Music by: Muchy
- Production companies: D35, Kino Świat, Polish Film Institute
- Distributed by: Kino Świat
- Release date: 8 December 2017 (Poland)
- Running time: 100 minutes
- Country: Poland
- Language: Polish

Chain Reaction (Polish: Reakcja łańcuchowa) is a 2017 Polish drama film directed by Jakub Pączek. The release date is September 20, 2017. The film is dedicated to deceased film director Krzysztof Szot. The movie was shot in Warsaw, Poland.

== Plot ==
The "chain reaction" that is the focal point of the movie has its origins in the 1986 Chernobyl disaster. The film's chief protagonist Marta, played by Małgorzata Mikołajczak, and her husband Adam (Tomasz Włosok) plan their wedding. The couple's friend Paweł (Bartosz Gelner), a film director, who after making an irreversible decision sets out an unstoppable set of events.

== Cast ==
- Małgorzata Mikołajczak as Marta
- Tomasz Włosok as Adam
- Bartosz Gelner as Paweł
- Wiktoria Stachowicz as Asia
- Anna Radwan as Adam's mother
- Andrzej Mastalerz as Adam's step-father

== Nominations ==
- ZŁOTE LWY (Golden lions) – Participation in the broadcast competition – Jakub Pączek
- MŁODZI I FILM (YOUTH AND FILM) Feature Film Debuts Competition – Participation in the main competition – Jakub Pączek
- ORŁY HOLLYWODZKIE (HOLLYWOOD EAGLES) – Participation in the main competition – Jakub Pączek
