= The Bay of Spies =

Polish historical drama miniseries

- Polish poster
- Polish: Zatoka szpiegów
- Genre: Historical drama
- Written by: Michał Godzic; Wojciech Lepianka
- Directed by: Michał Rogalski
- Starring: Bartosz Gelner; Karolina Kominek; Mariusz Bonaszewski; Wiktoria Supryn; Michał Balicki; Maria Świłpa
- Country of origin: Poland
- No. of seasons: 2
- No. of episodes: 19

Production
- Producer: Michał Kwieciński
- Cinematography: Maciej Lisiecki
- Editors: Marcin Kot Bastkowski; Tomasz Ciesielski
- Running time: 45 minutes
- Production company: Akson Studio

Original release
- Network: TVP
- Release: 7 January 2024 – present

The Bay of Spies (Polish: Zatoka szpiegów) is a 2024 Polish historical drama television series. It began airing on TVP on 7 January 2024.

== Premise ==
In 1940s Gdynia, a Nazi Abwehr officer discovers his Polish origins and decides to become an Allied spy. He is tasked with obtaining intelligence about the Kriegsmarine during the ongoing Battle of the Atlantic.

== Cast ==
- Bartosz Gelner as Franz Neumann
- Karolina Kominek as Greta
- Mariusz Bonaszewski as Commander Kessler
- Wiktoria Supryn as Ilse
- Michał Balicki as Engel
- Maria Świłpa as Anna
- Anna Radwan as Rosa Neumann, Franz's mother
- Karol Biskup as Staszek
- Karol Pocheć as Johann
- Anna Karczmarczyk

== Episodes ==
=== Series overview ===
Series	Episodes	Originally released	
Series	Episodes	First released	Last released
1	9	7 January 2024	3 March 2024
2	10	2 March 2025	4 May 2025

=== Season 1 (2024) ===
No. overall	No. in season	Title	Original release date
1	1	"Episode 1"	7 January 2024
2	2	"Episode 2"	14 January 2024
3	3	"Episode 3"	21 January 2024
4	4	"Episode 4"	28 January 2024
5	5	"Episode 5"	4 February 2024
6	6	"Episode 6"	11 February 2024
7	7	"Episode 7"	18 February 2024
8	8	"Episode 8"	25 February 2024
9	9	"Episode 9"	3 March 2024

=== Season 2 (2025) ===
No. overall	No. in season	Title	Original release date
10	1	"Episode 10"	2 March 2025
11	2	"Episode 11"	9 March 2025
12	3	"Episode 12"	16 March 2025
13	4	"Episode 13"	23 March 2025
14	5	"Episode 14"	30 March 2025
15	6	"Episode 15"	6 April 2025
16	7	"Episode 16"	13 April 2025
17	8	"Episode 17"	20 April 2025
18	9	"Episode 18"	27 April 2025
19	10	"Episode 19"	4 May 2025

== Production ==
Filming for the series began on 5 May 2023 in Gdańsk and later moved to Gdynia and Sopot. Filming was completed by June 2023. A press screening of the series took place on 9 November 2023.
