= Adam Gdacius =

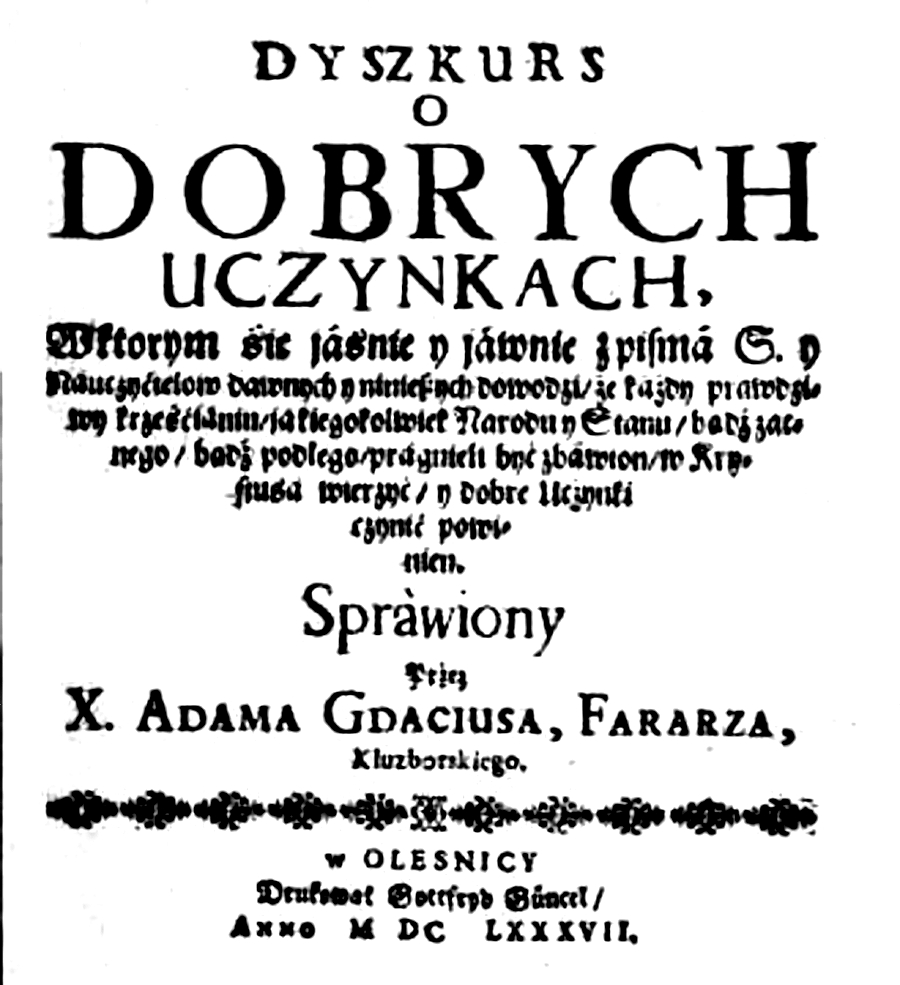
Book of Gdacius in Polish "Dyszkurs o dobrych uczynkach", published in Oleśnica 1687.

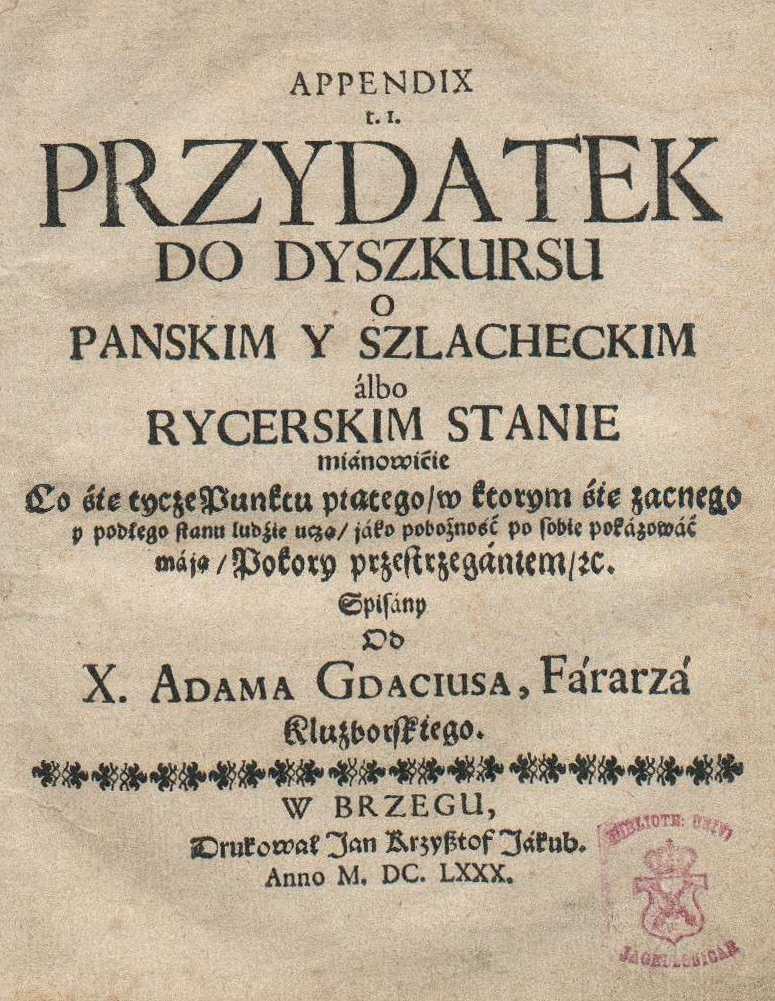
Book of Gdacius in Polish "Przydatek o stanie rycerskim", published in Brzeg 1687.

Adam Gdacius or Gdacjusz or Gdak, also called Rey of Silesia (1615 – 1688) was a Polish-language writer and a Lutheran pastor at the Wilna church

He was born and died in the Silesian town of Kreuzburg (now Kluczbork), where from 1644 was a deacon and, later, a parish priest. He wrote sermons and moralizing literature in Polish and Latin, mainly in the years 1674–1687.

== Published works ==
- Kwestyja o pojedynkach
- O pańskim i szlacheckim stanie albo rycerskim dyszkurs
- Dyszkurs o pijaństwie
- Kwestyja o polygamijej albo wielożeństwie
- Trojaki o ołtarzach, obrazach i organach dyszkurs
- Kwestyja o zmartwychwstaniu
- Kwestyjej o Pannie Maryjej
- Dyszkurs o dobrych uczynkach

== Sources ==
- https://olesnica.nienaltowski.net/GdacjuszAdam.htm — about Adam Gdacius (in Polish)
