= Oleśnica Castle =

Castle in southwest Poland

Coordinates: 51°12′32″N 17°22′35″E

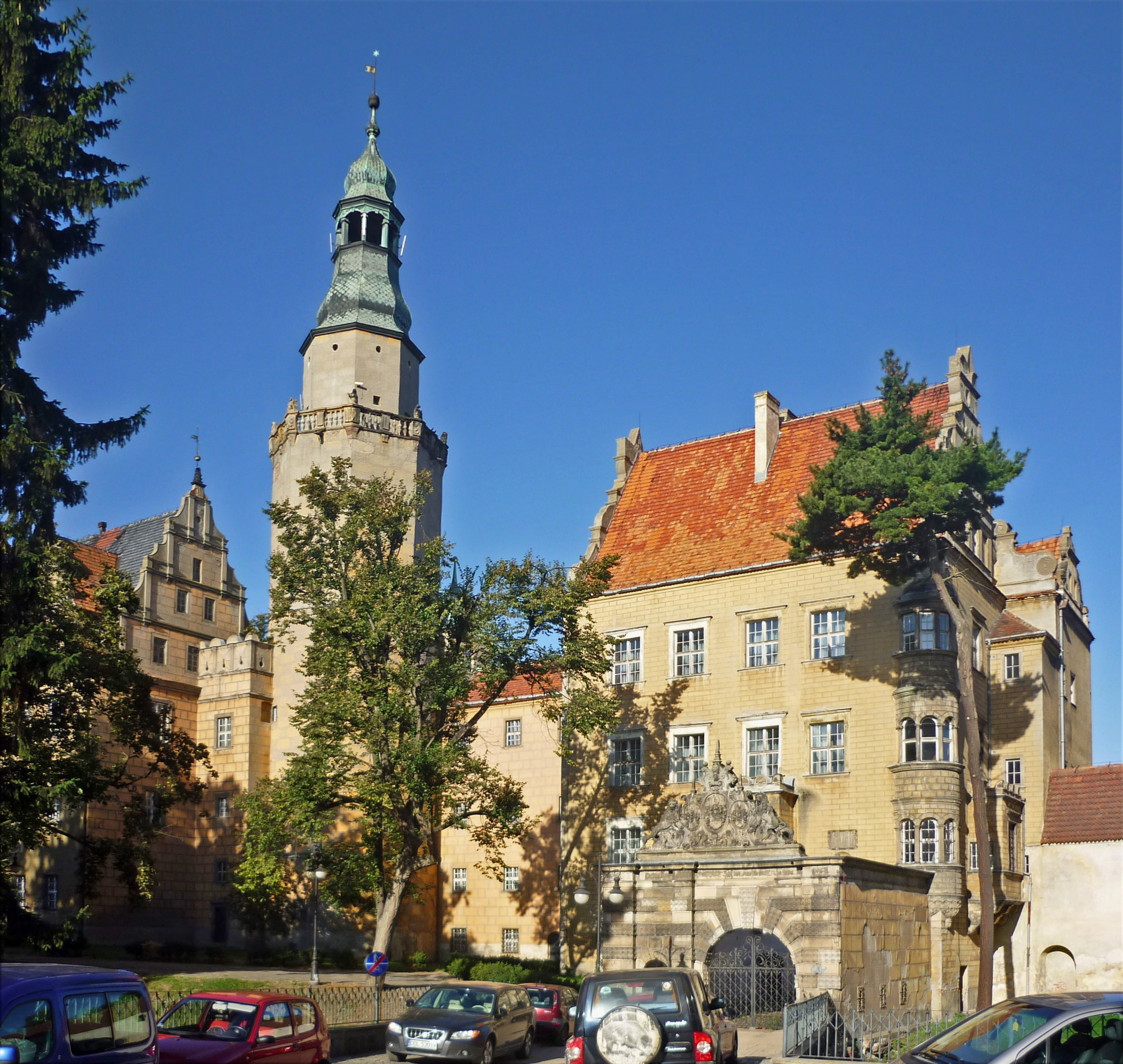
Main entrance to the Castle

Oleśnica Castle (Polish: Zamek oleśnicki, German: Schloss Oels) is a castle in Oleśnica, Lower Silesian Voivodeship, southwestern Poland.

== History ==
It was erected in 1542–1561, replacing a Gothic fortress from the thirteenth century. It was the seat of the Dukes of Oleśnica until the nineteenth century, became the property of the crown prince of Prussia, and was restored in the 1890s. A fortified settlement was mentioned before the year 1238, and the first record of the castle dates from 1292. After World War II, the surviving buildings held Hungarian and Italian prisoners of war. Later, there was the Soviet branch office of the International Committee of the Red Cross. In the 1970s, the castle underwent another renovation and it became a branch of the Archaeological Museum in Wroclaw, until abandoned in 1993. It has since been reoccupied by the Voluntary Labour Corps.

== See also ==
- Castles in Poland
