= Marta Nieradkiewicz =

Polish actress (born 1983)

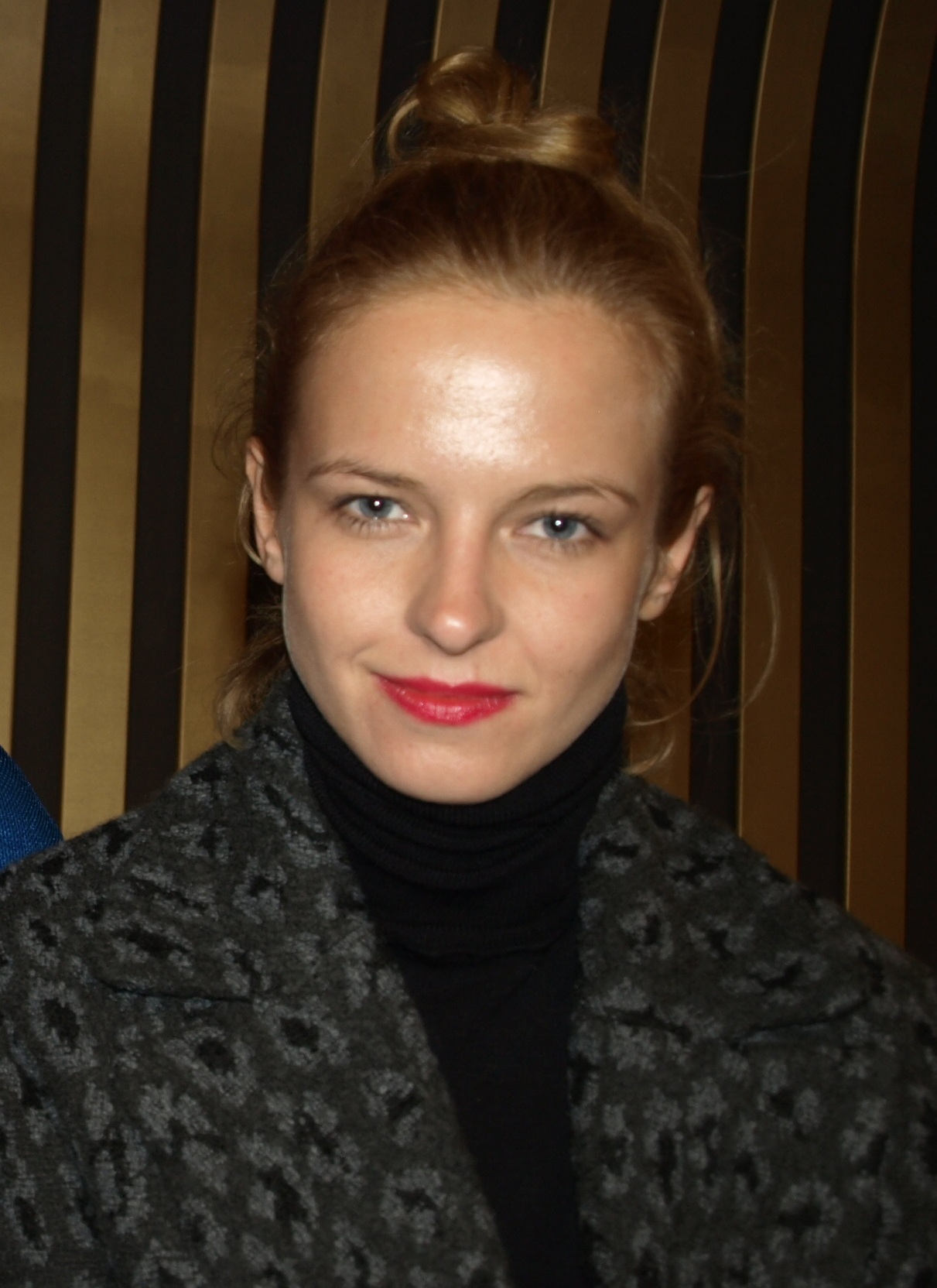
- Nieradkiewicz in 2013
- Born: 21 June 1983 (age 42); Łódź, Poland
- Occupation: Actress
- Years active: 2007–present

Marta Nieradkiewicz (born 21 June 1983) is a Polish actress. She received two Polish Film Awards nominations for performances in films Floating Skyscrapers (2013) and Anxiety (2024).

== Life and career ==
Nieradkiewicz was born and raised in Łódź, Poland and graduated from the Łódź Film School in 2007. Later that year she was cast in the daytime soap opera Barwy szczęścia and starred in show until 2014. She also made number of guest-starring appearances on prime time series, include Father Matthew, Prosto w serce and True Law. In 2013 she received Gdynia Film Festival Award for Best Supporting Actress and nomination for a Polish Academy Award for Best Supporting Actress for her role in the drama film, Floating Skyscrapers. In 2013 she began perform in the Helena Modrzejewska National Old Theatre.

Nieradkiewicz starred in a number of television series. She starred in the HBO Europe mystery thriller series Pakt (2015) and played the leading role in the AXN crime drama series, Ultraviolet (2017–2019). She starred in films United States of Love (2016), Wild Roses (2017), Solid Gold (2019) and Woman on the Roof (2022). She also was a cast member in the Netflix supernatural series Open Your Eyes (2021), and the miniseries High Water (2022). In 2024 she received Polish Academy Award for Best Actress nomination for her performance in the drama film, Anxiety (2024).

== Filmography ==
- Czlowiek wózków (2000)
- Non sono pronto (2010)
- Z milosci (2011)
- Floating Skyscrapers (2013)
- Mur (2015)
- United States of Love (2016)
- Kamper (2016)
- Szatan kazal tanczyc (2017)
- Wild Roses (2017)
- Solid Gold (2019)
- Woman on the Roof (2022)
- Fools (2022)
- Anxiety (2024)
- Zaprawdę Hitler umarł (2025) as journalist
