= Carl Heinrich Zöllner =

German composer

Carl Heinrich Zöllner (born modern Oleśnica, Poland; 1792 – 1836) was a German composer. He is mainly remembered for one surviving work, the opera Kunz von Kaufungen, which premiered at the Theater an der Wien in March 1826. An organ work, Variations pour l'Orgue sur le Theme God Save the King also survives, as well as two shorter organ works, Ziemlich Langsam and Andante.
