= Oleśnica =

Town in Lower Silesian Voivodeship, Poland

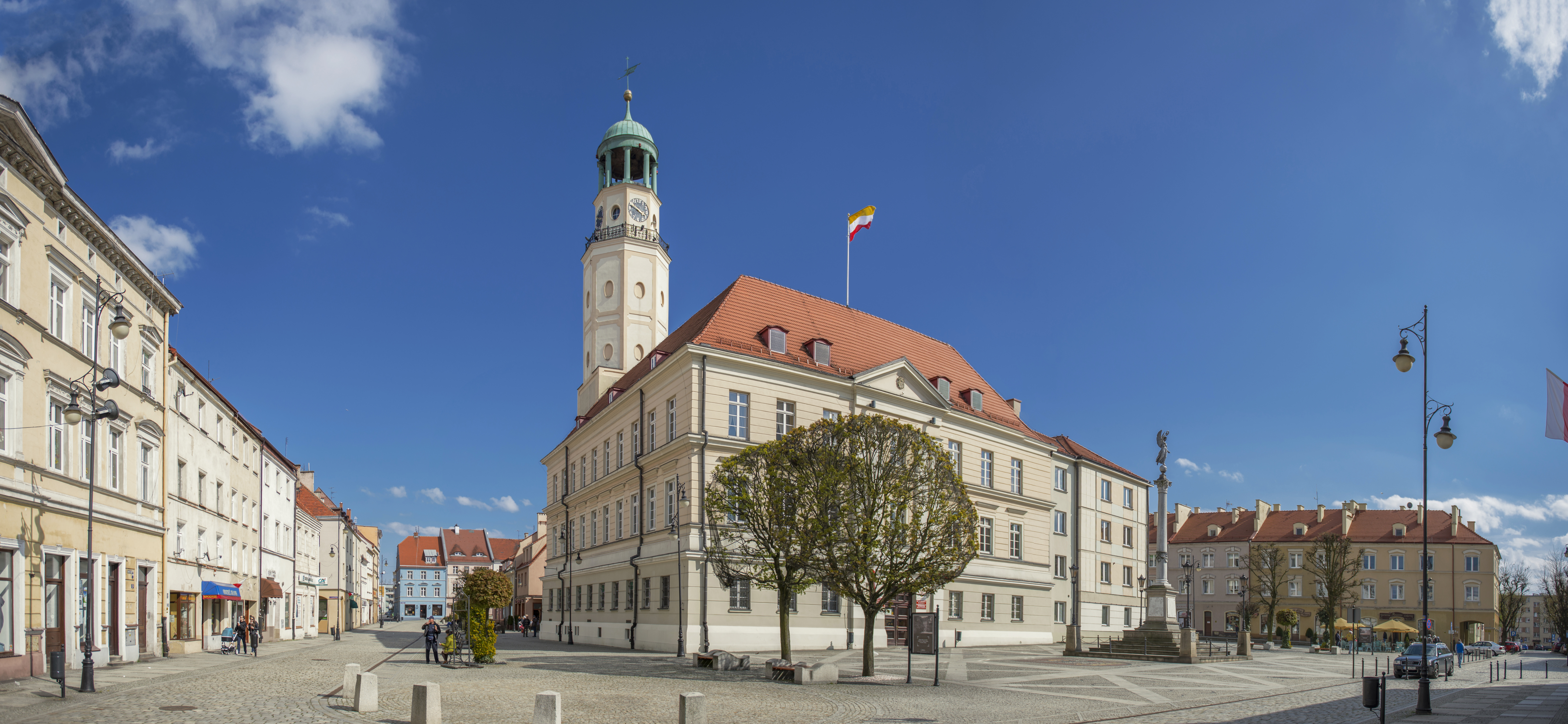
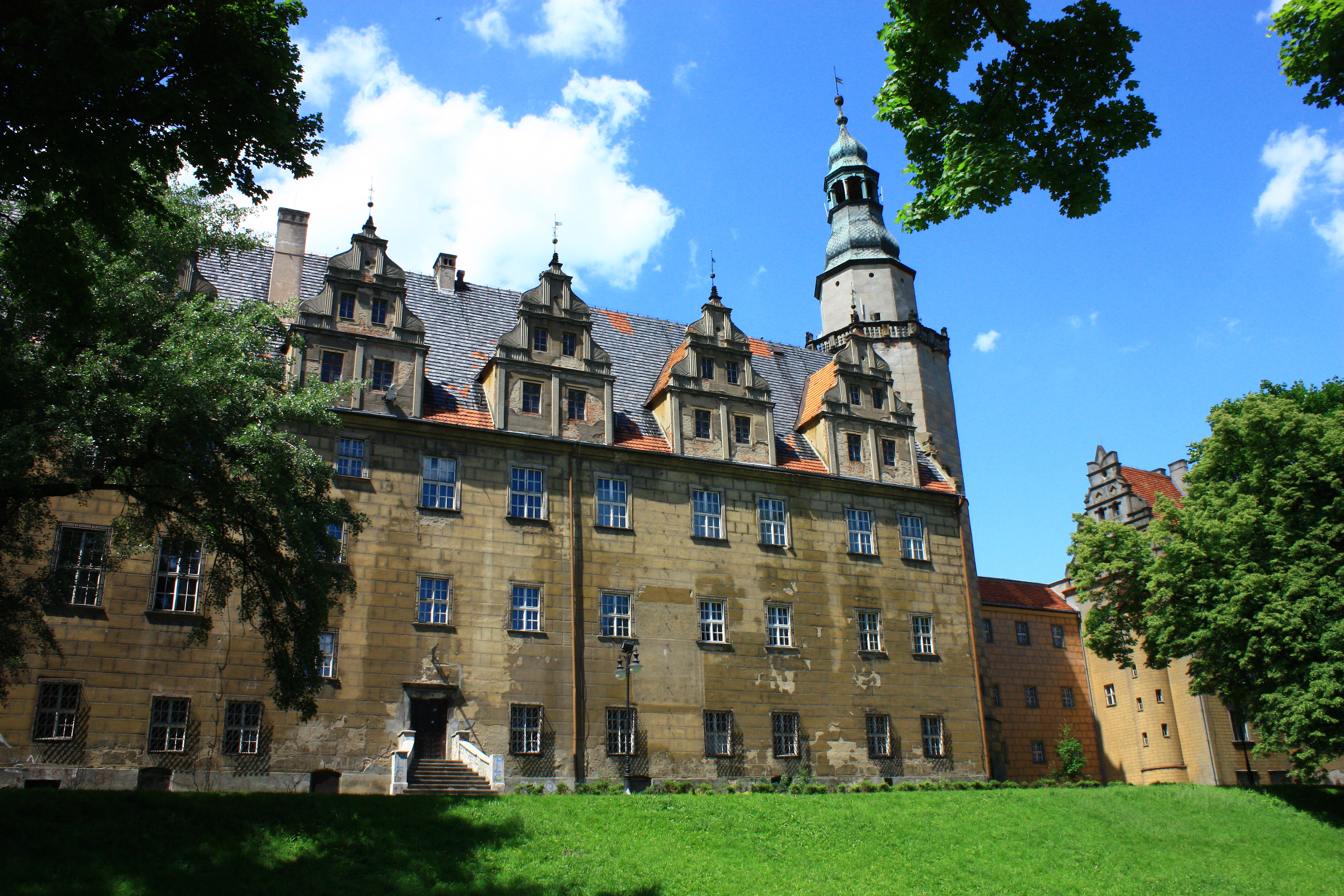
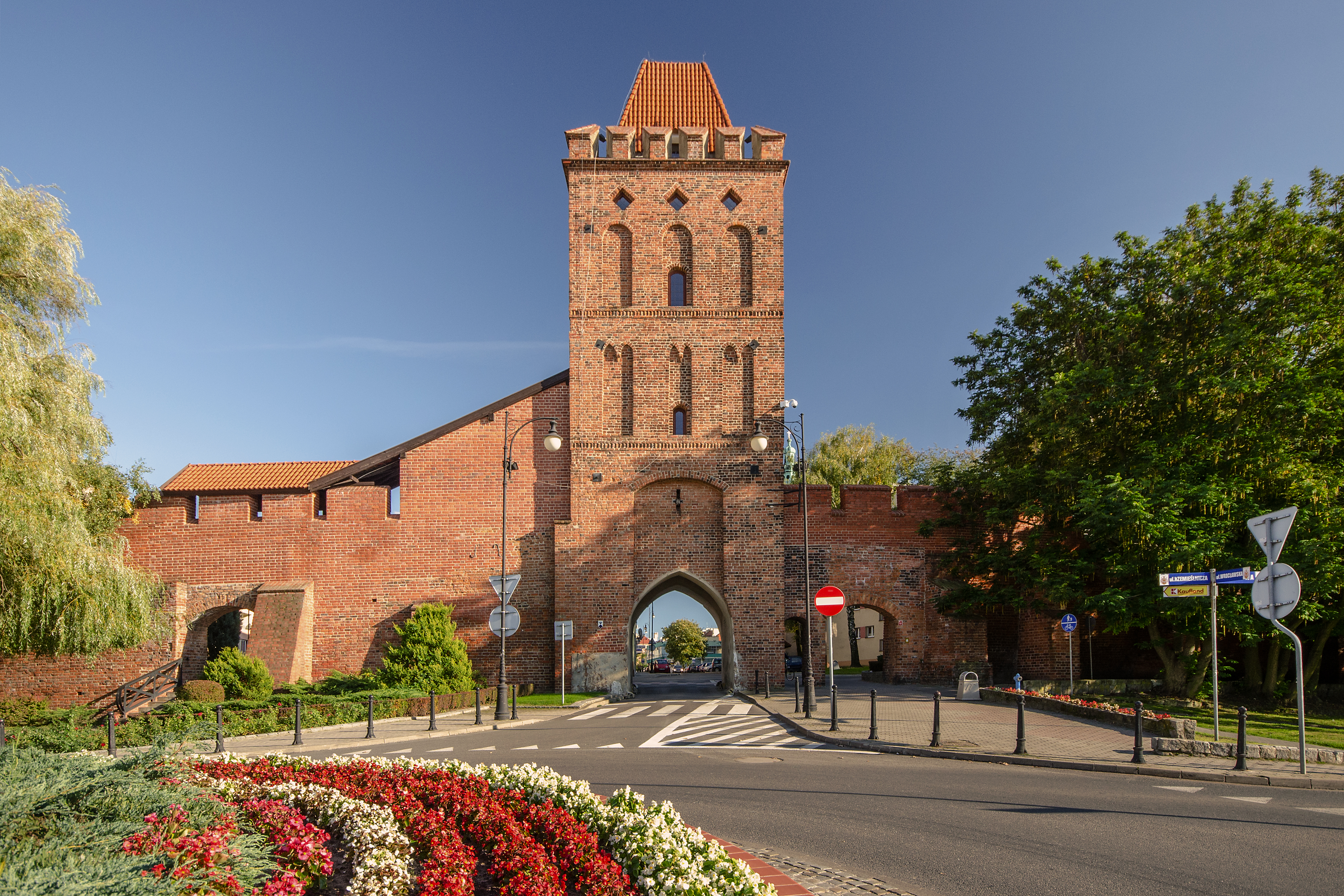
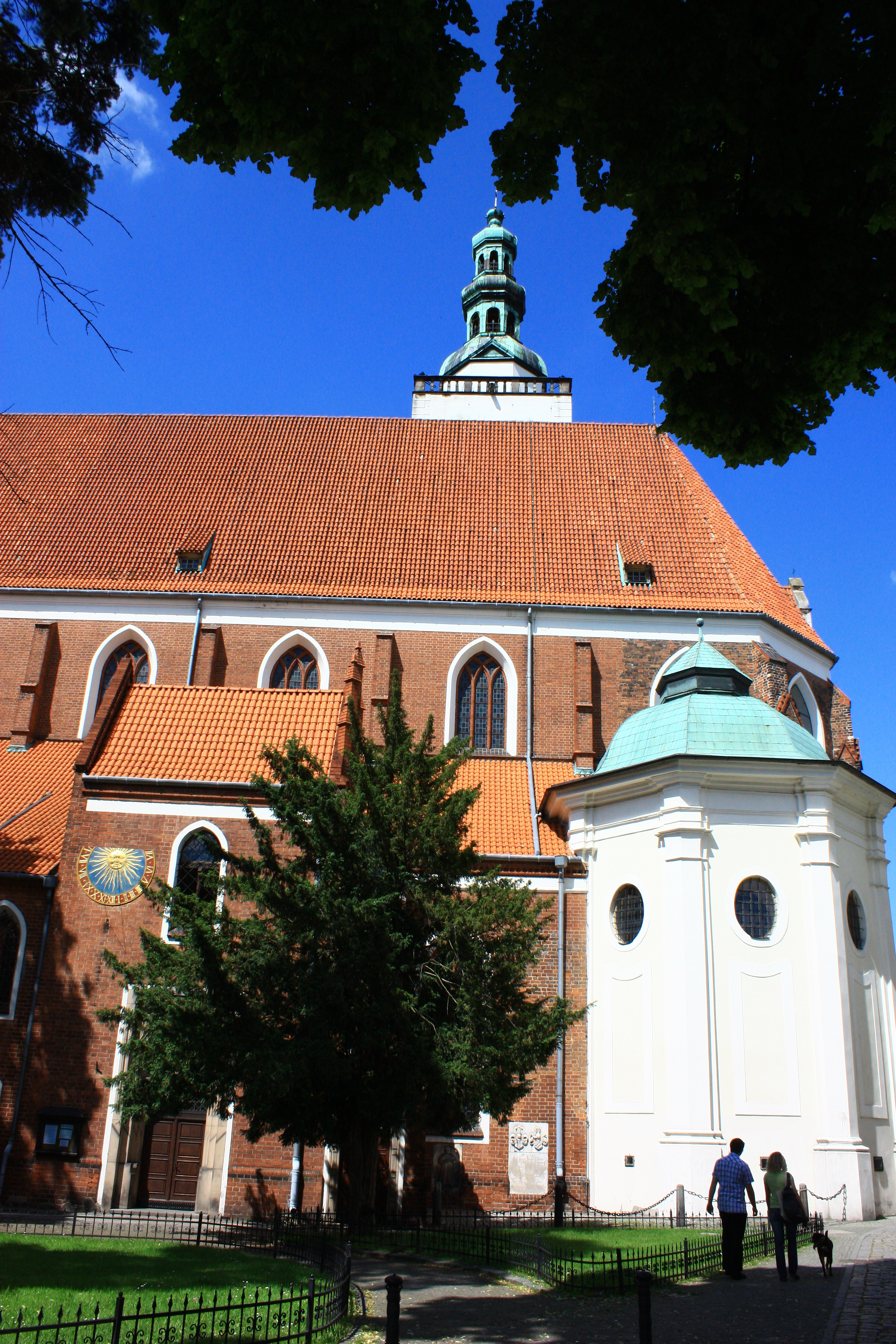
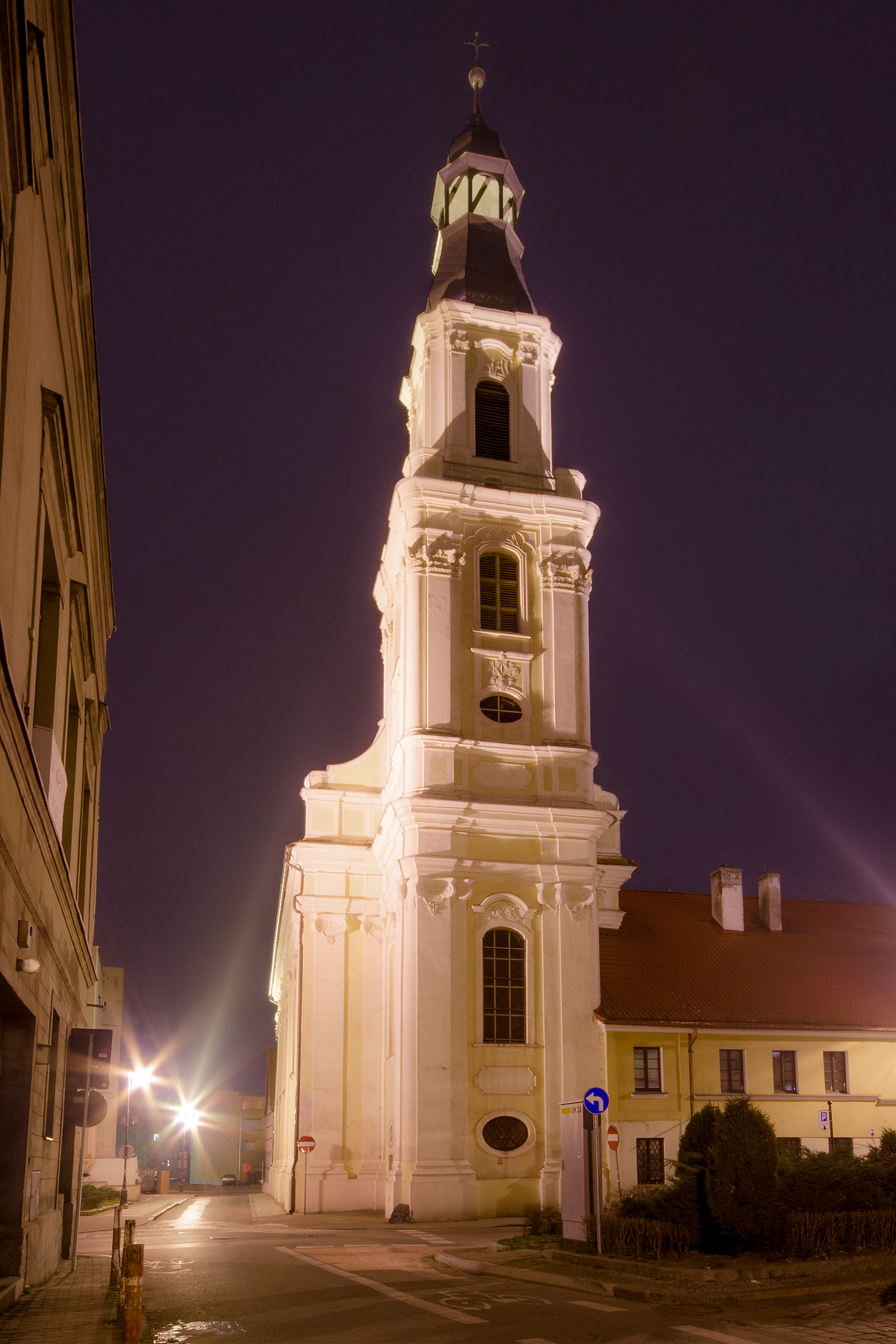
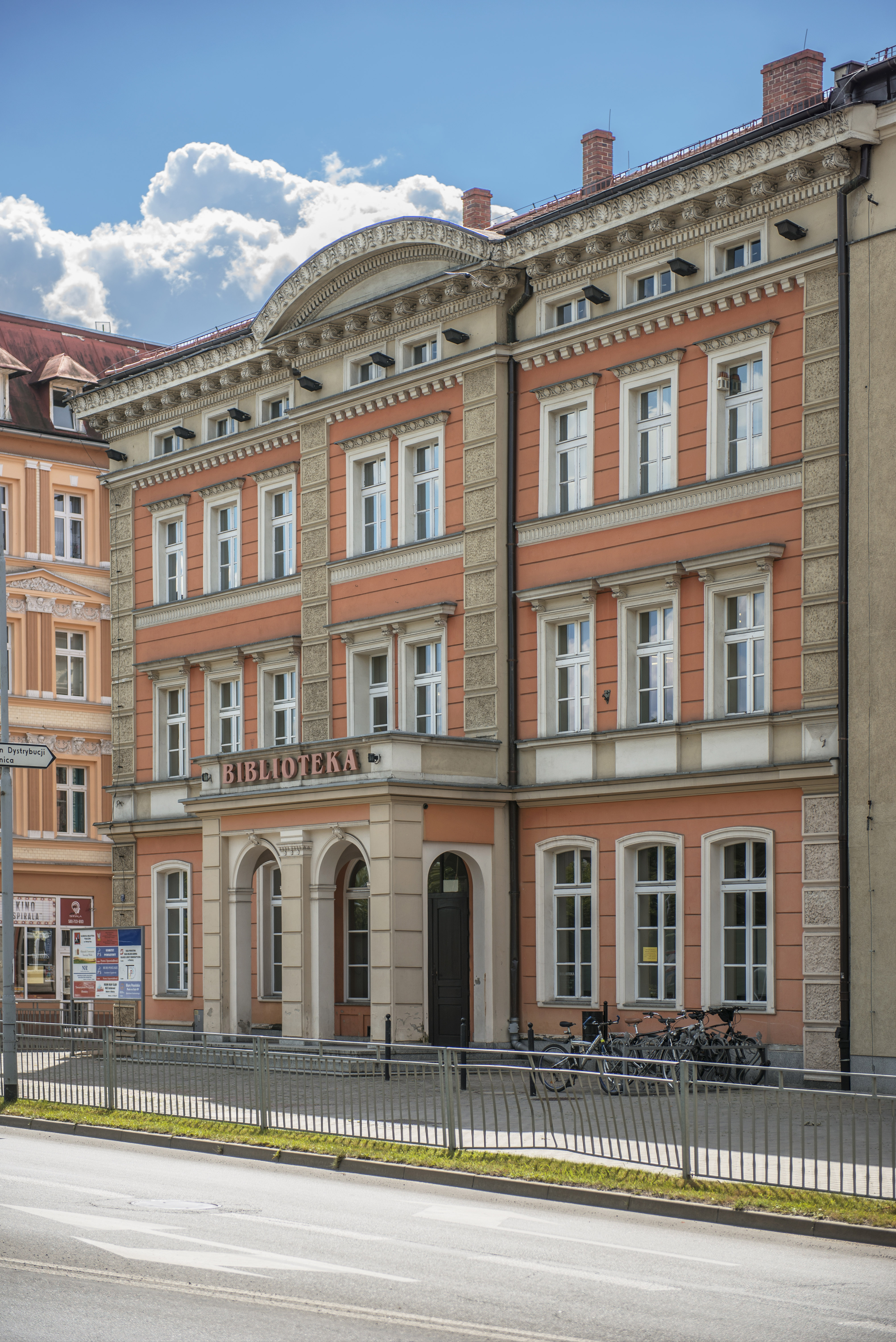
- Market Square and town hall Oleśnica Castle Wrocław Gate Saint John Basilica Holy Trinity Church Public library

- Flag Coat of arms
- Motto: Miasto wież i róż "A Town of Towers and Roses"
- Location within Poland
- Coordinates: 51°12′N 17°23′E
- Country: Poland
- Voivodeship: Lower Silesian Voivodeship
- County: Oleśnica
- Gmina: Oleśnica (urban gmina)
- First mentioned: 1189
- Town rights: 1255

Government
  - Mayor: Adam Horbacz

Area
  - Total: 20.96 km^{2} (8.09 sq mi)
- Elevation: 150 m (490 ft)

Population (2019-06-30)
  - Total: 37,169
  - Density: 1,773/km^{2} (4,593/sq mi)
- Time zone: UTC+1 (CET)
  - Summer (DST): UTC+2 (CEST)
- Postal code: 56-400
- Area code: +48 71
- Car plates: DOL
- Website: http://www.olesnica.pl

Oleśnica (Polish: [ɔlɛˈɕɲit͡sa]; German: Oels) is a town in Lower Silesian Voivodeship, in south-western Poland, within the Wrocław metropolitan area. It is the administrative seat of Oleśnica County and also of the rural district of Gmina Oleśnica, although it is not part of the territory of the latter, the town being an urban gmina in its own right.

Established in medieval Poland, Oleśnica was the capital of a small eponymous principality from 1313 to 1884. It was a notable center of Polish printing in the early modern period. The town is famed for its large 16th-century ducal castle. The castle's inner courtyard arcades, a masterpiece of Renaissance architecture, are iconic in the region. The town also contains architecture in other styles, including Gothic, Baroque, Neoclassical and Renaissance Revival, and is home of the only surviving chained library in Central Europe. It is located on the Route of the Heroes of the Battle of Warsaw 1920, the main highway connecting Wrocław with Łódź, Warsaw and Białystok.

== Name ==
The town's name comes from Polish olsza ("Alder"); Olcha is an Old Slavic word for this common plant and tree. On 22 February 1255 the Silesian duke Henry III the White, son of the Polish High Duke Henry II the Pious, vested civitas nostra Olsnicz ("our town Oleśnica") with town privileges.

== Geography ==
The town is situated in the Silesian Lowlands east of the Trzebnickie Hills, part of the historical region of Lower Silesia. It is situated on the Oleśnica River, a tributary of Widawa. Located about 30 kilometres (19 mi) northeast of the Silesian capital Wrocław, it has been a stop on an important trade route to the Greater Poland region, Kalisz, Łódź and Warsaw; it had close ties with Kraków via Namysłów in the east. It was the site of an important printing press and gymnasium.

The town quarters are Centrum, Serbinów, Lucień, Lucień Osiedle, Wądoły, Rataje (Stare, Nowe) and Zielone Ogrody.

== History ==
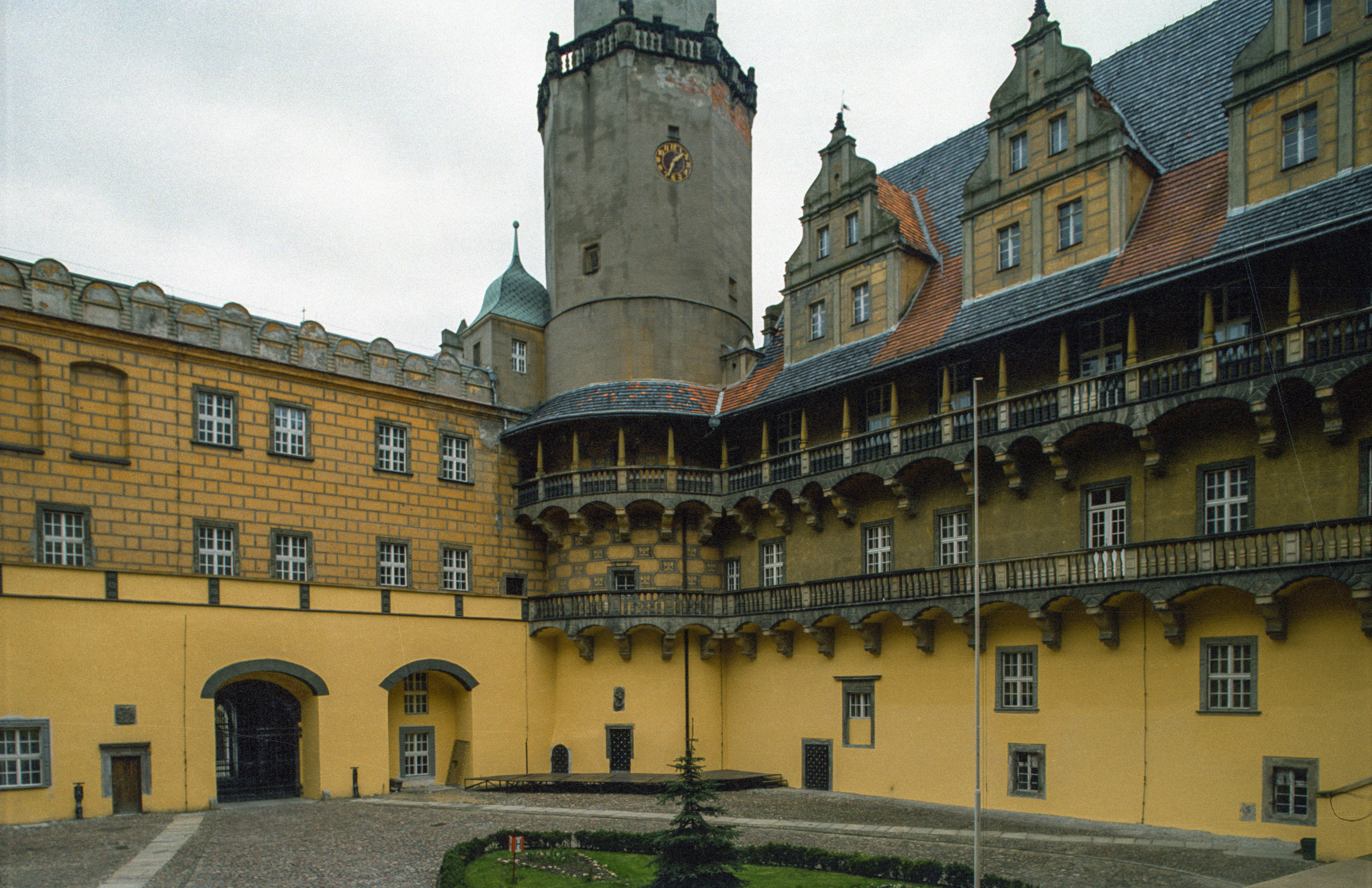
Oleśnica Castle, courtyard

The Piast castle with a nearby abbey and trading settlement was first mentioned in an 1189 deed. It was part of fragmented Poland under the Piast dynasty. In 1255, it was granted town rights by Duke Henry III the White. From the 13th century onwards, the area was largely settled by Germans in the course of the Ostsiedlung. From the 13th century, it had a coin mint. In the 13th century Oleśnica was part of the Duchy of Silesia, in 1294 it became part of the Duchy of Głogów and in 1313 it became capital of the Duchy of Oleśnica, just partitioned from Głogów. By that time a hospital already existed in Oleśnica, mentioned in a document from 1307. From 1320/21 the former castellany served as the residence of the Piast duke Konrad I of Oleśnica; his son Duke Konrad II the Gray also inherited Koźle. The dukes of Oleśnica in the 14th century still claimed to be heirs of the entire Kingdom of Poland, even though they ruled only in their principality, which caused animosity from other Polish dukes in Silesia and monarchs of all Poland. Oleśnica was located on an important trade route which connected Wrocław with Kalisz and Toruń.

In 1329, Duke Konrad I was forced to accept the overlordship of the Bohemian (Czech) Crown, although he retained vast autonomy. Local Polish dukes granted numerous privileges to Oleśnica, and the Duchy of Oleśnica was still ruled from the town until the 1492 death of Duke Konrad X the White, last of the local Piasts. During the Hussite Wars, Oleśnica was invaded by the Hussites in 1432, and later Polish–Hussite negotiations took place there. During the Bohemian–Hungarian War local dukes switched sides several times. In 1469 they recognized the overlordship of King Matthias Corvinus of Hungary, in the 1470s Duke Konrad X sided with Bohemian King Vladislaus Jagiellon, in 1480 he recognized Hungarian suzerainty again, and then revolted in 1489. Afterwards it was again a Bohemian fief.

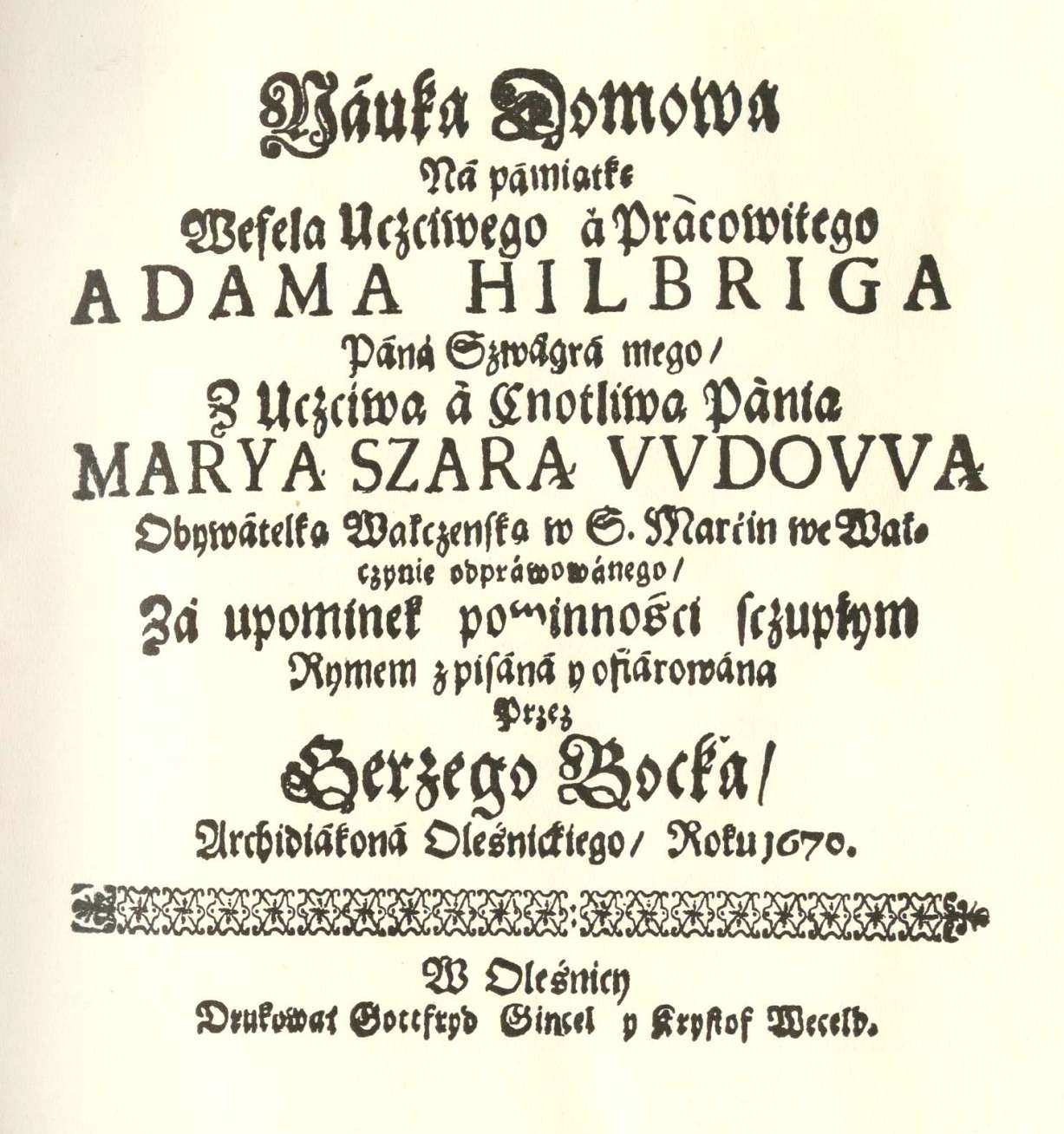
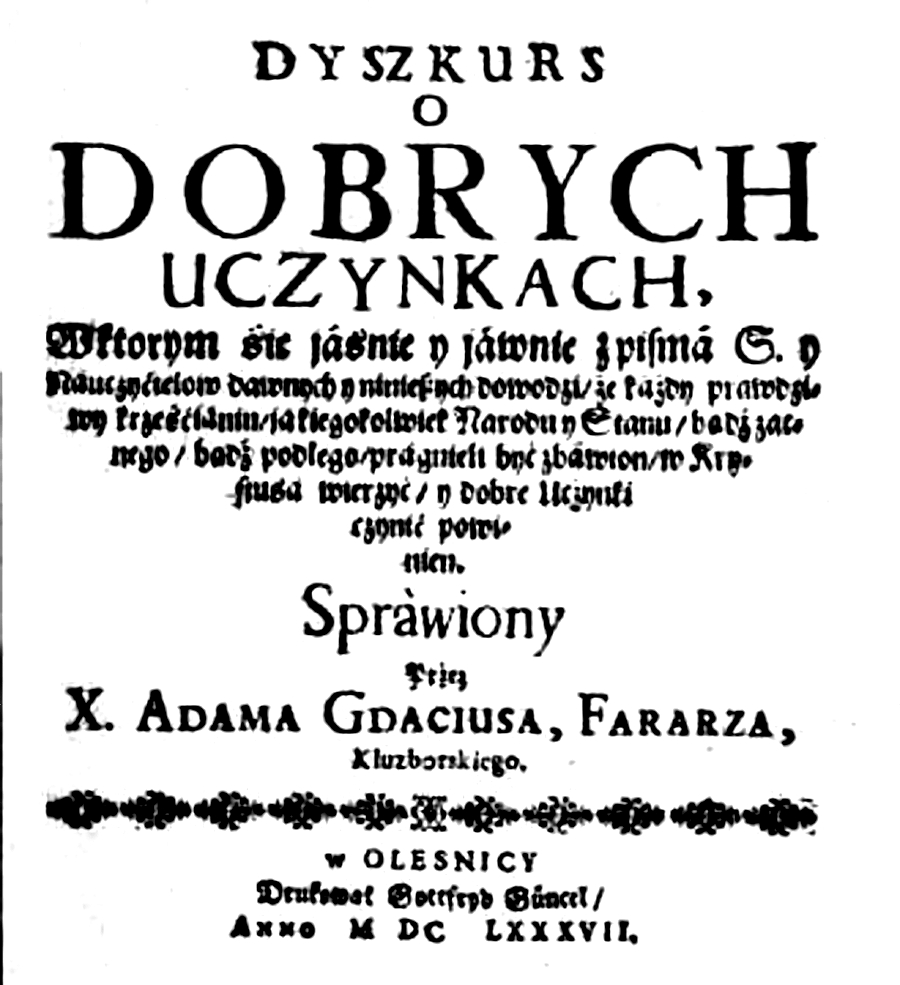
Polish books by Jerzy Bock and Adam Gdacius published in Oleśnica in 1670 and 1687

According to an agreement from 1491, the duchy was supposed to pass to future Polish King John I Albert, but eventually in 1495 it was sold to Duke Henry I of Münsterberg, son of the Bohemian (Czech) king George of Poděbrady. His grandson Duke John of Münsterberg-Oels established a gymnasium at Oleśnica in 1530. When the Czech Podiebrad family became extinct in 1647, town and duchy were inherited by the Swabian dukes of Württemberg, and in 1792 by the Welf dukes of Brunswick-Lüneburg.

On September 11, 1535, a violent F4 tornado completely destroyed part of the town. The written account of this tornado was done by Dr. Alfred Wegener, which is in the CLIMDAT archive located at Leipzig University and the F4 rating on the Fujita scale was assigned by the European Severe Storms Laboratory.

In the 17th century, the Polish-German language border ran close to Oleśnica, including the town to the territory dominated by the Polish language. Polish religious writers Adam Gdacius (nicknamed Rey of Silesia) and Jerzy Bock published their works in Oleśnica.

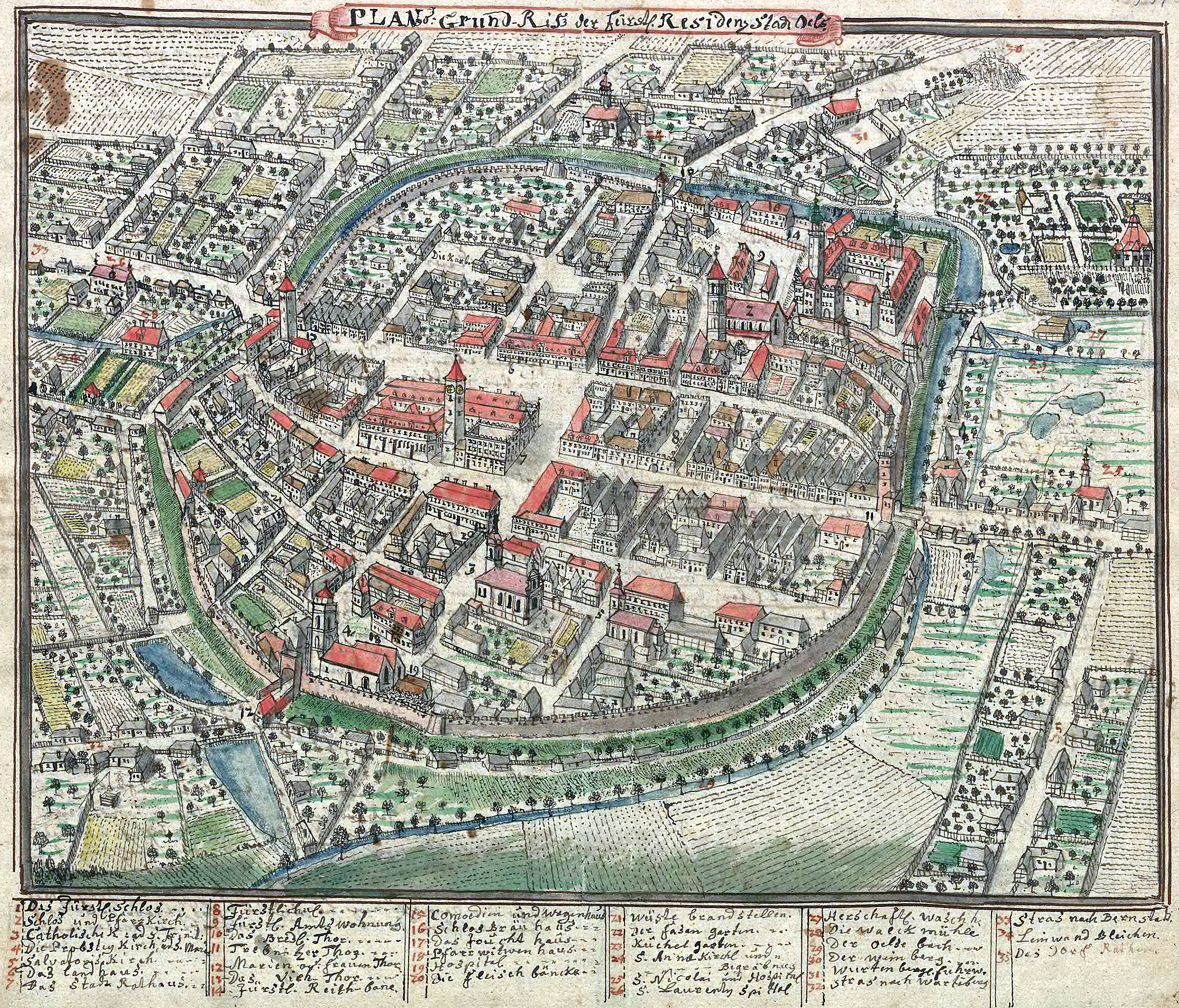
Oleśnica in the 18th century

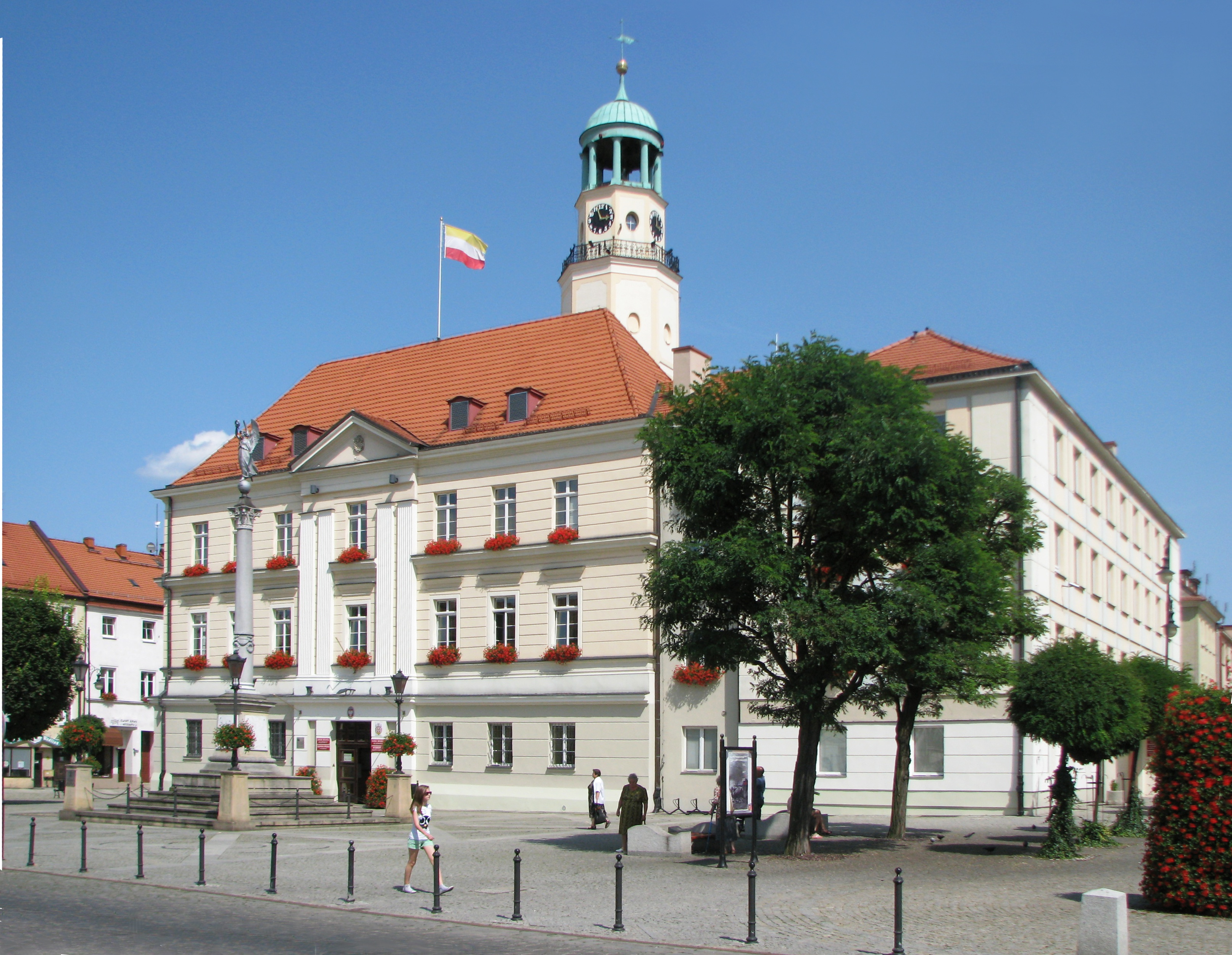
Town hall

In the 18th century, one of two main routes connecting Warsaw and Dresden ran through the town and Kings Augustus II the Strong and Augustus III of Poland often traveled that route. As a result of the First Silesian War the Duchy of Oels (Oleśnica) came under suzerainty of the Kingdom of Prussia in 1742. Following administrative reform in 1807 during the Napoleonic Wars, Oels became the seat of Landkreis Oels in the Province of Silesia, remaining capital of the Duchy of Oels (Oleśnica). In 1884 the duchy was incorporated into Prussia, itself part of Germany since the 1871 Prussian-led unification of Germany.

=== 20th century ===
After World War I, Oels was included within the Province of Lower Silesia. Nazi Germany operated a prison in the town, and a forced labour camp for Italian, English, Yugoslavian, Belgian and Polish prisoners of war during World War II. Dozens of Polish resistance members, including women, were held in the local prison, and at least 14 were sentenced to death in the town in 1942. The German administration evacuated almost the entire population, leaving only a few Germans and the forced laborers. The battle for the town took place between January 21st and 25th 1945, the town was heavily damaged by the Red Army, having approximately 60-80% of its buildings destroyed - most of them after the town had been captured, due to arson. The city became part of Poland again after the Potsdam Conference under its historic Polish name Oleśnica. The remaining German-speaking population was subsequently expelled in accordance to the Potsdam Agreement and the town was resettled with Poles many of whom were expelled from former eastern Poland annexed in 1945 by the Soviet Union. Some 3,000 Italians remained in the town until the end of 1945, and organized artistic shows to which they invited young Polish activists.

Until the mid-1950s, no major reconstruction was undertaken, with the city merely being cleared of rubble. A significant reconstruction of monuments in the Old Town took place in the 1960s, with many of the surviving German monuments being repurposed to fit the new Polish reality. For example, the Victory Column, which stands in front of the town hall, was originally built in 1873, to commemorate Prussia's victory over France in the Franco-Prussian War. The monument was decorated with inscriptions Wir sind eining Volk und Brüder (We are united people and brothers). The monument had survived the war unscathed, however the inscriptions had to be removed, which happened around 1948. In 1964, to commemorate the 20th anniversary of the creation of Polish Committee of National Liberation, plaques were added, however they were subsequently removed, and at present there are no inscriptions on the monument.

== Cuisine ==
The officially protected traditional food of Oleśnica, as designated by the Ministry of Agriculture and Rural Development of Poland, is the Oleśnica wheat and rye gingerbread.

== Sports ==
Football club Pogoń Oleśnica is based in the town. It played at the Polish second division in the 1990s.

== Notable people ==
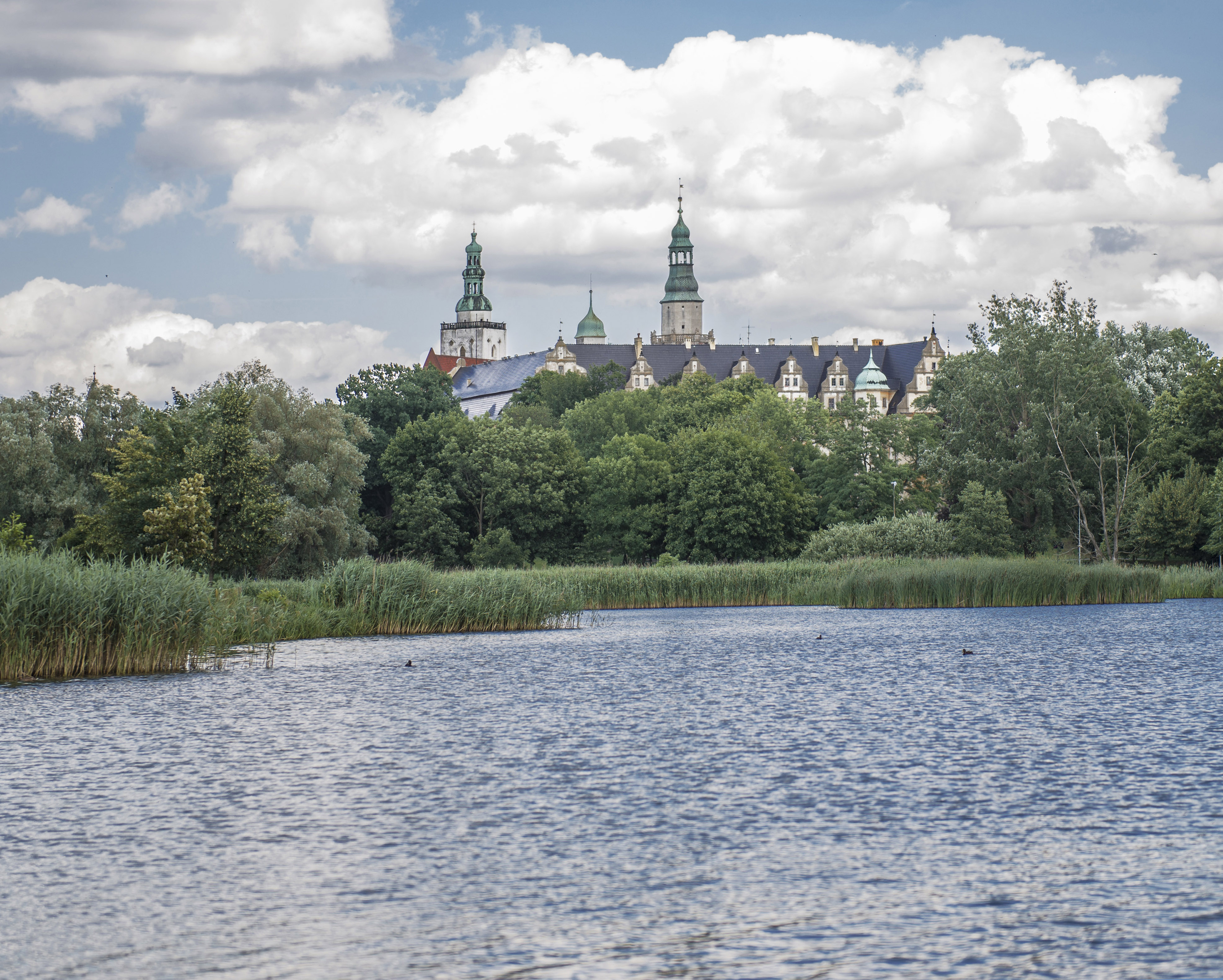
Park of the Dukes of Oleśnica (Park Książąt Oleśnickich)

- Joachim of Münsterberg-Oels (1503–1562), Duke of Münsterberg and from 1536 to 1542 also Duke of Oels
- Hedwig of Münsterberg-Oels (1508–1531), Margravine of Brandenburg-Ansbach-Kulmbach
- John, Duke of Münsterberg-Oels (1509–1565), Duke of the Münsterberg from 1542 to 1565, Duke of Oels from 1548 to 1565 and Duke of Bernstadt from 1548 to 1565
- George II, Duke of Münsterberg-Oels (1512–1553), Duke of Münsterberg from 1536 to 1542 and Duke of Oels
- Henry III, Duke of Münsterberg-Oels (1542–1587), Duke of Münsterberg from 1565 to 1574 and Duke of Bernstadt
- Karl II, Duke of Münsterberg-Oels (1545–1617), Duke of Oels from 1565 to 1617 and Duke of Bernstadt from 1604 to 1617
- Karl Christoph, Duke of Münsterberg (1545–1569), Duke of Münsterberg from 1565 to 1569
- Henry Wenceslaus, Duke of Oels-Bernstadt (1592–1639)
- Abraham von Franckenberg (1593–1652), mystic, born in nearby Bystre
- Karl Friedrich I, Duke of Münsterberg-Oels (1593–1647), Duke of Oels from 1617 to 1647 and Duke of Bernstadt from 1639 to 1647
- Elisabeth Marie, Duchess of Oels (1625–1686), German noblewoman
- Christian Ulrich I, Duke of Württemberg-Oels (1652–1704), German nobleman, Duke of Württemberg-Bernstadt from 1669 to 1697 and Duke of Oels-Württemberg from 1697 until his death
- Julius Siegmund, Duke of Württemberg-Juliusburg (1653–1684), was Duke of Württemberg-Juliusburg
- Eugen of Württemberg (1788–1857), general
- Carl Heinrich Zöllner (1792–1836), German composer
- Julius Hübner (1806–1882), painter
- Gustav Becker (1819–1885), clockmaker
- Willy Hellpach (1877–1955), physicist and politician
- Antoni Cieszyński (1882–1941), surgeon
- Werner Krolikowski (born 1928), East German politician
- Sigmar Polke (1941–2010), artist
- Piotr Czech (born 1986), kicker for Pittsburgh Steelers
- Wojciech Bartnik (born 1967), boxer, Olympic bronze medallist
- Kasia Glowicka (born 1977), composer
- Jerzy Rogalski (born 1948), film and theatre actor
- Rafał Dębski (born 1969), Polish writer
- Babatunde Aiyegbusi (born 1989), Polish-Nigerian professional wrestler and former American football player

== Twin towns – sister cities ==
Oleśnica is twinned with:

- Chrudim, Czech Republic
- Jaunay-Marigny, France
- Warendorf, Germany

== Gallery ==
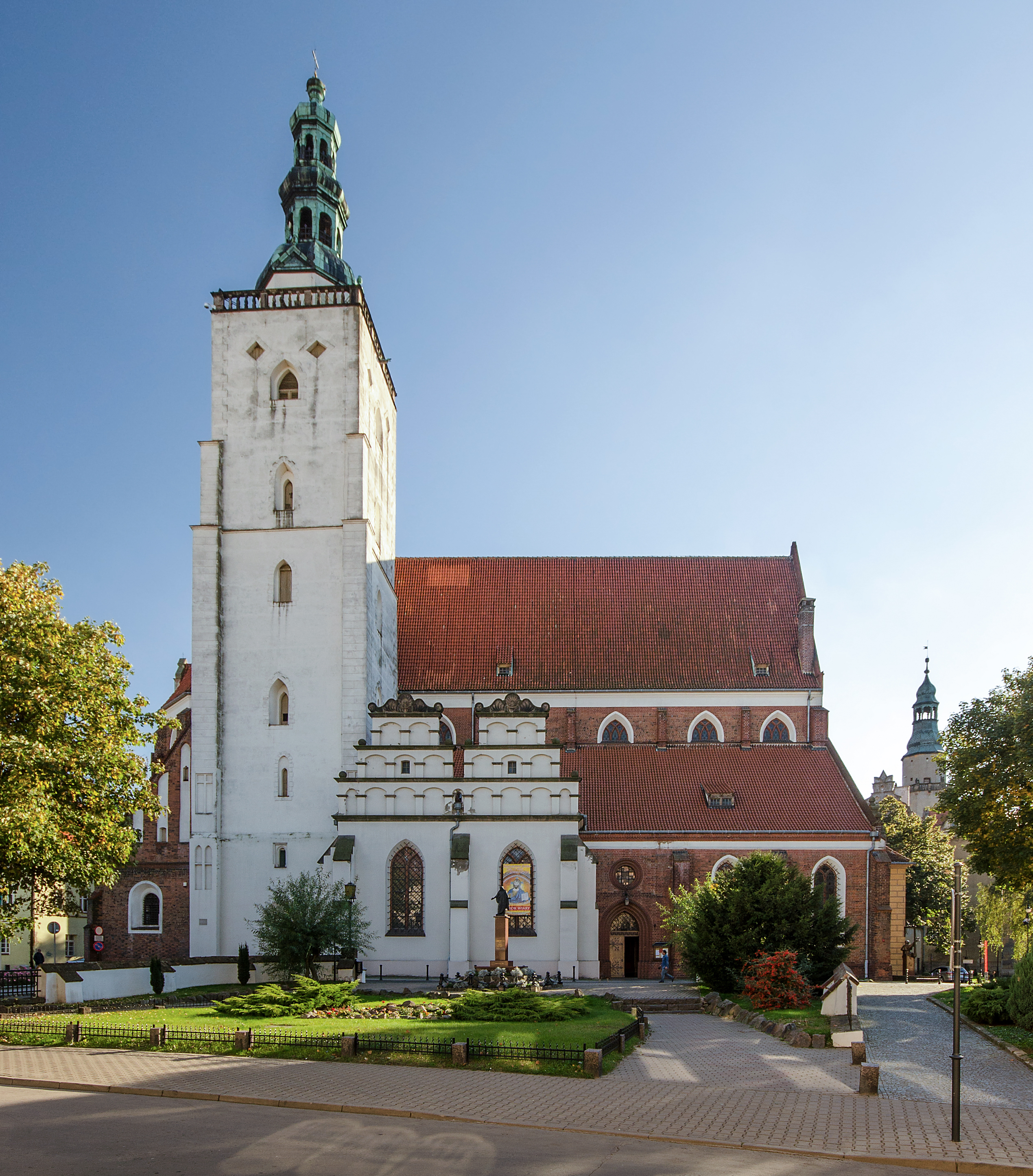
Saint John the Evangelist Basilica

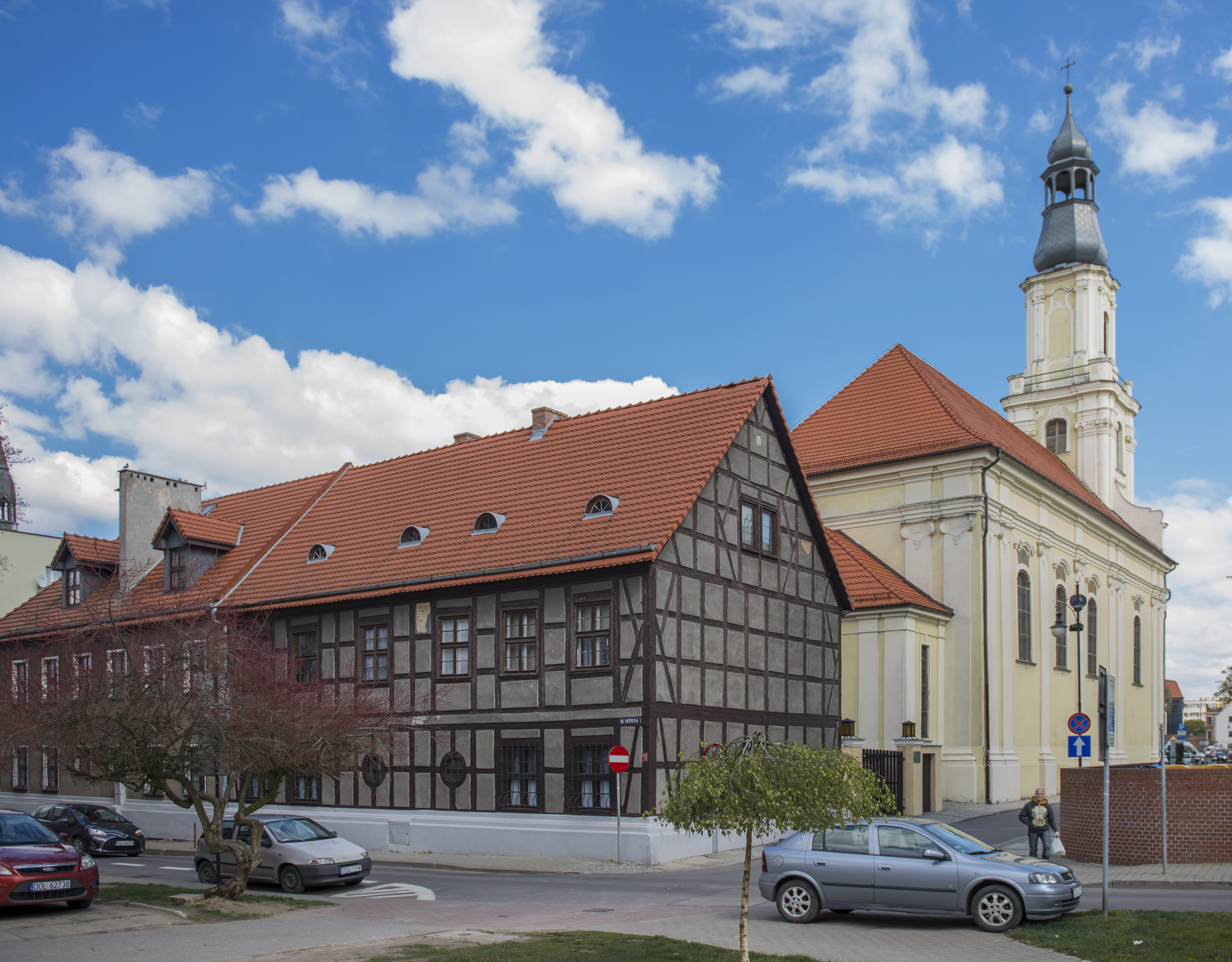
A timber-framed house and the Holy Trinity Church

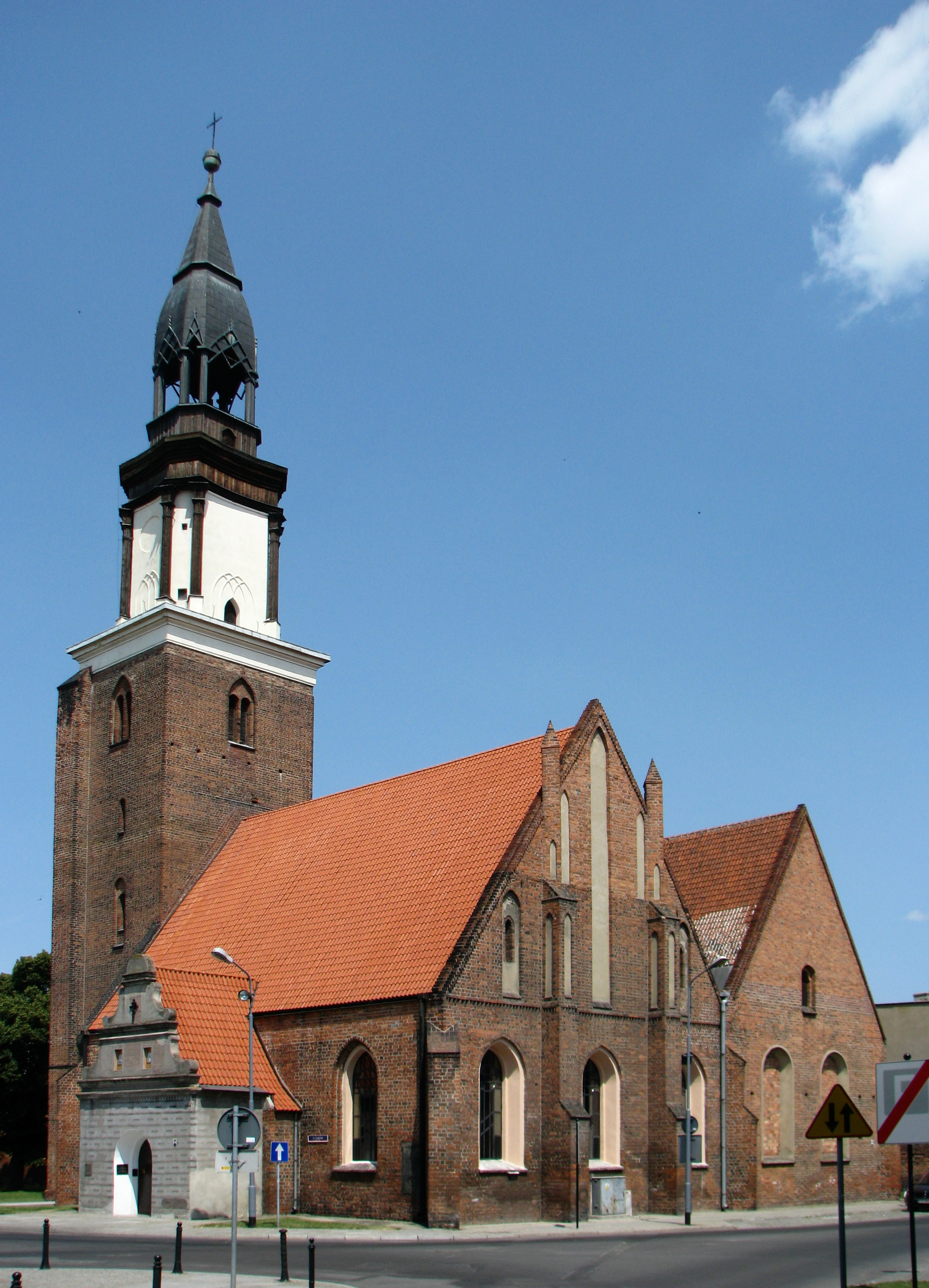
Holy Virgin Mary Church

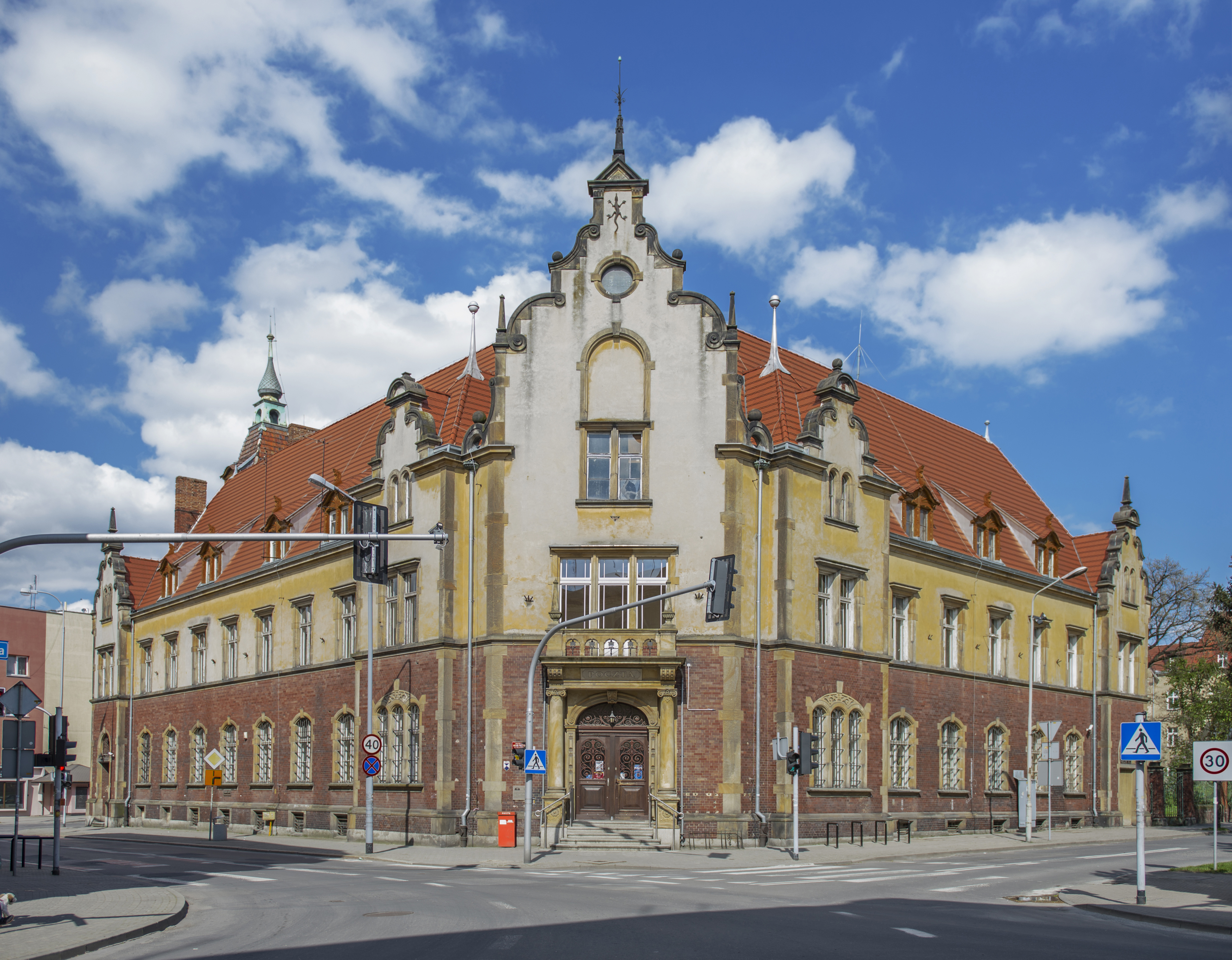
Main post office

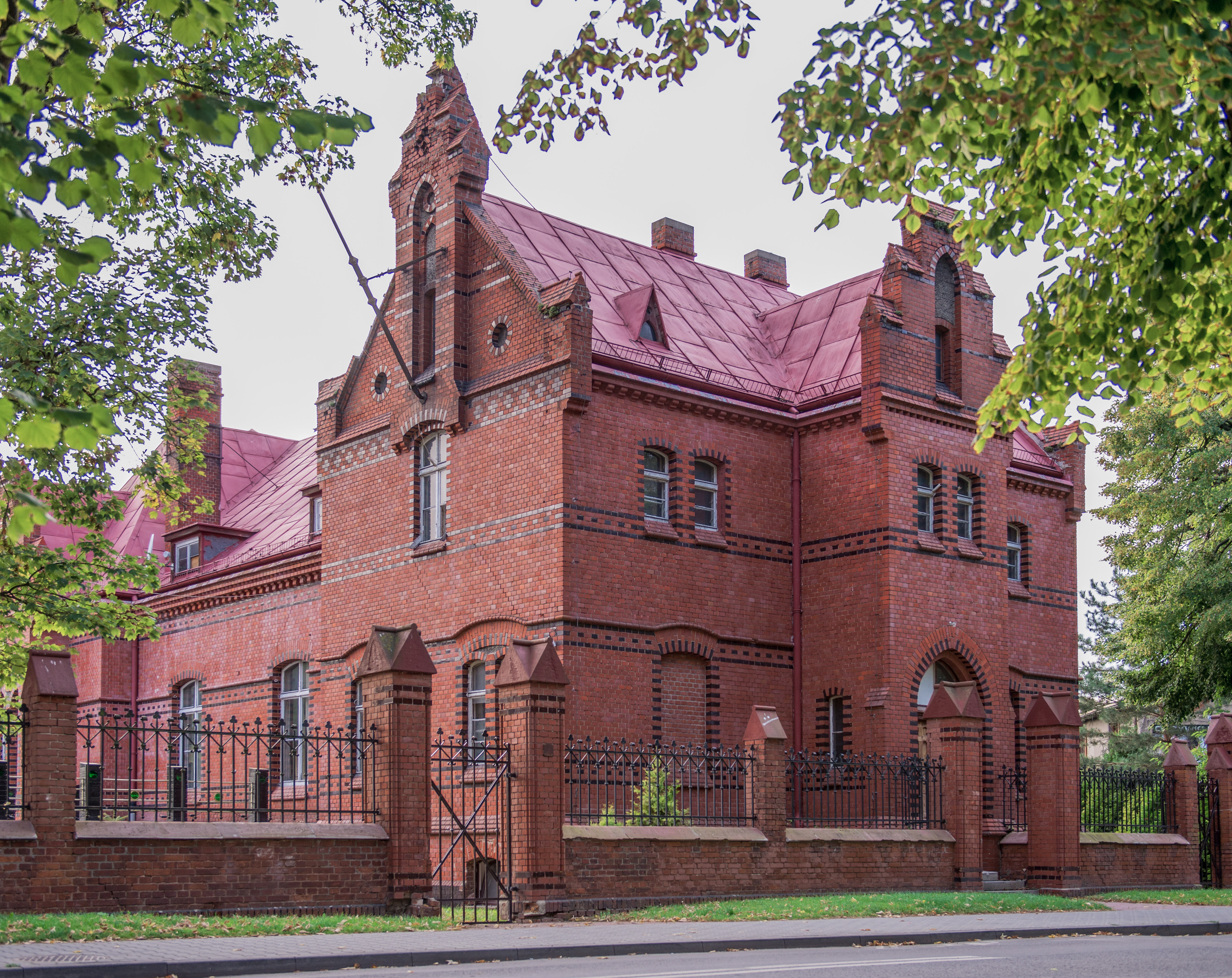
Former Officers' Mess

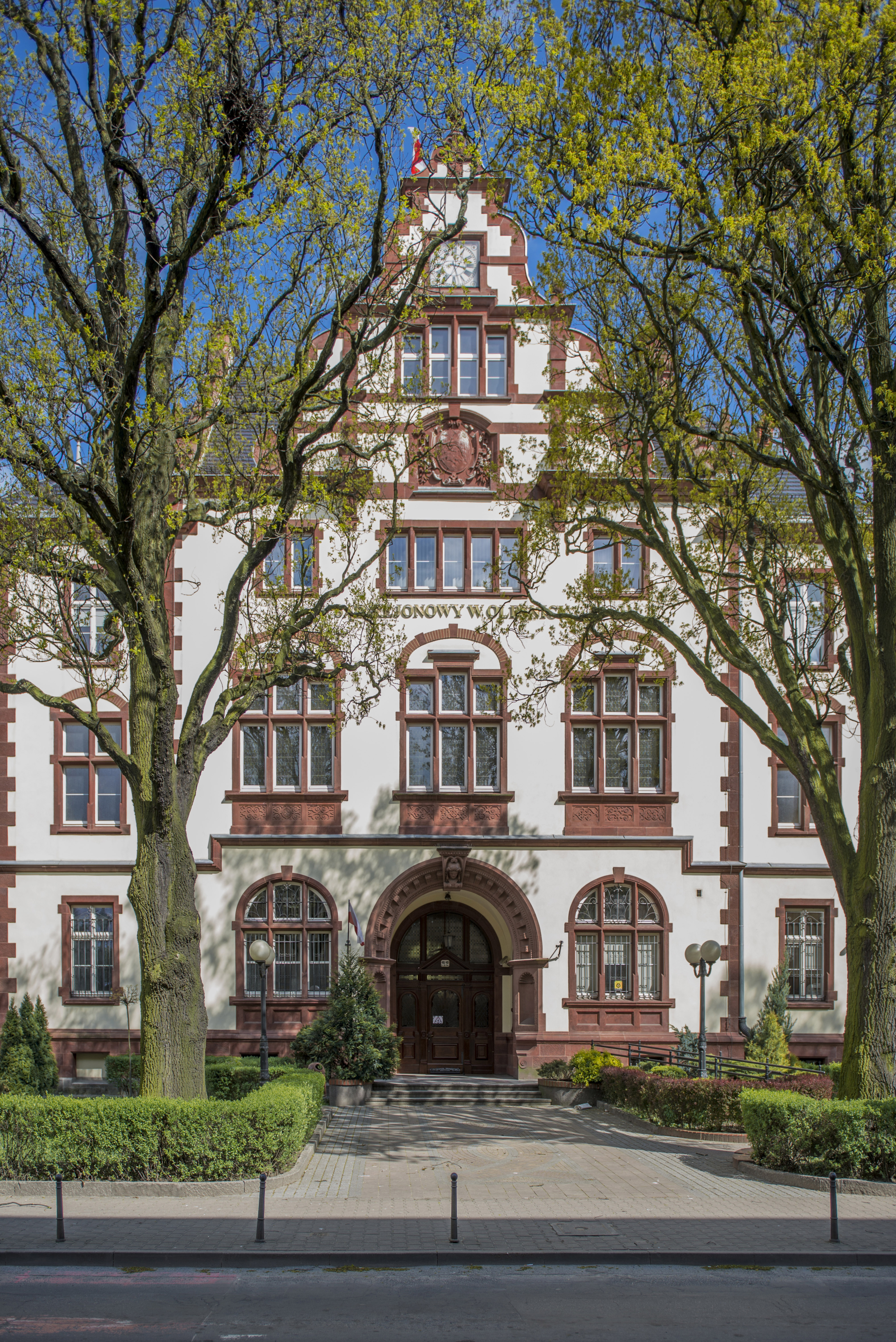
District court

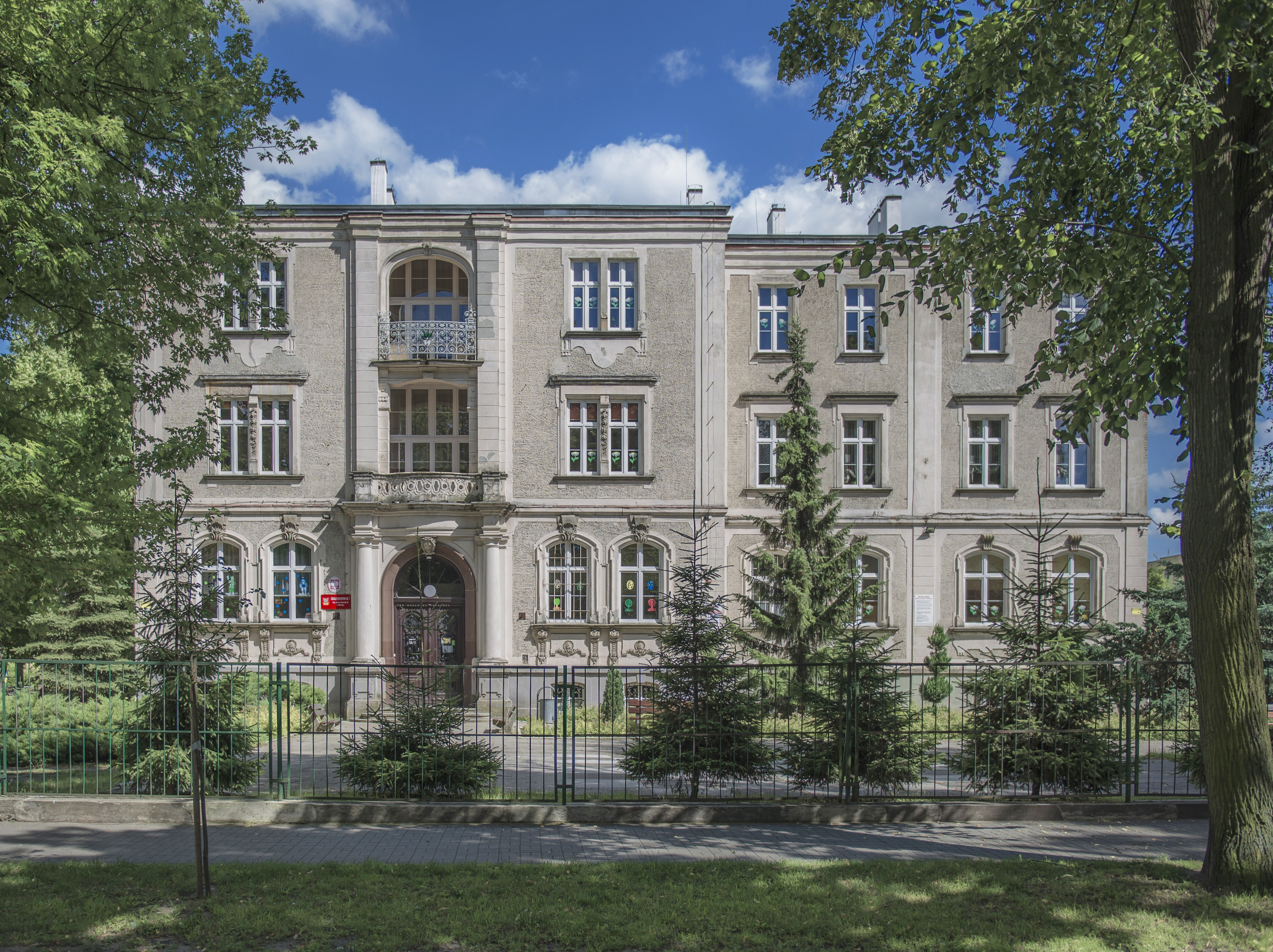
Elementary school no. 7

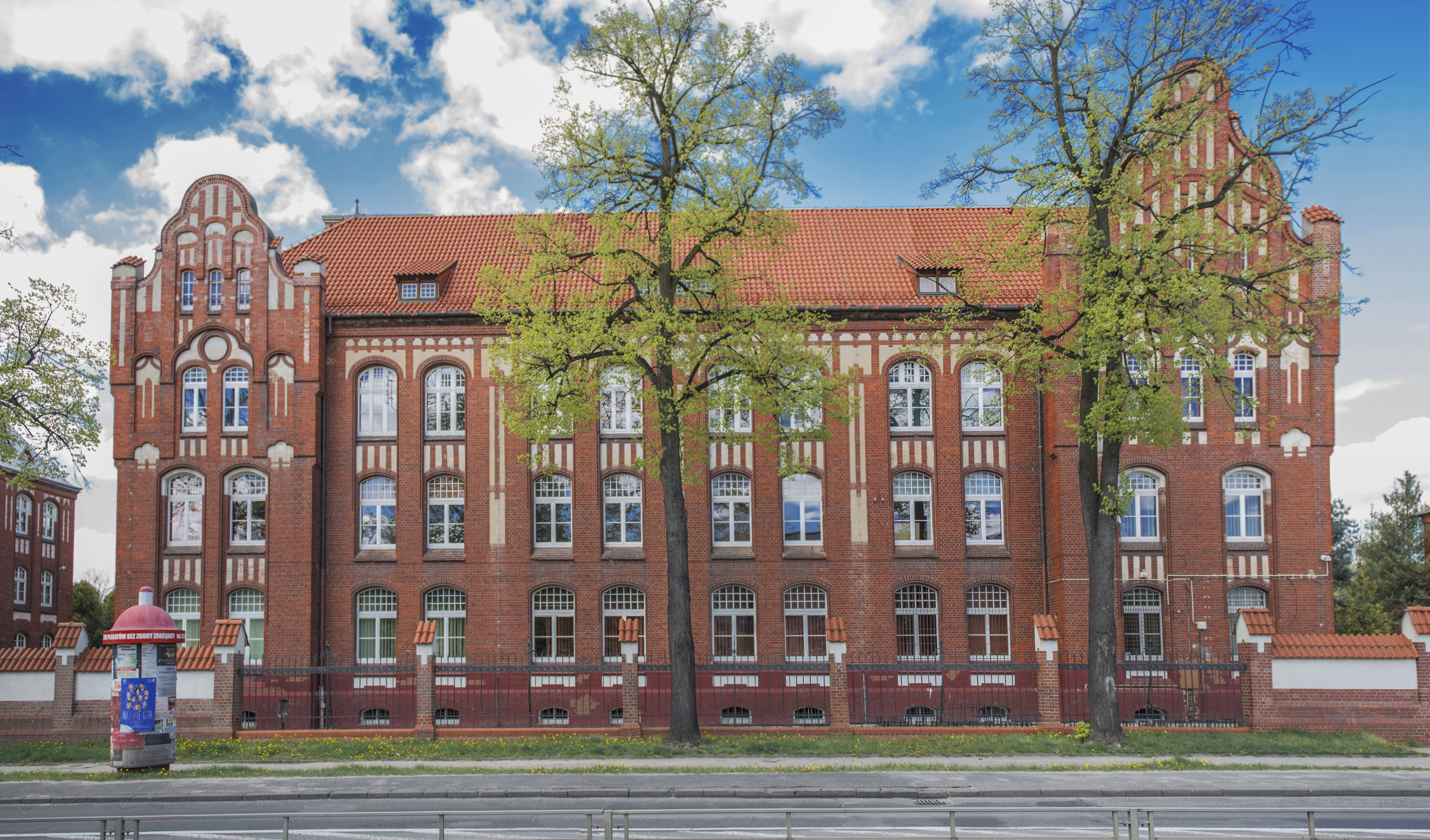
Liceum Ogólnokształcące no. 2 (high school)

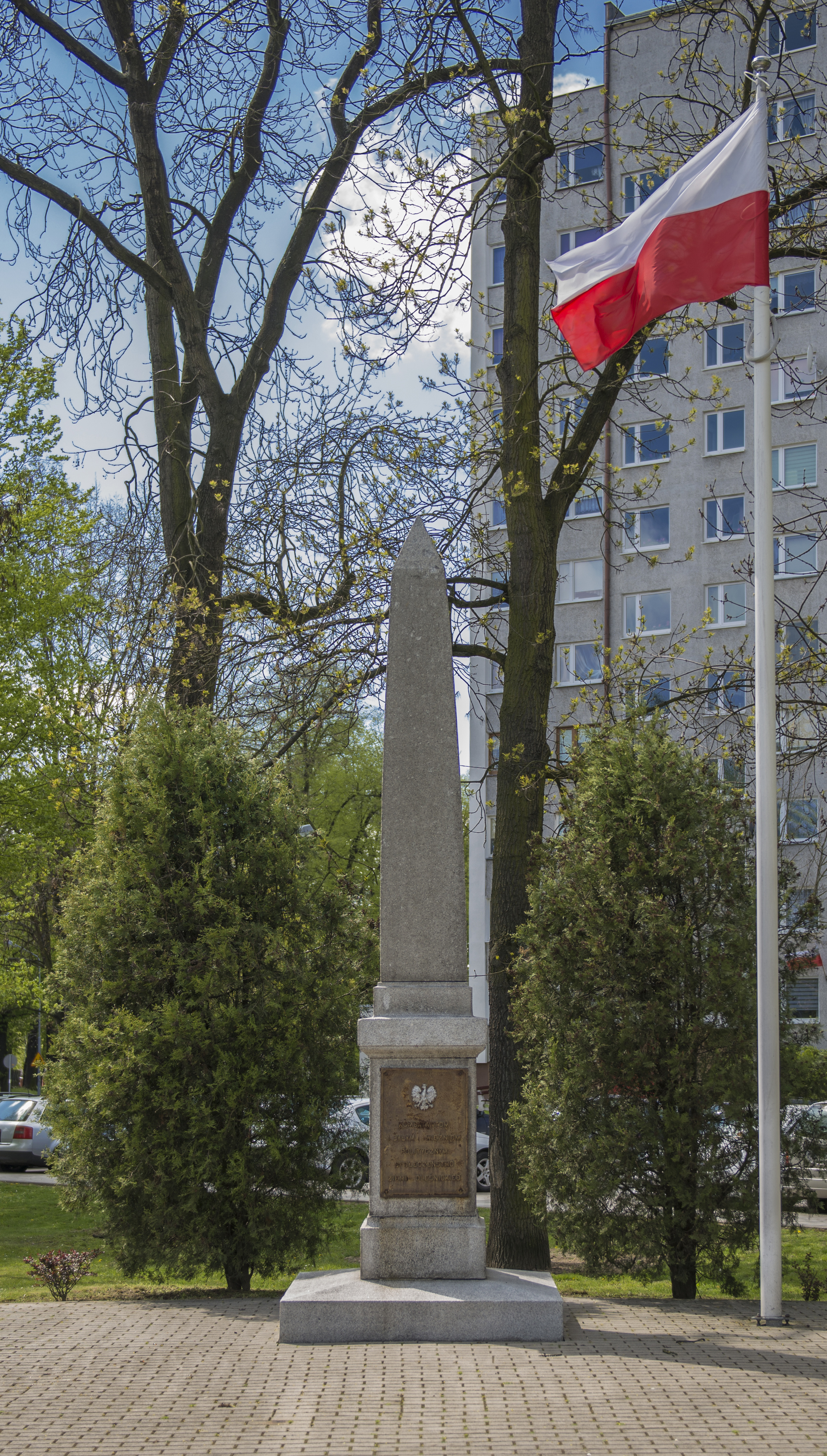
The Polish Veteran's Memorial

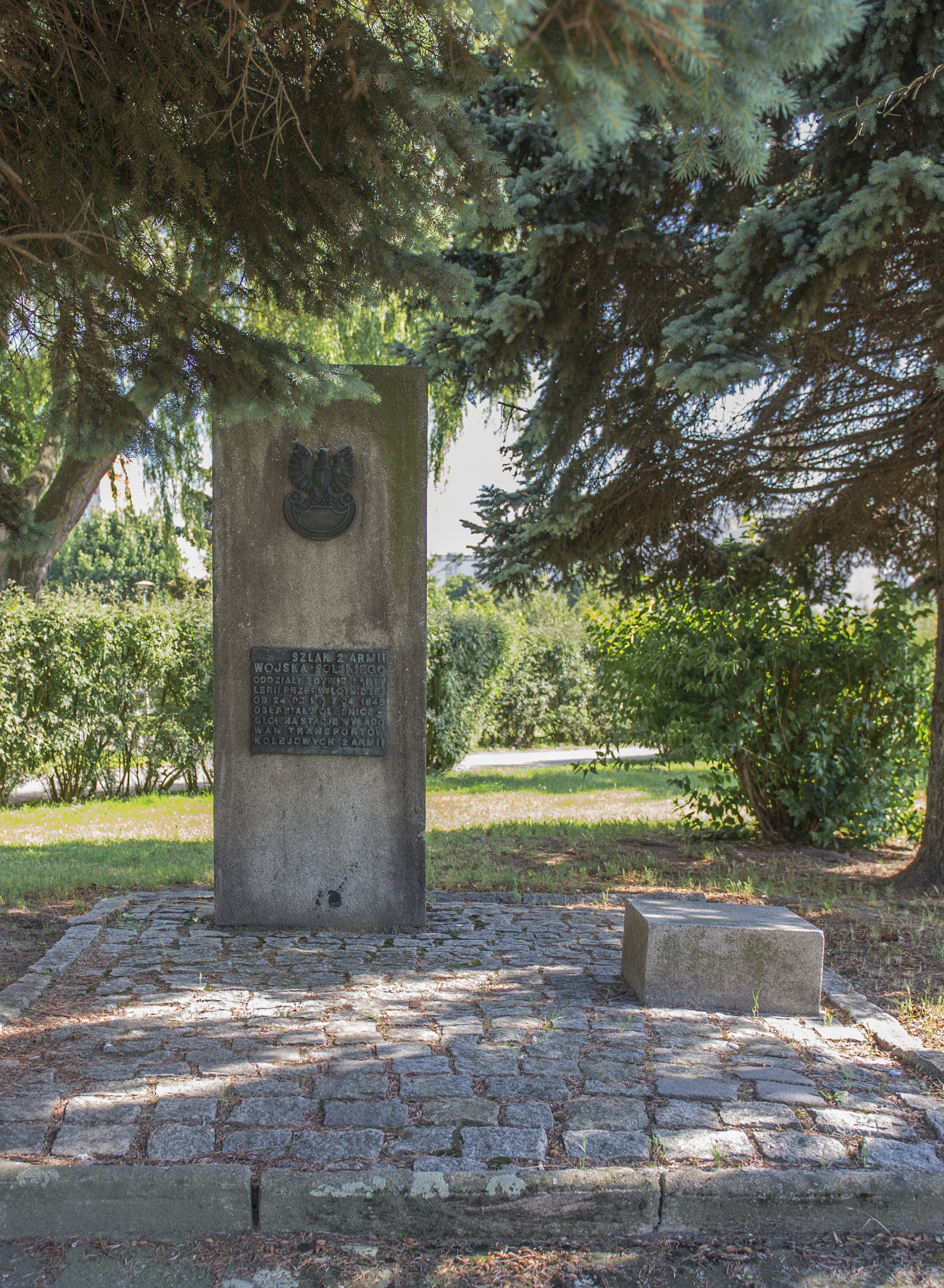
Polish Second Army Memorial

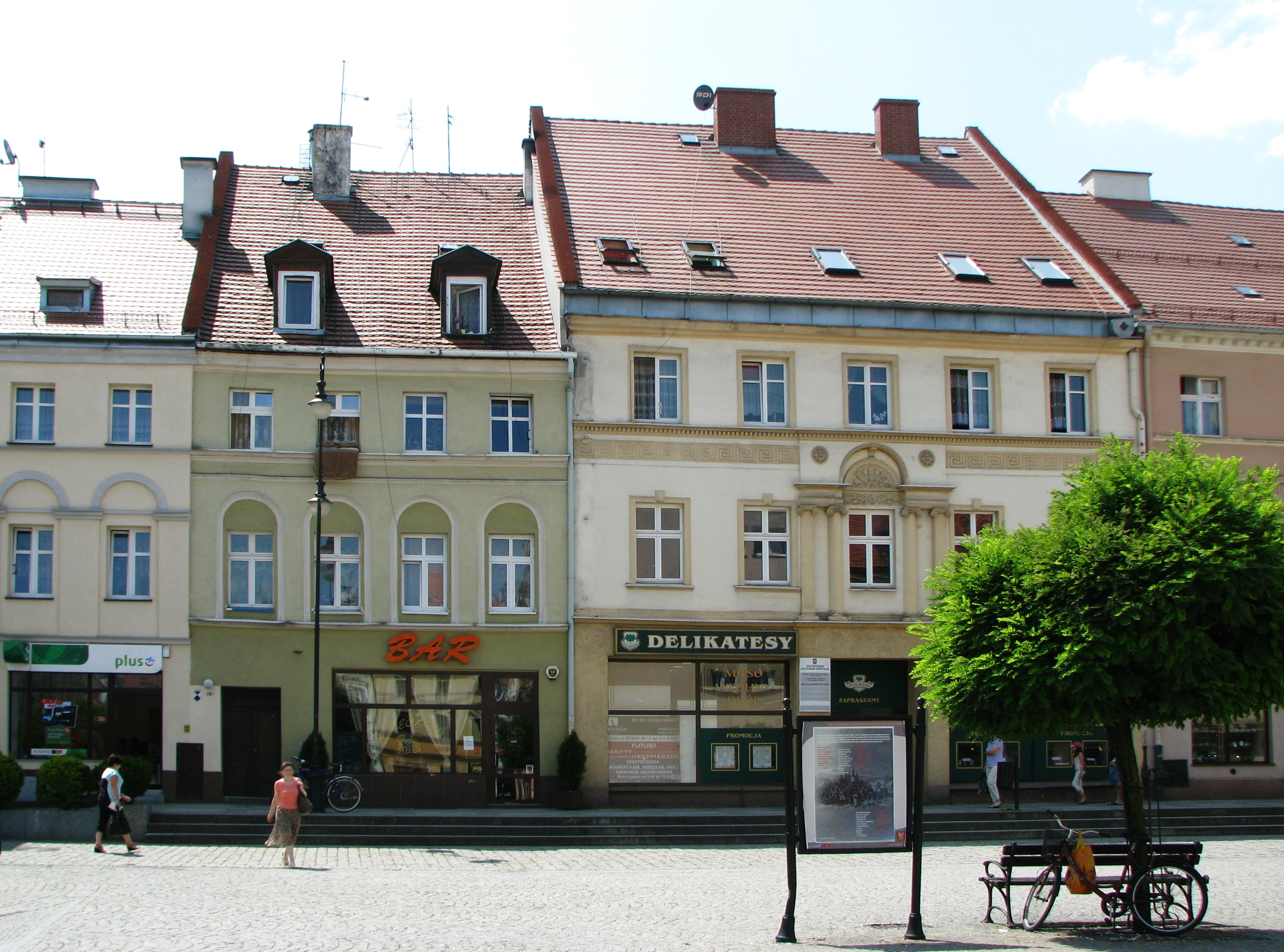
Old townhouses at the Market Square

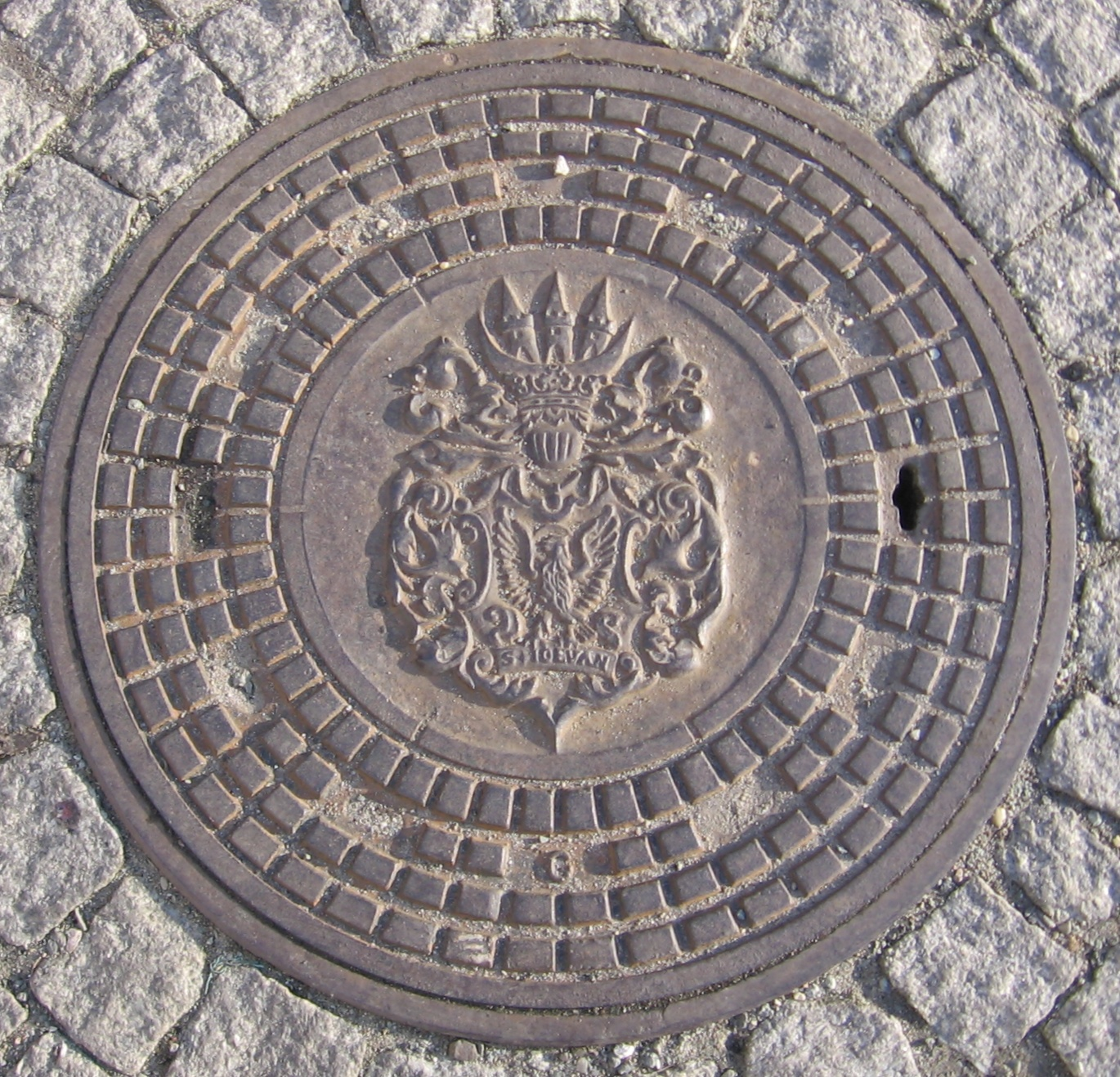
Manhole cover with the Oleśnica coat of arms
