= Ultraviolet (2017 TV series) =

Polish television series

- Genre: Crime
- Created by: Wendy West
- Based on: The Skeleton Crew by Deborah Halber
- Starring: Marta Nieradkiewicz; Agata Kulesza; Sebastian Fabijański; Bartłomiej Topa
- Country of origin: Poland
- Original language: Polish
- No. of seasons: 2
- No. of episodes: 22

Production
- Executive producers: Barry Josephson; Wendy West
- Running time: 45 minutes
- Production companies: Opus TV; Polish Film Institute (season 2); Josephson Entertainment; Sony Pictures Television (season 1); Sony Pictures Television Networks Original (season 2)

Original release
- Network: AXN
- Release: 25 October 2017 – present

Ultraviolet is a Polish television series starring Marta Nieradkiewicz, Agata Kulesza and Sebastian Fabijański. The plot revolves around a thirty-year-old woman (Ola Serafin) who has to move back to her hometown of Łódź. After observing a suspicious incident one night, she decides to join a group of online amateur detectives who work on unsolved cases.

The first season premiered on 25 October 2017 on AXN. A second season was released on 2 October 2019. The theme song was written and performed by Wojtek Urbański and Justyna Święs. The first season was nominated for the Best TV CEE Series award at the Serial Killer festival.

== Premise ==
The series begins when Aleksandra, a part-time Uber driver, witnesses the murder of a young woman. The police seem apathetic about the case, believing it to be a suicide. So she seeks help from a group of amateur investigators known as Ultraviolet (UV), so called because violet sees more than blue (meaning the police). The members of UV communicate though the internet and use computer related technology to obtain clues; each member having their own area of expertise. Aleksandra joins UV and the series follows her as she and UV solve crimes that the police are unable to handle. Meanwhile, the police actively try to restrict UV's activities.

== Cast and characters ==
- Marta Nieradkiewicz as Aleksandra "Ola" Serafin-Łozińska
- Agata Kulesza as Anna Serafin
- Sebastian Fabijański as Michał Holender
- Bartłomiej Topa as Waldemar Kraszewski
- Viet Anh Do as Huan Nguyen "Piast Kołodziej"
- Karolina Chapko as Dorota Polańska
- Paulina Chapko as Regina Polańska
- Magdalena Czerwińska as Beata Misiak
- Marek Kalita as Henryk Bąk
- Michał Żurawski as Tomasz Molak
- Katarzyna Cynke as Grażyna Molak

== Episodes ==
Series	Episodes	Originally released	
Series	Episodes	First released	Last released
1	10	25 October 2017	20 December 2017
2	12	2 October 2019	18 December 2019

=== Season 1 (2017) ===
No. overall	No. in season	Title	Directed by	Written by	Original release date
1	1	"#ladyofthelake"	Unknown	Unknown	25 October 2017
2	2	"#alicja"	Unknown	Unknown	1 November 2017
3	3	"#explosion"	Unknown	Unknown	8 November 2017
4	4	"#elias"	Unknown	Unknown	15 November 2017
5	5	"#masterlevel"	Unknown	Unknown	22 November 2017
6	6	"#confession"	Unknown	Unknown	29 November 2017
7	7	"#limbo"	Unknown	Unknown	6 December 2017
8	8	"#theclub"	Unknown	Unknown	13 December 2017
9	9	"#hycel"	Unknown	Unknown	20 December 2017
10	10	"#strangeland"	Unknown	Unknown	20 December 2017

=== Season 2 (2019) ===
No. overall	No. in season	Title	Directed by	Written by	Original release date
11	1	TBA	Bartosz Prokopowicz	Unknown	2 October 2019
12	2	TBA	Bartosz Prokopowicz	Unknown	9 October 2019
13	3	TBA	Bartosz Prokopowicz	Unknown	16 October 2019
14	4	TBA	Bartosz Prokopowicz	Unknown	23 October 2019
15	5	TBA	Bartosz Prokopowicz	Unknown	30 October 2019
16	6	TBA	Bartosz Prokopowicz	Unknown	6 November 2019
17	7	TBA	Bartosz Prokopowicz	Unknown	13 November 2019
18	8	TBA	Bartosz Prokopowicz	Unknown	20 November 2019
19	9	TBA	Bartosz Prokopowicz	Unknown	27 November 2019
20	10	TBA	Bartosz Prokopowicz	Unknown	4 December 2019
21	11	TBA	Bartosz Prokopowicz	Unknown	11 December 2019
22	12	TBA	Bartosz Prokopowicz	Unknown	18 December 2019

== Release ==
Ultraviolet was released on 25 October 2017 on AXN.
