= Mateusz Banasiuk =

Polish film and television actor (born 1985)

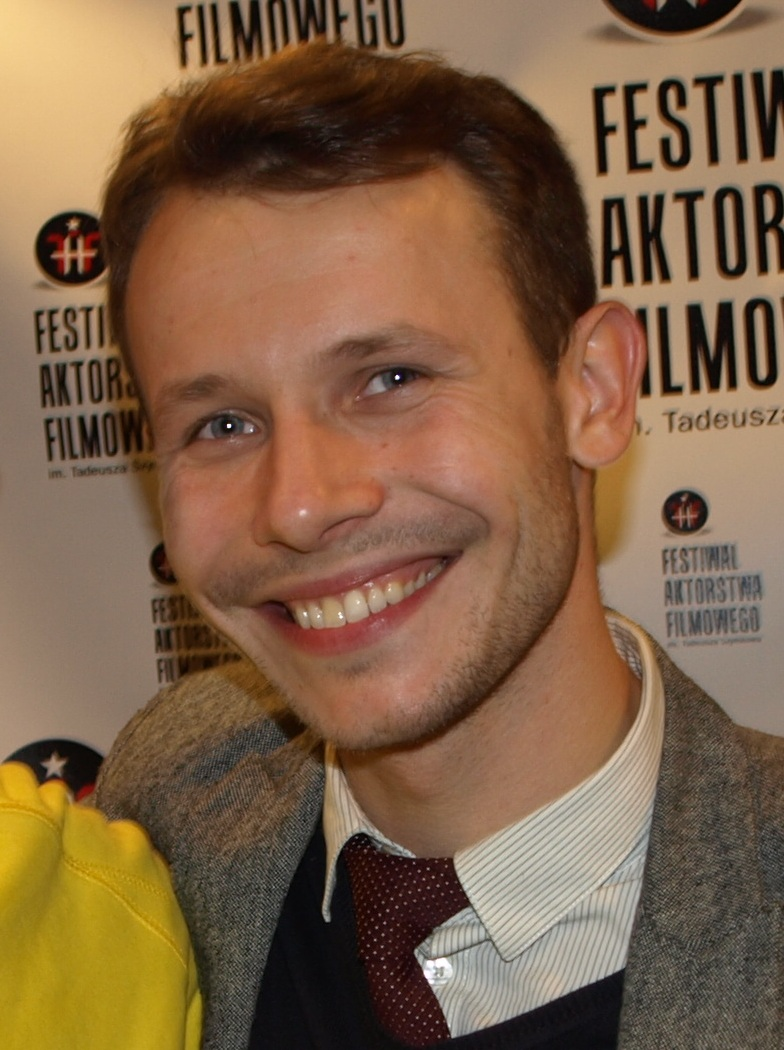
- Banasiuk in 2013
- Born: 21 September 1985 (age 40); Warsaw, Poland
- Occupation: Actor
- Years active: 2004–present

Mateusz Banasiuk is a Polish actor. In 2024, Banasiuk appeared in the dark romantic comedy Kill Me If You Dare, directed by Filip Zylber. The film follows a couple whose marriage takes a twisted turn after winning the lottery, leading to a series of darkly humorous events.
