= Sibyllenort =

Sibyllenort may refer to:

- Sibyllenort, former German name of Szczodre, a village in Poland
- Sibyllenort Palace, a former palace in Sibyllenort, near Wroclaw
