= Princess Marie of Baden, Duchess of Brunswick-Wolfenbüttel =

Duchess of Brunswick-Wolfenbüttel from 1806 to 1807

Marie of Baden
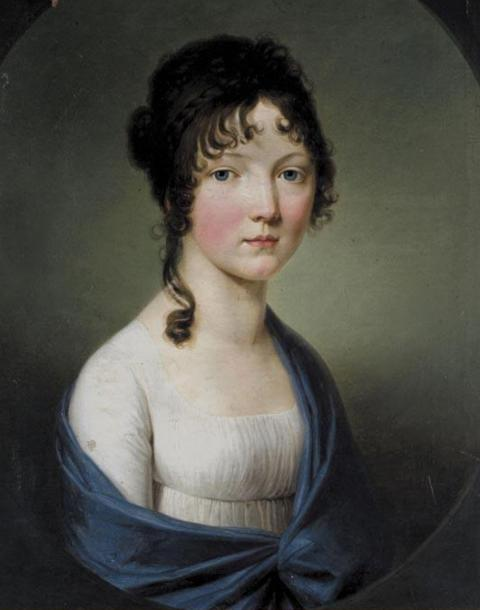
- 1801 portrait

Duchess consort of Brunswick-Wolfenbüttel
- Tenure: 16 October 1806 – 8 July 1807
- Born: 7 September 1782; Karlsruhe
- Died: 20 April 1808 (aged 25); Bruchsal
- Spouse: Frederick William, Duke of Brunswick-Wolfenbüttel (m. 1802)
- Issue More…: Charles II, Duke of Brunswick; William, Duke of Brunswick
- House: Zähringen
- Father: Charles Louis, Hereditary Prince of Baden
- Mother: Landgravine Amalie of Hesse-Darmstadt

Marie of Baden (Marie Elisabeth Wilhelmine; 7 September 1782 – 20 April 1808) was Duchess of Brunswick-Wolfenbüttel and Brunswick-Oels. She was married to Frederick William, Duke of Brunswick-Wolfenbüttel.

== Biography ==
Marie Elisabeth Wilhelmine was the seventh child and fifth daughter of Charles Louis, Hereditary Prince of Baden and his wife, Landgravine Amalie of Hesse-Darmstadt.

Marie was born in Karlsruhe. At the time of the war against France, she stayed at Prenzlau. In 1806, her father-in-law fled from the troops of Napoleon to Altona, where he died of the wounds he sustained in the war against France. Marie and her mother-in-law, Princess Augusta of Great Britain, came to see him at his sick-bed, but when the French army headed toward Hamburg, they were advised by the British ambassador to flee, and left shortly before his death. They were both invited to Sweden by Marie's brother-in-law king Gustav IV Adolf of Sweden. Augusta preferred to stay with her niece, Louise Augusta of Denmark in Augustenburg, but Marie accepted the offer and joined the king and queen of Sweden with her children at Malmö, where the royal family stayed without ceremony and much court life at the time to be close to the warfront during the unstable political situation. Her spouse was granted permission by the emperor to stay in Altona.

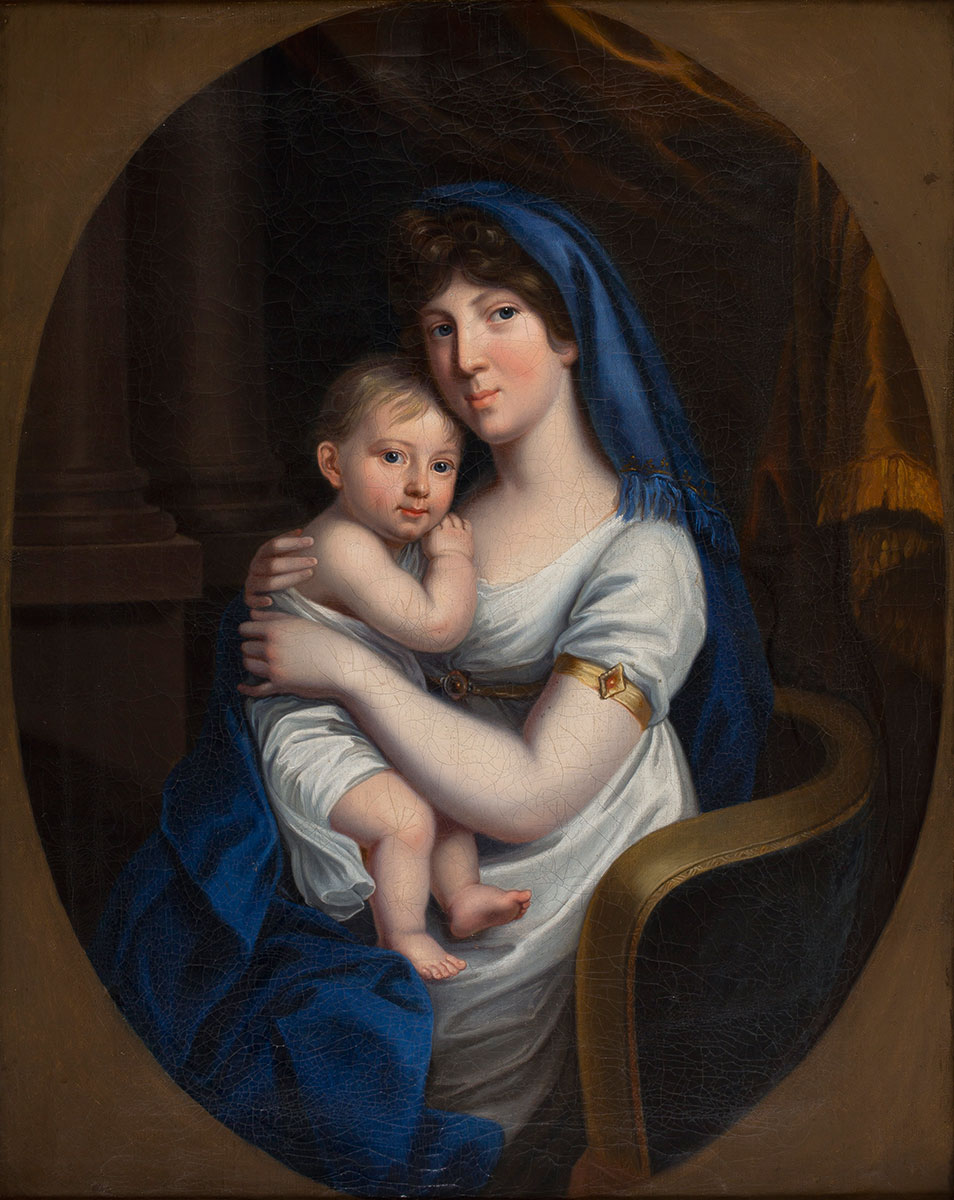
Portrait of Marie and her son Charles by Johann Heinrich Schröder, 1804

Her brother, the Hereditary Prince of Baden, was married to Stephanie de Beauharnais, and an ally of Napoleon, and joined the emperor in Berlin at the same time. Napoleon refused to see Marie's consort but said that he would like to see her, and Marie's brother wrote to her and asked her to come to Napoleon in Berlin as the ambassador of Brunswick to speak on behalf of her husband. She accepted the suggestion and travelled alone toward Berlin, but was stopped in Stralsund on the order of her husband, as it was believed at the time that Napoleon had plans to marry her to his brother Jérôme Bonaparte. Her husband was reportedly genuinely fond of her and visited her incognito in Sweden two times, despite the fact that Sweden was considered enemy territory by Napoleon.

During her stay in Sweden Marie lived with the royal family in Malmö, where they stayed informally during her stay, rather than in state in Stockholm. She was reportedly used to an informal interaction with her ladies-in-waiting and felt restricted in the household of her strict and temperamental brother-in-law the king, with whom she found it difficult to get along. In May 1807, her sister, Queen Frederica, was leaving Malmö and returning to the court at Stockholm to give birth, and asked Marie to come with her, but Marie's husband demanded her to return to Germany, which she did.

== Family ==
On 1 November 1802, in Karlsruhe, Marie married Frederick William, Duke of Brunswick-Wolfenbüttel. Marie had three children before she died at Bruchsal of puerperal fever four days after giving birth to a stillborn daughter.

- Charles (30 October 1804 – 18 August 1873)
- William (25 April 1806 – 18 October 1884)
- Stillborn daughter (b. & d. 16 April 1808 Bruchsal)

== Ancestry ==
Ancestors of Princess Marie of Baden, Duchess of Brunswick-Wolfenbüttel

8. Friedrich, Hereditary Prince of Baden-Durlach
4. Charles Frederick, Grand Duke of Baden
9. Princess Amalia of Nassau-Dietz
2. Charles Louis, Hereditary Prince of Baden
10. Louis VIII, Landgrave of Hesse-Darmstadt
5. Landgravine Karoline Luise of Hesse-Darmstadt
11. Charlotte of Hanau-Lichtenberg
1. Princess Marie of Baden
12. Louis VIII, Landgrave of Hesse-Darmstadt =10
6. Louis IX, Landgrave of Hesse-Darmstadt
13. Charlotte of Hanau-Lichtenberg =11
3. Landgravine Amalie of Hesse-Darmstadt
14. Christian III, Count Palatine of Zweibrücken
7. Countess Palatine Caroline of Zweibrücken
15. Caroline of Nassau-Saarbrücken

== Notes ==
German nobility
Preceded by Princess Augusta of Great Britain	Duchess consort of Brunswick-Wolfenbüttel; 1806–1807	Vacant Title next held by Princess Victoria; Louise of Prussia
