= Sibyllenort Palace =

Former palace in Szczodre, Poland

Coordinates: 51.1955°N 17.1928°E

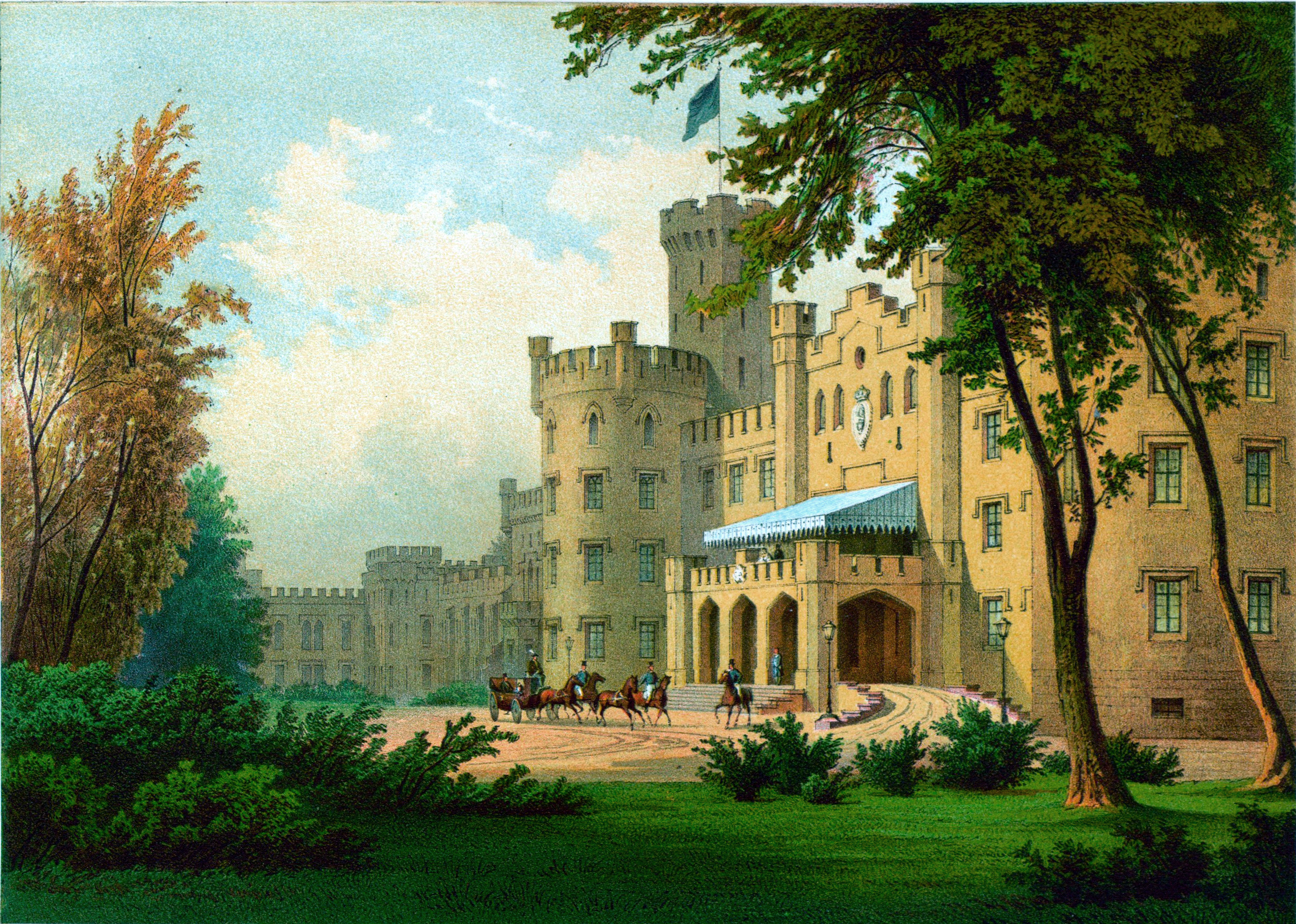
Sibyllenort by Alexander Duncker around 1860

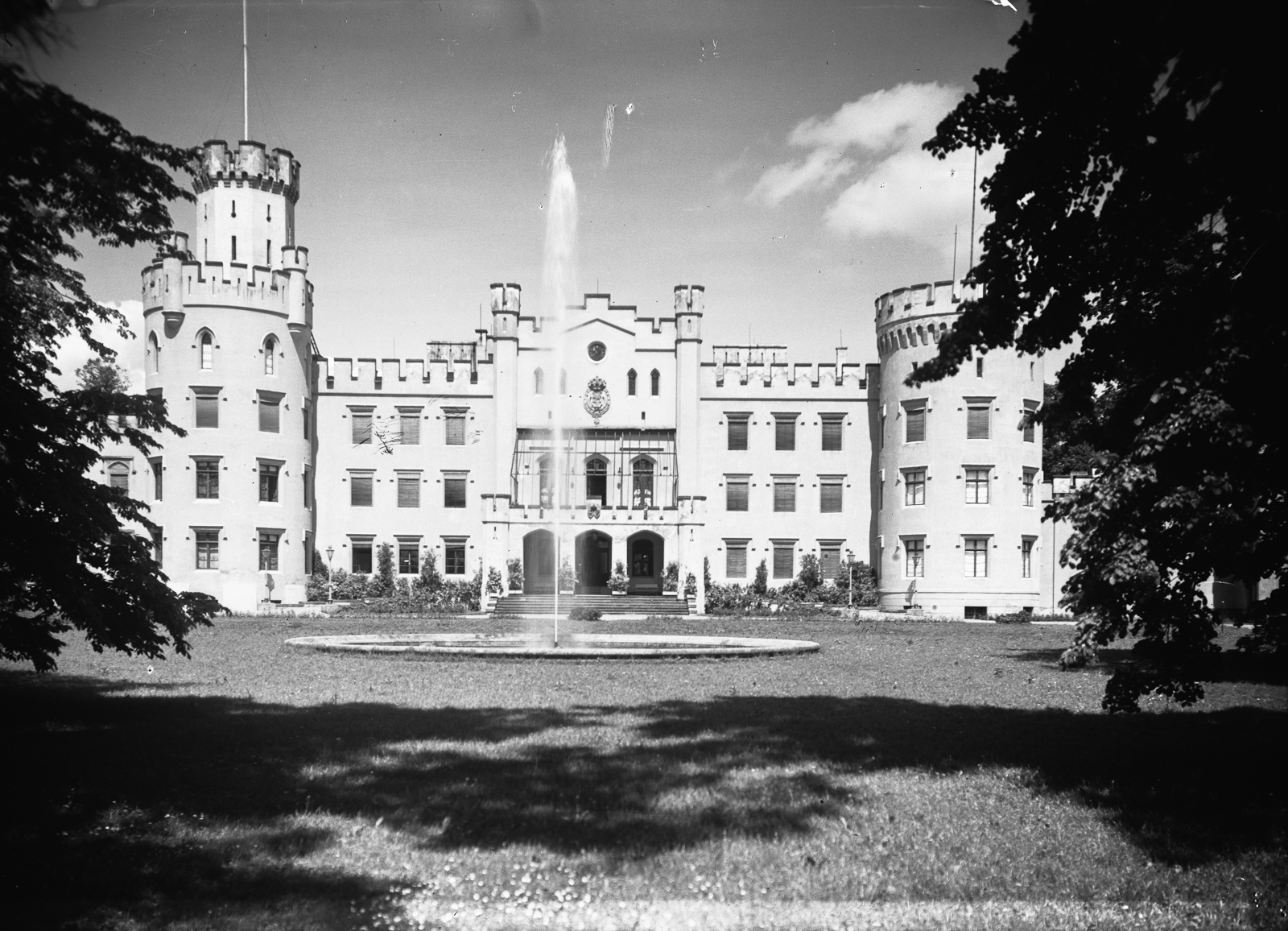
Sibyllenort around 1920–1935

Sibyllenort Palace (German: Schloss Sibyllenort or Polish: Pałac Sybilli) is a former palace in Szczodre, 12 kilometres north-east of Wrocław, Silesia, Poland. It was first the seat of the dukes of Oels, and later the private property of the royal Saxon family. Due to its Tudor style, it was known as the Silesian Windsor. It was destroyed in the last days of the Second World War, by soldiers of either the retreating SS or the Red Army (or both).

Today, only individual remnants of buildings and the park remain in the castle complex.

== History ==
=== House of Württemberg-Oels ===
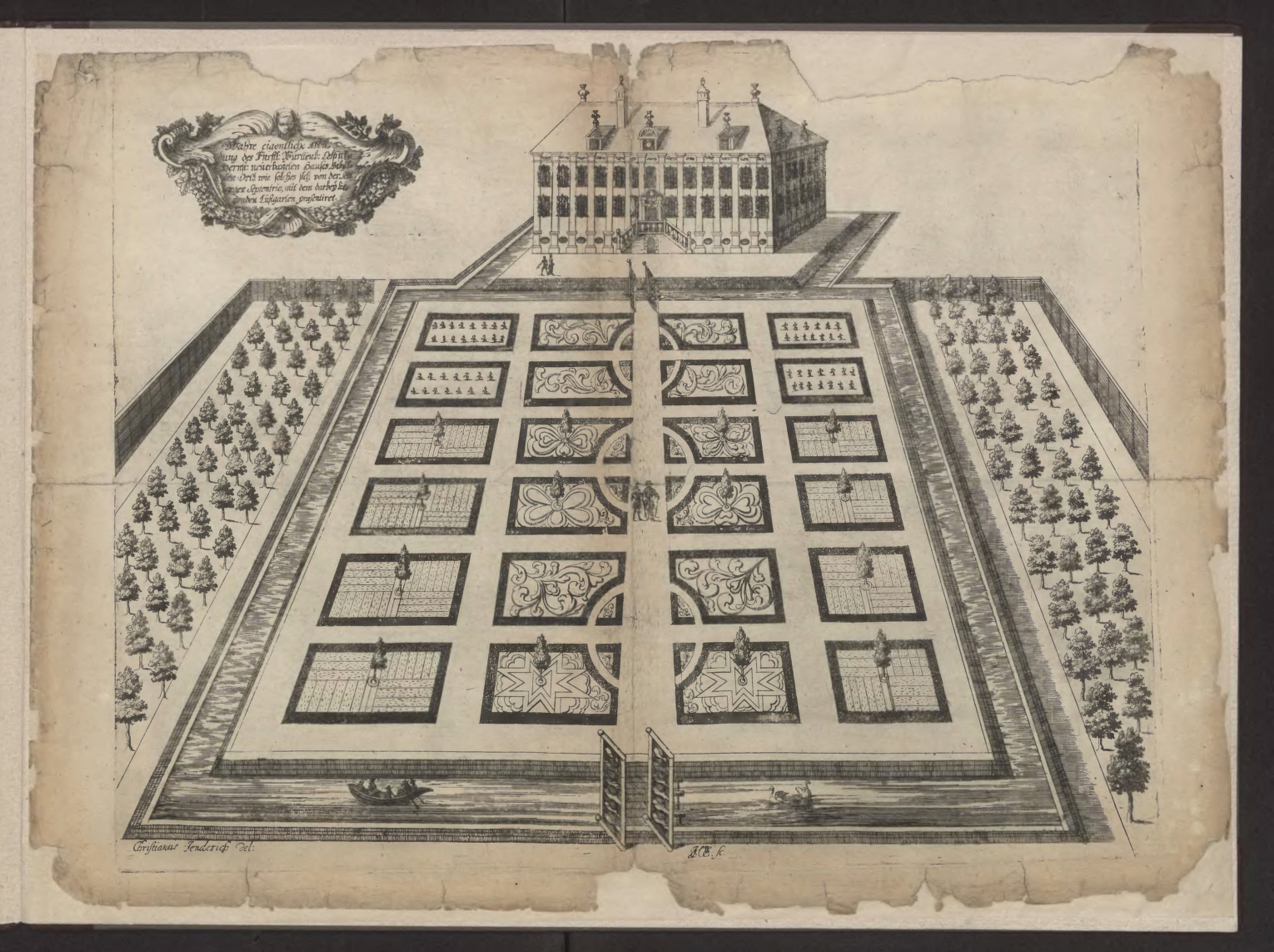
Sibyllenort in 1692

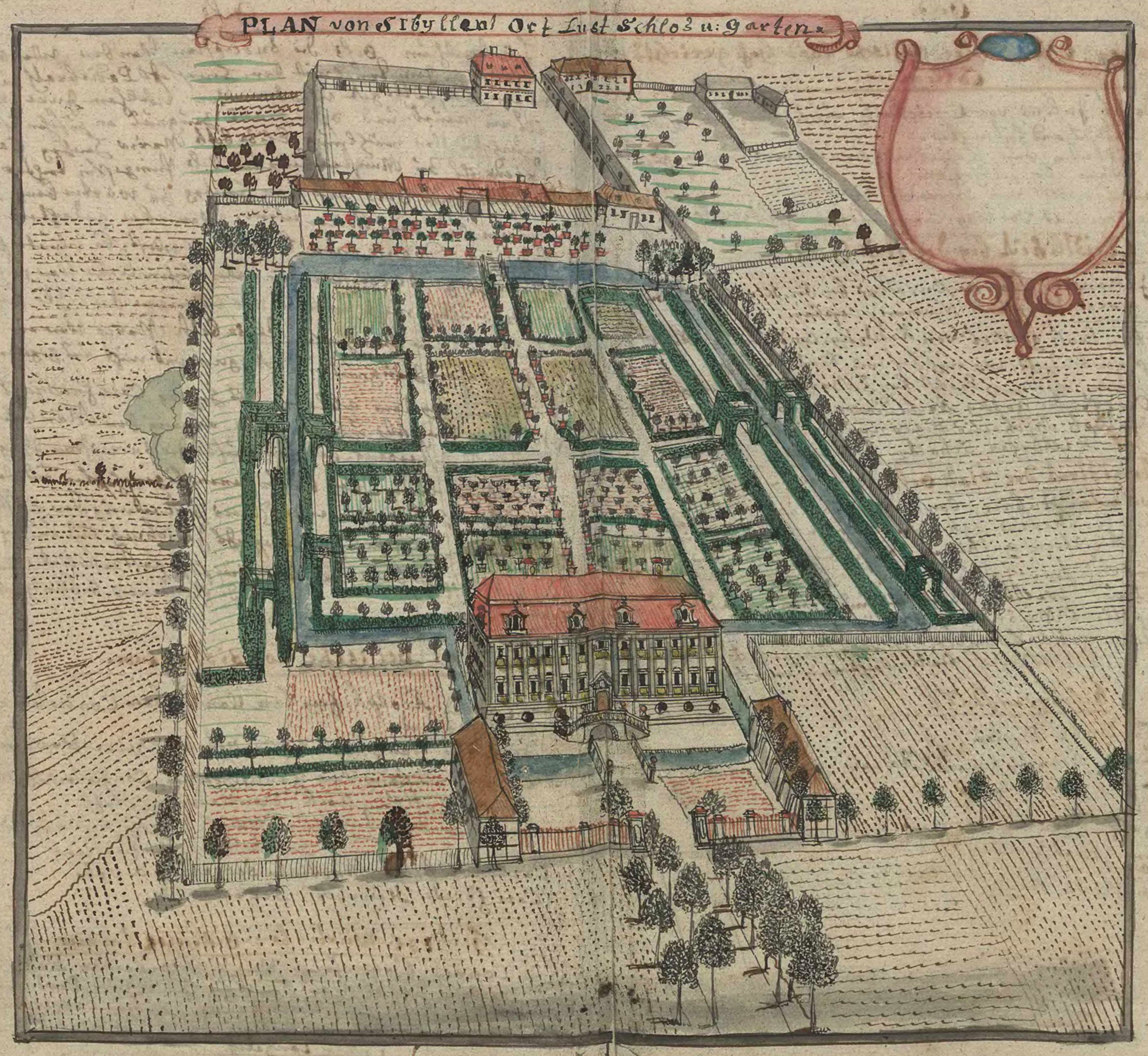
The ruins of Sibyllenort in 1765

The villages of Neudorf and Rastelwitz belonged to the Gaffron family since 1592, with Rastelwitz lying deserted since the Thirty Years' War. In 1685, Balthasar Wilhelm von Gaffron sold them to Christian Ulrich I, Duke of Württemberg-Oels (1652–1704) . From 1685 to 1692, he constructed a summer residence there for his second wife, princess Sibylle Maria of Saxony-Merseburg (1667–1694), after whom he named both the town and the palace, Sibyllenort. The palace consisted of 13 axles with a French garden and was surrounded by a moat.

Christian Ulrich's son, Charles Fredrick II (1690–1761), gifted the palace to his wife, Sibylle Charlotte Juliane of Württemberg (1690–1735), in 1712, who initially leased the property. After the palace was deemed uninhabitable, Sibylle Charlotte renovated it in 1716 and used it as a summer residence until her death in 1735. It then passed to her sister, Hedwig Friederike of Anhalt-Zerbst (1691–1752), before reverting to the dukes of Württemberg-Oels.

Polish kings and Saxon electors Augustus II the Strong (1670–1733) and Augustus III of Poland (1696–1763) visited Sibyllenort, when travelling between their capitals Dresden and Warsaw.

Charles Frederick II's successor and brother, Charles Christian (1716–1792), paid little attention to the palace. He was the last of his line. His daughter, Friederike Sophie Charlotte Auguste (1751–1789), was married to prince Frederick Augustus of Brunswick-Lüneburg (1740–1805), son of Charles I, Duke of Brunswick-Wolfenbüttel (1713–1780). This prince became the inheritor of Schloss Sibyllenort.

=== Duke of Brunswick: duke Frederick Augustus ===
In 1792, the duchy of Oels was granted to prince Frederick Augustus. He preferred Sibyllenort over the Oels castle in Oleśnica. He significantly renovated and expanded Sibyllenort from 1792 to 1805. The main building was raised with an additional floor, the main facade received projecting bay windows, and two domed round towers were added on the courtyard side. Additionally, four outbuildings were constructed, including a theatre. The gardens were designed by Christian Weiss. Joseph von Eichendorff visited the palace in 1803 and praised the combination of luxury and taste.

When duke Frederick August died, the duchy and the Sibyllenort palace went to his nephew, Frederick William (1771–1815), who inherited the Duchy of Brunswick as well.

==== Gallery: Sibyllenort in the time of duke Frederick Augustus ====
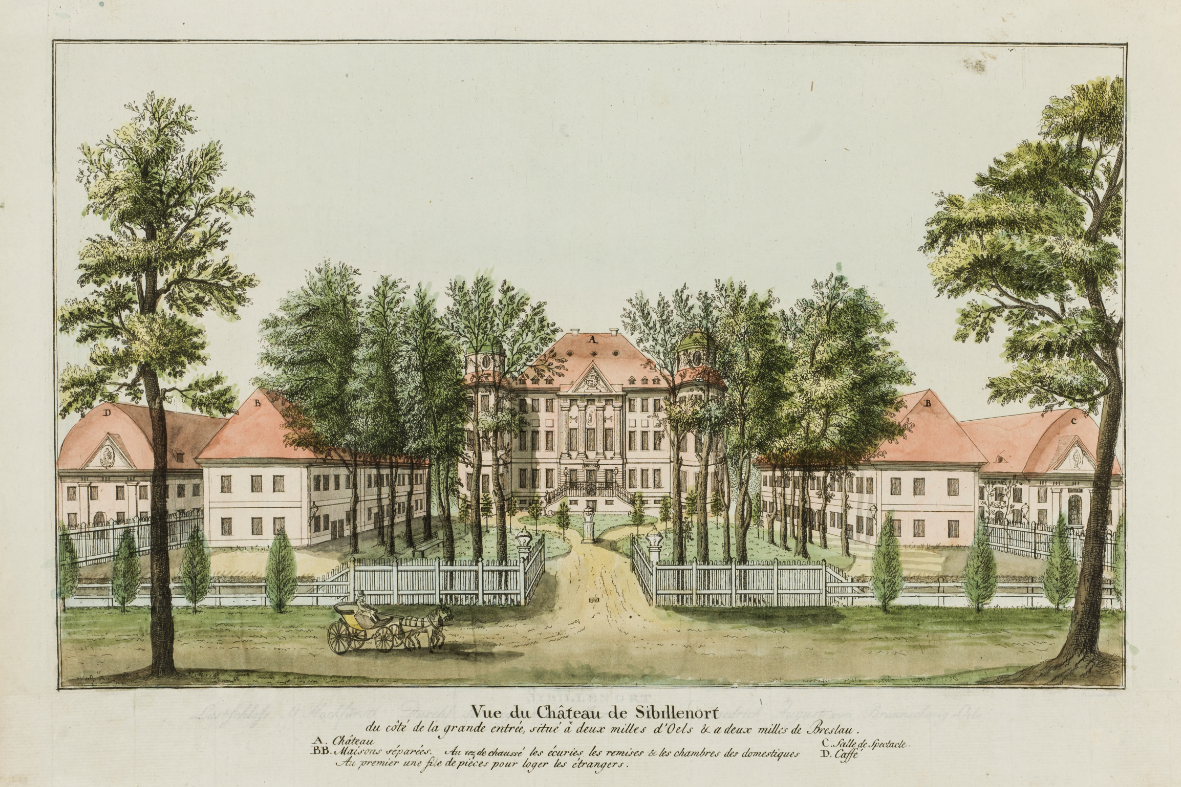
Sibyllenort in 1802

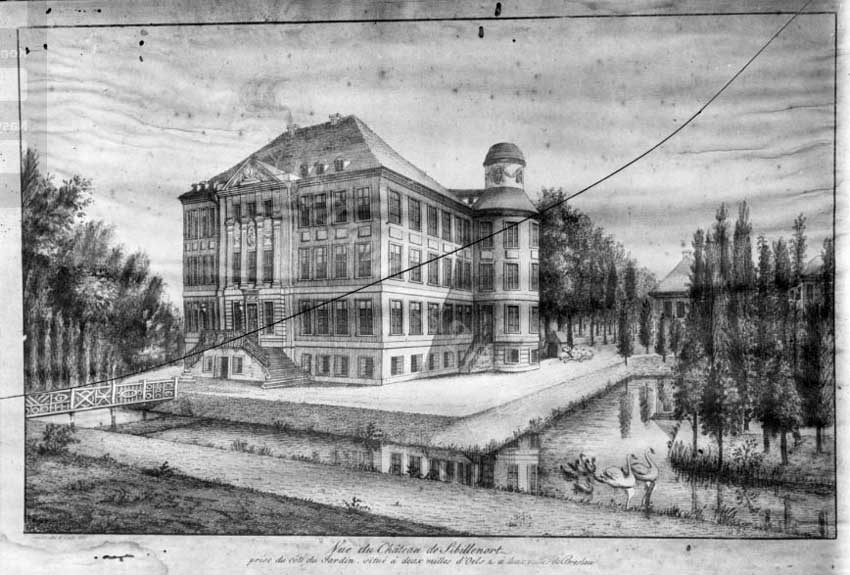
Garden side of Sibyllenort by Sandler in 1802

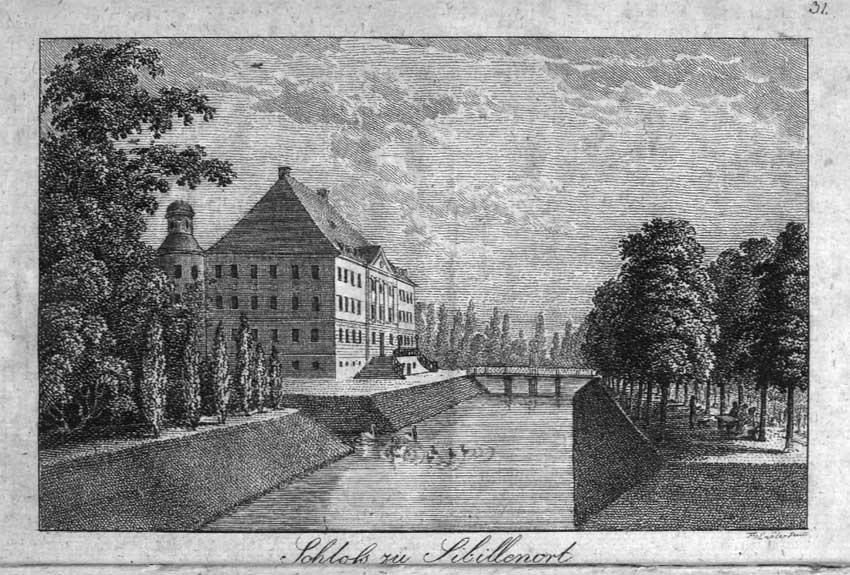
Garden side of Sibyllenort in 1803

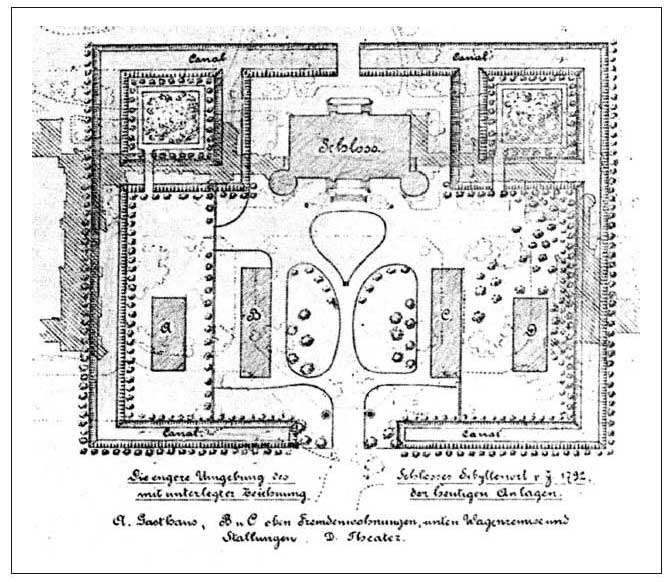
Plan of Sibyllenort in 1792 with expansions started in 1851

=== Duke of Brunswick: duke William ===
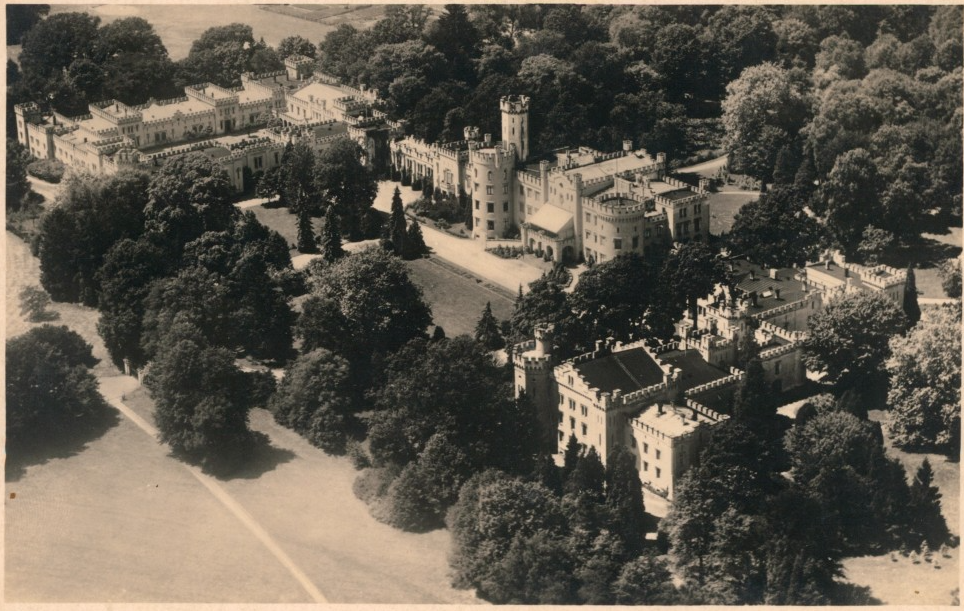
Sibyllenort from the air in 1932

From 1824 onwards, it was owned by the last Duke of Oels, William, Duke of Brunswick (1806–1884). In 1829, he hosted at Sibyllenort the Russian tsar Nicholas I and his wife, Charlotte of Prussia.

Between 1851 and 1857, Duke William, under the direction of architect Carl Wolf, rebuilt and significantly expanded the palace complex in the style of Windsor Castle in the British Tudor style, comprising 400 rooms. The length of the palace was 300 metres, of which the frontal façade was 100 metres long. East of the newly integrated corps de logis, a new economic wing was built, as well as a glazed orangery. Simultaneously, a 75-hectare English landscape park with several ponds and a wild game reserve of over 200 hectares were created. It was possible to visit the park and 60 representative rooms with a large collection of 5,000 prints and paintings, and Meissen porcelain, making the palace a popular tourist attraction. The theatre within the palace featured actors from Wrocław and a professional ballet from Brunswick.

William made Sibyllenort his main residence and died there on 18 June 1884, unmarried and without legitimate heirs. He bequeathed Sibyllenort to his nephew, Albert, King of Saxony (1828–1902). The duchy of Oels itself returned to the Prussian crown. The Oels castle became one of the residences of the Prussian crown prince.

==== Gallery: Introduction of the Tudor style by duke William ====
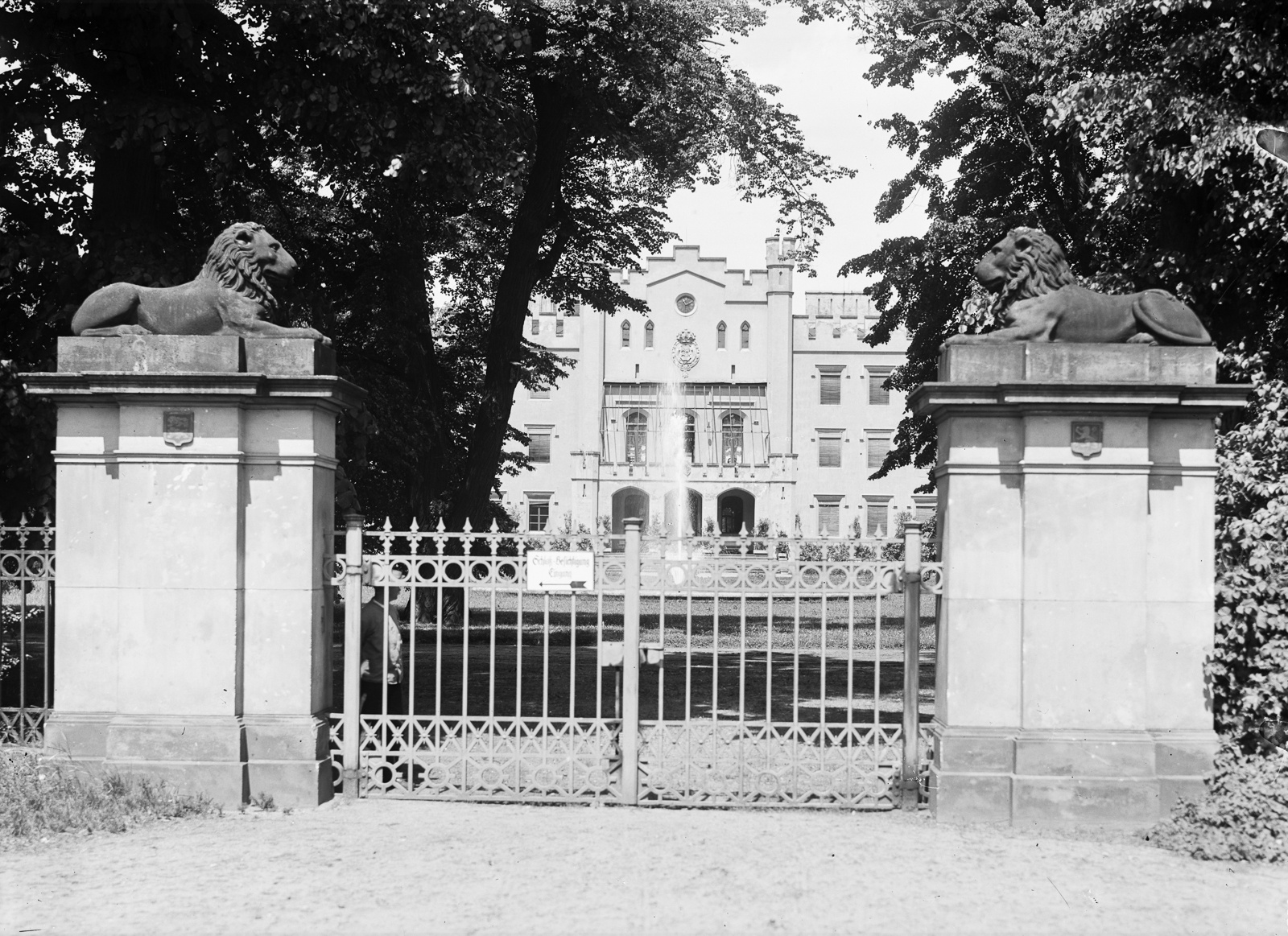
Entrance of Sibyllenort

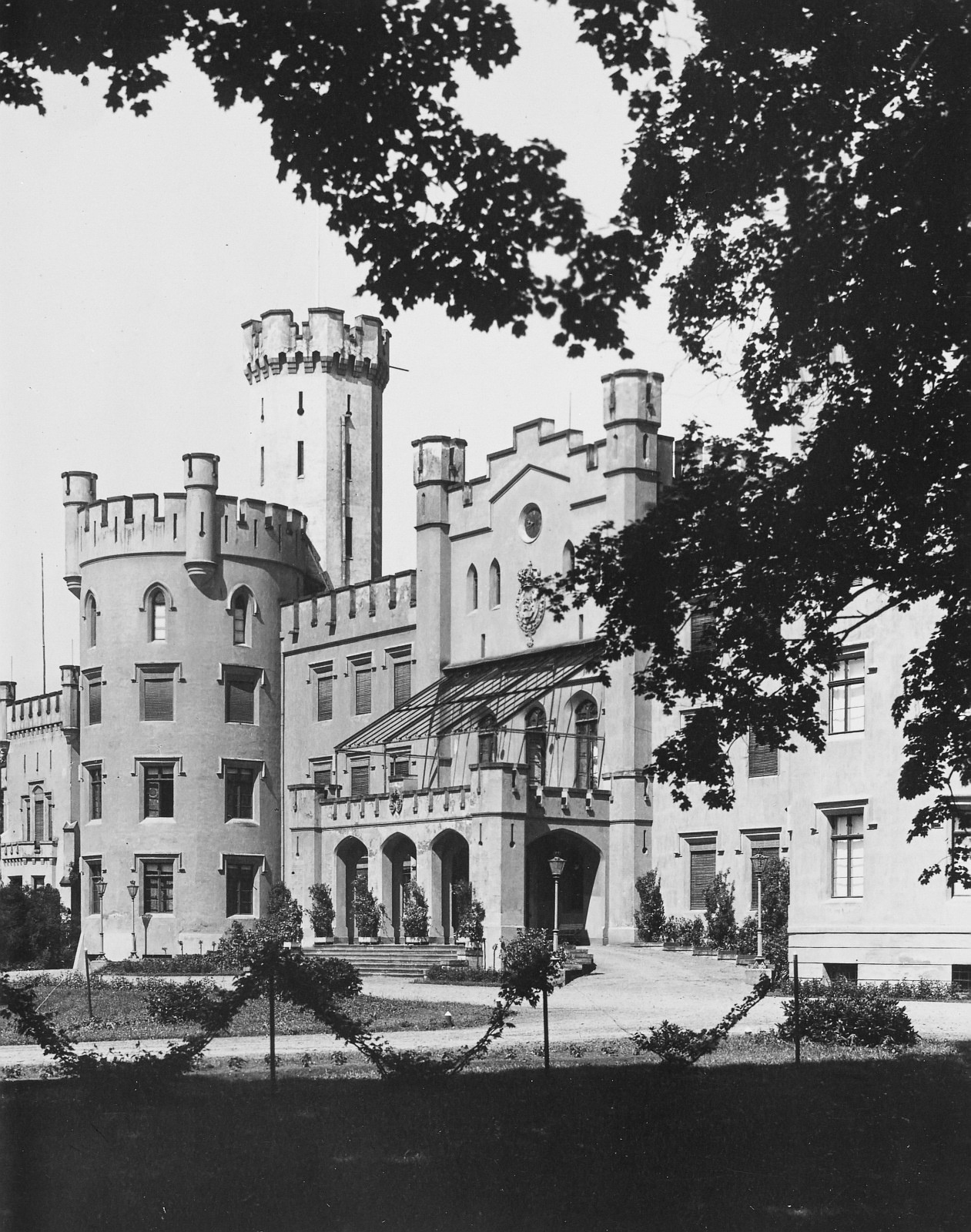
Front facade of Sibyllenort around 1920–1935

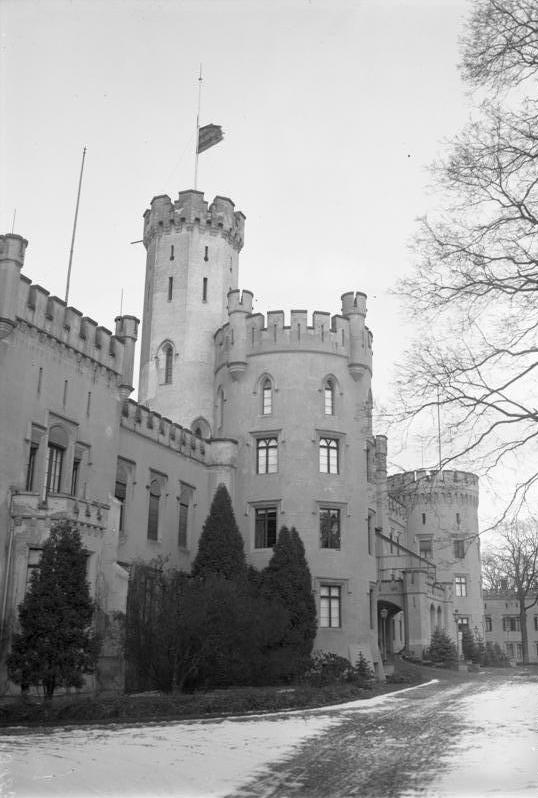
The octagonal tower is inspired by Guy's Tower of Warwick Castle in England

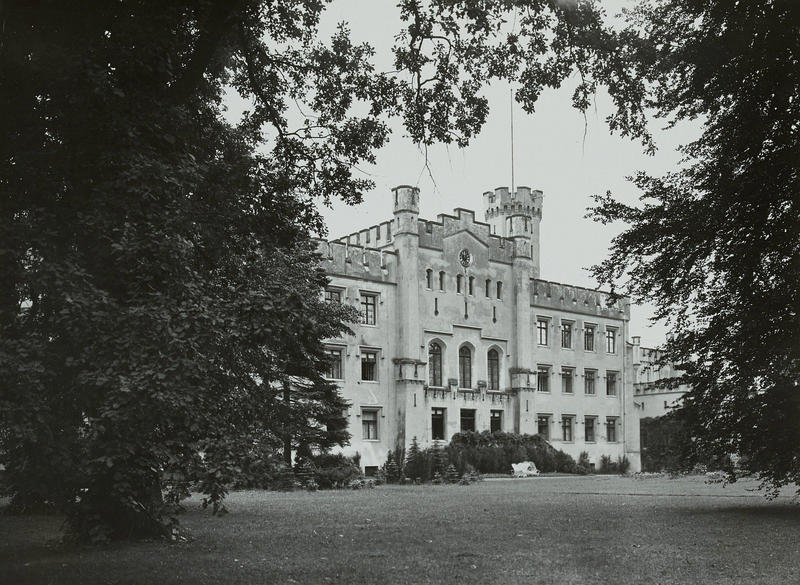
Garden front of Sibyllenort

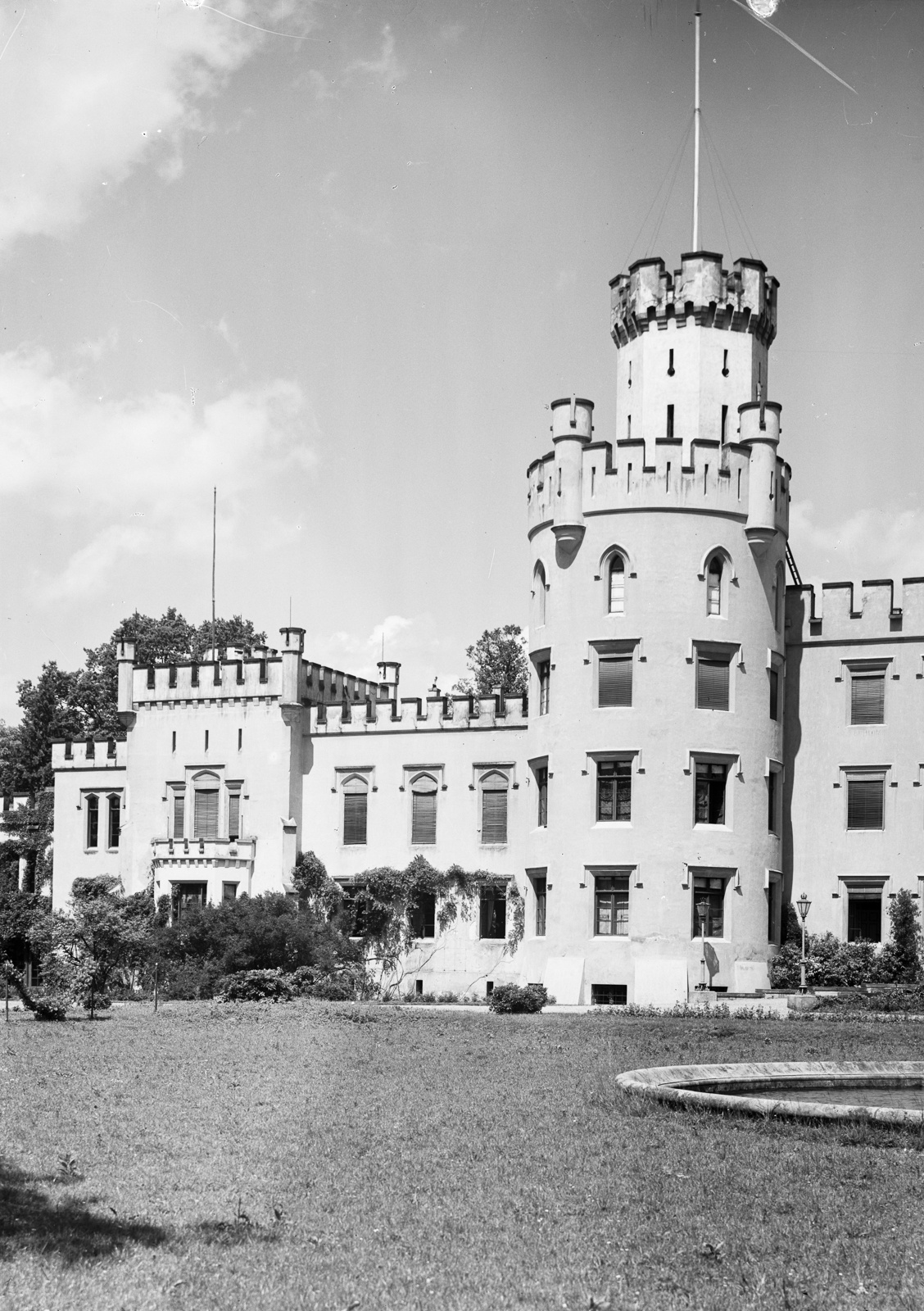
Side wing of Sibyllenort

=== Saxon royal family ===
King Albert of Saxony used Sibyllenort as a summer residence. Under Albert, the theatre was converted into a chapel, the palace received water and sewage systems, and the large fountain in front of the main facade was installed. Also, there were other improvements; a marble altar was imported from Venice and the dining room walls were covered with embossed leather depicting ancient scenes.

The Archduchess Louise of Austria (1870–1947), consort of the last King of Saxony, Frederick Augustus III (1865–1932), recounts the following about Sibyllenort Castle in her memoirs:

"In the summer of 1902 we were in the country, but our usually pleasant holiday was clouded by the serious condition of King Albert, who was on the point of death. The King and Queen were staying at the Castle of Sibyllenort near Breslau (Wrocław) in Silesia, a beautiful residence given by the last Duke of Brunswick to the then King of Saxony. The castle contains four hundred rooms, and it was the scene of many scandalous orgies in the later forties. The Duke, who was a great admirer of the fair sex, had a private theatre there, and the ballet was composed of numerous pretty girls, whom he kept in harem-like seclusion. I remember seeing some rather startling pictures when I visited the castle as a girl of sixteen, but these were very properly banished by Queen Carola's orders, and Sibyllenort became a highly decorous royal residence."

After the abdication of the king Frederick Augustus III in 1918, Sibyllenort became his permanent residence. He died there in 1932. During this time, a unique collection of Meissen porcelain was assembled.

His heir, Frederick Christian of Saxony (1893–1968), could not afford to maintain the huge building. This led to a large part of the interior furnishings being auctioned off in 1935. The remainder of the furniture was transferred to Frederick Christian's newly built Wachwitz Palace in Dresden. The library went to the University of Breslau. A wing of the palace was converted into apartments, but no concept for its overall use was found.

==== Gallery: A tour of the Sibyllenort palace interior in the time of king Frederick Augustus III ====
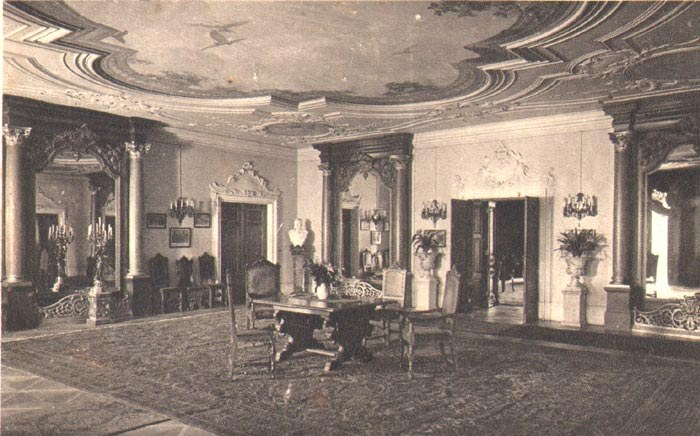
The vestibule

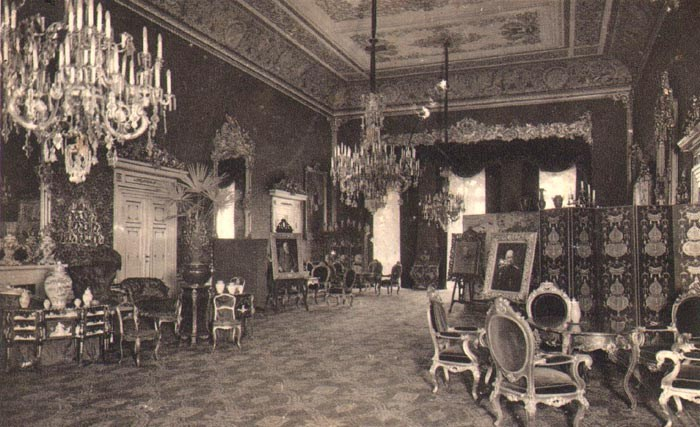
The Roter Saal

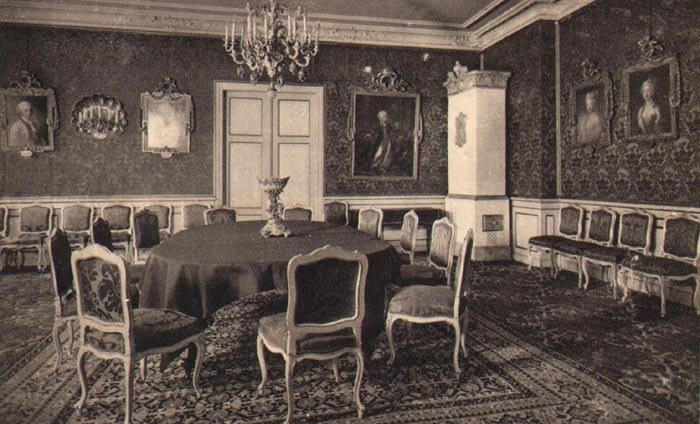
The little dining room

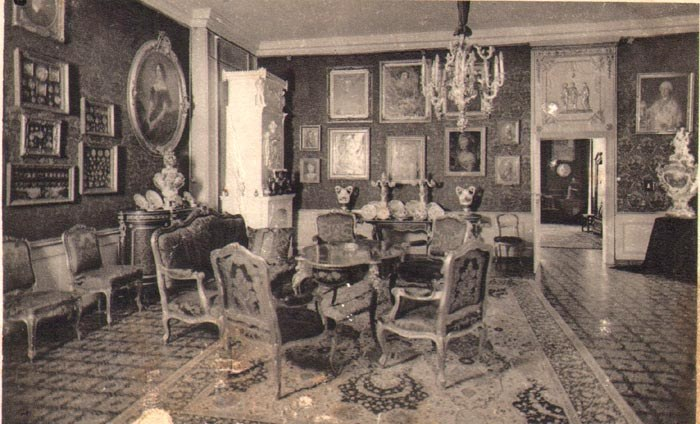
The salon of king Frederick Augustus III

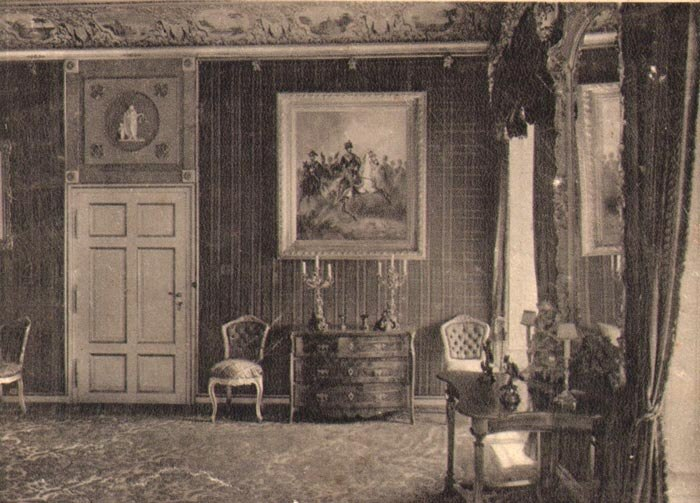
Room dedicated to duke William of Brunswick

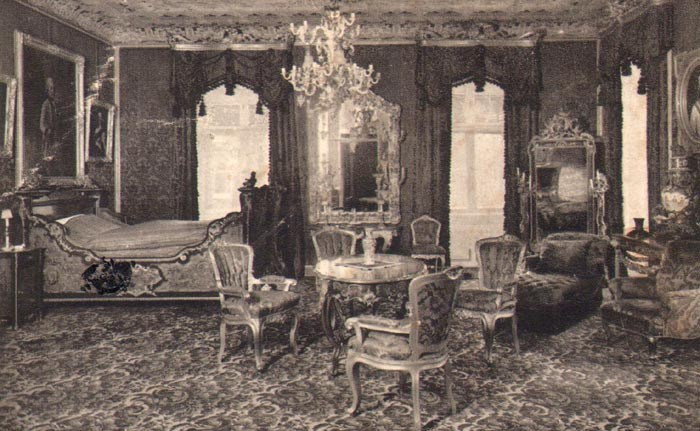
Room dedicated to king Albert of Saxony

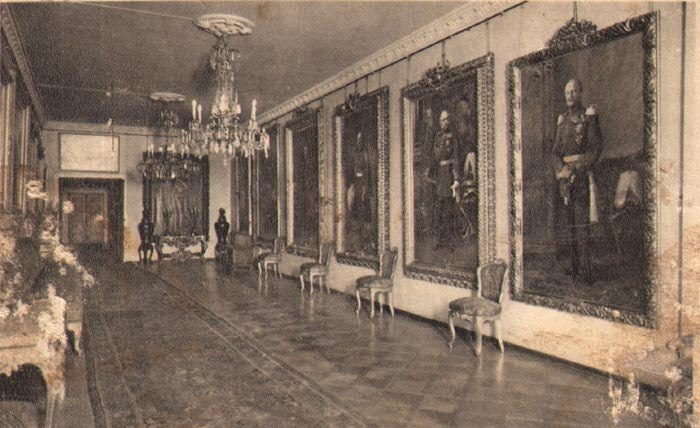
The painting's gallery

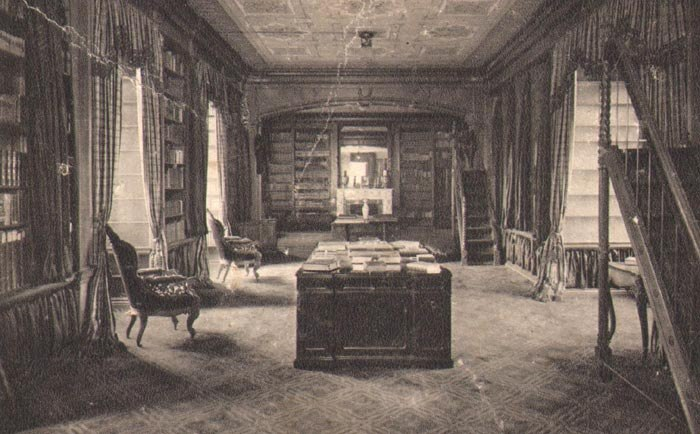
The library

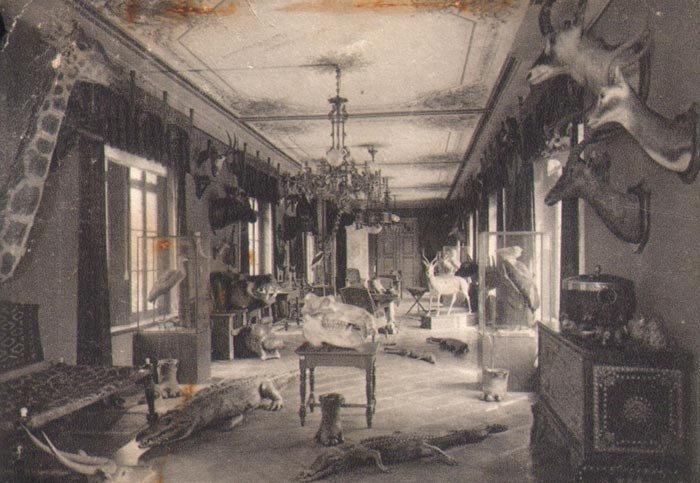
Trophy's gallery

=== Second World War ===
From 1939, the palace buildings were used as a Luftwaffe main depot. On 26 January 1945, as the Red Army approached, the central building of the palace was blown up, resulting in the entire building burning down. This was done either by retreating soldiers of the Wehrmacht or looting soldiers of the Red Army.

=== Communist Poland ===
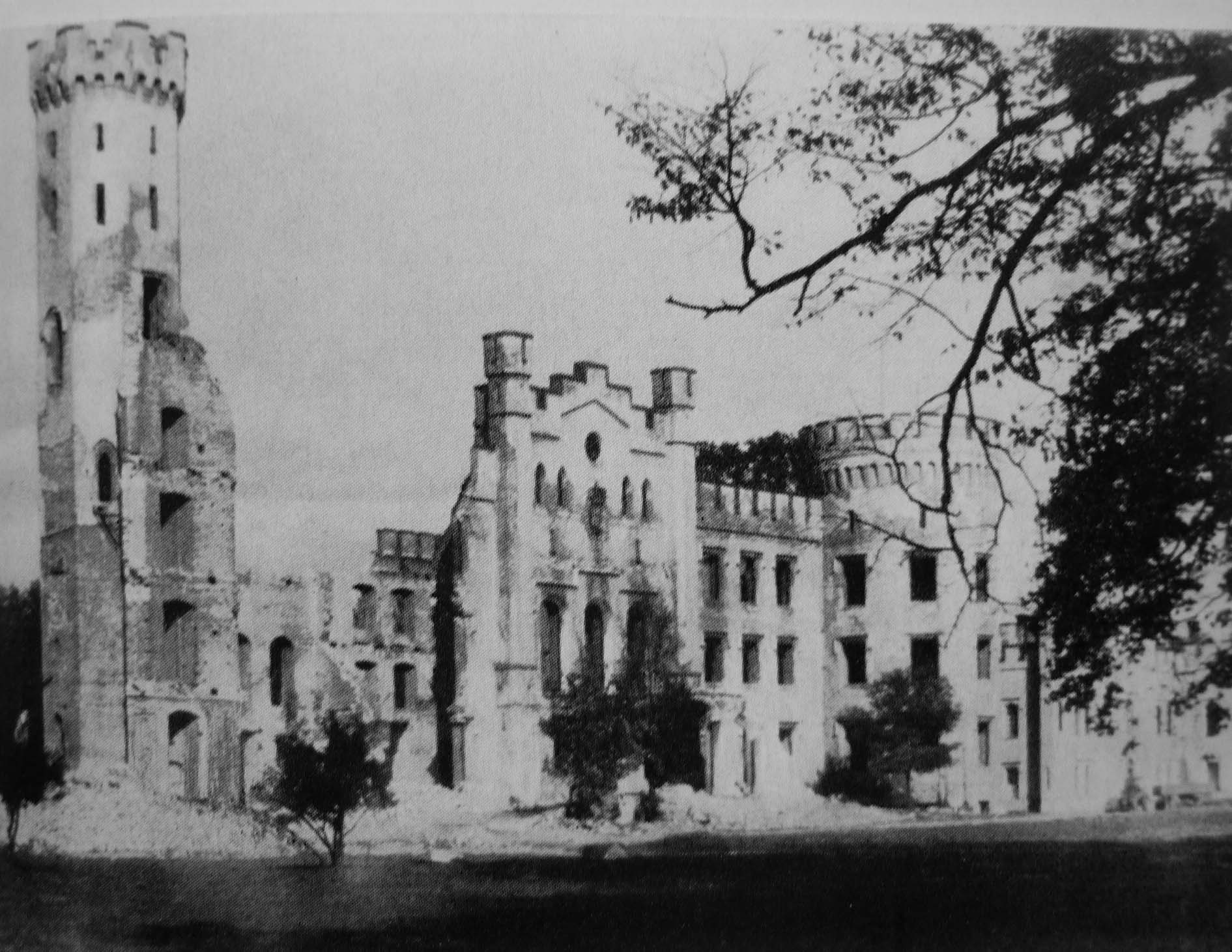
The ruins of Sibyllenort in 1945

The last royal owner was prince Fredrick Christian. When Silesia came under Polish administration after World War II, Schloss Sibyllenort and its estate were confiscated. Under the People's Republic of Poland, the still-usable parts of the buildings were used by the State Security Service, including as a recreational centre for officials. After extensive renovation from 1977 to 1980, the preserved part of the east wing became a training centre for employees of the Lower Silesia Voivodeship and the city of Wrocław.

Simultaneously, demolition of the ruins began in the 1950s, with interruptions until 1989. Neo-gothic buildings were stigmatized as they clearly had German origins. Initially, buildings built after 1850 were not entered in the monument register at all. The stones were partly used for the reconstruction of cities destroyed during the war, like Warsaw.

=== Modern times ===
In the contemporary period, the remnants of the palace complex, including the palace wing, outbuilding, park with a forest, and a walled fence with a gate, were listed as historic monuments in 1990. Since 1988, the palace wing has remained unused, while former State Agricultural Farm employees reside in the outbuilding. In 1992, the property was sold to a private company, and in 2001, it passed into private ownership. In 1999, the iron lion sculptures from the entrance gate went missing.

== Modern remnants ==
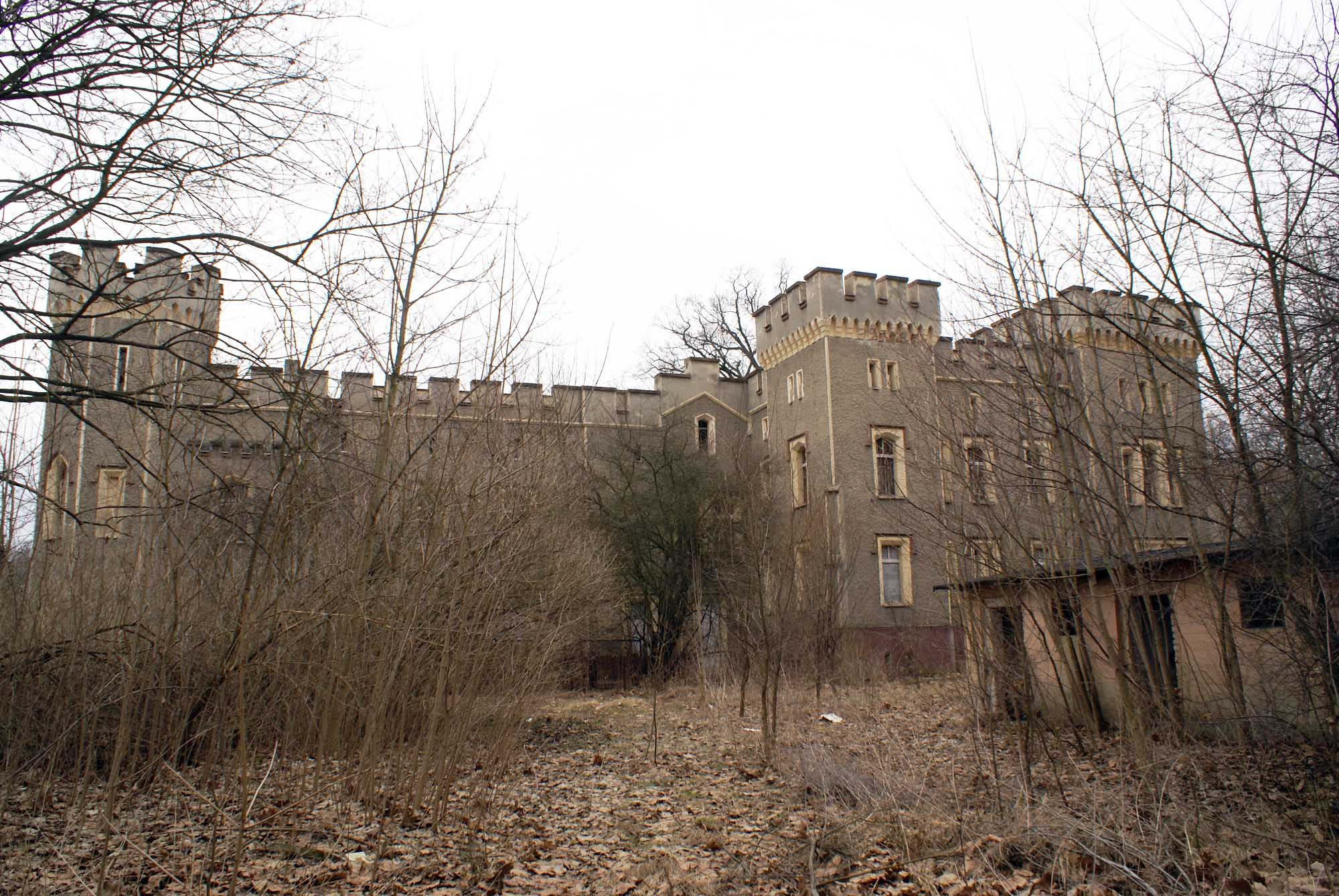
The remains of Sibyllenort in 2010

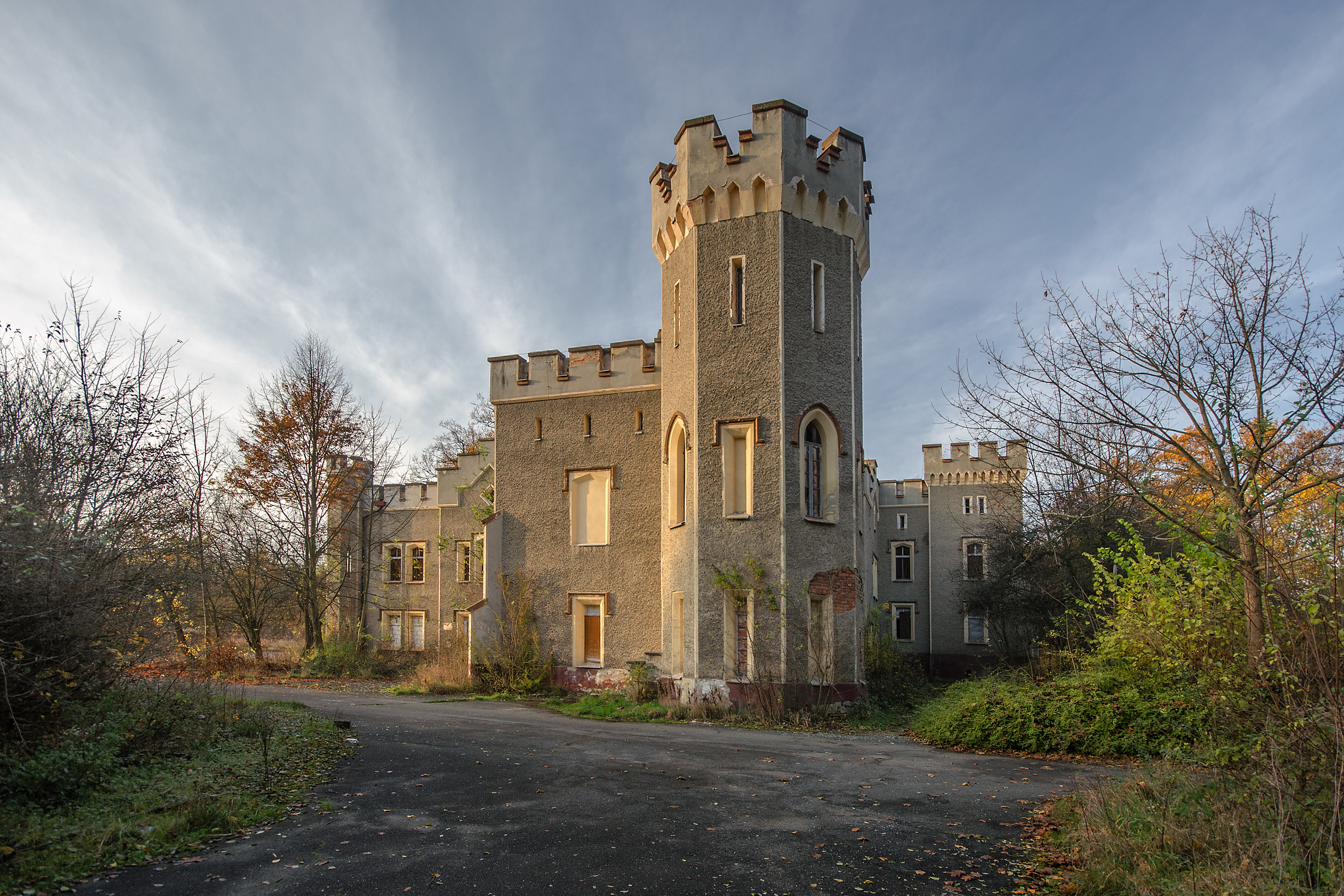
The remains of Sibyllenort in 2014

Still existing structures in 2015 included:

- A fragment of the eastern wing – brick-built, two-story, in the style of English neo-Gothic, two-winged with two corner octagonal towers, three and four-axis with a roof hidden behind an attic with battlements;
- A fragment of the theatre building (currently a residential house) – brick-built, two-story, in the style of English neo-Gothic, built on a square plan, three-axis with a flat roof hidden behind an attic, with a projecting bay on the front facade with a stepped gable;
- The palace park – in the English style, covering an area of 9.75 hectares, with a horseshoe-shaped pond covering an area of 1 hectare, with a group of weeping willows;
- Landscape-botanical garden (currently a forest) – covering an area of 75 hectares, ponds covering an area of 10 hectares, within which there are monumental trees – ginkgo biloba and pedunculate oaks;
- South gate (formerly topped by iron lions) – brick-built, stone-faced, consisting of four pillars on a plinth crowned with an arcaded frieze with crenelations;
- West gate (formerly topped by iron lions) – brick-built, stone-faced, consisting of four pillars on a plinth crowned with visible heraldic shields;
- Park keeper's house (currently abandoned) – brick-built, single-story, in the shape of the letter T, with a gable roof covered with fish-scale tiles with wide eaves, some windows with triangular pediments framed with decorative lintels;
- Park keeper's house (currently abandoned) – brick-built, single-story, in the shape of the letter L, with a gable roof covered with tiles with wide eaves, some windows with triangular pediments, common decorative lintel; and
- Game reserve (currently forest) – covering an area of 200 hectares.

In the former park there is also a memorial cross for King Albert, which his wife Carola (1833–1907) had erected after his death.

== Literature ==
- Sieber, Helmut (1957). Schlösser und Herrensitz in Schlesien – Nach alten Stichen und Zeichnungen (in German). Frankfurt am Main: Wolfgang Weidlich. pp. 73–74.
- von Golitschek, Josef (1988). Schlesien – Land der Schlösser – Band 2 (in German). Mannheim: Orbis Verlag. p. 165. ISBN 3-572-09275-2.
- Franke, Arne (2015). Kleine Kulturgeschichte der schlesischen Schlösser (in German). Görlitz: Bergstadtverlag Wilhelm Gottlieb Korn. pp. 285–287. ISBN 978-3-87057-336-2.
- Kretzschmann, Iris; Thieme, André (2019). "Besuche nach dem Untergang – Sibyllenort gestern und heute". »Macht euern Dreck alleene!«: Der letzte sächsische König, seine Schlösser und die Revolution 1918 (in German). Dresden: Sandstein Verlag. pp. 194–222. ISBN 978-3-95498-396-4.
