= William, Duke of Brunswick =

German duke (1806–1884)

William
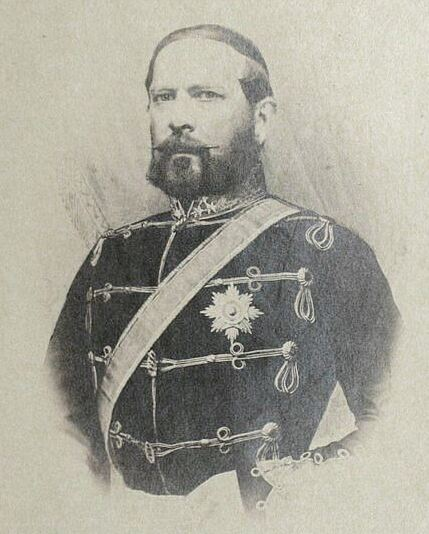
- Photograph c. 1870

Duke of Brunswick
- Reign: 9 September 1830 – 18 October 1884
- Predecessor: Charles II
- Successor: Prince Albert of Prussia (as Imperial Regent)
- Born: 25 April 1806; Brunswick, Brunswick-Wolfenbüttel
- Died: 18 October 1884 (aged 78); Sibyllenort, Silesia, Prussia
Names
- William Augustus Louis Maximilian Frederick; German: Wilhelm August Ludwig Maximilian Friedrich
- House: House of Brunswick-Bevern
- Father: Frederick William, Duke of Brunswick-Wolfenbüttel
- Mother: Princess Marie of Baden

William, Duke of Brunswick (German: Wilhelm August Ludwig Maximilian Friedrich; 25 April 1806 – 18 October 1884), was ruling duke of the Duchy of Brunswick from 1830 until his death.

William was the second son of Frederick William, Duke of Brunswick-Lüneburg, and after the death of his father in 1815, was under the guardianship of his paternal great-granduncle King George IV of the United Kingdom. He became a Prussian major in 1823. When his brother, Charles, was deposed as ruling duke by a rebellion in 1830, William took over the government provisionally. In 1831, a family law of the House of Welf made William the ruling duke permanently. William left most government business to his ministers, spending most of his time at Oleśnica Castle in what is now southwestern Poland.

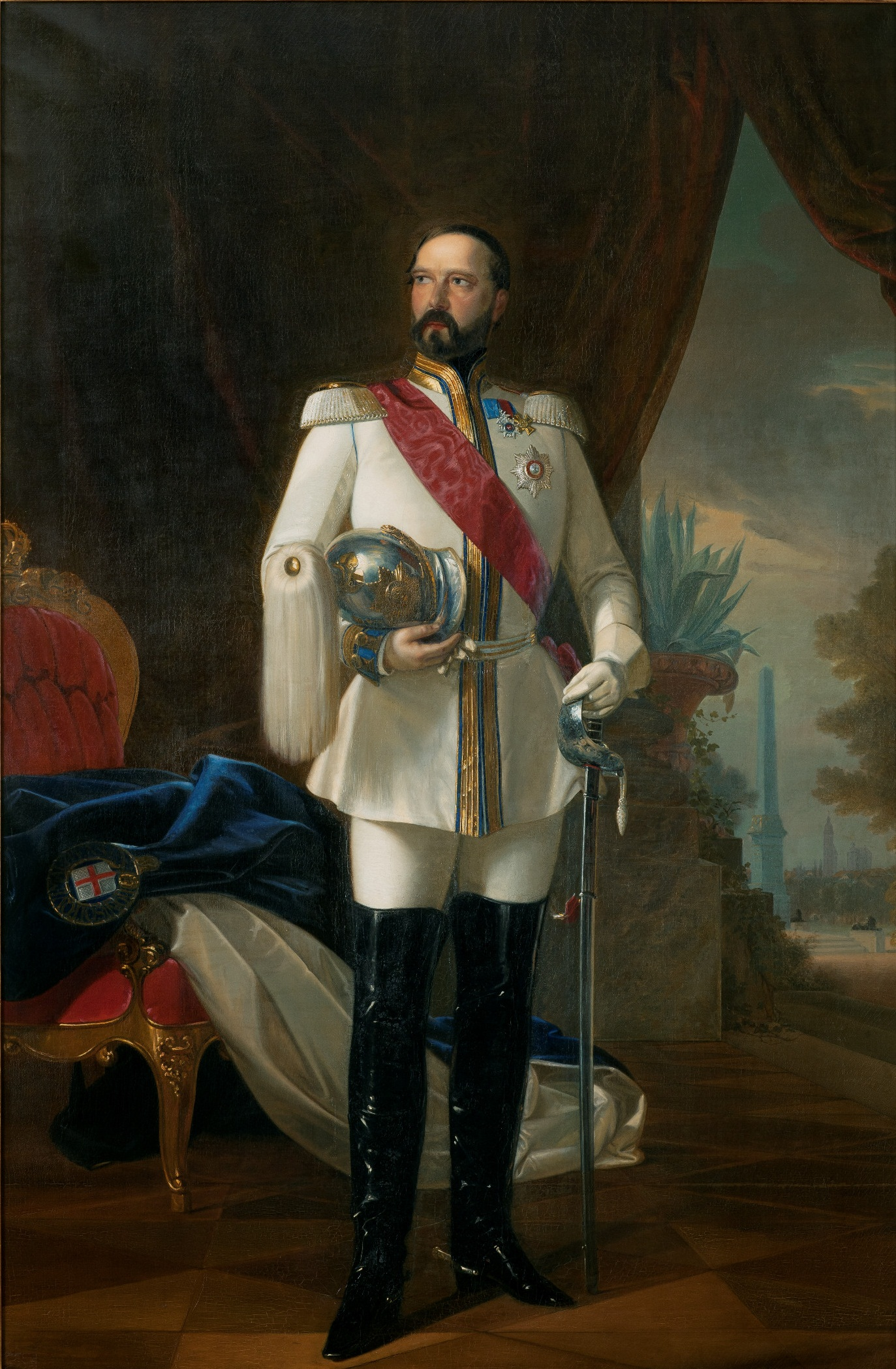
Portrait of William by Gustav Adolf Barthel, 1870

While William joined the Prussian-led North German Confederation in 1866, his relationship to Prussia was strained, since Prussia refused to recognize his paternal grandnephew Ernest Augustus, Crown Prince of Hanover, as his heir, because of the Duke of Cumberland's claim to the throne of Hanover. William died in 1884; he passed on his private possessions to the Duke of Cumberland. His death caused a constitutional crisis for Brunswick that lasted until the accession of his paternal great-grandnephew Ernest Augustus, Duke of Brunswick (a male line descendant of William, the younger brother of Henry, his male line ancestor), in 1913.

William died unmarried, but had a number of illegitimate children.

== Honours ==
- Duchy of Brunswick: Grand Master of the Order of Henry the Lion
- Baden:
  - Grand Cross of the Zähringer Lion, 1817
  - Grand Cross of the House Order of Fidelity, 1819
- United Kingdom: Stranger Knight of the Garter, 20 June 1831
- Kingdom of Prussia: Knight of the Black Eagle, 10 February 1833
- Kingdom of Hanover: Knight of St. George, 1839
- Oldenburg: Grand Cross of the Order of Duke Peter Friedrich Ludwig, with Golden Crown, 8 October 1843
- Austrian Empire: Grand Cross of St. Stephen, 1843
- (Saxe-Coburg and Gotha) (Duchy of Saxe-Altenburg) (Saxe-Meiningen) Ernestine duchies: Grand Cross of the Saxe-Ernestine House Order, 1846
- Grand Duchy of Hesse: Grand Cross of the Ludwig Order, 20 November 1855
- Electorate of Hesse: Knight of the Golden Lion, 14 April 1857
- Saxe-Weimar-Eisenach: Grand Cross of the White Falcon, 10 December 1859
- Nassau: Knight of the Gold Lion of Nassau, June 1860
- Württemberg: Grand Cross of the Württemberg Crown, 1860

William, Duke of Brunswick House of Brunswick-Bevern Cadet branch of the House of Welf Born: 25 April 1806 Died: 18 October 1884
German royalty
Preceded by Charles II	Duke of Brunswick-Wolfenbüttel; 1830–1884	Vacant Title next held by Ernest Augustus — Prince Ernest Augustus (titular)
