= Szczodre =

- Village
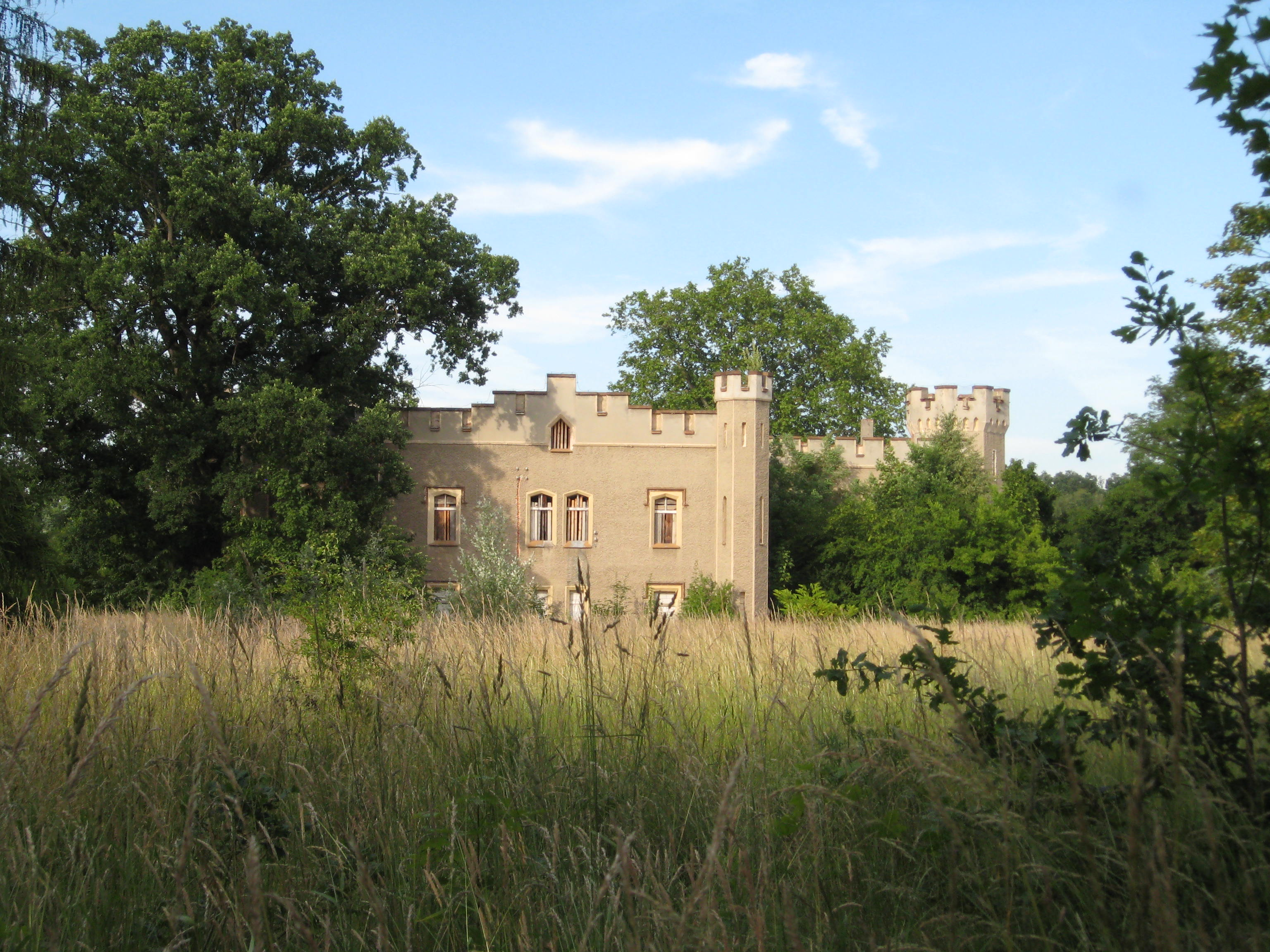
- Remains of Szczodre Palace

- Location within Poland
- Coordinates: 51°11′43″N 17°11′2″E
- Country: Poland
- Voivodeship: Lower Silesian
- County: Wrocław
- Gmina: Długołęka
- Time zone: UTC+1 (CET)
  - Summer (DST): UTC+2 (CEST)
- Postal code: 55-095
- Vehicle registration: DWR

Szczodre [ˈʂt͡ʂɔdrɛ] (1945-1948: Sybilin, German: Sibyllenort) is a village in the administrative district of Gmina Długołęka, within Wrocław County, Lower Silesian Voivodeship, in south-western Poland.

== Geography ==
The settlement is located within the Silesian Lowlands, approximately 3 km (2 mi) north of Długołęka, and 13 km (8 mi) north-east of the regional capital Wrocław.

== History ==
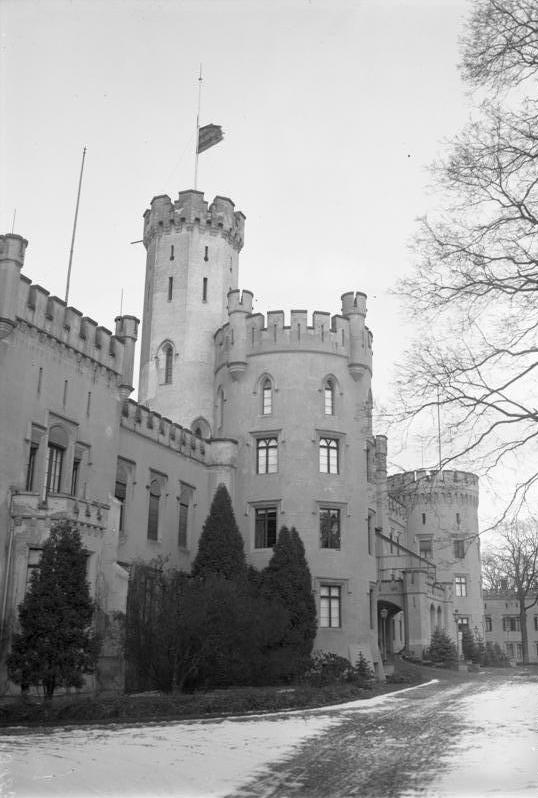
Sibyllenort Palace, 1932 condition

In the 10th century Mieszko I of Poland of the Piast dynasty included these areas into newly formed Duchy of Poland. Following Poland's fragmentation, it was located in the Duchy of Silesia. The village in the Duchy of Silesia was first mentioned as Palici in a 1245 deed. From 1315 it was the seat of the Rastelwitz noble family, and in 1327 it passed to the Crown of Bohemia (Czechia). It was completely destroyed in 1643 during the Thirty Years' War. In the 18th century it was annexed by Prussia, and from 1871 to 1945 it was also part of Germany.

The Prittwitz family had the locality of Neudorf rebuilt, which in 1685 was acquired by Christian Ulrich I of Württemberg, then Duke of Bernstadt (Bierutów). He had a Baroque palace built, named Sibyllenort after his second wife Sibylle Maria, daughter of Duke Christian I of Saxe-Merseburg. Held by the Dukes of Brunswick-Lüneburg from 1792, the castle was rebuilt several times, the last of which was in 1852 in a Tudor style at the behest of Duke William of Brunswick. The palace was often visited by Kings Augustus II the Strong and Augustus III of Poland.

Upon William's death at Sybillenort in 1884, the possessions fell to the royal Saxon House of Wettin.

The Archduchess Louise of Austria, consort of the last King of Saxony, Frederick Augustus III, recounts the following about Sibyllenort Castle in her memoirs:

"In the summer of 1902 we were in the country, but our usually pleasant holiday was clouded by the serious condition of King Albert, who was on the point of death. The King and Queen were staying at the Castle of Sibyllenort near Breslau (Wrocław) in Silesia, a beautiful residence given by the last Duke of Brunswick to the then King of Saxony. The castle contains four hundred rooms, and it was the scene of many scandalous orgies in the later forties. The Duke, who was a great admirer of the fair sex, had a private theatre there, and the ballet was composed of numerous pretty girls, whom he kept in harem-like seclusion. I remember seeing some rather startling pictures when I visited the castle as a girl of sixteen, but these were very properly banished by Queen Carola's orders, and Sibyllenort became a highly decorous royal residence."

Two kings of Saxony died here: Albert in 1902 and Frederick Augustus III, in 1932.

The palace in Sibyllenort was taken over by SS troops during World War II, who burned the palace in January 1945, leaving it in a partially destroyed state. The neighboring city of Wrocław (Breslau) was the locale of a battle a month later called the Siege of Breslau. German soldiers deliberately destroyed the palace at Sibyllenort to not leave them for the Polish people.

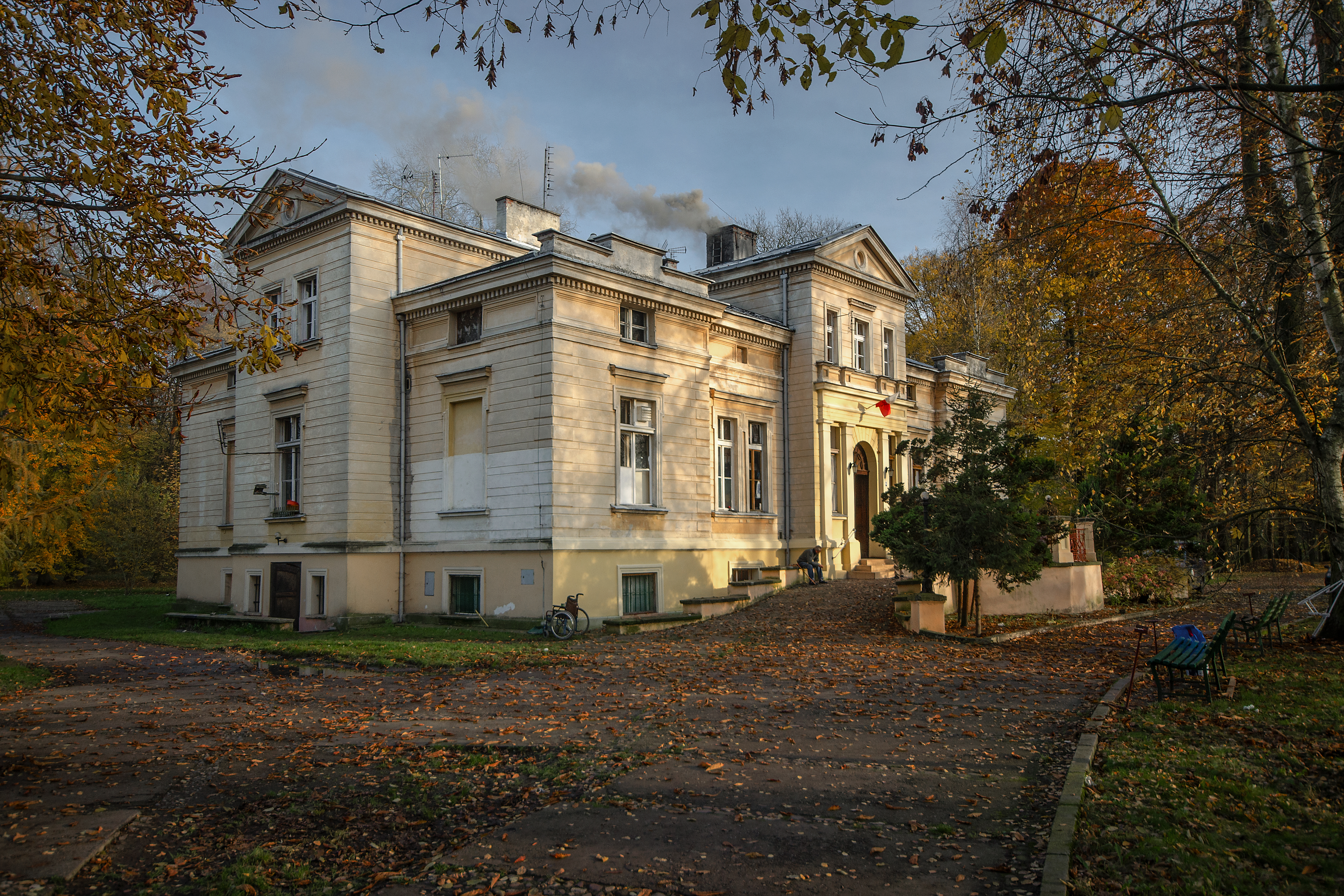
Center for the homeless in Szczodre

In 1945, following Germany's defeat in the war, the village became again part of Poland per the Potsdam Agreement, although with a Soviet-installed communist regime, which stayed in power until the Fall of Communism in the 1980s. The palatial building was almost completely dismantled in 1957. Today there is only a ruin left in the size of a small villa. The preserved part of the palace was occupied by the communist security forces of the Soviet Union and the People's Republic of Poland.

After the war, the village was repopulated with Poles displaced from the areas of Lwów and Nowogródek in former Eastern Poland annexed by the Soviet Union, small farmers from southern Poland, and Polish soldiers returning from Western Europe.

== Education ==
There is a primary school in Szczodre.
