= Polish Academy Award for Best Actor =

Annual Polish film award

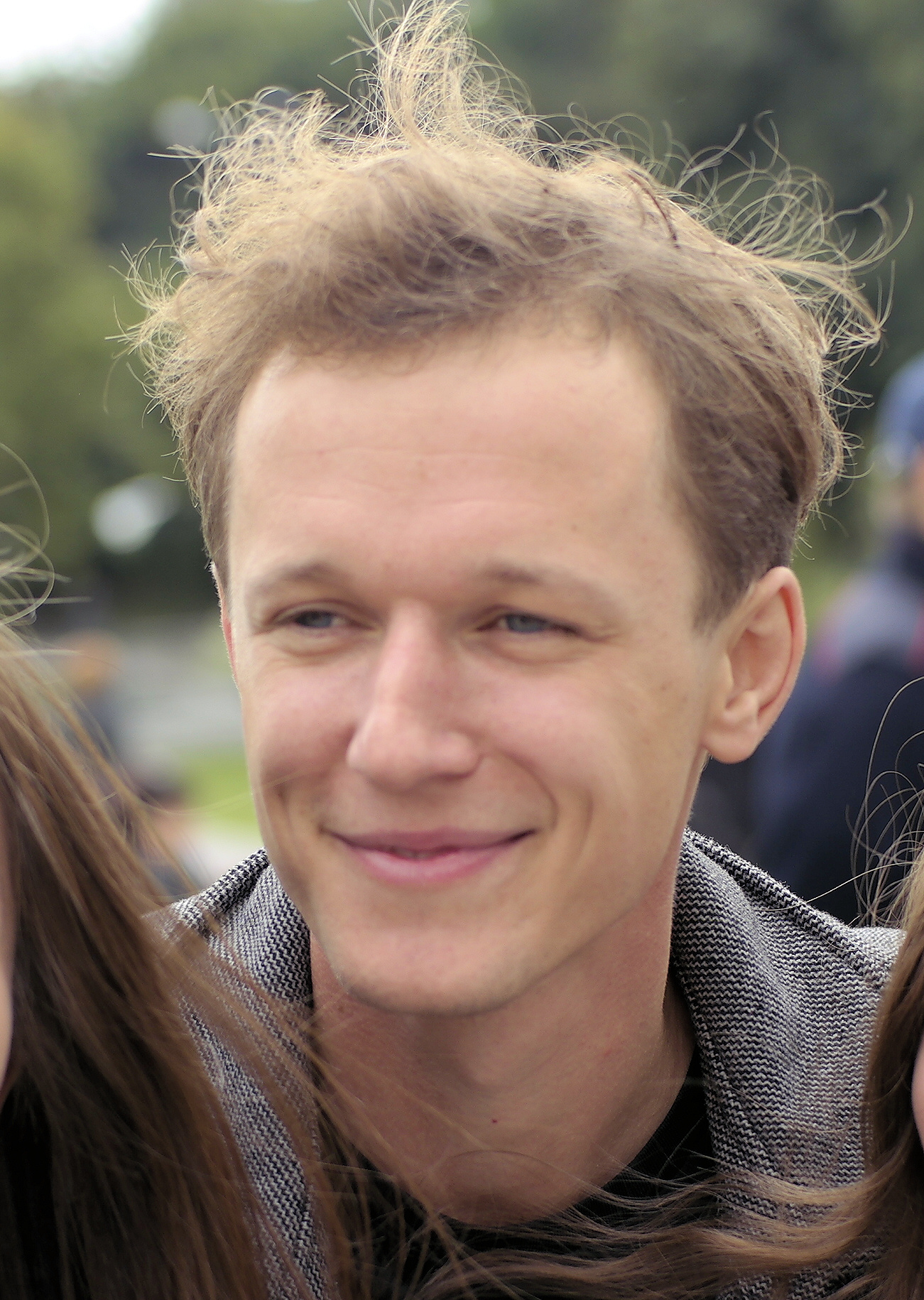
- 2025 recipient: Filip Pławiak
- Awarded for: Best Performance by an Actor in a Leading Role
- Presented by: Polish Film Academy
- First award: Olaf Lubaszenko; Sekal Has to Die (1999)
- Currently held by: Filip Pławiak; White Courage (2025)

The Polish Academy Award for Best Actor is an award given out at the annual Polish Film Awards to honor of an actor who has delivered an outstanding leading performance in the Polish film industry. The award is presented by the Polish Film Academy and was first presented in 1999.

== Winners and nominees ==
Year	Actor	Movie title	Role
1999	Olaf Lubaszenko	Zabić Sekala	Jura Baran
1999	Bartosz Opania	Historia kina w Popielawach	Józef Andryszek I
1999	Krzysztof Kolberger	Kroniki domowe	The Father
1999	Piotr Fronczewski	Łóżko Wierszynina	"Wierszynin"
1999	Zbigniew Buczkowski	Złote runo	Rysio
1999	Marek Kondrat	Złoto dezerterów	Jan Kania
2000	Robert Gonera	Dług	Adam Borecki
2000	Mirosław Baka	Amok	Maksymilian "Max" Rybak
2000	Michał Żebrowski	Ogniem i mieczem	Jan Skrzetuski
2000	Bogusław Linda	Pan Tadeusz	Jacek Soplica
2000	Jerzy Stuhr	Tydzień z życia mężczyzny	Adam Borowski
2001	Zbigniew Zapasiewicz	Życie jako śmiertelna choroba przenoszona drogą płciową	Tomasz Berg
2001	Jerzy Stuhr	Duże zwierzę	Zygmunt Sawicki
2001	Janusz Gajos	Ostatnia misja	Piotr Sobczak
2001	Marek Kondrat	Prawo ojca	Michał Kord
2001	Andrzej Seweryn	Prymas - trzy lata z tysiąca	Stefan Wyszyński
2002	Zbigniew Zamachowski	Cześć Tereska	Edzio
2002	Rafał Królikowski	Pół serio	"Angel"/pastor Lovborg/Skywalker/Frederic Chopin/SB general/Józef K.
2002	Franciszek Pieczka	Requiem	Bartłomiej Grab
2002	Marek Kondrat	Weiser	Paweł Heller
2002	Michał Żebrowski	Wiedźmin	Geralt of Rivia
2003	Marek Kondrat	Dzień Świra	Adaś Miauczyński
2003	Henryk Gołębiewski	Edi	Edi
2003	Adrien Brody	Pianista	Władysław Szpilman
2003	Janusz Gajos	Tam i z powrotem	Andrzej Hoffman
2003	Janusz Gajos	Zemsta	Maciej Raptusiewicz
2004	Zbigniew Zamachowski	Zmruż oczy	Jasiek
2004	Jerzy Stuhr	Pogoda na jutro	Józef Kozioł
2004	Krzysztof Majchrzak	Pornografia	Fryderyk
2005	Marian Dziędziel	Wesele	Wiesław Wojnar
2005	Michał Żebrowski	Pręgi	Wojciech Winkler
2005	Jan Peszek	Ubu król	Ubu
2006	Andrzej Chyra	Komornik	Lucjan Bohme
2006	Zbigniew Zapasiewicz	Persona non grata	Wiktor Leszczyński
2006	Tomasz Kot	Skazany na bluesa	Ryszard Riedel
2007	Janusz Gajos	Jasminum	Brother Zdrówko
2007	Leon Niemczyk	Po sezonie	Leon Kos
2007	Marek Kondrat	Wszyscy jesteśmy Chrystusami	Adaś Miauczyński (55 years old)
2008	Robert Więckiewicz	Wszystko będzie dobrze	Teacher Andrzej
2008	Andrzej Chyra	Katyń	Porucznik Jerzy
2008	Andrzej Hudziak	Parę osób, mały czas	Miron Białoszewski
2009	Krzysztof Stroiński	Rysa	Jan Żółwieński
2009	Maciej Stuhr	33 sceny z życia	Piotr Malkiewicz
2009	Marcin Dorociński	Boisko bezdomnych	Jacek Mróz
2010	Borys Szyc	Wojna polsko-ruska	Andrzej Robakowski "Silny" ("Strong")
2010	Marian Dziędziel	Dom zły	Zdzisław Dziabas
2010	Marcin Dorociński	Rewers	Bronisław Toporek vel Falski/Marek, Sabina's son
2011	Robert Więckiewicz	Różyczka	Roman Rożek
2011	Vincent Gallo	Essential Killing	Mohammed
2011	Mateusz Kościukiewicz	Wszystko, co kocham	Janek
2012	Robert Więckiewicz	W ciemności	Leopold Socha
2012	Marcin Dorociński	Róża	Tadeusz
2012	Jakub Gierszał	Sala samobójców	Dominik Santorski
2013	Maciej Stuhr	Pokłosie	Józef Kalina
2013	Bartłomiej Topa	Drogówka	staff sergeant Ryszard Król
2013	Marcin Dorociński	Obława	Kapral "Wydra" ("Otter")
2014	Dawid Ogrodnik	Chce się żyć	Mateusz Rosiński
2014	Janusz Gajos	Układ zamknięty	prosecutor Andrzej Kostrzewa
2014	Robert Więckiewicz	Wałęsa. Człowiek z nadziei	Lech Wałęsa
2015	Tomasz Kot	Bogowie	Zbigniew Religa
2015	Marcin Dorociński	Jack Strong	Ryszard Kukliński
2015	Robert Więckiewicz	Pod Mocnym Aniołem	Jerzy
2016	Janusz Gajos	Body/Ciało	Prosecutor Janusz Koprowicz
2016	Maciej Stuhr	Excentrycy, czyli po słonecznej stronie ulicy	Fabian Apanowicz
2016	Marian Dziędziel	Moje córki krowy	Tadeusz Makowski
2017	Andrzej Seweryn	Ostatnia rodzina	Zdzisław Beksiński
2017	Mirosław Haniszewski	Jestem mordercą	Janusz Jasiński
2017	Arkadiusz Jakubik	Wołyń	Maciej Skiba
2018	Dawid Ogrodnik	Cicha Noc	Adam
2018	Jakub Gierszał	Najlepszy	Jerzy Górski
2018	Bogusław Linda	Powidoki	Władysław Strzemiński
2019	Jacek Braciak	Kler	Priest Leszek Lisowski
2019	Tomasz Kot	Zimna wojna	Wiktor Warski
2019	Janusz Gajos	Kamerdyner	Bazyli Miotke
2020	Bartosz Bielenia	Boże Ciało	Daniel
2020	Borys Szyc	Piłsudski	Józef Piłsudski
2020	Dawid Ogrodnik	Ikar. Legenda Mietka Kosza	Mieczysław Kosz
2020	Jacek Braciak	Córka trenera	Maciej Kornet
2020	Paweł Wilczak	Pan T.	Mr. T
2021	Piotr Trojan	25 lat niewinności. Sprawa Tomka Komendy	Tomasz Komenda
2021	Arkadiusz Jakubik	Jak najdalej stąd	Marek Mazurek
2021	Maciej Musiałowski	Sala samobójców. Hejter	Tomasz Giemza
2021	Ivan Trojan	Szarlatan	Jan Mikolášek
2021	Andrzej Seweryn	Zieja	Priest Jan Zieja
2022	Maciej Stuhr	Powrót do tamtych dni	Alek
2022	Piotr Głowacki	Mistrz	Tadeusz Pietrzykowski
2022	Tomasz Ziętek	Żeby nie było śladów	Jurek Popiel
2022	Jacek Braciak	My Wonderful Life	Witek Lisiecki
2022	Robert Więckiewicz	Wesele	Rysiek Wilk
2023	Dawid Ogrodnik	Johnny	Jan Kaczkowski
2023	Ireneusz Czop	Broad Peak	Maciej Berbeka
2023	Tomasz Schuchardt	Chrzciny	Wojtek
2023	Jacek Beler	Inni ludzie	Kamil
2023	Piotr Trojan	Johnny	Patryk Galewski
2024	Eryk Kulm	Filip	Filip
2024	Jakub Gierszał	Doppelgänger. Sobowtór	Józef Wieczorek/Hans Steiner
2024	Bartosz Bielenia	Kos	Ignac Sikora
2024	Tomasz Włosok	Zielona Granica	Jan
2024	Leszek Lichota	Znachor	Prof. Rafał Wilczur/Antoni Kosiba
2025	Filip Pławiak	Biała odwaga	Jędrek Zawrat
2025	Jacek Borusiński	Wróbel	Remigiusz Wróbel
2025	Maciej Damięcki	Cisza nocna	Lucjan
2025	Marcin Dorociński	Minghun	Jurek
2025	Tomasz Włosok	Kulej. Dwie strony medalu	Jerzy Kulej
2026	Tomasz Schuchardt	Home Sweet Home	Grzesiek Nowak
2026	Bartłomiej Deklewa	No Ghosts on Good Street	Benek
2026	Eryk Kulm	Chopin, a Sonata in Paris	Frédéric Chopin
2026	Filip Wiłkomirski	Brother	Dawid Kamiński
2026	Idan Weiss	Franz	Franz Kafka

== Multiple awards and nominations ==
Wins	Actor	Nominations
3	Robert Więckiewicz	6
3	Dawid Ogrodnik	4
2	Janusz Gajos	6
2	Maciej Stuhr	4
2	Zbigniew Zamachowski	2
1	Jacek Braciak	3
1	Tomasz Kot	3
1	Tomasz Schuchardt	2
Eryk Kulm		2
0	Marcin Dorociński	6
0	Tomasz Włosok	2
