= Polish Film Academy =

- Formation: 2003
- Type: Film organization
- Headquarters: Warsaw, Poland
- Members: 609
- Leader: Dariusz Jabłoński
- Website: pnf.pl

The Polish Film Academy (Polish: Polska Akademia Filmowa) is a professional honorary organization dedicated to the advancement of the arts and sciences of motion pictures It was founded in 2003 and is based in Warsaw, led by filmmaker Dariusz Jabłoński.

The organization is not to be confused with Akademia Polskiego Filmu (also known as Polish Film Academy), an unrelated nationwide educational program launched in 2009 that offers a two-year course on the history of Polish feature cinema.

== History ==
The academy was founded in 2003 on the initiative of the Independent Film Foundation (Polish: Niezależna Fundacja Filmowa, NFF) and is a national film academy equivalent to other national academies awarding such prizes as French César Awards, Czech Lion Awards or Spanish Goya Awards.

It is composed of about 600 motion picture professionals from Poland. Membership in the Academy is by invitation only. Membership is based on being judged by all members – professional filmmakers as a nominated for distinguished achievements in filmmaking. The Academy organizes annual Polish Film Academy Awards, now officially known as The Eagle (Orzeł). In 2008 the first president of the Academy was Agnieszka Holland. The current president of the Academy is producer and director Dariusz Jabłoński.

== Members ==
- Witold Adamek
- Andrzej Albin
- Petro Aleksowski
- Janusz Anderman
- Dżamila Ankiewicz
- Michał Arabudzki
- Andrzej Artymowicz
- Fryderyk Babiński
- Wojciech Badiak
- Filip Bajon
- Albina Barańska
- Andrzej Barański
- Andrzej Barszczyński
- Jarosław Barzan
- Marcin Kot Bastkowski
- Krzysztof Baumiller
- Mateusz Bednarkiewicz
- Ryszard Ber
- Paweł Betley
- Czesław Białczyński
- Joanna Białousz
- Wojciech Biedroń
- Magdalena Biedrzycka
- Anna Biedrzycka-Sheppard
- Irena Biegańska
- Iwona Bielska
- Władysław Bielski
- Daniel Bloom
- Jerzy Blaszyński
- Jacek Bławut
- Katarzyna Boczek
- Jurek Bogajewicz
- Andrzej Bohdanowicz
- Anna Bohdziewicz-Jastrzębska
- Agnieszka Bojanowska
- Włodzimierz Bolecki
- Jacek Borcuch
- Mirosław Bork
- Ewa Borzęcka
- Jacek Braciak
- Lech Brański
- Małgorzata Braszka
- Ewa Braun
- Jacek Brettschneider
- Joszko Broda
- Jacek Bromski
- Ryszard Brylski
- Marek Burgemajster
- Stanisława Celińska
- Iga Cembrzyńska
- Stefan Chazbijewicz
- Maria Chilarecka-Barczyńska
- Tadeusz Chmielewski
- Filip Chodzewicz
- Stefan Chomnicki
- Irena Choryńska
- Marek Chrupała
- Andrzej Chyra
- Magdalena Cielecka
- Małgorzata Corvalan
- Franciszek Czekierda
- Robert Czesak
- Hanna Ćwikło
- Wojciech Danowski
- Grzegorz Daroń
- Wit Dąbal
- Jacek Dąbała
- Maciej Dejczer
- Dariusz Derbich
- Krzesimir Dębski
- Magdalena Dipont
- Mirosław Dobek
- Halina Dobrowolska
- Tomasz Dobrowolski
- Andrzej Domalik
- Barbara Domaradzka
- Piotr Domaradzki
- Tadeusz Drewno
- Maciej Drygas
- Michał Dudziewicz
- Piotr Dumała
- Krzysztof Dumieński
- Zygmunt Duś
- Maciej Dutkiewicz
- Jan Dworak
- Jolanta Dylewska
- Janusz Dymek
- Anna Dymna
- Katarzyna Dzida-Hamela
- Piotr Dzięcioł
- Marian Dziędziel
- Andrzej Dziurawiec
- Paweł Edelman
- Sławomir Fabicki
- Feliks Falk
- Jerzy Fidler
- Milenia Fiedler
- Piotr Figiel
- Katarzyna Figura
- Sławomir Fijałkowski
- Małgorzata Fogel-Gabryś
- Małgorzata Foremniak
- Jolanta Fraszyńska
- Jan Freda
- Barbara Fronc
- Jan Frycz
- Olga Frycz
- Renata Frydrych
- Jerzy Kajetan Frykowski
- Katarzyna Fukacz-Cebula
- Violetta Furmaniuk-Zaorska
- Dariusz Gajewski
- Janusz Gajos
- Janusz Gauer
- Jacek Gawryszczak
- Jacek Gąsiorowski
- Krzysztof Gierat
- Małgorzata Gil
- Przemysław Gintrowski
- Robert Gliński
- Krzysztof Globisz
- Włodzimierz Głodek
- Janusz Głowacki
- Robert Gonera
- Zbigniew Górny
- Andrzej Górny
- Paweł Grabarczyk
- Zbigniew Grabowski
- Grażyna Gradoń
- Krzysztof Gradowski
- Andrzej Grembowicz
- Krzysztof Grędziński
- Agnieszka Grochowska
- Teresa Gruber
- Janusz Grudziński
- Anna Gryczyńska
- Mariusz Grzegorzek
- Jolanta Grzenda
- Cezary Grzesiuk
- Maciej Grzywaczewski
- Gene Gutowski
- Małgorzata Gwiazdecka
- Jacek Gwizdała
- Andrzej Haliński
- Zbigniew Hałatek
- Jacek Hamela
- Piotr Hertel
- Jerzy Hoffman
- Agnieszka Holland
- Zbigniew Hołdys
- Jan Hryniak
- Sławomir Idziak
- Dorota Ignaczak
- Anna Iwaszkiewicz
- Urszula Jabłońska
- Mirosław Jabłoński
- Dariusz Jabłoński
- Monika Jagodzińska
- Andrzej Jakimowski
- Arkadiusz Jakubik
- Krystyna Janda
- Jagna Janicka
- Jerzy Janicki
- Jadwiga Jankowska-Cieślak
- Katarzyna Jarnuszkiewicz
- Marcin Jarnuszkiewicz
- Andrzej J. Jaroszewicz
- Grażyna Jasińska-Wiśniarowska
- Krzysztof Jastrząb
- Ewa Jastrzębska
- Małgorzata Jaworska
- Jerzy Jednorowski
- Andrzej Jeziorek
- Wojciech Jędrkiewicz
- Edyta Jungowska
- Wiesław Jurgała
- Jan A.P. Kaczmarek
- Zdzisław Kaczmarek
- Jan Kaczmarski
- Dorota Kamińska
- Violetta Kamińska
- Jarosław Kamiński
- Jerzy Kapuściński
- Kazimierz Karabasz
- Tomasz Karczewski
- Maciej Karpiński
- Andrzej Kawala
- Jerzy Kawalerowicz
- Grzegorz Kędzierski
- Dorota Kędzierzawska
- Mirosław Kęsiak
- Janusz Kidawa
- Jan Kidawa-Błoński
- Andrzej Kiełczewski
- Krzysztof Kiersznowski
- Wojciech Kilar
- Edward Kłosiński
- Hanna Kłoskowska
- Piotr Knop
- Grażyna Kociniak
- Krystyna Kofta
- Piotr Kokociński
- Jerzy Kolasa
- Jan Jakub Kolski
- Paweł Komorowski
- Barbara Komosińska
- Adrian Konarski
- Jacek Kondracki
- Marek Kondrat
- Zygmunt Konieczny
- Tadeusz Konwicki
- Joanna Kopczyńska
- Leszek Kopeć
- Jacek Koprowicz
- Jacek Korcelli
- Natalia Koryncka-Gruz
- Abel Korzeniowski
- Mikołaj Korzyński
- Andrzej Korzyński
- Tadeusz Kosarewicz
- Barbara Kosidowska
- Joanna Kos-Krauze
- Marcin Koszałka
- Łukasz Kośmicki
- Arkadiusz Kośmider
- Tomasz Kot
- Marek Koterski
- Andrzej Kotkowski
- Andrzej Kowal
- Cezary Kowalczuk
- Andrzej Kowalczyk
- Tomasz Kowalkowski
- Przemysław Kowalski
- Anna Kowarska
- Jan Kozikowski
- Grażyna Kozłowska
- Hanna Kramarczuk
- Anna Krasowska
- Antoni Krauze
- Krzysztof Krauze
- Ewa Krauze
- Grzegorz Królikiewicz
- Rafał Królikowski
- Agnieszka Krukówna
- Ryszard Krupa
- Waldemar Krzystek
- Marcin Krzyżanowski
- Dariusz Kuc
- Kamil Kuc
- Jerzy Kucia
- Grzegorz Kuczeriszka
- Wojciech Kuczok
- Zdzisław Kuczyński
- Mariusz Kuczyński
- Marek Kuczyński
- Boris F. Kudlička
- Błażej Kukla
- Elżbieta Kurkowska
- Kazimierz Kutz
- Henryk Kuźniak
- Stanisław Kuźnik
- Tatiana Kwiatkowska
- Michał Kwieciński
- Tadeusz Lampka
- Paweł Laskowski
- Stefan Laudyn
- Ryszard Lenczewski
- Wojciech Lepianka
- Elena Leszczyńska
- Witold Leszczyński
- Małgorzata Lewandowska
- Andrzej Lewandowski
- Konstanty Lewkowicz
- Bogusław Linda
- Jacek Lipski
- Olaf Lubaszenko
- Barbara Łagowska
- Antoni Łazarkiewicz
- Magdalena Łazarkiewicz
- Piotr Łazarkiewicz
- Ilona Łepkowska
- Grzegorz Łoszewski
- Paweł Łuczyc-Wyhowski
- Jerzy Łukaszewicz
- Mariusz Łukomski
- Małgorzata Łupina
- Ewa Machulska
- Juliusz Machulski
- Magdalena Maciejewska
- Maciej Maciejewski
- Katarzyna Maciejko-Kowalczyk
- Adam Magajewski
- Krzysztof Magowski
- Bronisław Maj
- Krzysztof Majchrzak
- Janusz Majewski
- Lech Majewski
- Paweł Mantorski
- Robert Mańkowski
- Wojciech Marczewski
- Weronika Marczuk-Pazura
- Jerzy Matuszkiewicz
- Maciej Melecki
- Ryszard Melliwa
- Norbert Mędlewski
- Jerzy R. Michaluk
- Tomasz Michałowski
- Mariusz Mielczarek
- Tomasz Miernowski
- Jacek Mierosławski
- Jerzy Mierzejewski
- Piotr Mikucki
- Marek Miller
- Paweł Mirowski
- Teresa Miziołek
- Jacek Ryszard Mocny
- Jacek Moczydłowski
- Jan Mogilnicki
- Andrzej Mol
- Jerzy Morawski
- Janusz Morgenstern
- Bogdan Mozer
- Leszek Możdżer
- Aleksander Mrożek
- Andrzej Mularczyk
- Paweł Mykietyn
- Zdzisław Najda
- Joanna Napieralska
- Halina Nawrocka
- Zbigniew Niciński
- Włodzimierz Niderhaus
- Wojciech Niżyński
- Wojciech Nowak
- Grzegorz Nowak
- Barbara Nowak
- Leopold René Nowak
- Maria Nowakowska-Majcher
- Marek Nowakowski
- Marek Nowicki
- Marek Nowowiejski
- Ryszard Maciej Nyczka
- Małgorzata Orłowska
- Sławomir Orzechowski
- Jacek Osadowski
- Krzysztof Osiecki
- Zbigniew Osiński
- Dominika Ostałowska
- Waldemar Ostanówko
- Barbara Ostapowicz
- Maja Ostaszewska
- Dorota Ostrowska-Orlińska
- Grzegorz Pacek
- Krzysztof Pakulski
- Dariusz Panas
- Ryszard Patkowski
- Jan Kanty Pawluśkiewicz
- Barbara Pec-Ślesicka
- Jan Peszek
- Ewa Petelska
- Jacek Petrycki
- Jerzy Pękalski
- Grzegorz Piątkowski
- Franciszek Pieczka
- Magdalena Piekorz
- Andrzej Piekutowski
- Krzysztof Piesiewicz
- Marek Piestrak
- Leszek Pieszko
- Dariusz Pietrykowski
- Stefan Pindelski
- Radosław Piwowarski
- Marek Piwowski
- Roman Polański
- Andrzej Połeć
- Czesław Paweł Poppe
- Marcin Pospieszalski
- Kinga Preis
- Ola Prószyńska
- Halina Prugar-Ketling
- Krzysztof Ptak
- Krzysztof Raczyński
- Elżbieta Radke
- Stanisław Radwan
- Artur Radźko
- Zbigniew Raj
- Paweł Rakowski
- Andrzej Ramlau
- Jolanta Raszyńska
- Edward Redliński
- Artur Reinhart
- Piotr Reisch
- Sławomir Rogowski
- Ewa Romanowska-Różewicz
- Henryk Romanowski
- Józef Romasz
- Dorota Roqueplo
- Michał Rosa
- Janusz Rosół
- Roland Rowiński
- Kazimierz Rozwałka
- Małgorzata Rożniatowska
- Stanisław Różewicz
- Agnieszka Różycka
- Wanda Różycka-Zborowska
- Andrzej Różycki
- Piotr Rubik
- Katarzyna Rudnik
- Magdalena Rutkiewicz-Luterek
- Natalia Rybicka
- Andrzej Rychcik
- Zbigniew Safjan
- Monika Sajko-Gradowska
- Sławomir Salamon
- Wojciech Saloni-Marczewski
- Jarosław Sander
- Wiesław Saniewski
- Barbara Sass
- Jerzy Satanowski
- Anna Seitz-Wichłacz
- Andrzej Serdiukow
- Andrzej Seweryn
- Ryszard Sibilski
- Dariusz Sidor
- Adam Sikora
- Ireneusz Siwiński
- Ewa Skoczkowska
- Jerzy Skolimowski
- Jerzy Skrepiński
- Józef Skrzek
- Przemysław Skwirczyński
- Ewa Smal
- Wojciech Smarzowski
- Barbara Snarska
- Katarzyna Sobańska
- Witold Sobociński
- Anna Sokołowska-Korcelli
- Jacek Sokołowski
- Bogdan Solle
- Janusz Sosnowski
- Jacek Stachlewski
- Tomasz Stańko
- Wiesława Starska
- Allan Starski
- Piotr Starzak
- Joanna Stasiak-Szafrańska
- Małgorzata Stefaniak
- Andrzej Stempowski
- Danuta Stenka
- Janusz Stokłosa
- Justyna Stolarz
- Anna Strońska
- Irena Strzałkowska
- Maciej Strzembosz
- Maciej Stuhr
- Jerzy Stuhr
- Bolesław Sulik
- Roman Suszyński
- Dariusz Szafrański
- Grażyna Szapołowska
- Waldemar Szarek
- Jerzy Szebesta
- Andrzej Szenajch
- Konrad Szołajski
- Krzysztof Szpetmański
- Jerzy Sztwiertnia
- Piotr Szulkin
- Andrzej Szulkowski
- Borys Szyc
- Włodzimierz Śliwiński
- Paweł Śmietanka
- Jerzy Śnieżawski
- Barbara Śródka-Makówka
- Julita Świercz-Wieczyńska
- Anna Świerkocka
- Maciej Świerkocki
- Tomasz Tarasin
- Kazimierz Tarnas
- Roman Tarwacki
- Marian Terlecki
- Magdalena Tesławska
- Wojciech Todorow
- Arkadiusz Tomiak
- Bartłomiej Topa
- Jerzy Trela
- Marek Trojak
- Piotr Trzaskalski
- Zbigniew Trzciński
- Andrzej Trześniewski
- Andrzej Trzos-Rastawiecki
- Jacek Turewicz
- Leszek Turowski
- Krzysztof Tusiewicz
- Tymon Tymański
- Wojciech Waglewski
- Anna Wagner
- Witold Wajcht
- Andrzej Wajda
- Aleksander Walczak
- Rafał Waltenberger
- Grzegorz Warchoł
- Janusz Wąchała
- Paweł Wendorff
- Piotr Wereśniak
- Zbigniew Wichłacz
- Rafał Wieczyński
- Piotr Wierzejski
- Maria Wiłun
- Tomasz Wiszniewski
- Ewa Wiśniewska
- Robert Wiśniewski
- Sławomir Witczak
- Renata Własow-Skóra
- Jolanta Włodarczyk
- Rafał Wnuk
- Krzysztof Wodziński
- Przemysław Wojcieszek
- Piotr Wojtowicz
- Andrzej Wolf
- Nikodem Wołk-Łaniewski
- Leszek Wosiewicz
- Izabela Woźny
- Izabela Wójcik
- Jerzy Wójcik
- Wojciech Wójcik
- Marek Wronko
- Janusz Wróblewski
- Waldemar Wróblewski
- Anna Wunderlich
- Andrzej Wyrozębski
- Janusz Yanina Iwański
- Małgorzata Zacharska
- Krystyna Zachwatowicz
- Jadwiga Zajicek
- Zbigniew Zamachowski
- Krzysztof Zanussi
- Janusz Zaorski
- Zbigniew Zapasiewicz
- Ernest Zawada
- Dariusz Zawiślak
- Wanda Zeman
- Maciej Zieliński
- Wojciech Zimiński
- Iwona Ziułkowska-Okapiec
- Maria Zmarz-Koczanowicz
- Wiesław Znyk
- Filip Zylber
- Andrzej Żabicki
- Jarosław Żamojda
- Michał Żarnecki
- Michał Żebrowski
- Edward Żebrowski
- Zbigniew Żmigrodzki
- Wojciech Żogała
- Zofia Żydaczewska
- Marek Żydowicz

== See also ==
- Cinema of Poland
- Gdynia Film Festival
- Warsaw Film Festival
