= Jacek Poniedziałek =

Polish actor

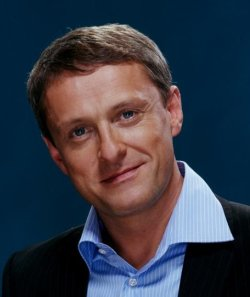
- Jacek Poniedziałek in 2008
- Born: 6 August 1965 (age 60); Kraków, Poland
- Occupations: Actor and theatre director
- Years active: 1990–present

Jacek Poniedziałek (born 6 August 1965, Kraków) is a Polish film, theatre and television actor as well as a theatre director and translator.

== Life and career ==
He was born on 6 August 1965 in Kraków and grew up in the city's Olsza II District. In 1990, he graduated from the National Academy of Theatre Arts in Kraków. He received his diploma on the basis of his performance in the role of Walter in Robert Musil's Early Drafts for The Man Without Qualities directed by Krystian Lupa. During his studies in Kraków, he began his long collaboration with theatre director Krzysztof Warlikowski. He was hired by the German director Karin Beier for his staging of Shakespeare's A Midsummer Night's Dream in a theatre in Düsseldorf. He performed at such institutions as the KTO Theatre in Kraków, the Juliusz Słowacki Theatre (1990–1992) and the Old Theatre (1992–1997). In 1997, he started working at the National Theatre in Warsaw. Between 1999 and 2006, he performed at the Variety Theatre and since 2008, he has been working at the New Theatre in Warsaw.

He also directed a number of plays such as Enter. Slamowana i śpiewana historia miłosna między dwoma mężczyznami, których dzieli bardzo wiele (New Theatre in Warsaw, 2010), Cat on a Hot Tin Roof (People's Theatre in Kraków, 2013) and The Glass Menagerie (Jan Kochanowski Theatre in Opole, 2014) by Tennessee Williams and Who's Afraid of Virginia Woolf? by Edward Albee (Polonia Theatre in Warsaw, 2016).

He made his film debut in 1999 by appearing in Stanisław Kuźnik's film Moja Angelika. He also starred in such films as Borys Lankosz's Reverse (2009), Jerzy Hoffman's Battle of Warsaw 1920 (2011), Grzegorz Królikiewicz's Sąsiady (2014), Borys Lankosz's Ziarno prawdy (2015) and Krzysztof Zanussi's Eter (2018).

He has also translated a number of stage plays into Polish including Sarah Kane's Cleansed (2001), Hanoch Levin's Krum (2005), Tony Kushner's Angels in America (2007), Tennessee Williams's A Streetcar Named Desire (2010) and Bernard-Marie Koltès's The End (2010).

== Personal life ==
He has a sister Anna (b. 1964) and he had two brothers Bolesław (1954–2014) and Józef (1956–1976). In the 1980s, he was fascinated by Polish rock band Maanam and at the age of 17, he met and befriended its lead singer Kora. At high school, he set up an amateur theatre with his friends where they staged Andrzej Bursa's Count Cagliostro's Animals. His academic teachers were Jan Peszek, Krzysztof Globisz and Jerzy Stuhr.

In 2005, he publicly came out as gay. He was in an 18-year long relationship with theatre director Krzysztof Warlikowski. In 2019, he took part in a social campaign Stoję po stronie młodzieży launched by Campaign Against Homophobia and a photo shoot for the Replika gay magazine.

== Appearances in television and film ==
- 1999: Moja Angelika as Alek
- 2000–2008: M jak miłość as Rafał Lubomski
- 2001–2002: Marzenia do spełnienia as an agency worker
- 2003: Przemiany as Snaut
- 2004: Trzeci as Paweł
- 2005: Magda M. as Rafał Żywiecki
- 2007: Ekipa as Wojciech Wandurski
- 2008: Boisko bezdomnych as a priest
- 2008: Hela w opałach as Eryk Krzyżanowski
- 2008: Izolator (Warsaw Dark) as Remik
- 2008: 39 i pół as Kundel
- 2009: Na Wspólnej as Nowicki
- 2009: Reverse as a dignitary
- 2010: Klub szalonych dziewic as Jan Szwarc
- 2011: Battle of Warsaw 1920 as Józef Haller
- 2014: Sąsiady as husband
- 2014: Na krawędzi 2 as Jakub Rokosz
- 2015: Ziarno prawdy as Klejnocki
- 2018: Druga szansa as Marek Strzałkiewicz
- 2018: Eter as Doctor
- 2019: Pod powierzchnią as attorney Kot
- 2021: The Defence
- 2022: Hold Tight
- 2024: Boxer

== See also ==
- Polish cinema
- Polish theatre
- Polish Film Awards
