= Dominika Ostałowska =

Polish actress (born 1971)

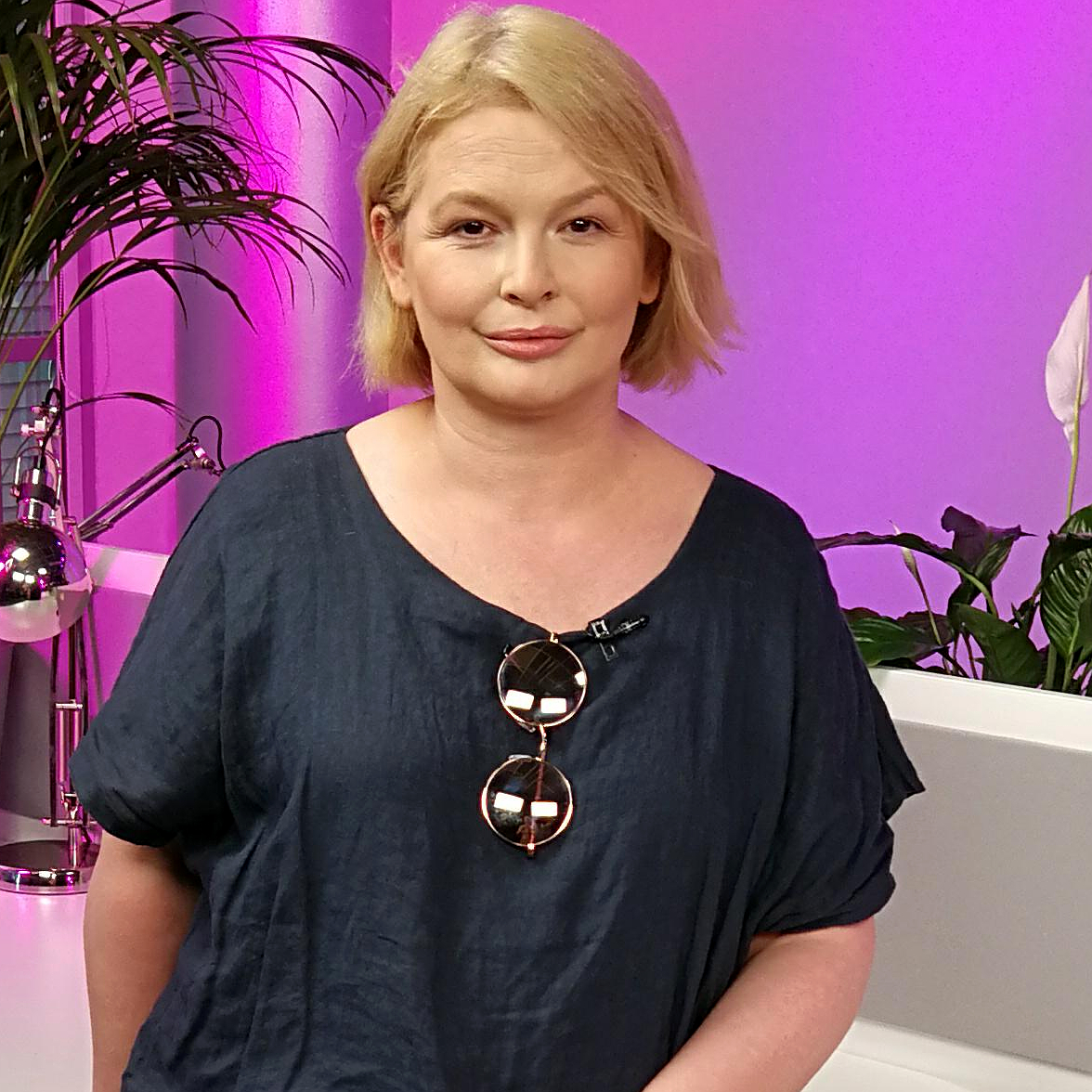
- Ostałowska in 2017
- Born: 18 February 1971 (age 55); Warsaw, Poland
- Occupation: Actress
- Years active: 1983–present

Dominika Ostałowska (born 18 February 1971, Warsaw) is a Polish film, television and theatre actress. She is a two-time winner of Polish Film Awards for Best Actress for her performance in a 2000 film Keep Away from the Window and for Best Supporting Actress for her role in a 2003 film Warsaw.

== Life and career ==
She was born on 21 February 1971 in Warsaw to father Ryszard Ostałowski and mother Irena. She graduated from the Adam Mickiewicz High School No. 4 in Warsaw. In 1994, she graduated from the National Academy of Dramatic Art in Warsaw.

Between 1994–2000, she worked at the Warsaw's Ateneum Theatre and between 2000–2012 at the Powszechny Theatre. Since 2012, she has been working at the Stanisław Ignacy Witkiewicz Studio Theatre.

Her most critically acclaimed roles come from Mariusz Treliński's 1995 film Łagodna based on a short story by Fyodor Dostoyevsky; Jerzy Stuhr's 1997 film Love Stories, Lech Majewski's 1999 biopic Wojaczek and Jan Jakub Kolski's 2000 war film Keep Away from the Window based on Hanna Krall's short story Ta z Hamburga (The One From Hamburg). She also achieved great popularity by playing the character of Marta in a TV soap opera M jak miłość. In 2009, she was a member of jury at the 34th Gdynia Film Festival. In 2012, she hosted the Tajemnice Rezydencji TV programme.

== Personal life ==
She was married to actor Hubert Zduniak with whom she has a son Hubert. She was also married to film director Mariusz Malec. She is known for her involvement in social campaigns against stalking. In 2013, she became an ambassador of the campaign Stop Stalking.

== Appearances in film and television ==
- 1994: Blood of the Innocent as Sonia
- 1995: Łagodna as wife
- 1997: The Witman Boys as Iren
- 1997: An Air So Pure as a maid
- 1997: Dusza śpiewa as Adam's wife
- 1997: Musisz żyć jako Agnieszka, as a daughter of the Hyńczak family
- 1997: Historie miłosne as Ewa Bielska
- 1997: Drugi brzeg as Henrietta Vogel
- 1997: Boża podszewka as Anusia Jurewicz
- 1998: Złoto dezerterów as a bank guard
- 1999: Wojaczek as Mała
- 1999: Rodzina zastępcza as a teacher (episode 14)
- since 2000: M jak miłość as Marta Wojciechowska-Budzyńska
- 2000: Keep Away from the Window as Regina Lilienstern
- 2002: Miss mokrego podkoszulka as Magda
- 2003: Warszawa as Wiktoria
- 2006: Nadzieja as Franciszek's mother
- 2006: Norymberga as a journalist
- 2007: Regina as Regina
- 2007: Kryminalni as Magda Leszczyńska (episode 87)
- 2007: Ekipa as Karolina Jabłonowska (episodes 7 and 14)
- 2008: Rodzina zastępcza as herself (episode 286)
- 2009: Projekt dziecko, czyli ojciec potrzebny od zaraz as Anna Nowak
- 2009: Co mówią lekarze as Joanna Knap
- 2011: Głęboka woda as Wioletta, Karolina's mother (episode 2)
- 2013: Prawo Agaty as Barbara Król (episode 46)
- 2013: Hotel 52 as Nina Richter (episode 84)
- 2014: O mnie się nie martw as Elżbieta Kosowska (episode 2)
- 2015: Prokurator as Anna Falkowska (episode 6)
- 2015: Na dobre i na złe as Weronika's mother (episodes 609, 610 and 612)
- 2015: Historia Roja as Countess Gąsowska (episode 5)
- 2016: Historia Roja as Countess Gąsowska
- 2017: Ojciec Mateusz as Urszula Jaskólska (episode 235)
- 2018–2019: Przyjaciółki as Olga Bratkowska
- 2019: Echo serca as Justyna Bogucka (episode 12)
- 2020: Angel of Death as Teresa Sznajder
- 2024: Chopin, Chopin! as Madame Wodzińska

== See also ==
- Polish cinema
- Polish Film Awards
