= Maciej Stuhr =

Polish actor (born 1975)

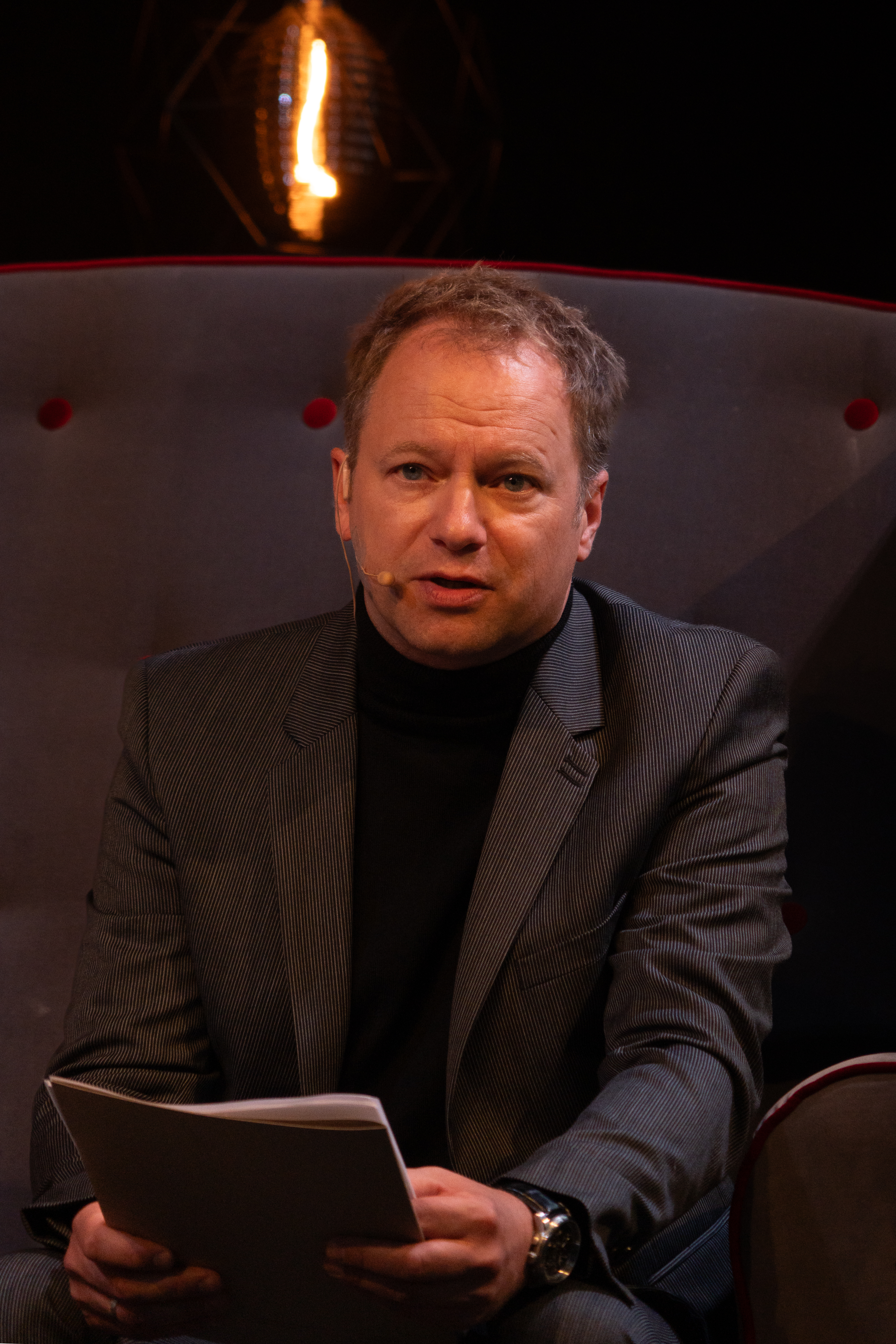
- Stuhr in 2024
- Born: Maciej Jerzy Stuhr; 23 June 1975 (age 51); Kraków, Poland
- Occupations: Actor, comedian
- Spouses: Samanta Janas (m. 1999; div. 2014) Katarzyna Błażejewska (m. 2015)
- Children: 2

Maciej Jerzy Stuhr (born 23 June 1975) is a Polish actor, comedian and occasional film director. In 2022, he was the recipient of the Polish Academy Award for Best Actor.

== Life and career ==
In 1999, he majored in psychology from the Jagiellonian University before moving on to study acting at Kraków's National Academy of Theatre Arts, which he finished in 2003. He became known for his impressions of Polish actors and performers, such as Gustaw Holoubek and he established the cabaret Po Żarcie, where he wrote most of the material. In 2013, he received the Polish Film Award for Best Actor for his role in Władysław Pasikowski's drama film Aftermath.

Among others, he is known for his role of Kuba Brenner in Chłopaki nie płaczą (Boys Don't Cry) and Piotr in Krzysztof Kieślowski's Decalogue X.

In 2006, he was a co-host, alongside Sophie Marceau, of the 19th European Film Awards held in Warsaw. Since 2008, he's been a member of Nowy Teatr, led by artistic director Krzysztof Warlikowski. The same year, he was awarded the Zbigniew Cybulski Award for best young actor.

== Personal life ==
He is the son of actor Jerzy Stuhr and violinist Barbara Kóska. He has a younger sister named Marianna (born 1982). His ancestors came to Kraków from Lower Austria in 1879. In 2015, he married Katarzyna Błażejewska.

He is also notable for his support of the LGBT community in Poland, working with Campaign Against Homophobia.

== Selected filmography ==
Film
Year	Title	Role	Notes
1988	Decalogue X	Piotr	
1991	V.I.P.	Child	
1991	Les Enfants du Vent	Olek	
1993	Uprowadzenie Agaty	Journalist	
1997	Love Stories	Student Ikonowicz	
1999	Chłopaki nie płaczą	Kuba Brenner	
1999	Krugerandy	Panicz	
1999	Fuks	Aleks	
1999	O dwóch takich, co nic nie ukradli	Kiciuś	
1999	Wszystkie pieniądze świata	Burek	
2001	The Spring to Come	Hipolit	
2001	Julie Walking Home	Piotr	
2001	Poranek kojota	Kuba	
2001	Wszyscy święci		
2003	Baśń o ludziach stąd	Newton	
2003	Tomorrow's Weather	Son	
2004	The Wedding	Mateusz	
2004	Glina	Artur Banaś	
2005	Solidarność, Solidarność...	Tomek	
2006	Fundacja	Darek Koliba	
2006	Francuski numer	Chwastek	
2007	Testosterone	Sebastian Tretyn	
2007	Korowód	Tomek	
2007	Wino truskawkowe	Janek	
2008	33 Scenes from Life	Piotr, husband of Julia	
2008	Glina 2	Artur Banaś	
2009	Operacja Dunaj	Florian	
2009	Mistyfikacja	Łazowski	
2010	Śluby panieńskie	Gustaw	
2011	Daas	Joseph II	
2011	Listy do M.	Mikołaj (Santa)	
2012	Obława	Henryk Kondolewiz	
2012	Pokłosie	Józek Kalina	
2012	Traffic Department	Zaręba	
2013	Walesa. Man of Hope	Priest	
2016	Planet Single	Tomek	
2016-2017, 2023	Belfer	Paweł Zawadzki	Lead role
2018	Planet Single 2	Tomek	
2018	Juliusz	Damian	
2020	The Hater	Paweł Rudnicki	
2020	Angel of Death	Piotr Wolnicki	
2021	Return to Legoland	Alek	
2024	Inheritance	Dawid Kłos	
2026	The Doll	Michał Szuman	
