= AST National Academy of Theatre Arts in Kraków =

Drama school in Poland

Coordinates: 50°3′36″N 19°55′56″E

AST National Academy of Theatre Arts
- Akademia Sztuk Teatralnych im. Stanisława Wyspiańskiego w Krakowie
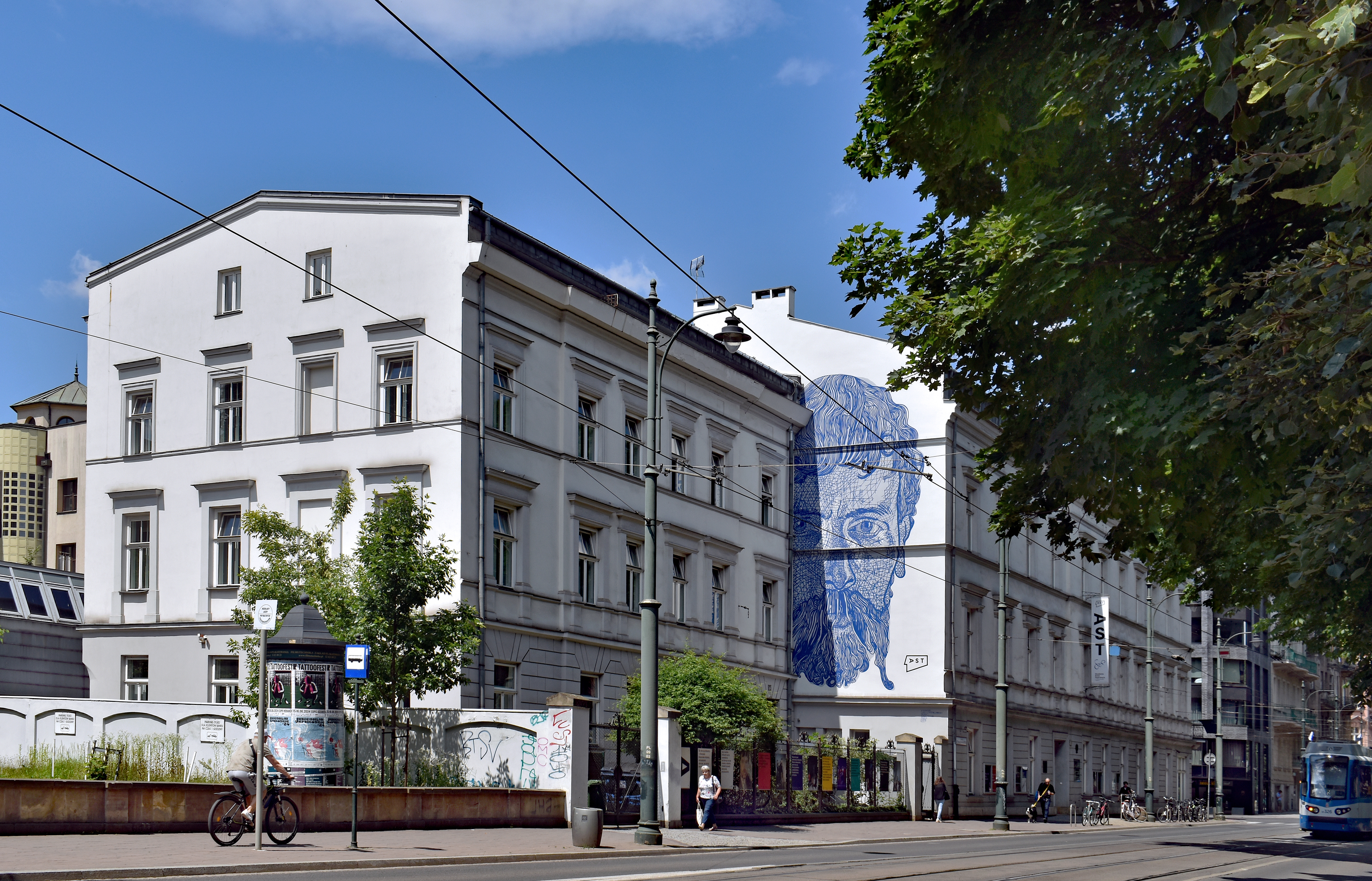
- Type: Public
- Established: 1946
- Rector: Grzegorz Mielczarek
- Location: ul. Straszewskiego 21-22, 31-109, Kraków, Poland
- Campus: *Faculty of Acting (Kraków); Faculty of Theatre Directing (Kraków); Faculty of Acting and Puppetry (Wrocław); Faculty of Dance Theatre (Bytom)
- Website: https://www.ast.krakow.pl/

AST National Academy of Theatre Arts (Polish: Akademia Sztuk Teatralnych w Krakowie, often shortened to AST) is a drama school based in Kraków and Wrocław, Poland. It was founded in 1946 by actor Juliusz Osterwa, who took the initial steps leading to the establishment of the Academy through the amalgamation of three local studios; Stary Teatr, the Słowacki Theatre, and Iwo Gall's Dramatic Studio.

== History ==
The history of the Ludwik Solski Academy began in 1946 with a three-year training course in drama for prospective actors. In 1949 the name of the school was changed to the State College of Acting (Państwowa Wyższa Szkoła Aktorska), and the curriculum extended to four years. Its current name, the Państwowa Wyższa Szkoła Teatralna, was determined in 1955. From 1954 to 1964 the college also provided courses in puppetry and the puppet theatre, reactivated in 1972 as an independent Puppet Theatre Faculty located in the city of Wrocław.

The new Faculty of Directing was created in 1955 and continued in its original form till 1962. In 1973 the Faculty was re-established as the Faculty of Play Directing with several students pursuing a four-year programme. The next important stage in the development of the Academy was the establishment in 1979 of the Actors' Faculty in Wrocław.

In October 2017 the name of the school was changed to the AST National Academy of Theatre Arts in Kraków. The academy patron was also changed. Currently the patron is a playwright, painter and poet Stanisław Wyspiański (Akademia Sztuk Teatralnych im. Stanisława Wyspiańskiego w Krakowie).

From its beginnings the Academy for the Dramatic Arts was run by some of the most prominent Polish dramatic artists, Juliusz Osterwa, Tadeusz Burnatowicz, Władysław Woźnik, Eugeniusz Fulde, Bronisław Dąbrowski, Jerzy Krasowski, Danuta Michałowska, Jerzy Trela, and Jerzy Stuhr. The Academy's history was shaped by outstanding teachers and trainers as well as by famous theoreticians, including its own graduates who have made a substantial impact on the theatre scene in Poland and abroad. The following celebrities have also conducted practical classes in acting, directing and music: Jerzy Jarocki, Tadeusz Kantor, Mieczysław Kotlarczyk, Władysław Krzemiński, Ewa Lasek, Krystian Lupa, Krzysztof Penderecki, Anna Polony, Krystyna Skuszanka, Marta Stebnicka, Konrad Swinarski, and Roman Zawistowski. Many of these artists are still teaching at the Academy. The most important directors in the last two decades have been predominantly graduates of the school: in the 1990s these included Krystian Lupa and Mikolaj Grabowski's students Krzysztof Warlikowski, Grzegorz Jarzyna, Anna Augustynowicz and Paweł Miskiewicz, and in the 2000s (decade), directors Maja Kleczewska, Jan Klata and Michal Zadara.

Some of the Academy's more outstanding graduates in its first decade included Zbigniew Cybulski, Jerzy Grotowski, Leszek Herdegen, Gustaw Holoubek, Jerzy Jarocki, Bogumił Kobiela, and Halina Mikołajska, while subsequent decades produced further prominent alumni: Jerzy Bińczycki, Teresa Budzisz-Krzyżanowska, Ewa Demarczyk, Jan Nowicki, Jan Peszek, Anna Polony, Maciej Prus, Wojciech Pszoniak, Anna Seniuk, Jerzy Stuhr, and Marek Walczewski. Many of its students and graduates have been involved with the emergence of new dramatic initiatives, such as the establishment of Teatr STU and the Witkacy Theatre in Zakopane.

From its early years the Ludwik Solski Academy was a source of continuity for the Polish theatre thanks to the fact that its teaching staff often belonged to different generations including actors from before the Second World War, with many of them (i.e. Tadeusz Burnatowicz, Halina Gallowa, Władysław Krzemiński, Wacław Nowakowski and Władysław Woźnik) completing drama courses in prewar Poland. Close ties with the local theatre scene defined the unique character of the school from the very start. This uniqueness has been maintained even during the difficult period of the 1950s, when the authorities and the Soviet training model barred students from active participation in professional theatre. The directives of the Stalinist Ministry of Culture marked the introduction of Socialist Realism in a schematic and vulgarized way. The repertoire of the Academy was narrowed down mostly to Russian and Soviet drama with no contemporary Western plays whatsoever. The repressive political climate lasted until after the Polish October of 1956.

Close links to the leading theatres in Kraków contribute to the Academy's status. There is a direct correlation between the condition of the city's theatres and the condition of the Academy with staff composed of a fair number of Cracovian theatre personalities whose views on drama and the teaching methods cover a wide range of philosophies. In recent years, the school has opened a new department of theatre dramaturgy.

== Organizational structure ==
Faculties

- Faculty of Acting in Kraków
  - Department of Dramatic Acting
  - Department of Concert Singing and Acting
  - Department of Dance Theatre
- Faculty of Theatre Directing in Kraków
  - Department of Theatre Directing
  - Department of Theatre Dramaturgy
  - Department of Puppet Theatre Directing
- Faculty in Wrocław
  - Department of Acting
  - Department of Puppetry
  - Postgraduate study of Children's Theatre Directing

== Enrollment ==
At present the Academy recruits new students for the Actors' Faculties in Kraków and Wrocław, the Faculty of Play Directing in Kraków, and the Puppet Theatre Faculty in Wrocław. Since 1946 well over a thousand students have graduated from the Ludwik Solski Academy, and found employment on theatre stages in Poland and abroad.

== Notable alumni ==
- Tamara Arciuch
- Bartosz Bielenia
- Alicja Bobrowska
- Zbigniew Cybulski
- Paweł Deląg
- Bartłomiej Deklewa
- Ewa Demarczyk
- Anna Dymna
- Marian Dziędziel
- Jan Frycz
- Roma Gąsiorowska
- Jakub Gierszał
- Krzysztof Globisz
- Andrzej Grabowski
- Jerzy Grotowski
- Jan Güntner
- Vitalik Havryla
- Gustaw Holoubek
- Kalina Jędrusik
- Tomasz Karolak
- Tomasz Kot
- Julia Krynke
- Barbara Kurzaj
- Jan Nowicki
- Łukasz Nowicki
- Maja Ostaszewska
- Jan Peszek
- Krzysztof Pieczyński
- Jacek Poniedziałek
- Wojciech Pszoniak
- Mikołaj Roznerski
- Maciej Stuhr
- Jerzy Trela
- Krzysztof Warlikowski
- Wiesław Wójcik
- Jerzy Złotnicki

== See also ==
- Polish theatre
- Teatr Narodowy
- Juliusz Słowacki Theatre
- Culture of Kraków
