= Tomorrow's Weather =

2003 film directed by Jerzy Stuhr

- Directed by: Jerzy Stuhr
- Written by: Mieczysław Herba; Jerzy Stuhr
- Produced by: Juliusz Machulski
- Starring: Jerzy Stuhr
- Cinematography: Edward Kłosiński
- Edited by: Elżbieta Kurkowska
- Music by: Abel Korzeniowski
- Release date: 3 October 2003
- Running time: 94 minutes
- Country: Poland
- Language: Polish

Tomorrow's Weather (Polish: Pogoda na jutro) is a 2003 Polish comedy-drama film co-written and directed by Jerzy Stuhr, who also plays the leading role. It is about a Polish dissident who has lived in a monastery for 17 years, and experiences cultural clash when he returns to his family in post-communist Poland.

Filming took place 11–29 March and 29 April–16 May 2003 in Warsaw and at the Dominican monastery of Kraków. The film was released in Polish cinemas on 3 October 2003.

Robert Koehler of Variety wrote that the film "jabs at nouveau capitalism, the media and youth culture" but "goes overboard itself, with a lunge toward Swiftian satire that frustratingly tends to hold back the laughs".

== Cast ==
- Jerzy Stuhr as Józef Kozioł
- Małgorzata Zajączkowska as Renata Kozioł
- Roma Gąsiorowska as Kinga Kozioł
- Barbara Kałużna as Ola "Claudia" Kozioł
- Maciej Stuhr as Marcin Kozioł
