= Konrad Swinarski =

Polish theatre director (1929–1975)

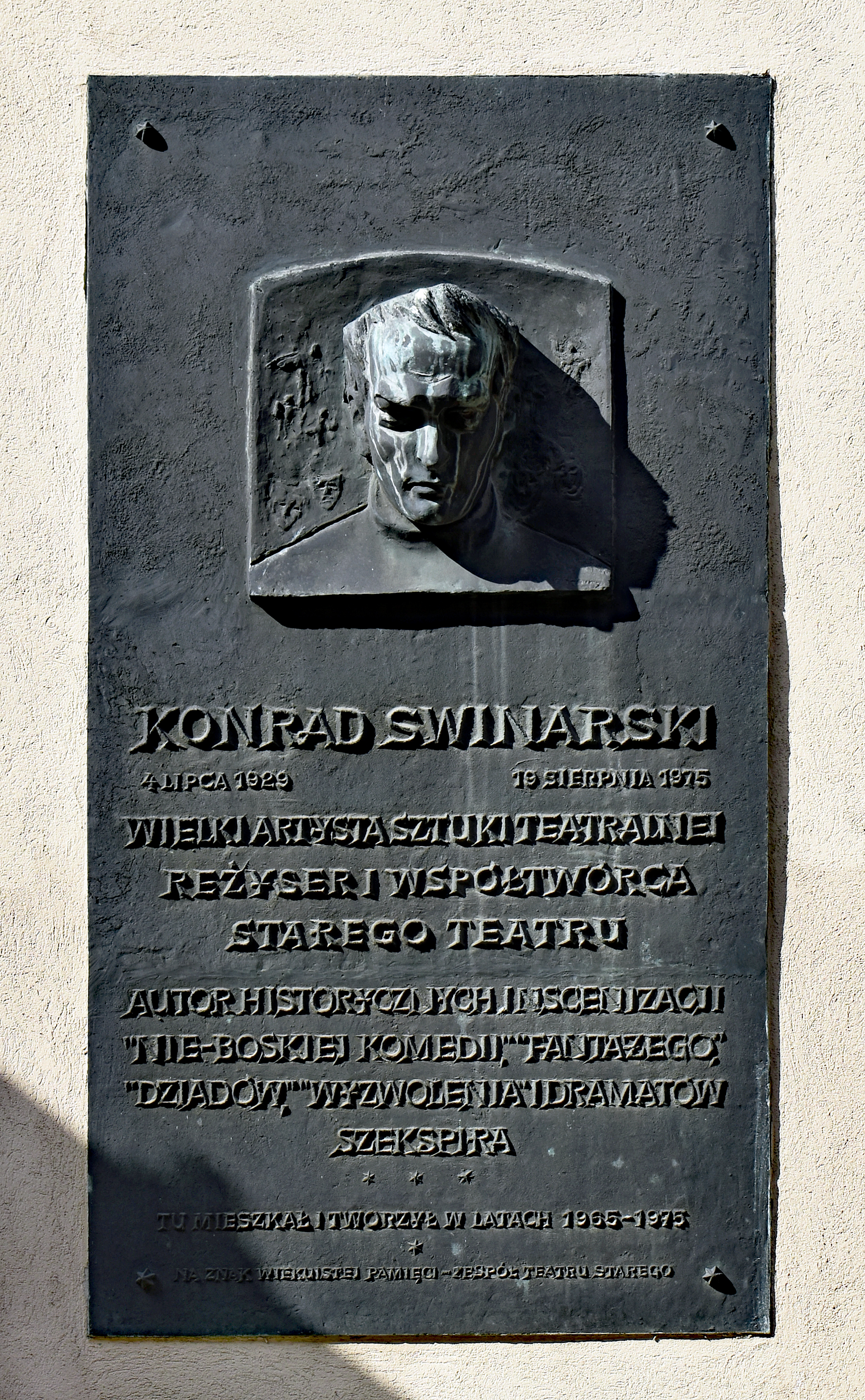
- Konrad Swinarski commemorative plaque on Kraków Stary Theatre building
- Born: 4 July 1929; Warsaw
- Died: 19 August 1975 (aged 46); Damascus
- Occupations: theatrical, television, film and opera director, stage designer, lecturer/instructor
- Years active: 1955–1975
- Employer: National Stary Theatre
- Spouse: Barbara Witek
- Awards: Second Degree Award of the Minister of Culture and Art, City of Kraków Award, First Degree State Award, "Drożdże" (Yeast) award of Polityka
- Honours: Knights Cross Order of Polonia Restituta, Golden Cross of Merit

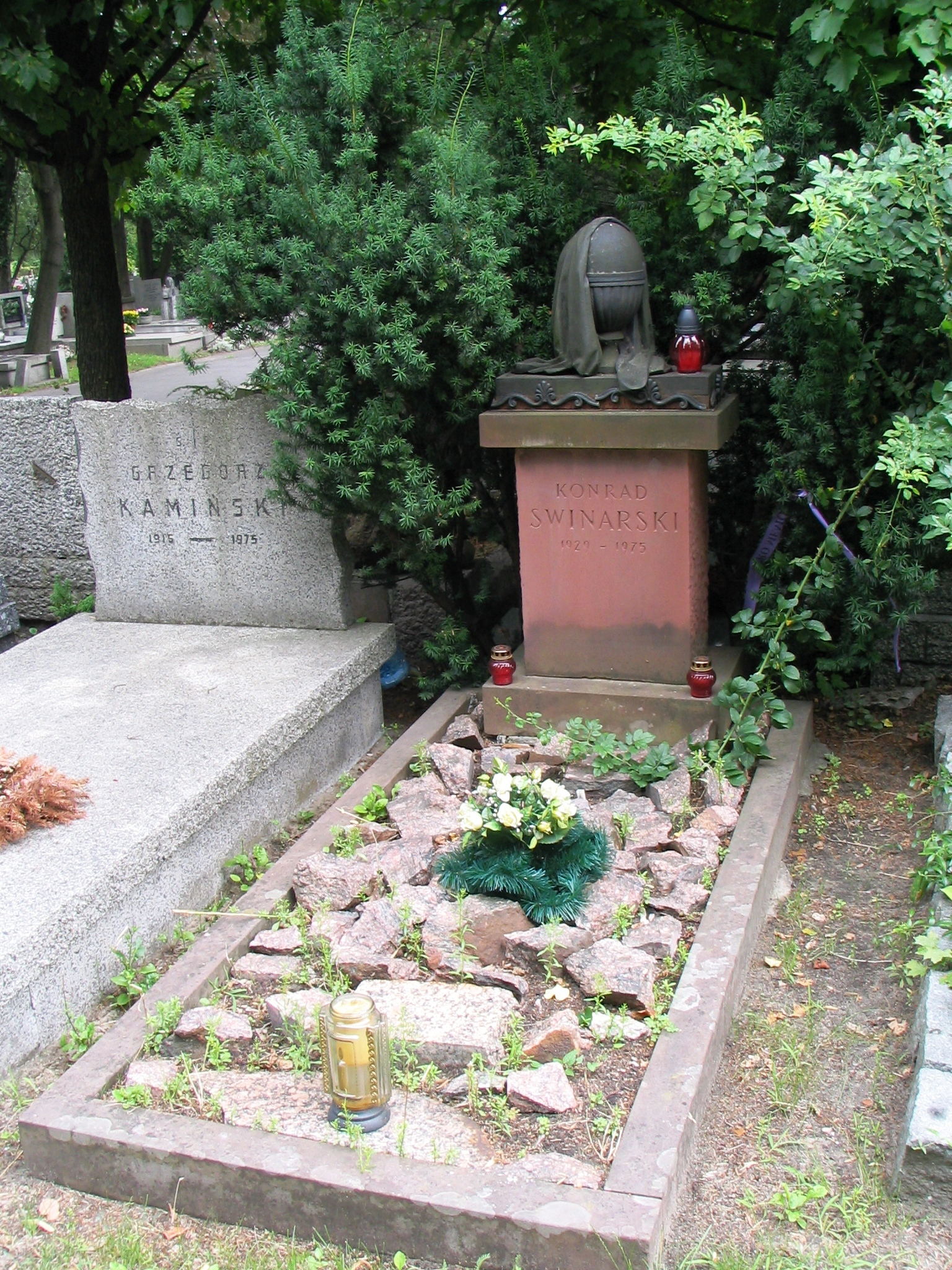
Swinarski's grave at Powązki Military Cemetery, 23 July 2008

Konrad Ksawery Swinarski (4 July 1929 – 19 August 1975) was a Polish theatrical, television, film and opera director and stage designer.

He has created his own style, thanks to which he is considered one of the most original and outstanding artists in the history of Polish theatre. He influenced many Polish directors, such as Jerzy Grzegorzewski, Krystian Lupa, Jerzy Jarocki, Maciej Prus, Grzegorz Jarzyna and Krzysztof Warlikowski.

== Life ==
His father was lieutenant colonel Karol Świnarski, and his mother was Irmgarda Liczbińska, who came from a Polish-German Silesian family. Born in Warsaw, Swinarski studied at Academy of Fine Arts in Katowice and Sopot, faculty of scenic visuals of Academy of Fine Arts In Łódź and Drama Direction Faculty of National Academy of Dramatic Art in Warsaw. During Warsaw studies he was an assistant to directors Bohdan Korzeniewski and Erwin Axer. He finished studying in 1955, but graduated in 1972 based on A Midsummer Night's Dream production in National Stary Theatre. In 1973–1975 he was a lecturer of National Academy of Theatre Arts in Kraków.

During studies he became fascinated and worked with Bertolt Brecht. In 1954, together with Przemysław Zieliński he realized Señora Carrar's Rifles for New Warsaw's theatre.

He debuted solo by directing Żeglarz (The Sailor) by Jerzy Szaniawski, premiering 14 May 1955 in Wojciech Bogusławski Theatre in Kalisz. From 1955 until 1957 he interned for Berliner Ensemble as Brecht's assistant. Together with other assistants he took part in finishing staging of Fear and Misery of the Third Reich, started by Brecht before his death on 14 August 1956.

Returning to Poland, Swinarski directed plays in Warsaw theatres: Dramatyczny, Współczesny, Ateneum and National Theatre and Gdańsk Wybrzeże Theatre. He also directed plays abroad, e.g. in West Germany.

In 1960 he got Leon Schiller award, granted to young theatrical directors. In 1966 he was a laureate of Tadeusz Boy-Żeleński Award for a staging of The Undivine Comedy in Stary Theatre and for A Dangerous Game in Teatr Telewizji teleplay, and West German Theatre Critics Award in 1964 for the world premiere of Peter Weiss's Marat/Sade at the Schiller Theater in Berlin, and Vladimir Mayakovsky's The Bedbug.

Among several opera stagings, Swinarski directed the world premiere of Krzysztof Penderecki's opera The Devils of Loudun in 1969 at the Hamburg State Opera.

In 1965 he started his long-time co-operation with Stary Theatre in Kraków, where some of his most famous works were produced. Those included his most famous work, novel and innovative staging of Dziady (Forefathers Eve) by Adam Mickiewicz, premiering 18 February 1973. On 30 May 1974 premiered his staging of Wyzwolenie (Liberation) by Stanisław Wyspiański, his last work for Stary Theatre. 1975 Swinarski began preparations to direct Hamlet, interrupted by his sudden death.

=== Death ===
On 19 August 1975 Swinarski died in ČSA Flight 540 accident of Ilyushin Il-62 that crashed during attempted landing near Damascus. Swinarski was invited by empress of Iran Farah Pahlavi to take part in Shiraz Arts Festival. There were plans for Swinarski to show his Dziady during next years festival. Swinarski was buried in Powązki Military Cemetery (section A37-4-4).

After his death, Teatr magazine established yearly Konrad Swinarski Award, awarded to theatrical directors for best work of the season. The laureates include Henryk Tomaszewski, Jerzy Jarocki, Maciej Prus, Jerzy Grzegorzewski, Janusz Wiśniewski.

=== Private life ===
In 1955 Swinarski married Barbara Witek. His homosexuality was a well-known fact in artistic circles, but it wasn't publicly mentioned (or in any biographical work) until 2003.

== Awards and honours ==
- 1969 – Second Degree Award of the Minister of Culture and Art for creative research in the field of theatre staging;
- 1973 – City of Kraków Award
- 1974 – First Degree State Award for outstanding achievements in the field of theatre directing
- 1974 – "Drożdże" (Yeast), award of Polityka
- 1974 – Knights Cross Order of Polonia Restituta
- Golden Cross of Merit
