= Dekalog: Ten =

1989 film from cycle directed by Krzysztof Kieślowski

- Directed by: Krzysztof Kieślowski
- Written by: Krzysztof Kieślowski; Krzysztof Piesiewicz
- Produced by: Ryszard Chutkovski
- Starring: Zbigniew Zamachowski; Jerzy Stuhr
- Cinematography: Jacek Bławut
- Edited by: Ewa Smal
- Music by: Zbigniew Preisner
- Distributed by: Polish Television
- Release date: June 24, 1989
- Running time: 55 minutes
- Country: Poland
- Language: Polish
- Budget: $10,000

Dekalog: Ten (Polish: Dekalog, dziesięć) is the tenth part of Dekalog, the drama series of films directed by Polish director Krzysztof Kieślowski for television, connected to the tenth imperative of the Ten Commandments: "Thou shalt not covet." In contrast to the bleak tone of the other episodes in the series, Dekalog X is a black comedy.

Two brothers (Jerzy Stuhr and Zbigniew Zamachowski) inherit a valuable stamp collection from their deceased father and soon become consumed and obsessed with their windfall. The brothers find themselves entangled in a series of misadventures as they attempt to understand, protect and expand their newfound fortune.

Dekalog: Ten premiered earlier than the other parts of the series, on Polish Television on June 24, 1989. The series was exhibited in its entirety at the 46th Venice International Film Festival in September 1989, in the Special Events section.

== Plot ==
The story begins at a concert of punk group City Death. There is a crowd of young people listening to the loud music and the group frontman/singer, Artur (Zbigniew Zamachowski). A man making his way through the crowd, Jerzy (Jerzy Stuhr), waves urgently to Artur, who is subsequently revealed as Jerzy's younger brother. Jerzy informs Artur that their father Czesław "Root" Janicki has died. The brothers, whose relationship with their father was distant and strained, handle the funeral proceedings with ambivalence.

Attending to the disbursement of his possessions, the brothers arrive at their father's flat, which, although dirty and austere, is steel-doored, multi-locked and heavily alarmed. They find out that there is a large collection of stamps inside the flat. They are also approached by a conspicuous neighbor who says that their father owed him a lot of money. The man suspiciously offers to take "something from the flat" to even the debt, but Jerzy cautiously dismisses him and promises to pay him later.

Neither brother has any knowledge of stamp collecting or the items in their father's collection. They decide to attend a local stamp fair to get an appraisal. At his brother's suggestion, Jerzy unthinkingly takes a series of Weimar Republic Flugpost Polarfahrt 1931 Zeppelin stamps to give to his son. Artur goes to a stamp collectors' show and there meets the president of the association who recognizes the son of "Root" Janicki; he meets both brothers at their father's apartment and tells them that the entire collection is worth a staggering amount of money. Jerzy soon finds out that his son traded the Zeppelin stamps for hundreds of worthless stamps. He tracks the stamps down to a local stamp store owner who, despite acquiring the stamps through an unfair trade, now owns them legally and rebuffs Jerzy's recuperation attempts.

Artur and Jerzy gradually become more interested in their father's expansive stamp collection, and each man finds himself spending more and more time at the flat. As they explore and read about the stamps in the collection, the brothers slowly become paranoid and decide to outfit the apartment with increased security and a guard dog. Meanwhile, Artur comes up with a scheme to force the store owner to return the Zeppelin stamps. After he successfully retrieves the series, the store owner recognizes the two men as the sons of Root and tells them about the Austrian rose Mercury, an incomplete series of which they own two of the three. The brothers, having learned that the complete series is invaluable and one-of-a-kind, become fixated on acquiring the missing stamp. The shop owner, under mysterious auspices, offers them a proposition: he reveals that he himself is the owner of the missing stamp, and he will be willing to trade it only if Jerzy donates his kidney to the store owner's ailing daughter.

After much deliberation, Artur and Jerzy's newfound obsession with their father's collection pushes Jerzy to agree to the deal. Artur visits the hospital during his brother's operation and decides to wait at the hospital for the duration of the procedure. When Jerzy is released, an emotional Artur tells his brother that the stamp collection was robbed while he was in the hospital. All that remains is the single Red Mercury stamp attained in the trade. In the frustrated fallout, the brothers report the crime to the police and decide to spend time apart. With their paranoia growing, they independently report each other to the police. Despite these initial accusations, the brothers eventually observe the shop owner and the suspicious neighbor from the beginning of the film convening with the con artist who scammed Jerzy's son out of the Zeppelin stamps. Although it is not explicitly revealed, the scene suggests that these men were all accomplices in the stamp heist. The brothers reunite at their father's flat and discover to their amusement that they have both recently purchased exactly the same series of stamps from the post office. In the face of their blindness toward the true criminals, the realization that covetousness drove a wedge in their relationship, and the absurdity of their loss, the brothers are reconciled in laughter.

== Cast ==
- Zbigniew Zamachowski - Artur
- Jerzy Stuhr - Jerzy
- Henryk Bista - shopkeeper
- Olaf Lubaszenko - Tomek
- Maciej Stuhr - Piotrek
- Róże Europy - City Death

Actors from other episodes playing different roles:

- Anna Gornostaj
- Cezary Harasimowicz
- Daniel Kozakiewicz
- Henryk Majcherek,
- Elzbieta Panas
- Jerzy Turek
- Grzegorz Warchol
