= Jan Frycz =

Polish actor (1954–2026)

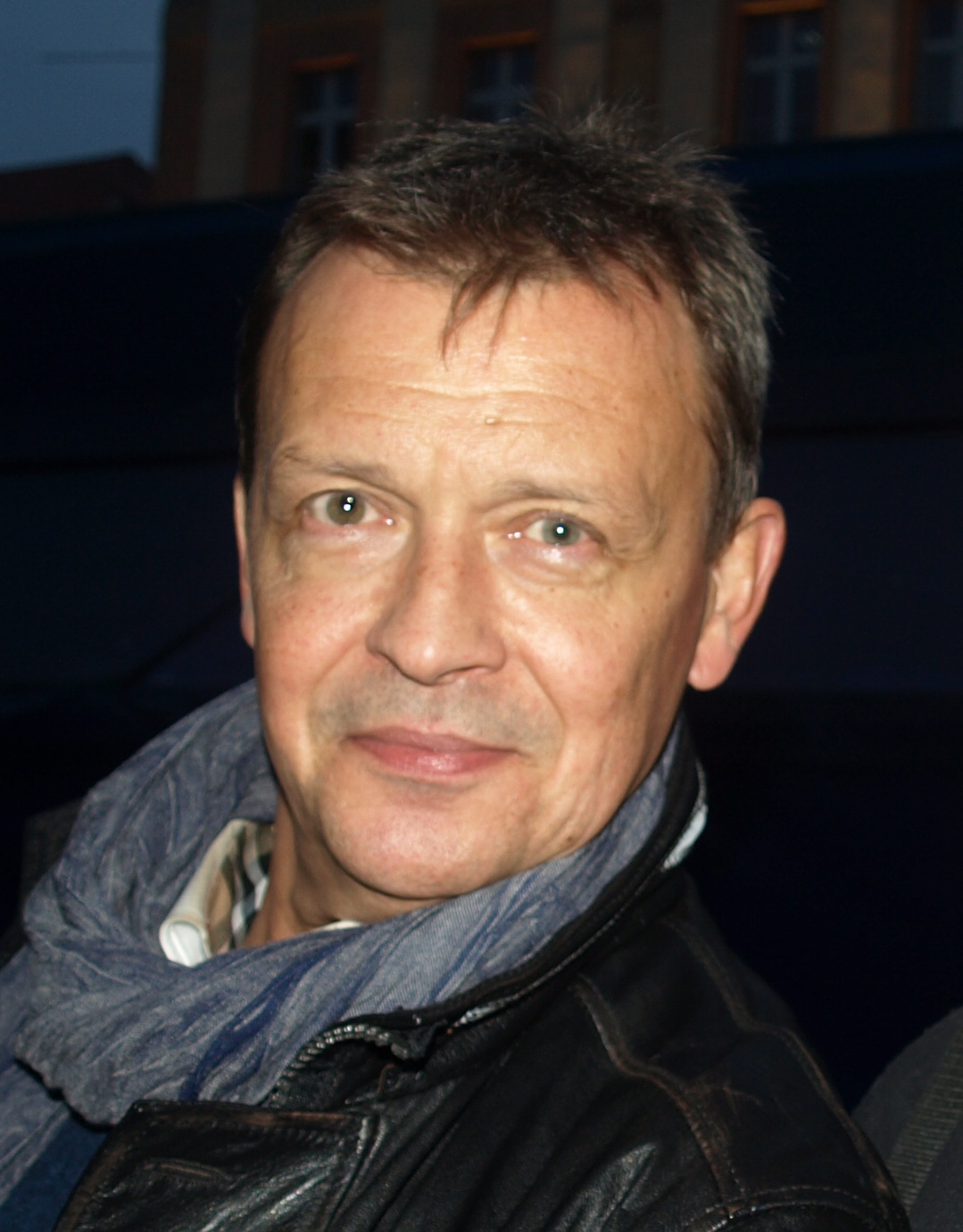
- Frycz in 2013
- Born: Jan Andrzej Frycz; 15 May 1954; Kraków, Poland
- Died: 15 August 2026 (aged 72)
- Education: National Academy of Theatre Arts in Kraków
- Occupation: Actor
- Years active: 1976–2026
- Spouse: Małgorzata Frycz
- Children: 6

Jan Andrzej Frycz (Polish: [jan frɨt͡ʂ]; 15 May 1954 – 15 August 2026) was a Polish film, television and stage actor. He was nominated for seven Polish Film Awards, winning three times for Best Supporting Actor in the films Pornografia (2003), The Welts (2004) and 25 Years of Innocence (2021).

== Life and career ==
Frycz's father was a mining engineer and disliked his interest in acting; he argued that a boy should have a more stable job. Despite his father's wishes, Frycz pursued acting and graduated from the AST National Academy of Theatre Arts in Kraków in 1978. He made his theatre debut in the same year in the Juliusz Słowacki Theatre where he continued performing in the years 1978–82 and 1984–89.

He spent two years in 1982–84 working in Warsaw at the National Theatre and the Polish Theatre, before returning to Kraków where he continued working at the Juliusz Słowacki Theatre, and from 1989 to 2006 at the National Stary Theatre.

Frycz made his screen debut in Norwegian film Dagny in 1976. In the second half of the 1970s and 1980s, he focused mainly on his theatre work, playing only a few, mostly episodic roles.

From 2006, he was an actor of the National Theatre in Warsaw.

Frycz was married three times and had a daughter from the first marriage and four children from the second marriage. His daughters Gabriela and Olga are actresses. He died on 15 August 2026, at the age of 72.

== Awards ==
- 2005 – Silver Medal for Merit to Culture – Gloria Artis
- 2005 – Order of Polonia Restituta
- 2015 – Silver Medal for Merit to Culture – Gloria Artis

== Selected filmography ==
Film
Year	Title	Role	Notes
1988	On the Silver Globe	Tomasz II	Credited as Andrzej Frycz
1990	Farewell to Autumn	Atanazy Bazakbal	
2003	Pornografia	Siemian	
2010	Little Rose	Wasiak	
2004	The Welts	Andrzej Winkler	
2005	The Collector	Chudy	
2006	We're All Christs		
2011	80 Million	Baginski	
2007	Hope	Gustaw	
2007	Twists of Fate		
2020	25 Years of Innocence	'Stary'	
