= Twists of Fate =

Korowód
- Directed by: Jerzy Stuhr
- Written by: Jerzy Stuhr
- Produced by: Juliusz Machulski
- Starring: Kamil Mackowiak; Karolina Gorczyca; Katarzyna Maciag
- Cinematography: Bartek Prokopowicz
- Edited by: Elzbieta Kurkowska
- Music by: Pawel Szymanski
- Release date: 9 November 2007
- Running time: 112 minutes
- Country: Poland
- Language: Polish

Korowód, or Twists of Fate, is a 2007 Polish drama film directed by Jerzy Stuhr. It stars Kamil Mackowiak, Karolina Gorczyca and Katarzyna Maciag. Supporting roles are played by Jan Frycz, Aleksandra Konieczna, Maciej Stuhr and Matylda Baczynska.

== Plot ==
The film revolves around Bartek Wilkosz, a student keen to exploit the academic system through plagiarism and anxious to grab a buck (or zloty) however he can. After seeing a suspicious man on a train, Bartek follows him across Poland. Once the man's identity is discovered, the lives of several people are altered.
