= Grzegorz Królikiewicz =

Polish film director

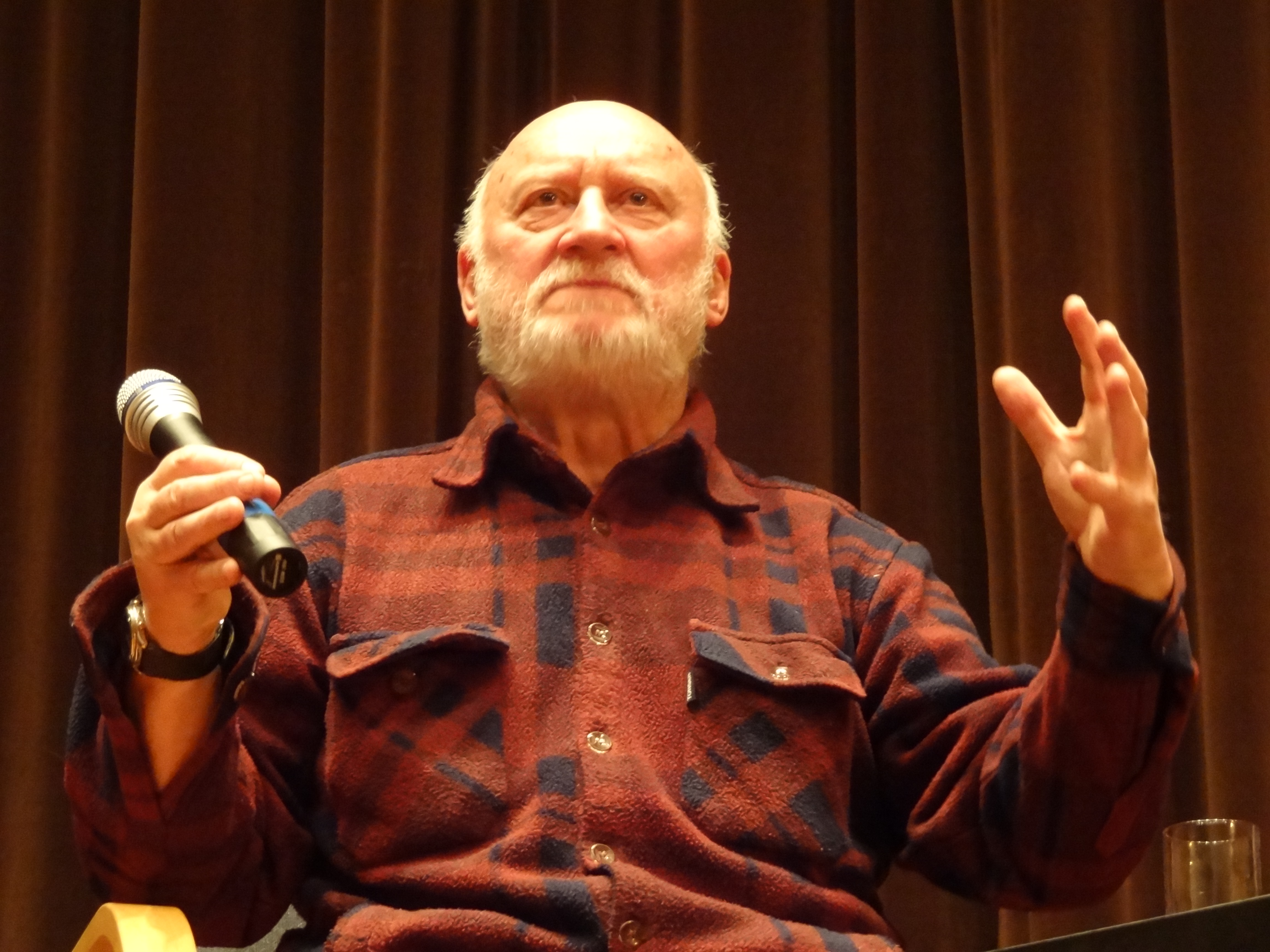
- Królikiewicz in 2013
- Born: June 5, 1939; Aleksandrów Kujawski, Second Polish Republic
- Died: September 21, 2017 (aged 78); Łódź, Poland
- Education: University of Łódź; National Film School in Łódź
- Occupations: Film director, screenwriter, pedagogue

Grzegorz Królikiewicz (5 June 1939 – 21 September 2017) was a Polish film director, screenwriter, and pedagogue.

== Life and career ==
In 1962, he graduated from the Faculty of Law at the University of Łódź. In 1967, he began his studies at the National Film School in Łódź from which he graduated in 1970. He directed a number of documentary films, TV shows as well as feature films. In 1976–78, he directed the television Editorial Office of Facts. Between 1981–1983, he served as the artistic director of the Aneks Film Studio (Zespół Filmowy Aneks). In the years 2003–2005, he worked as director of the New Theatre in Łódź. Since 1981, he also worked as an academic teacher at the Faculty of Film and Television Directing at the National Film School in Łódź. In 1993, he obtained the title of professor. He was a member of the Polish Film Academy.

== Death ==
He died on 21 September 2017 in Łódź and was buried at the Old Cemetery in Łódź.

== Selected awards ==
In 1993, he was awarded the Golden Lions Award (Złote Lwy) at the 18th Gdynia Film Festival for his film Przypadek Pekosińskiego ("Pekosiński's Case"). In 1994, he also received the Special Award at the Karlovy Vary International Film Festival for this film. In 2011, he became the recipient of the Knight's Cross of the Order of Polonia Restituta and in 2013, he was awarded the Gold Medal for Merit to Culture – Gloria Artis. In 2016, he was awarded the Krzysztof Krauze Prize for his film Sąsiady ("The Neighbours").

== Filmography ==
- Na wylot (1972)
- Wieczne pretensje (1974)
- Tańczący jastrząb (1977)
- Klejnot wolnego sumienia (1981)
- Fort 13 (1984)
- Zabicie ciotki (1984)
- Przypadek Pekosińskiego (1993)
- Drzewa (1995)
- Sąsiady (2014)

== See also ==
- Polish cinema
- List of Poles
