= Hope (2007 film) =

2007 film

- Polish theatrical release poster
- Directed by: Stanisław Mucha
- Written by: Krzysztof Piesiewicz
- Produced by: Peter Ingemann
- Starring: Rafał Fudalej; Wojciech Pszoniak
- Cinematography: Krzysztof Ptak
- Edited by: Jacek Tarasiuk
- Music by: Max Richter
- Production company: Pandora Filmproduktion
- Distributed by: Pandora Filmproduktion
- Release dates: 24 June 2007 (Moscow); 25 July 2007 (Poland); 17 January 2008 (Germany)
- Running time: 101 minutes
- Countries: Germany; Poland
- Language: Polish
- Box office: $ 22,617

Hope (Polish: Nadzieja; German: Hoffnung) is a 2007 German-Polish drama film directed by Stanisław Mucha. It was entered into the 29th Moscow International Film Festival.

== Cast ==
- Rafał Fudalej as Franciszek Ratay
- Kamilla Baar as Klara
- Wojciech Pszoniak as Benedykt Weber
- Zbigniew Zapasiewicz as Franciszek's Father
- Zbigniew Zamachowski as Sopel
- Grzegorz Artman as Michal Ratay
- Jerzy Trela as Airclub Worker
- Jan Frycz as Gustaw
- Lilith Mucha as Melania
- Dominika Ostalowska as Matka
