= Jerzy Jarocki =

Polish theatre director (1929–2012)

- Born: 11 May 1929; Warsaw, Poland
- Died: 10 October 2012 (aged 83); Warsaw, Poland
- Citizenship: Polish
- Occupations: Theatre director, playwright, educator, translator

Jerzy Jarocki (11 May 1929 – 10 October 2012) was a Polish theatre director, translator, playwright and academic. he was a member of the Polish Academy of Learning.

== Biography ==
He graduated in acting from the Ludwik Solski Academy for the Dramatic Arts and later in directing from the Russian Academy of Theatre Arts. He debuted in 1957, directing an adaptation of the play Bal manekinów by Bruno Jasieński at Silesian Theatre.

Since 1961 he worked as a regular director for National Stary Theatre in Kraków, where on 21 July 1961, he first presented an adaptation of Françoise Sagan's Château en Suède. Jarocki also directed plays for Polish Theatre in Wrocław and Dramatic Theatre of the Capital City of Warsaw. He mostly looked for an inspiration in contemporary literature, among his favourite authors were Eugene O'Neill, Arthur Miller, Sławomir Mrożek, Friedrich Dürrenmatt, Stanisław Ignacy Witkiewicz, Witold Gombrowicz, Tadeusz Różewicz, Anton Chekhov and Vladimir Mayakovsky.

Jarocki was a lecturer at Ludwik Solski Academy for the Dramatic Arts since 1966. Since 1991 he owned the title of academic professor. Since 1994 he was also a member of the Polish Academy of Learning.

In 1967 he received a Schiller Award for achievements in theatre directing, especially for directing Polish contemporary plays in years 1965–67. In 1968 Jarocki was decorated with Gold Cross of Merit. In 1971 he was awarded by the Minister of Culture of Poland and in 1974 he received Knight's Cross of the Polonia Restituta. In 1977 he received Konrad Swinarski Award for directing King Lear at Dramatic Theatre of Warsaw. In 1984 Jarocki received Witkacy Prize - Critics' Circle Award.

Jarocki was decorated with Officier's Cross of the Polonia Restituta in 1987 and with Gold Medal for Merit to Culture – Gloria Artis in 2007. In 2000 Jagiellonian University distinguished him with an honoris causa degree.
