= Persona non grata (2005 film) =

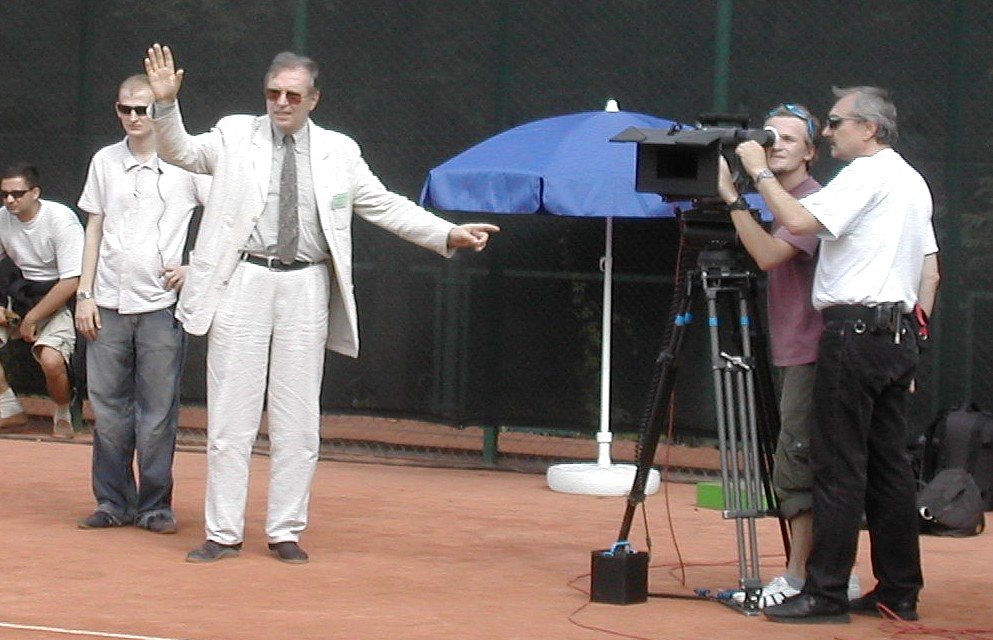
- Directed by: Krzysztof Zanussi
- Starring: Zbigniew Zapasiewicz; Nikita Mikhalkov
- Cinematography: Edward Kłosiński
- Music by: Wojciech Kilar
- Release date: 4 September 2005 (VFF)
- Running time: 1h 50min
- Country: Poland
- Language: Polish

Persona non grata is a 2005 Polish drama film directed by Krzysztof Zanussi.

== Cast ==
- Zbigniew Zapasiewicz - Wiktor
- Nikita Mikhalkov - Oleg
- Jerzy Stuhr - Polish attaché Radca
- Remo Girone - Italian Consul
- Daniel Olbrychski - Polish vice foreign minister
- Andrzej Chyra - New Consul
- Ryszard Barycz
- Maria Bekker - Oksana
- Jacek Borcuch
- Tadeusz Bradecki
- Halina Golanko - Helena Leszczynska
