= Zbigniew Zamachowski =

Polish actor (born 1961)

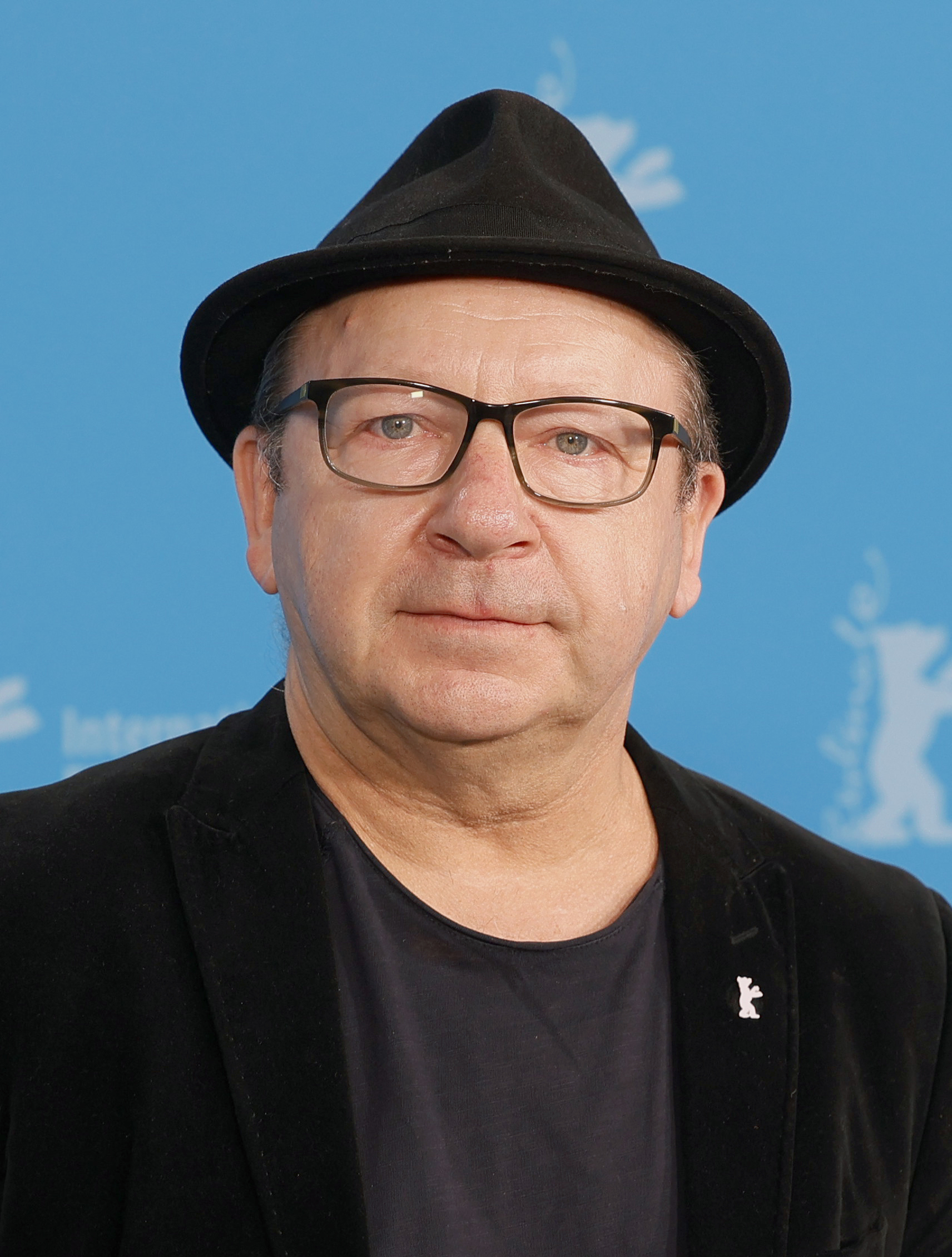
- Zbigniew Zamachowski in 2024
- Born: 17 July 1961 (age 65); Brzeziny, Polish People's Republic
- Education: National Film School in Łódź
- Occupation: Actor
- Years active: 1981–present
- Spouse(s): Anna Komornicka (divorced); Aleksandra Justa (divorced March 2012); Monika Zamachowska (2014-2021)
- Children: Marysia, Antek, Tadeusz, Bronisława

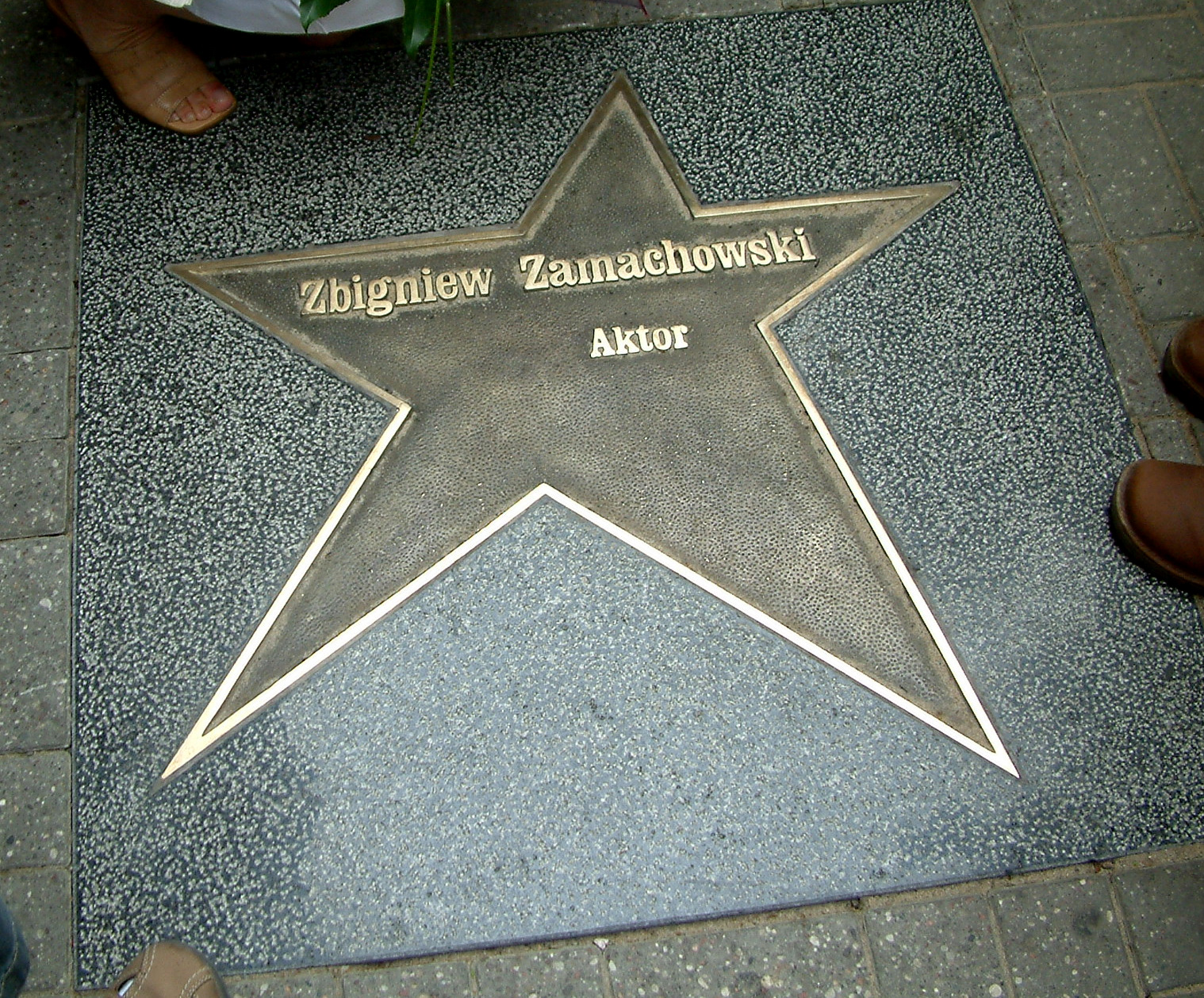
Zamachowski's star on the Łódź Walk of Fame

Zbigniew Zamachowski (Polish pronunciation: [ˈzbiɡɲɛv zamaˈxɔfskʲi]; born 17 July 1961) is a Polish actor. He is a two-time recipient of the Polish Academy Award for Best Actor.

== Life and career ==
He was born on 17 July 1961 in Brzeziny near Łódź. Zamachowski graduated from the actor's faculty of the National Film School in Łódź. He began his acting career in 1981 and in 1989 had a co-starring role in Part Ten (Thou Shalt Not Covet Thy Neighbor's Goods) of director Krzysztof Kieślowski's film series, Dekalog. Four years later, Kieślowski cast him as the lead character, "Karol Karol", in Three Colors: White, the second of his acclaimed Three Colors trilogy. He is a two-time winner of Polish Film Awards for his roles in Robert Gliński's film Hi, Tereska (2001) and Andrzej Jakimowski's film drama Zmróż oczy (2004). His other notable roles are featured in Kazimierz Kutz's film Colonel Kwiatkowski (1996), Jerzy Hoffman's historical film With Fire and Sword (1999) and Andrzej Wajda's biopic Walesa: Man of Hope (2013).

Between 1985 and 1997, he performed at The Studio Theater, and since 1997 he has been an actor at the National Theater in Warsaw.

== Filmography ==
- Wielka majówka (1981) a.k.a. The Big Picnic
- Matka Królów (1983) a.k.a. Mother of Kings
- Ucieczka (1986) a.k.a. Escape, The
- Pierscien i róza (1987) a.k.a. The Ring and the Rose as Prince Bulbo
- Prywatne sledztwo (1987) a.k.a. Private Investigation as Truck passenger
- Possédés, Les (1988) a.k.a. The Possessed as Liamchine
- Zabij mnie, glino (1989) a.k.a. Kill Me, Cop as Seweryn
- Sztuka kochania (1989) a.k.a. Art of Loving as Ziobro
- Dekalog, dziesiec (1989) (TV) a.k.a. Thou Shalt Not Covet Thy Neighbor's Goods as Artur
- Korczak (1990) as Ichak Szulc
- Ucieczka z kina 'Wolnosc' (1991) a.k.a. Escape From the 'Liberty' Cinema as Pomocnik cenzora
- Seszele (1991) a.k.a. Seychelles as Stefek
- Ferdydurke (1991) a.k.a. Tom
- Tak, tak (1992) a.k.a. Yes, Yes
- Naprawde krótki film o milosci, zabijaniu i jeszcze jednym przykazaniu (1992) a.k.a. Really short movie about love, killing and one more commandment.
- Sauna (1992) (TV) as Jussi
- Straszny sen dzidziusia Górkiewicza (1993) a.k.a. The Terrible Dream of Babyface Gorkiewicz
- Trois couleurs: Blanc (1993) a.k.a. Three Colours: White as Karol Karol
- Zawrócony (1994) (TV) a.k.a. Reverted as Tomek Siwek
- Clandestin, Le (1994) (TV) as Yatsek
- Pulkownik Kwiatkowski (1995) a.k.a. Colonel Kwiatkowski as Dudek
- Pestka a.k.a. The Pip (1996)
- Slawa i chwala (1997) (TV) a.k.a. Fame and Glory as Franciszek Golabek
- Darmozjad polski (1997) a.k.a. Polish Freeloader, The as Swede
- Odwiedz mnie we snie (1997) a.k.a. Visit Me in My Dream
- Szczęśliwego Nowego Jorku (1997) a.k.a. Happy New York as Potejto
- Pulapka (1997) a.k.a. Trap, The
- Demony wojny wedlug Goi (1998) a.k.a. Demons of War as Cpl. 'Houdini' Moraczewski
- Kochaj i rób co chcesz (1998) a.k.a. Love, and Do Whatever You Want as Lech Ryszka
- 23 (1998) as Sergej
- Ogniem i mieczem (1999) a.k.a. With Fire and Sword as Michal Wolodyjowski
- Pierwszy milion (2000) as Policeman a.k.a. First million
- Prymas - trzy lata z tysiaca (2000) a.k.a. The Primate as Priest Stanislaw Skorodecki
- Når nettene blir lange (2000) a.k.a. Cabin Fever as Brother-in-law
- Proof of Life (2000) as Terry's Driver
- Weiser (2001) as Kolota
- Lightmaker (2001) as Rumo Ranieri
- Sto minut wakacji (2001) (TV) a.k.a. One houndred minutes of holydays
- Cześć Tereska (2001) a.k.a. Hi, Tereska as Edek
- Stacja (2001) a.k.a. Station as Dymecki, owner of petrol station
- Wiedzmin (2001) a.k.a. The Witcher/The Hexer as Jaskier/Dandelion
- Wiedzmin (2002) a.k.a. The Witcher/The Hexer as Jaskier/Dandelion
- The Pianist (2002) as Customer with Coins
- Zmruz oczy (2002) a.k.a. Squint Your Eyes as Jasiek
- Distant Lights (2003) original title Lichter as Antoni. Director: Hans-Christian Schmid
- La Petite prairie aux bouleaux (2003) a.k.a. The Birch-Tree Meadow as Gutek
- Cialo (2003) a.k.a. Corpus as Dizel
- Żurek (2003) as Matuszek
- Zróbmy sobie wnuka (2003) a.k.a. Let's make ourselves a grandson as Gustaw Mytnik
- Wrózby kumaka (2005) (post-production) a.k.a. The Call of the Toad
- Skazany na bluesa (2005) a.k.a. Destined for Blues as Mr. Henio
- Diabel (2005) a.k.a. Devil, The as Frank's friend
- Czas Surferów (2005) a.k.a. Surfer's time as Klama
- Hope (2007)
- Aftermath (2012)
- Walesa. Man of Hope (2013) as Nawislak
- Run Boy Run (2013) as Hersch Fridman
- Jack Strong (film) (2014)
- True Crimes (2016) as Lukasz
- Alzur's Legacy (2020) as Jaskier/Dandelion
- Sweat (2020) as Fryderyk
- Sexify (2021) as dean Krzysztof Maślak
- Treasure (2024) as Stefan
- Lead Children (2026) as Zdzisław Grudzień
