= Jerzy Stuhr =

Polish actor (1947–2024)

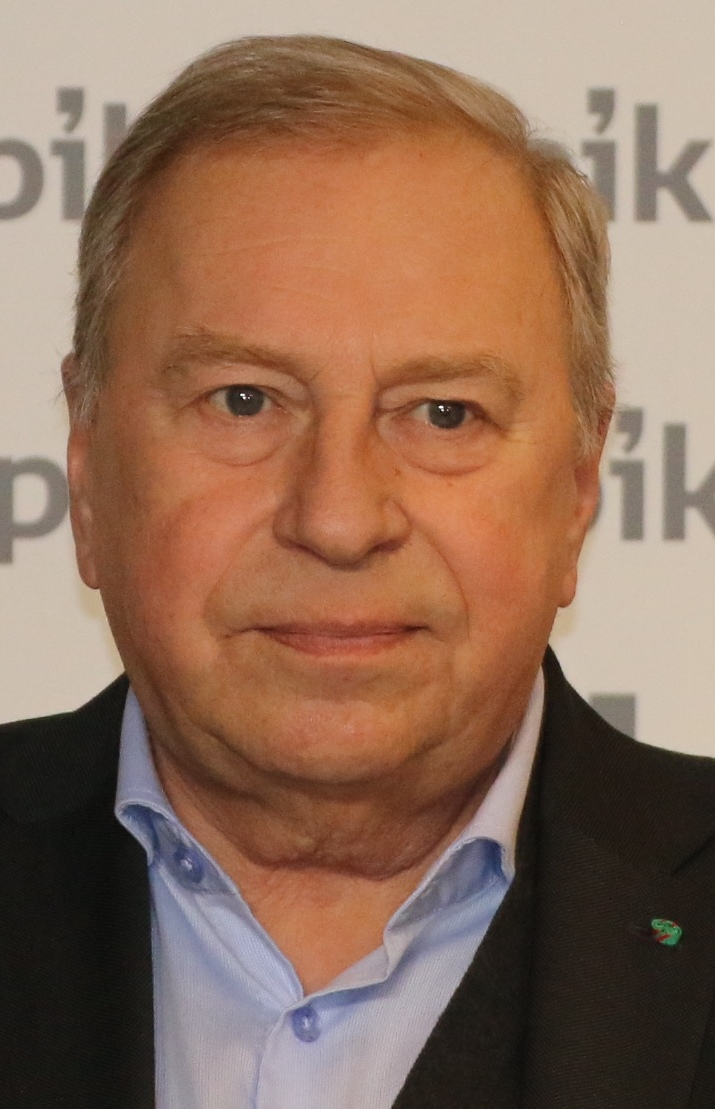
- Stuhr in 2018
- Born: Jerzy Oskar Stuhr; 18 April 1947; Kraków, Poland
- Died: 9 July 2024 (aged 77); Kraków, Poland
- Education: Jagiellonian University; National Academy of Theatre Arts in Kraków
- Occupations: Actor, Director
- Years active: 1971–2024
- Spouse: Barbara Kóska (m. 1971)
- Children: 2 including Maciej

Jerzy Oskar Stuhr (Polish: [ˈjɛʐɨ ˈɔskar ˈʂtur]; 18 April 1947 – 9 July 2024) was a Polish film and theatre actor. Considered one of the most popular, influential and versatile Polish actors and an icon of Polish cinema, he also worked as a screenwriter, film director, voice actor and drama professor. He served as the rector of the Ludwik Solski Academy for the Dramatic Arts in Kraków for two terms: from 1990 to 1996 and again from 2002 to 2008.

Throughout his long and prolific professional career spanning over five decades, he appeared in 65 films including Camera Buff (1979), Sexmission (1984), A Year of the Quiet Sun (1984), Dekalog: Ten (1989), Three Colours: White (1994), Kiler (1997), Love Stories (1997) and The Big Animal (2000).

He received numerous awards and honours including the Order of Merit of the Italian Republic (2000), Gloria Artis Medal for Merit to Culture (2005), Polish Academy Award for Best Supporting Actor for his role in Persona non grata (2006), Złota Kaczka Award (2008), Commander's Cross with Star of the Order of Polonia Restituta (2011), and Polish Academy Life Achievement Award (2018).

== Life and career ==
=== Early life and education ===
Stuhr was born in 1947 in Kraków to father Tadeusz Stuhr, a prosecutor, and mother Maria (née Chorąży) who worked as an accountant. His ancestors, Austrians Leopold Stuhr and Anna Thill, migrated within Austria-Hungary from Mistelbach to Kraków shortly after their wedding in 1879.

He graduated from the Stefan Żeromski High School No. 3 in Bielsko-Biała. Having obtained a degree in Polish literature from the Jagiellonian University in 1970, Stuhr spent the next two years studying acting at the Academy for the Dramatic Arts in Kraków (Państwowa Wyższa Szkoła Teatralna often shortened to PWST), where he became a professor.

=== Professional career ===
From the early 1970s, he appeared in Polish theatre and worked in film productions, making his debut with the role of Beelzebub in Adam Mickiewicz's Dziady directed by Konrad Swinarski.

Having met film director Krzysztof Kieślowski in the mid-1970s, he continued to work with him until Kieślowski's death in 1996. To an international audience, Stuhr may be best known for his minor role as thick-witted hairdresser Jurek in Kieślowski's Three Colors: White, in which he starred alongside Julie Delpy, Janusz Gajos, and Zbigniew Zamachowski. In Poland and nearby countries, he was probably best known for the part of Max in Juliusz Machulski's 1984 dystopian cult comedy Seksmisja (one of the most popular Polish movies), and – to a younger audience – for lending his voice to the talking donkey in the dubbed Polish version of the Shrek trilogy.

Other important films include Kieślowski's The Scar (Blizna, 1976), Camera Buff (Amator, 1979) and Part 10 of The Decalogue series (1988), Machulski's Kingsize (1987), Kiler (1997) and Kiler 2 (1999), and Zanussi's Life for Life (1988). Stuhr also worked with Polish directors Agnieszka Holland, Andrzej Wajda and Krzysztof Zanussi.

In 1985, Stuhr made his own directorial debut staging the Polish version of Patrick Süskind's play The Double Bass, in which he also played the (only) role. In spite of the production's success, it was not until 1995 that Stuhr began directing films as well, with List of Adulteresses (Spis cudzołożnic) based on a novel by Jerzy Pilch. Critics favourably compared his next effort Love Stories (Historie miłosne, 1997) to Kieślowski's work. The film consists of four unconnected episodes with Stuhr playing the lead role in each. Further movies directed by Stuhr are Big Animal (Duże zwierzę, 2000 – based on a Kieślowski screenplay), and Tomorrow's Weather (Pogoda na jutro, 2003). For these two, Stuhr employed the Polish alternative rock band Myslovitz who composed the title tracks and also had walk-on roles in the latter. In an interview with The Krakow Post Stuhr admitted that Italian cinéaste Nanni Moretti influenced his approach to filmmaking.

From 1990 to 1997, and again from 2002, Stuhr held the position of rector at the Kraków National Drama School, where he had learned his craft two decades before. He formally obtained the title of professor in Dramatic Arts in 1994.

In 2004 he was a member of the jury at the 26th Moscow International Film Festival. In 2007, he received an honorary degree from the University of Silesia in Katowice.

He was head of the jury of the 2nd Odesa International Film Festival which took place in Odesa from 15 to 23 July 2011.

He worked with RMF FM and also wrote books such as Escape forward! (Ucieczka do przodu !) and The Stuhrs: Family Stories (Stuhrowie: Historie Rodzinne).

=== Death ===
Stuhr died in Kraków on 9 July 2024, at the age of 77. The funeral mass took place on 17 July 2024 at the Saints Peter and Paul Church in Kraków and was celebrated by Cardinal Grzegorz Ryś. He was buried at the Rakowicki Cemetery.

== Personal life ==
In 1971, Stuhr married violinist Barbara (née Kóska). He had two children. His son Maciej (born 1975) is an actor in his own right, who has played alongside his father in Kieślowski's Decalogue X (1988), Tomorrow's Weather (2003), and Love Stories (1997). His daughter, Marianna (born 1982) is an artist and painter.

He was involved in supporting various charity organizations including the Józef Tischner Children's Hospice in Kraków (of which he was the chairman of the board of supervisors) and the Jan Kaczkowski Foundation helping people suffering from cancer.

He was an avid football fan and was known as a supporter of Polonia Bytom and Wisła Kraków. In 2012, he became an ambassador of the UEFA Euro 2012 hosted by Poland and Ukraine.

In Autumn 2011 Stuhr suffered what he thought was a severe throat infection, but eventually he was diagnosed with laryngeal cancer. He spent most of the following eight months in hospitals in Gliwice, Kraków and Zakopane, undergoing treatment including surgeries, radiotherapy, and chemotherapy. His daughter, herself a cancer survivor, advised him to write a diary to keep himself mentally busy during that difficult time. In 2012 it was published by Wydawnictwo Literackie publishing house under the title Tak sobie myślę... (which roughly translates as So I am thinking...). His illness was widely covered by Polish media, and he received feedback from cancer patients around the country for whom his openness was comforting. Eventually he described his cancer as "the most important role of my life". As of April 2013, his cancer was in remission and he resumed both stage and voice acting.

In 2022, he caused a road collision in Kraków while driving under the influence of alcohol. In 2023, the Appeals Court in Kraków upheld the previous verdict which pronounced him guilty of causing the accident and drunk driving. He had his driving license confiscated and was banned from driving motor vehicles for a period of three years.

== Awards and recognition ==
11 November 1997, by decision of President Aleksander Kwaśniewski, in recognition of his prominent addition to Polish national culture Jerzy Stuhr was awarded the Commander's Cross of the Order of Polonia Restituta.

On 12 November 2008, he received Złota Kaczka (Golden Duck) being chosen the "Best Comedy Actor of the Century".

Stuhr was appointed to the European Film Award for his fourfold role in Love stories. He was a laureate of the Venice Film Festival. He also received numerous other Polish and international awards in recognition of his work, including:

- Polish Academy Life Achievement Award (2018)
- Order of the Smile (2014)
- Special Award of the Gdynia Film Festival for his film Obywatel (2014)
- Honoris Gratia Award (2012)
- Commander's Cross with Star of the Order of Polonia Restituta (2011)
- Honorary degree of the University of Silesia in Katowice (2007)
- Best Script Award at the Gdynia Film Festival to the film Korowód (2007)
- Golden Medal for Merit to Culture – Gloria Artis (2005)
- Order of Merit of the Italian Republic (2000)
- Laurel of Kraków of the 21st century (2006)
- Paszport Polityki (1997)
- Golden Lions Award at the Gdynia Film Festival for his role in the film Love stories (1997)
- Special Award of the Gdynia Film Festival for his role in the film Spis cudzołożnic ("List of Adulteresses") (1994)
- Golden Cross of Merit (1989)
- Witkacy Prize - Critics' Circle Award (1988)

== Voice acting ==
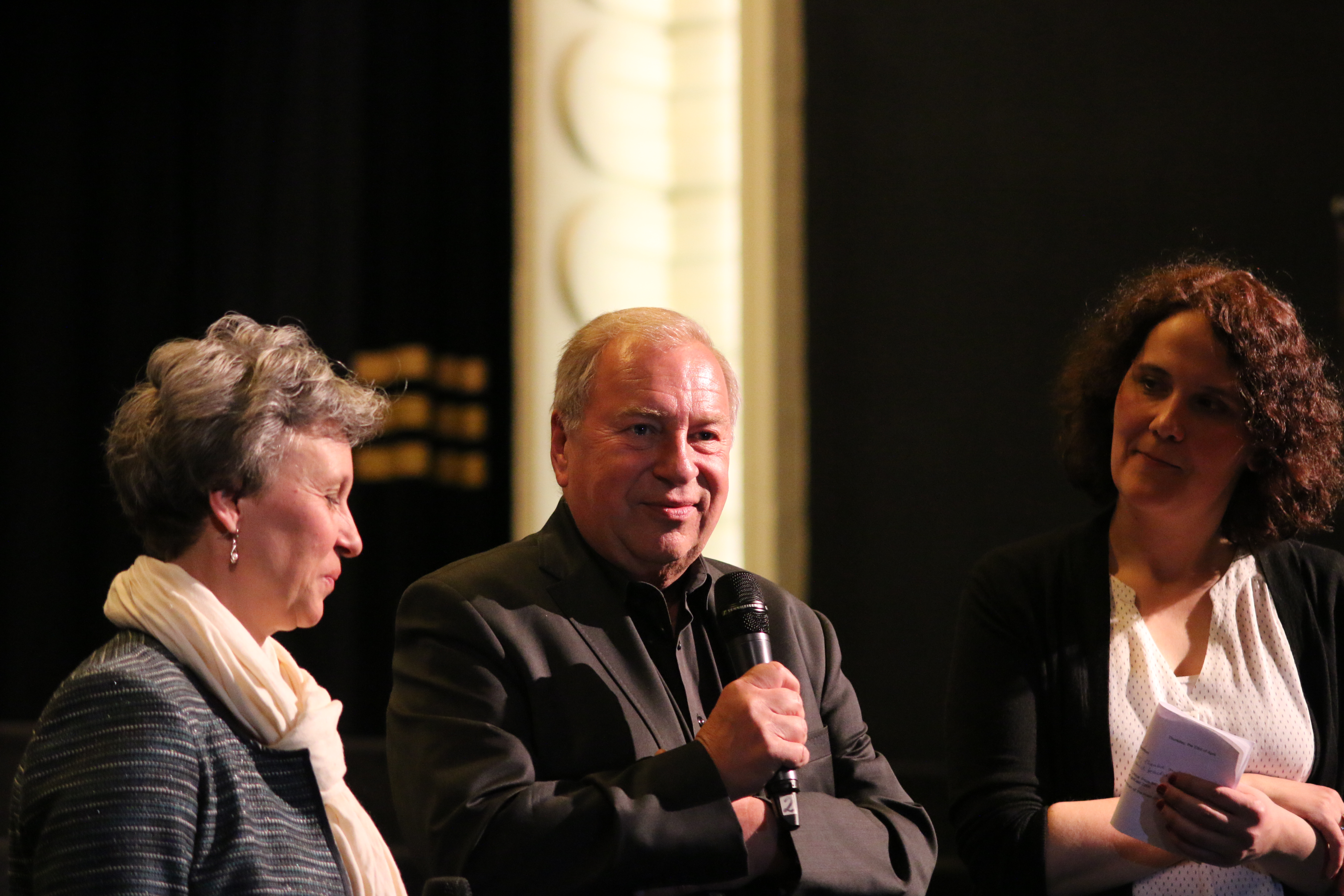
GoEast Festival in Wiesbaden, 2015

Jerzy Stuhr became very popular with younger viewers after he provided the voice for Donkey in the Polish dubbed version of Shrek (as well as in Shrek 2, Shrek the Third and in video games, based on the Shrek movies). Stuhr also provided the voice of Mushu the dragon in Disney's Mulan and Mulan 2, and for the Larry Laffer character in Larry 7 game.

== Filmography ==
=== Actor ===
Polish title	English title	Year	Role
	I Will Not Starve (Non morirò di fame)	2022	Granata
Habemus papam—Mamy papieża	We Have a Pope	2011	Marcin Rajski
Korowód	Twists of Fate	2007	The Rector
Il caimano		2006	Jerzy Sturovsky
Persona Non Grata		2005	Counselor of the Polish Embassy
Arie		2004	Israel Arie
Pogoda na jutro	Tomorrow's Weather	2003	Józef Kozioł
Show		2003	Boss
Duże zwierzę	Big Animal	2000	Zygmunt Sawicki
Vita altrui, La	The Other's Life	2000	Riccardo
Down House		2000	Gen. Ivolgin
Tydzień z życia mężczyzny	A Week in the Life of a Man	1999	Adam Borowski
Kilerów 2-óch		1999	commissioner Jerzy Ryba
Kiler		1997	commissioner Jerzy Ryba
Historie miłosne	Love Stories	1997	The teacher/The priest/Col. Matałowski/Zdzisio
Matka swojej matki	Mother of mother	1996	Roman
Spis cudzołożnic	List of Lovers	1995	Gustaw
Trzy kolory: Biały	Three Colors: White	1994	Jurek
Uprowadzenie Agaty	Kidnapping of Agata	1993	Agata's Father
Życie za Życie	Life for Life: Maximilian Kolbe	1991	Prałat
Dekalog X	Thou Shalt Not Covet Thy Neighbor's Goods	1989	Jerzy
Obywatel Piszczyk	Citizen Piszczyk	1989	Jan Piszczyk
Déjà vu		1990	Johnny Pollack
Kingsajz	King Size	1988	nadszyszkownik Kilkujadek
Pociąg do Hollywood	Train to Hollywood	1987	The Director
Bohater roku	Hero of the Year	1987	Ludwik Danielak
Luk Erosa	Cupid's Bow	1987	Stanisław Cięglewicz
Śmierc Johna L.	The Death of John L	1987	Coalminer from Bytom
Ga, Ga - Chwała bohaterom	Ga-ga: Glory to the Heroes	1986	clerk Chudy
Ucieczka	Escape	1986	Czesio
Medium		1985	Georg Netz
O-bi, O-ba – Koniec cywilizacji	O-Bi, O-Ba: The End of Civilization	1985	Soft
Rok spokojnego słońca	A Year of the Quiet Sun	1984	Adzio
Seksmisja	Sexmission	1984	Maksymilian 'Maks' Paradys
Dziady (TV)		1983	Belzebub/Master of Ceremonies/Valet
Matka Królów	Mother of Kings	1983	member of UB
From a Far Country	From a Far Country: Pope John Paul II	1981	Engineer
Wojna światów - następne stulecie	The War of the Worlds: Next Century	1981	lawyer
Przypadek	Blind Chance	1981	activist of ZSMP
Ćma	The Moth	1980	"Elegant"
Spokój (TV)	Peace	1980	Antek Gralak
Szansa	Chance	1980	Zbyszek Ejmont, history teacher
Wizja lokalna 1901	Inspection of the Crime Scene 1901	1980	councilman Wagner
Amator	Camera Buff	1979	Filip Mosz
Aktorzy prowincjonalni	Provincial Actors	1978	reviewer
Bez znieczulenia	Without Anesthesia	1978	Jerzy Porębowicz
Wodzirej	Top Dog	1978	Lutek Danielak
Blizna	The Scar	1976	Bednarz's assistant
Przyjęcie na dziesięć osób plus trzy (TV)	Guest in front of Employment Agency	1973	the guest in front of the intermediary
Trzecia część nocy	The Third Part of the Night	1971	Laboratory assistant

=== Director and screenplay writer ===
Polish title	Year	English title
Spis cudzołożnic	1995	List of Lovers
Historie miłosne	1997	Love Stories
Tydzień z życia mężczyzny	1999	A Week in the Life of a Man
Duże zwierzę	2000	Big Animal
Pogoda na jutro	2003	Tomorrow's Weather
Korowód	2007	Twists of Fate

=== Voice in Polish Dub ===
English title	Year	Role
Mulan	1998	Mushu
Leisure Suit Larry: Love for Sail!	2000	Larry Laffer
Shrek	2001	Donkey
Shrek 2	2004	Donkey
Mulan 2	2004	Mushu
Shrek the Third	2007	Donkey
Shrek the Halls	2007	Donkey
Copernicus' Star	2009	Paul Van De Volder
Shrek Forever After	2010	Donkey
Christmas Story	2010	Santa Claus
Scared Shrekless	2010	Donkey
Shrek 4-D	2010	Donkey
The Smurfs	2011	Gargamel
The Smurfs 2	2013	Gargamel
Gnome Alone	2017	Quicksilver
Loving Vincent	2017	Postman Joseph Roulin
Mowgli: Legend of the Jungle	2018	Akela
The Lion King	2019	Rafiki
