= A Week in the Life of a Man =

1999 comedy-drama film

- Directed by: Jerzy Stuhr
- Screenplay by: Jerzy Stuhr
- Starring: Jerzy Stuhr; Gosia Dobrowolska
- Cinematography: Edward Kłosiński
- Edited by: Elżbieta Kurkowska
- Music by: Wojciech Kilar
- Release date: 1999
- Language: Polish

A Week in the Life of a Man (Polish: Tydzień z życia mężczyzny) is a 1999 Polish comedy-drama film written and directed by Jerzy Stuhr. It premiered into the main competition at the 56th Venice International Film Festival.

== Cast ==
- Jerzy Stuhr as Adam Borowski
- Gosia Dobrowolska as Anna Borowska
- Danuta Szaflarska as Adam's mother
- Alex Możdżyński as Dominik
- Ewa Skibińska as Marta
- Krzysztof Stroiński as Oleś

== Release ==
The film had its world premiere at the 56th edition of the Venice Film Festival, in which it entered the main competition.

== Reception ==
Variety's critic David Stratton praised the film, noting its Krzysztof Kieślowski's influences and calling it an "intelligent and subtle" "incisive analysis of the double standards and self-delusion apparently rampant in the late '90s Poland". Rzeczpospolita's critic Barbara Hollender described the film as "deeply rooted in Polish reality, offering an in-depth analysis of the condition of the present-day intelligentsia, showing the dilemmas of people who matured under different circumstances, and today are trying to find their way around the new reality". Time Out called it "a solid, well-mounted and nicely performed drama".

The film got 7 Polish Film Award nominations, including for best film, best director, best screenplay, and best actor. It won the Jury's Special Prize and the Association of Polish Filmmakers Award at the 1999 Polish Film Festival.
