= Edward Kłosiński =

Polish cinematographer (1943–2008)

Edward Stefan Kłosiński (Polish pronunciation: [ˈɛdvart kwɔˈɕiɲskʲi]; 2 January 1943, in Warsaw – 5 January 2008, in Milanówek) was a Polish cinematographer.

== Life and work ==
Kłosiński completed his studies at the National Film School in Lodz in 1967. His screen debut came in 1972; in 1973 he worked for the first time with Krzysztof Zanussi. Andrzej Wajda hired him in 1974 for the debut of his first film, The Promised Land.

Since his work with Wajda in the 1970s Kłosiński became one of the foremost Polish cinematographers, enjoying international success. Besides that film, he also worked as lighting director for theatre productions by Wajda, Magda Umer, Andrzej Domalik, and Krystyna Janda. In Germany, he regularly worked with Dieter Wedel. He later married Janda. The last film he did before his death was 2007's Love Comes Lately.

Kłosiński died on 5 January 2008 in Milanówek of lung cancer. He is buried in the Evangelical Cemetery of the Augsburg Confession in Warsaw.

== Filmography ==
- 1997: An Air So Pure
- 1999: A Week in the Life of a Man
- 2000: Life as a Fatal Sexually Transmitted Disease
- 2000: The Farewell
- 2002: Chopin: Desire for Love
- 2002: Gebürtig
- 2002: The Supplement
- 2005: Persona Non Grata
- 2007: Love Comes Lately

== Awards ==
- 1999 Bavarian Film Award, Best Cinematography
