= Escape from Recsk =

- Directed by: Lívia Gyarmathy
- Starring: Daniel Olbrychski; Artur Żmijewski
- Release date: 13 February 1997
- Running time: 1h 35min
- Countries: Hungary; Poland; Germany
- Languages: Hungarian; Polish

Escape from Recsk (Hungarian: Szökés, Polish: Ucieczka) is a 1997 Hungarian-Polish-German drama film directed by Lívia Gyarmathy.

== Premise ==
The Polish website kinonagranicy describes the film as follows, "Created in a wave of reckoning with the Stalinist past, the film tells the story of Gyuly Molnár's (Note: Not to be confused with a more recent Hungarian politician, Gyula Molnár.) authentic escape from the closely guarded Recsk forced labor camp, where “enemies of the people” were imprisoned in the 1950s."

== Themes ==
The film was noted for its documented description of the life in the camp of Recsk.
