= Jerzy Trela =

Polish actor (1942–2022)

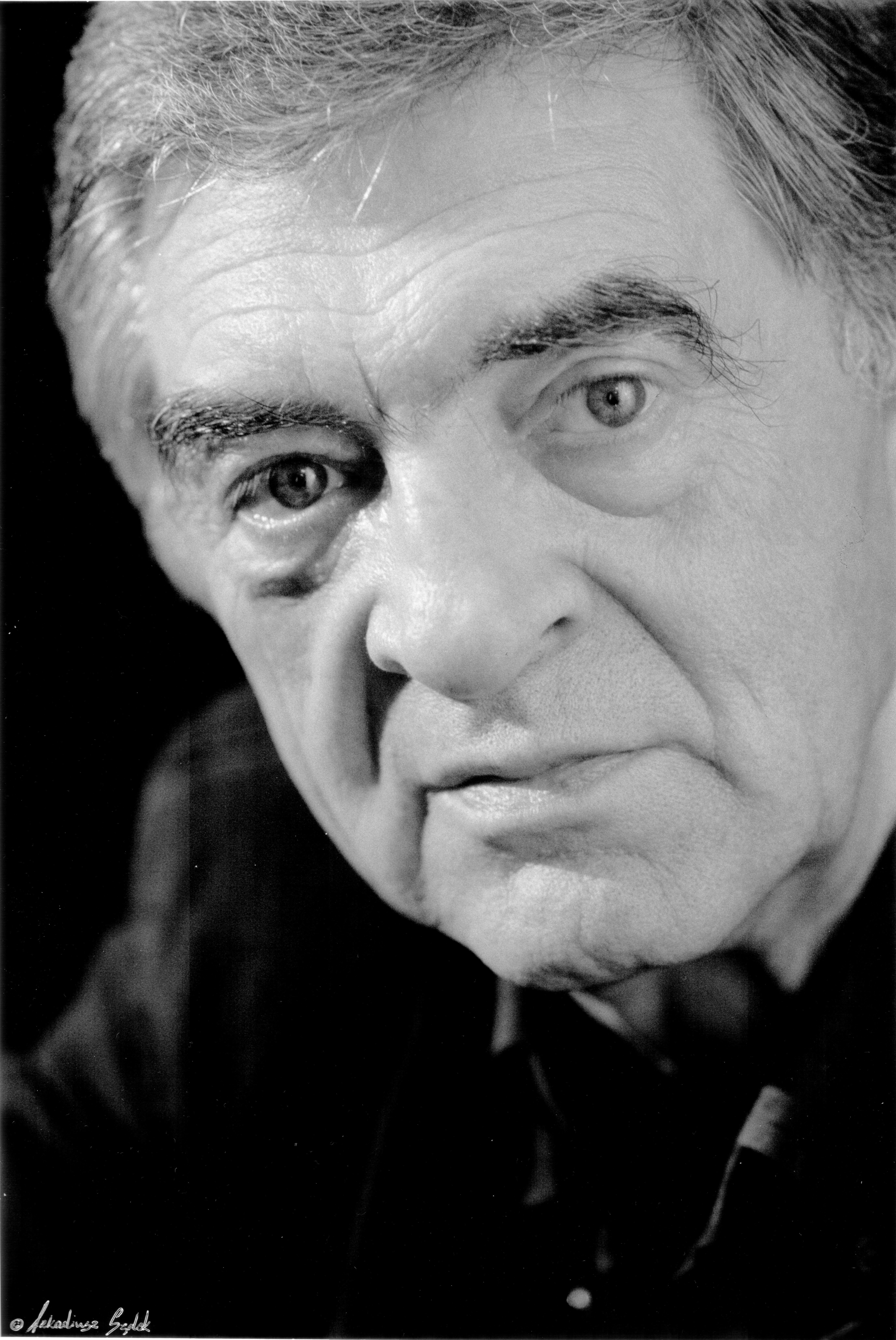
- Trela, c. 2004
- Born: 14 March 1942; Leńcze, General Government
- Died: 15 May 2022 (aged 80); Kraków, Poland
- Education: Ludwik Solski Academy of Dramatic Art in Kraków
- Occupation: actor
- Years active: 1969–2022
- Honours: Commander's Cross with Star of Order of Polonia Restituta Commander's Cross of Order of Polonia Restituta Knight's Cross of Order of Polonia Restituta Gold Medal for Merit to Culture – Gloria Artis Decoration of Honor Meritorious for Polish Culture

Jerzy Józef Trela (14 March 1942 – 15 May 2022) was a Polish actor. In 2003 he starred in the film An Ancient Tale: When the Sun Was a God under Jerzy Hoffman. He is also known for White (1994), Quo Vadis (2001) and Ida (2013).

Trela played also many roles on stage at The Old Theatre in Kraków (Polish: Narodowy Stary Teatr im. Heleny Modrzejewskiej w Krakowie) and he was Professor and Rector at the Ludwik Solski Academy for the Dramatic Arts.

== Honours and awards ==
- Meritorious for Polish Culture (1989)
- Commander's Cross with Star of the Order of Polonia Restituta (2011), previously awarded the Commander's Cross (2000) and Knight's Cross (1981)
- Polish Film Awards: Eagles for Best Supporting Actor in Quo Vadis (2002)
- Gold Medal "Gloria Artis" (2005)

== Selected filmography ==
- The Moth (1980)
- W biały dzień (1980) as painter, friend of “Korab”
- Man of Iron (1981)
- Danton (1983)
- The Night of the Emerald Moon (1985)
- Magnat (1987)
- The Mother of Kings (1987)
- Dekalog: Nine (1988)
- On the Silver Globe (1988)
- Three Colours: White (1994)
- Pan Tadeusz (1999)
- Dinosaur (2000, Polish dub)
- Quo Vadis (2001)
- An Ancient Tale: When the Sun Was a God (2003)
- Hope (2007)
- Ida (2013) as Szymon Skiba
- A Grain of Truth (2015)
- Artyści (2016) as the ghost of professor Konrad Kazanowicz
- The Elements of Sasza – Fire (2020) as "Grandpa"
