= The Doll (Prus novel) =

1890 novel by Bolesław Prus

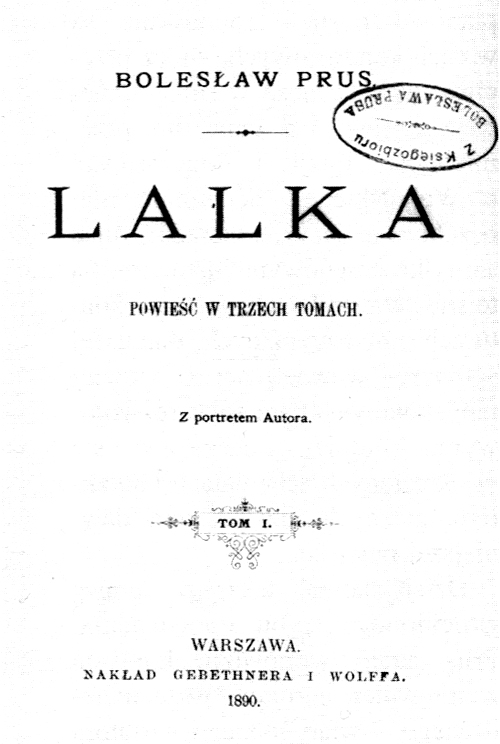
- Title page of volume 1 of the novel's first book edition, 1890.
- Author: Bolesław Prus
- Original title: Lalka
- Language: Polish
- Genre: Sociological novel
- Publisher: Gebethner i Wolff
- Publication date: newspaper, 1887–1889; book form, 1890
- Publication place: Poland
- Media type: Newspaper, hardback, paperback
- Original text: Lalka at Polish Wikisource

The Doll (Polish: Lalka) is a realist novel by the Polish writer Bolesław Prus, first published in periodical form between 1887 and 1889, and released as a book in 1890. The story centers on Stanisław Wokulski, a successful merchant whose unrequited love for the aristocratic Izabela Łęcka exposes the social inequalities, class divisions, and contradictions of 19th-century Warsaw. The novel's title has a dual referent as it derives from a minor episode involving a stolen toy, while also serving as a metaphorical reference to the novel's principal female character.

A major theme of The Doll is the conflict between different social classes and the limitations imposed by social stratification. The novel portrays an aristocracy that retains considerable social prestige despite its declining economic position, alongside a growing middle class bourgeoisie whose wealth does not provide social acceptance. Prus examines poverty, inequality, prejudice, antisemitism, the position of women, and the difficulties in attempting to ameliorate social circumstances. The novel's combination of personal tragedy and social observation allowed Prus to examine the tensions between romantic ideals and the practical values of society. Most of the story is presented by a third-person narrator who follows the characters, while substantial sections consist of the diary of Ignacy Rzecki, Wokulski's older associate and trusted shopkeeper.

The novel has been regarded by some, including Nobel laureate Czesław Miłosz, as the greatest Polish novel. According to Prus biographer Zygmunt Szweykowski, it may be unique in 19th-century world literature as a comprehensive, compelling picture of an entire society. However, Aleksander Świętochowski and other Positivist writers were quite critical of the work, claiming that it is ambiguous and psychologically complex. It has been translated into twenty-eight languages, and has been produced in several film versions and, most famously, as a television miniseries in 1977.

== Title ==
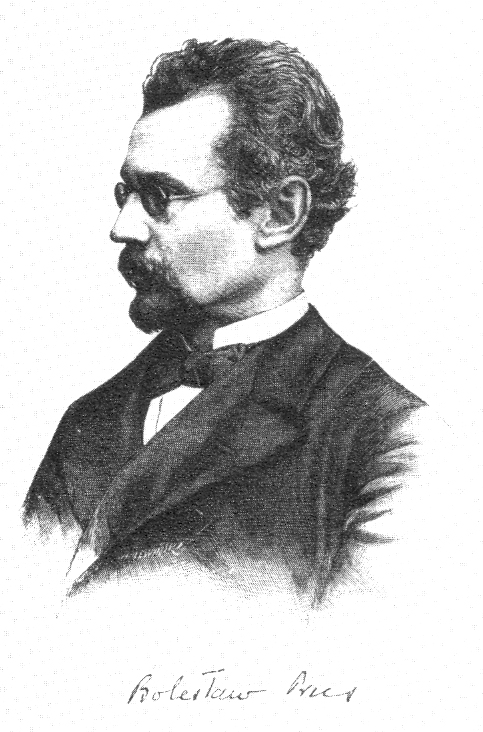
Prus, frontispiece to 1890 book edition of The Doll

The title of the novel remains the subject of debate and varying interpretations. The most common interpretation associates it with the character of Izabela Łęcka, a beautiful but spoiled and emotionally shallow young aristocratic woman. In the novel itself, Mrs Zasławska uses the word "dolls" to describe spoiled young women of the aristocracy. Elsewhere, Rzecki arranges mechanical dolls on a shop counter and sets them in motion, suggesting that the world depicted in the novel resembles a puppet theatre.

Prus himself, however, explained the title differently. In a letter to Władysław Korotyński, he wrote: "In the novel The Doll, there is a chapter devoted to a trial concerning the theft of a doll, an actual child’s doll. Such a trial really took place in Vienna. Since this incident caused the whole novel to crystallize and come together in my mind, out of gratitude I used the word 'doll' as its title. The novel they are discussing ought to have been entitled Three Generations. Perhaps it would even have been better understood under that title". The trial did in fact take place in Brno and was reported in the Polish press on 9 February 1887. A young, impoverished woman was accused of stealing a doll from the home of a wealthy acquaintance. When the doll was cut open, the mark of the shopkeeper from whom the accused had purchased the toy was found inside. This proved that the doll was not the same one that had disappeared from the accuser’s home. The trial ended in her acquittal.

Prus recreated this episode in the novel. Helena Stawska is accused of stealing a doll for her daughter by Baroness Krzeszowska, while the toy itself had been purchased at Wokulski’s store. The case is resolved in the courtroom in exactly the same way.

Nevertheless, at the time, the term “dolls” was also used disparagingly to describe members of the upper classes, particularly young women displayed like dolls on the marriage market. The expression was popularized by Józef Ignacy Kraszewski in his 1873 novel Lalki: Sceny przedślubne (transl. Dolls: Pre-Wedding Scenes). Moreover, the instalment describing the ball at the Łęckis’ home (later chapter "Ladies and Women" in volume II), appeared in the 3 March 1889 issue of "Kurier Codzienny" alongside an article entitled Dolls, which criticized the ball as a kind of marriage market where young women were put on display.

== Structure ==
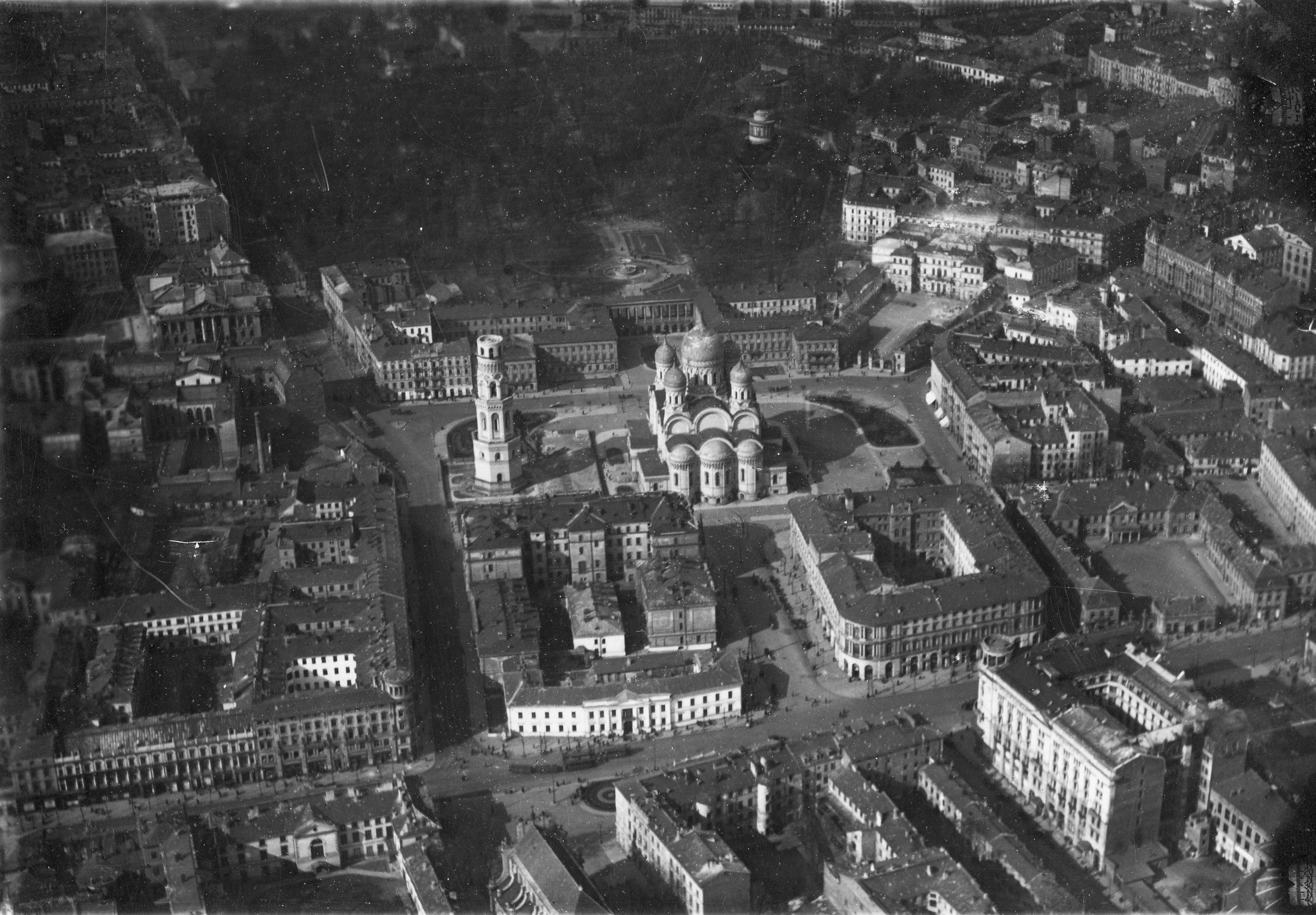
Archival aerial view of Krakowskie Przedmieście Street and the Saxon Square in Warsaw. Prus located Wokulski's store on Krakowskie Przedmieście, approximately in the area visible in the bottom-left corner of the photograph. The exact location is not specified in the novel.

The novel was not initially published as a complete book, but appeared in installments in the Kurier Codzienny, beginning on 29 September 1887 and continuing until 24 May 1889. Prus was already a successful journalist, columnist and a regular contributor to the newspaper. While writing the novel, Prus drew on his own notes and records of current affairs, made during the period in which the story is set. Readers received the novel progressively, and the newspaper's schedule imposed practical demands on Prus's composition. Publication was not continuous; in 1888 there was a substantial interruption after Prus left Warsaw for Nałęczów. The newspaper context shaped how contemporary readers encountered the novel and placed it alongside reports on current events.

The collated story was eventually published as a novel in 1890 by Gebethner i Wolff. Prus revised the structure of the work, altered the division into chapters and volumes, and made various textual corrections and deletions prior to publication. Prus had originally intended to name the book Three Generations.

The Doll, whose main action spans a year and a half, comprises two parallel narratives. One begins with the events of 1878 and follows the career of the protagonist, Stanisław Wokulski, a man in early middle age. The other, presented in the form of a diary kept by Wokulski's older friend Ignacy Rzecki, takes the reader back to the 1848–49 Spring of Nations. According to Przemysław Pietrzak, this gives the novel a “total” character. Its scope extends across past and future, Warsaw and the Polish provinces, Paris and Central and Eastern Europe, and all strata of society. It blends genres and moods, at times even taking on the character of reportage.

Bolesław Prus wrote The Doll with such close attention to the physical details of Warsaw that, during the interwar period, it was possible to identify the actual buildings on Krakowskie Przedmieście where Wokulski was depicted as living and running his store.

== Plot ==
Replica of Wokulski’s store on Krakowskie Przedmieście built for 2026 film adaptation

Wokulski begins his career as a waiter at Hopfer's, a Warsaw restaurant. The scion of an impoverished Polish noble family dreams of a life in science. After taking part in the failed 1863 Uprising against the Russian Empire, he is sentenced to exile in Siberia. On eventual return to Warsaw, he becomes a salesman at Mincel's haberdashery. Marrying the late owner's widow (who eventually dies), he comes into money and uses it to set up a partnership with a Russian merchant he had met while in exile. The two merchants go to Bulgaria during the Russo-Turkish War of 1877–1878, and Wokulski makes a fortune supplying the Russian Army.

Wokulski now proves a romantic at heart, falling in love with Izabela, daughter of the vacuous, bankrupt aristocrat, Tomasz Łęcki.

The manager of Wokulski's Warsaw store, Ignacy Rzecki, is a man of an earlier generation, a modest bachelor who lives on memories of his youth, which was a heroic chapter in his own life and that of Europe. Through his diary the reader learns about some of Wokulski's adventures, seen through the eyes of an admirer. Rzecki and his friend Katz had gone to Hungary in 1848 to enlist in the revolutionary army. For Rzecki, the cause of freedom in Europe is connected with the name of Napoleon Bonaparte, and the Hungarian revolution had sparked new hopes of abolishing the reactionary system that had triumphed at Napoleon's fall. Later he had reposed his hopes in Napoleon III. Now, as he writes, he places them in Bonaparte's scion, Napoleon III's son, Prince Loulou. At the novel's end, when Rzecki hears that Loulou has perished in Africa, fighting in British ranks against rebel tribesmen, he will be overcome by the despondence of old age. Rzecki is considered a representative of the Romantic era.

For now, Rzecki lives in constant excitement, preoccupied by politics, which he refers to in his diary by the code-letter "P." Everywhere in the press he finds indications that a long-awaited "it" is beginning.

In addition to the two generations represented by Rzecki and Wokulski, the novel provides glimpses of a third, younger one, exemplified in the scientist Julian Ochocki (modeled on Prus' friend, Julian Ochorowicz), some students, and young salesmen at Wokulski's store. The half-starving students inhabit the garret of an apartment house and are in constant conflict with the landlord over their arrears of rent; they are rebels, are inclined to macabre pranks, and are probably socialists. Also of socialist persuasion is a young salesman, whereas some of the latter's colleagues believe first and last in personal gain.

The Doll's plot focuses on Wokulski's infatuation with the superficial Izabela, who sees him only as a plebeian intruder into her rarefied world, a brute with huge red hands; for her, persons below the social standing of aristocrats are hardly human.

Wokulski, in his quest to win Izabela, begins frequenting theaters and aristocratic salons; and, to help her financially distressed father, founds a company and sets the aristocrats up as shareholders in the business. Eventually, Wokulski manages to get engaged to Izabela, but she continues to flirt with Starski. Wokulski decides to commit suicide after he overhears a converstation between Łęcka and Starski. He is saved by the railwayman Wysocki and disappears.

Wokulski's eventual downfall highlights The Doll's overarching theme: the inertia of Polish society.

== Alter egos ==
Wokulski and Rzecki are in many ways alter egos for the book's author. The frustrated scientist Wokulski is created in Prus' own image. During a visit to Paris, Wokulski meets an old scientist named Geist (whose name is German for "Spirit"), who is trying to discover a metal lighter than air; in the hands of those who would use it to organize mankind, it could bring universal peace and happiness. Wokulski is torn between his misplaced, tragic love for Izabela and the idea of settling in Paris and using his fortune to perfect Geist's invention.

The Doll, rich in characters and observations from everyday Warsaw life, in Czesław Miłosz's opinion embodies 19th-century realistic prose at its best. It brings its protagonist to a full awareness of the chasm that stretches between his dreams and the social reality that surrounds him.

== Translations ==
The Doll has been translated into 28 languages: Armenian, Belarusian, Bulgarian, Chinese, Croatian, Czech, Dutch, English, Esperanto, Estonian, French, Georgian, German, Hebrew, Hungarian, Italian, Japanese (2017), Korean, Latvian, Lithuanian, Macedonian, Romanian, Russian, Serbian, Slovak, Slovenian, Spanish, Ukrainian.

== Adaptations ==
=== Film ===
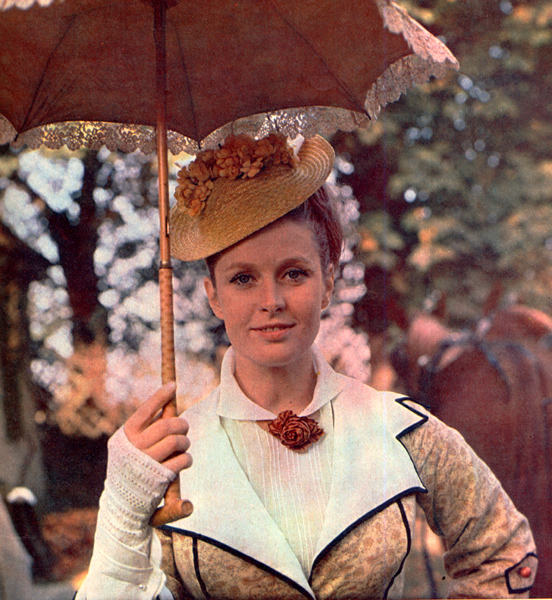
Beata Tyszkiewicz as Izabela Łęcka in the 1968 film adaptation by Wojciech Has

- 1968: The Doll, directed by Wojciech Has with Mariusz Dmochowski and Beata Tyszkiewicz.
- 2026: The Doll, directed by Maciej Kawalski with Marcin Dorociński and Kamila Urzędowska. The release had been set for 30 September 2026.

=== Television ===
- 1977: Lalka.
- 2026: The Doll, a limited-run TV series produced by Netflix directed by Paweł Maślona with Tomasz Schuchardt and Sandra Drzymalska.

== Sources ==
- Fita, Stanisław, ed. (1962). Wspomnienia o Bolesławie Prusie [Reminiscences about Bolesław Prus]. Warsaw: Państwowy Instytut Wydawniczy.
- Markiewicz, Henryk (1967). "Lalka" Bolesława Prusa [Bolesław Prus' The Doll]. Warsaw: Czytelnik.
- Miłosz, Czesław (1983). The History of Polish Literature (2nd ed.). Berkeley: University of California Press. pp. 295–299. ISBN 978-0-520-04477-7.
- Pietrzak, Przemysław (2015). "Felieton, gazeta, powieść - o pewnym genologicznym kontekście "Lalki" Bolesława Prusa" [A Feuilleton, a Newspaper, and a Novel: On Some Literary Genetics Context of "Lalka" ("The Doll") by Bolesław Prus]. Pamiętnik Literacki. 106 (4).
- Pieścikowski, Edward (1985). Bolesław Prus (2nd ed.). Warsaw: Państwowe Wydawnictwo Naukowe. ISBN 978-83-01-05593-6.
- Prus, Bolesław (1996). Tołczyk, Dariusz; Zaranko, Anna (eds.). The Doll. Translated by Welsh, David. Budapest: Central European University Press. ISBN 978-1-85866-065-3.
- Szweykowski, Zygmunt (1972). Twórczość Bolesława Prusa [The Art of Bolesław Prus] (2nd ed.). Warsaw: Państwowy Instytut Wydawniczy. pp. 152–213.
