= European market =

The European market may refer to:

- European Union (EU), an economic union of European member states
- European single market, the single market comprising member states of the European Union
- European Economic Area (EEA), the European single market extending into member states of the European Free Trade Association
- European Economic Community (EEC), defunct organization formerly known as European Common Market (ECM)
- European Free Trade Association (EFTA), the non-EU states in the single market

== See also ==
- New Europe Market, annual marketing conference event in Dubrovnik, Croatia
