= Fan Fiction =

Fan fiction is fictional writing written in an unauthorized amateur capacity as fans, which is based on an existing work of fiction.

Fan Fiction may also refer to:

- "Fan Fiction" (Supernatural), a season 10 episode of Supernatural
- "Fan Fiction" (Only Murders in the Building), a 2021 episode of the TV series Only Murders in the Building
- "Fan Fiction", a song by Bug Hunter from the album Happiness (Without a Catch)
- Fanfic (film), a 2023 Polish film

== Other uses ==
- FanFiction.Net, US fanfiction website
- Pastiche, unauthorized professional derivative fiction
- Fan Fiction: A Mem-Noir Inspired by True Events, a fictionalized memoir by Brent Spiner
