= Dobromir Dymecki =

Polish actor (born 1985)

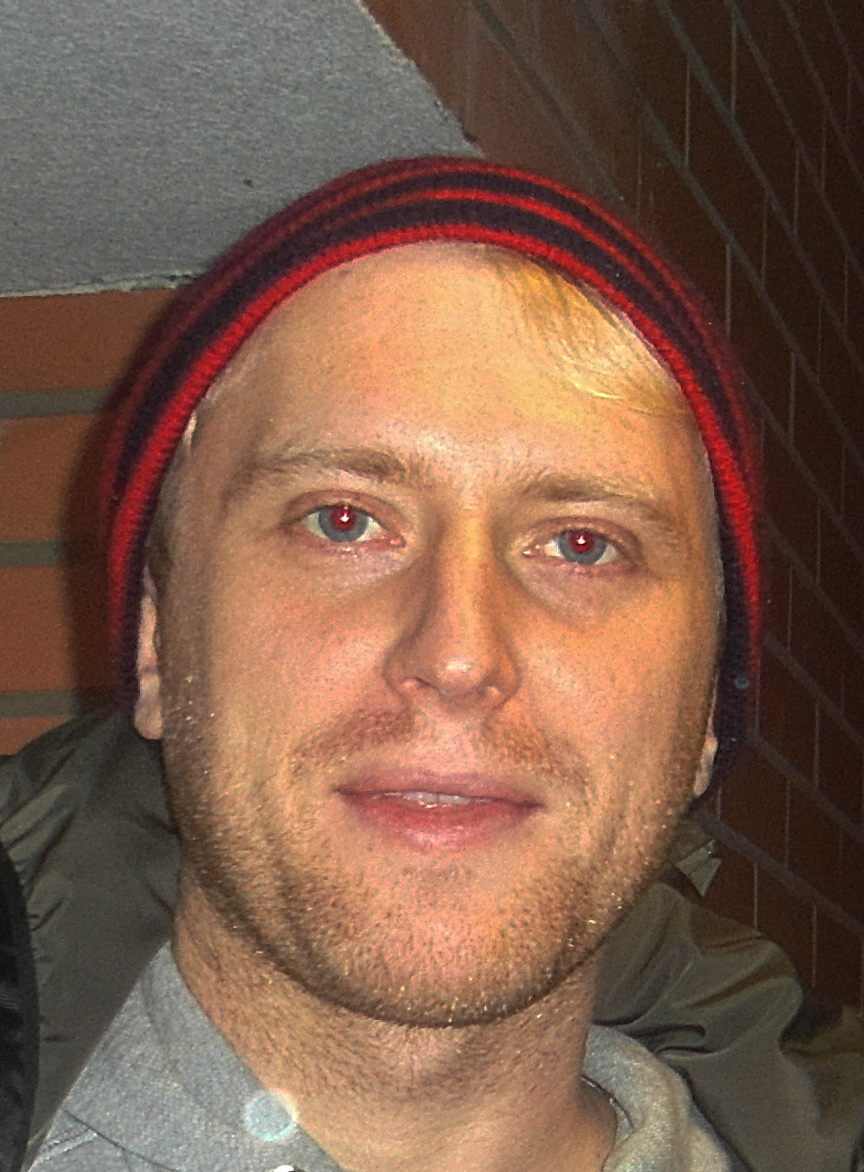
- Dymecki in 2011
- Born: 3 October 1985 (age 40); Łódź, Poland
- Education: Łódź Film School
- Occupation: Actor
- Years active: 2007–present

Dobromir Dymecki (born 3 October 1985) is a Polish actor.

== Biography ==
Dymecki was born in Łódź and grew up in Konstantynów Łódzki. He has an older brother. His father ran a textile factory that went bankrupt after the fall of the Polish People's Republic; his family later opened a shop in the mid-1990s.

He graduated from the Łódź Film School in 2009. He has worked at the Stefan Jaracz Theatre and the New Theatre in Łódź, as well as the Teatr Imka, the Teatr Powszechny, and the Teatr Dramatyczny in Warsaw.

== Filmography ==
=== Film ===
Year	Title	Role	Ref.
2007	U Pana Boga w ogródku	Witaszek	
2009	U Pana Boga za miedzą	Witaszek	
2009	Afonia i pszczoły	Wacław	
2010	Huśtawka	Piotr	
2011	Uwikłanie	Officer Kumerski	
2012	Big Love	Kudłacz	
2012	Felix, Net i Nika oraz Teoretycznie Możliwa Katastrofa	Brenner	
2016	Planet Single	Oskar	
2017	Volta	Rudy	
2017	Double Trouble	Rudy	
2018	Mug	Doctor	
2018	Pitbull. Ostatni pies	Obuch	
2018	53 Wars	Paweł	
2018	Pardon	Brother Andrzej	
2018	The Butler	Father Riese	
2019	Nothing Is Lost	Therapist	
2019	All for My Mother	Tomasz	
2020	Love Tasting	Oliwia's father	
2020	Biały potok	Bartek	
2021	Prime Time	Commander	
2021	Jakoś to będzie	Albert Wąsik	
2021	Silent Land	Adam	
2021	Śmierć Zygielbojma	Jan Karski	
2022	Woman on the Roof	Prosecutor	
2022	A Night at the Kindergarten	Kazik Skuza	
2023	Saint	Marian Porębski	
2023	Fanfic	Tośka's father	
2023	Scarborn	Young nobleman	
2024	Sezony	Ziemowit	
2025	Zamach na papieża		
TBA	The Time That Never Came	Oskar	

=== Television ===
Year	Title	Role	Notes	Ref.
2009	Siostry	Franek Budzyk	2 episodes	
2010	Usta usta	Tomek	1 episode	
2010	Hotel 52	Przemek	1 episode	
2010–2016	Barwy szczęścia	Przemek Brodziński	56 episodes	
2011	Prosto w serce	Bernard Rogowski	1 episode	
2011	Days of Honor	Scharfuhrer Neumayer	2 episodes	
2012	Wszyscy kochają Romana	Marek	1 episode	
2012	Misja Afganistan	Karolina's brother	1 episode	
2013	True Law	Lawyer	1 episode	
2013	Na Wspólnej	Kazimierz Adamiak	23 episodes	
2013–2020	Komisarz Alex	Magik; Achim Kowalik; Radek Mariaszek	3 episodes	
2014–2015	The Ranch	Woodsman	6 episodes	
2015	Na dobre i na złe	Igor	1 episode	
2015	Nie rób scen	Marek	1 episode	
2015	Chłopiec malowany	Son	Television film	
2015	Biały dmuchawiec	Jan Liszaj	Television film	
2016	Artyści	Maciej	8 episodes	
2016	Komisja morderstw	Paweł Jaskólski	1 episode	
2017	O mnie się nie martw	Andrzej Radecki	1 episode	
2017	Ultraviolet	Father Banach	1 episode	
2017	Dzielni chłopcy	Krzyś	Television film	
2017	Spalenie Joanny	Lawyer	Television film	
2018	The Trap	Piotr Walczak	5 episodes	
2018	1983	Piotr Wybraniec	3 episodes	
2018–2020	Leśniczówka	Marcin Gałek	46 episodes	
2018–2020	Signs	Robert Paszke	13 episodes	
2017–2021	Father Matthew	Maksymilian Walencik; Radek Pukiel	2 episodes	
2021	Pajęczyna	Jakub Dąbrowa	1 episode	
2022	Powrót	Jehovah's Witness	1 episode	
2022	Glitter	Zbyszek	3 episodes	
2023	Sexify	Maks Oleksiak	7 episodes	
2023	Emigracja XD	Łukaszek	1 episode	
2023	BringBackAlice	Patryk's father	2 episodes	
2023–present	1670	Bogdan	Main role	
2024	Zrada	Bartek Czarciński	12 episodes	
2024	Profilerka	Marek Wigier	1 episode	
2025	Czarne stokrotki	Marek	8 episodes	
2025	Porządny człowiek	Karol	6 episodes	
2025	Project UFO	Stefan Kunik	3 episodes	
