= The Breslau Murders =

- Official Polish poster
- Genre: Crime drama; period drama
- Created by: Leszek Dawid
- Developed by: Leszek Dawid
- Written by: Bartosz Janiszewski; Magdalena Żakowska
- Directed by: Leszek Dawid
- Starring: Tomasz Schuchardt; Adam Bobik; Sandra Drzymalska; Przemysław Bluszcz; Ireneusz Czop; Agata Kulesza; Piotr Janusz; Karolina Gruszka
- Composer: Radzimir Dębski "Jimek"
- Country of origin: Poland
- Original language: Polish
- No. of seasons: 1
- No. of episodes: 8

Production
- Executive producer: Robert Wieczorek
- Producer: Andrzej Muszyński
- Cinematography: Paweł Flis
- Editors: Maciej Pawliński; Katarzyna Drozdowicz
- Running time: 43–49 minutes
- Production companies: ATM Grupa; ATM System; Black Photon

Original release
- Network: Disney+
- Release: 12 September 2025

The Breslau Murders (English: /ˈbɹɛz.laʊ̯/, German: [ˈbʁɛs.laʊ]; original Polish title: Breslau) is a Polish-language period crime drama television series directed by Leszek Dawid, and written by Bartosz Janiszewski and Magdalena Żakowska. Created by ATM Grupa in Poland, it was released on 12 September 2025 on the Disney+ streaming platform. The series have 8 episodes, with the run time of each ranging between 43 and 49 minutes. Set in 1936, it follows police detective Franz Podolsky, tasked with solving a murder in Breslau, Germany (now Wrocław, Poland), connected to the upcoming Summer Olympics in Berlin.

== Premise ==
In 1936, Germany is preparing for the upcoming Summer Olympics in Berlin. A murder in a hotel in Wrocław, then known by its German name as Breslau, is threatening to disrupt the propaganda campaign and the sports competitions. Police officer Franz Podolsky, known for lack of objections to use less than conventional and ethical methods to bring justice, is brought to solve the case. Having been suspended a few months prior, for killing a suspect in another murder case, this is his opportunity to prove himself and be permanently reinstated into service. Soon after beginning the investigation, Podolsky realises the case is a part of a much larger conspiracy.

== Cast ==
- Tomasz Schuchardt as Franz Podolsky
- Adam Bobik as Erwin Benk
- Sandra Drzymalska as Lena Podolsky
- Przemysław Bluszcz as Leopold Barens
- Ireneusz Czop as Johann Holtz
- Agata Kulesza as Gerda Holtz
- Piotr Janusz as Andrew Fox
- Karolina Gruszka as Dr. Inga Eissmann
- Jakub Sierenberg as Jürgen Holtz
- Bartłomiej Deklewa as Karol Mauer
- Jan Hrynkiewicz as Abram Niepold
- Radosław Krzyżowski as Bernard von Blumenstein
- Marcel Sabat as Helmut Braun
- Sylwia Boroń as Ewa
- Przemysław Kozłowski as Gustav Krepke
- Hubert Woliński as Joachim Podolsky
- Patryk Świderski as Jürgen Holtz (junior)
- Grażyna Sobocińska as Klara
- Bartosz Mikulak as Klaus Ente
- Zofia Domalik as Kiki
- Marcin Czarnik as Uwe Gerber

== Production ==
The television series was announced in May 2024. It was directed by Leszek Dawid, and written by Bartosz Janiszewski and Magdalena Żakowska. It was produced by Andrzej Muszyński, with Magdalena Cieślak as the executive producer, Robert Wieczorek as the creative producer, and Agnieszka Dec as the production manager. The series was starred by Tomasz Schuchardt, Adam Bobik, Sandra Drzymalska, Przemysław Bluszcz, Ireneusz Czop, Agata Kulesza, Piotr Janusz, and Karolina Gruszka. The cinematography was done by Paweł Flis, editing by Maciej Pawliński and Katarzyna Drozdowicz, music by Radzimir Dębski "Jimek", and sound mixing by Monika Krzanowska and Maciej Pawłowski. The scenography was done by Paweł Jarzębski, interior design by Anna Grabowska-Paciorek, costumes by Agata Culak, and characterisation by Monika Jan-Łechtańska. The series was produced in 2025 by ATM Grupa, together with ATM System, and Black Photon. The majority of filming took place in Wrocław, Poland, and also included other localities in Lower Silesian Voivodeship, Warsaw Zoo and a palace in Falenty. It was financed by the Polish Film Institute and the Lower Silesian Film Centre. The series premiered on 9 September 2025 in the Arnold Szyfman Polish Theatre in Warsaw, Poland, and was released on the Disney+ streaming platform on 12 September 2025. It bcreae its first production created in Poland, and the region of the Central and Eastern Europe. It has 8 episodes, with the run time of each ranging between 43 and 49 minutes.

To promote the series, artists Natalia Przybysz and Igor Herbut recorded a cover of the song "Blondynki, brunetki", originally performed Jan Kiepura. It was done in cooperation between Disney+ and the Męskie Granie concert tour company.

== Reception ==
=== Critical response ===
The series was awarded at the 2025 New Europe Market in Dubrovnik, Croatia, in the category Best Finished TV series in the CEE. It is also nominated to the 2026 Polish Film Award in the category for the best fiction television series.

=== Awards and nominations ===
Award	Year	Category	Recipient(s)	Result	Ref.
New Europe Market	2025	Best Finished TV series in the CEE	The Breslau Murders	Won	
Polish Film Award	2026	Best Fiction Television Series	The Breslau Murders	Nominated	
