= The Doll (2026 film) =

2026 film by Maciej Kawalski

- Theatrical release poster
- Directed by: Maciej Kawalski
- Written by: Maciej Kawalski; Łukasz Światowiec; Piotr Sobociński jr
- Based on: The Doll by Bolesław Prus
- Produced by: Radosław Drabik
- Starring: Marcin Dorociński; Kamila Urzędowska; Marek Kondrat
- Cinematography: Piotr Sobociński jr
- Music by: Łukasz Targosz
- Production companies: Gigant Films; TVN Warner Bros. Discovery
- Distributed by: Kino Świat
- Release date: 30 September 2026
- Running time: 166 minutes
- Country: Poland
- Language: Polish
- Budget: €15 million

The Doll (Polish: Lalka) is a 2026 Polish period romantic drama film directed by Maciej Kawalski and written by Kawalski and Łukasz Światowiec. The film is an adaptation of the novel The Doll by Bolesław Prus, widely regarded as one of the greatest works of Polish literature. It is the second adaptation after the 1968 film. The film stars Marcin Dorociński as main character Stanisław Wokulski, Kamila Urzędowska as Izabela Łęcka and Marek Kondrat as Ignacy Rzecki. It also features an ensemble cast that includes Krystyna Janda, Agata Kulesza, Maja Komorowska, Karolina Gruszka, Maja Ostaszewska, Maria Dębska, Andrzej Chyra, Mateusz Damięcki, Borys Szyc, Cezary Żak, Andrzej Seweryn, Dawid Ogrodnik, Maciej Stuhr and Filip Pławiak.

The film was released in Poland on 30 September 2026 by Kino Świat. With a production budget of €15 million, it is one of the most expensive Polish films ever made.

== Cast ==
- Marcin Dorociński as Stanisław Wokulski
- Kamila Urzędowska as Izabela Łęcka
- Marek Kondrat as Ignacy Rzecki
- Agata Kulesza as Pani Meliton
- Maja Komorowska as President Zasławska
- Andrzej Seweryn as Tomasz Łęcki
- Karolina Gruszka as Florentyna
- Maria Dębska as Kazimiera Wąsowska
- Mateusz Damięcki as Kazimierz Starski
- Krystyna Janda as Countess Joanna Karolowa
- Maja Ostaszewska as Baronowa Krzeszowska
- Borys Szyc as Baron Krzeszowski
- Cezary Żak as Baron Dalski
- Filip Pławiak as Julian Ochocki
- Dawid Ogrodnik as Mraczewski
- Maciej Musiałowski as Maruszewicz
- Andrzej Chyra as prof. Bernard Geist
- Maciej Stuhr as Michał Szuman
- Paweł Wilczak as Henryk Szlangbaum

== Production ==
The cast of the film in April 2026

The film adaptation directed by Maciej Kawalski and produced by Gigant Films was announced in July 2024. Casting announcement began in March 2025 with Marcin Dorociński was cast as Stanisław Wokulski on 25 March, Kamila Urzędowska as Izabela Łęcka on 15 April, and Marek Kondrat as Ignacy Rzecki on 18 June, marking the latter's acting return after 15 years in retirement. On 11 July, Agata Kulesza was cast as Pani Meliton, and on 16 July Andrzej Seweryn as Izabela's father. Later, Mateusz Damięcki was cast as Kazimierz Starski, Karolina Gruszka as Florentyna, Krystyna Janda as Countess Joanna Karolowa, and Maja Ostaszewska and Borys Szyc as Baronowa and Baron Krzeszowski.

Principal photography began on 22 July 2025 and took place at the Ujazdów Avenue, Warsaw. In January 2026 TVN Warner Bros. Discovery joined the production as a co-producer.

== See also ==
- The Doll (TV series), a 2026 Netflix television series adaptation
