= Michał Sosna =

Polish cinematographer and visual artist (born 1982)

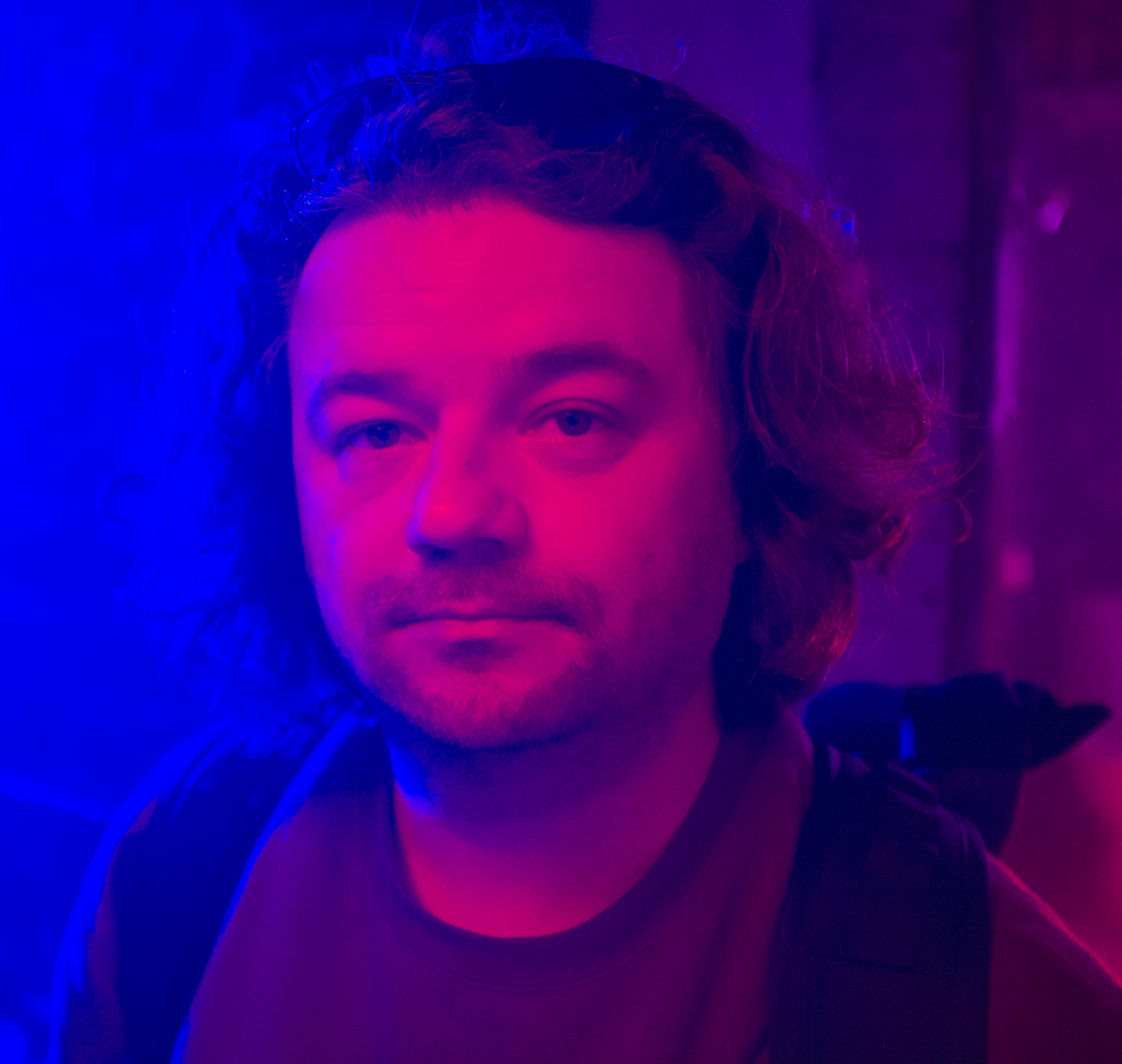
- Michał Sosna, 2023
- Born: 1982 (age 43–44)
- Citizenship: Polish
- Occupations: Cinematographer, visual artist

Michał Sosna (born 1982) is a cinematographer, visual artist and academic teacher.

== Filmography ==
=== Director of photography ===
- Hycel (2015), short film
- T for Taj Mahal (2017)
- Zaprawdę Hitler umarł (2025)
- Otchłań (2025), TV series

== Art books ==
- Kobiety delikatne jak bomby. 2020.
- No pic no chat. Autonomy. Michał Sosna. 2021. ISBN 9788396184801.
