= Czarne stokrotki =

Polish television drama series

- Also known as: Black Daisies, Strange Angels
- Genre: Crime thriller, supernatural mystery
- Created by: Dominika Prejdova, Agnieszka Szpila
- Screenplay by: Marcin Ciaston; Dominika Prejdova; Agnieszka Szpila; Katarzyna Tybinka
- Directed by: Mariusza Paleja
- Starring: Karolina Kominek; Dawid Ogrodnik; Edyta Olszówka; Alicja Wieniawa-Narkiewicz; Dobromir Dymecki; Piotr Żurawski
- Composer: Wojciech Grabek
- Country of origin: Poland
- Original languages: Polish, Czech, Roma, German
- No. of seasons: 1
- No. of episodes: 8

Production
- Producers: Magdalena Kaminska, Agata Szymanska
- Running time: 50 min.

Original release
- Network: Canal+
- Release: 3 January – 14 February 2025

Czarne stokrotki (Literally: Black Daisies) or Strange Angels (in some markets) is a Polish crime thriller and supernatural mystery TV series, which was broadcast from 3 January 2025 via Canal+. Its eight episodes were created by Dominika Prejdova and Agnieszka Szpila, directed by Mariusza Paleja with screenplay by Prejdova, Szpila, Marcin Ciaston and Katarzyna Tybinka. It stars Karolina Kominek as Lena, who returns to her hometown of Wałbrzych in search of her estranged teenage daughter Ada (Alicja Wieniawa-Narkiewicz). Lena enlists former school friend, Rafał (Dawid Ogrodnik), a local police detective. Ada disappeared while supervising five school children. Lena and Rafal's investigation leads to coal mining tunnels and a World War 2-era sanatorium, Black Daisy. Thwarting their search is sanatorium owner, Marta (Edyta Olszówka), who feigns a philanthropic façade while sponsoring clandestine human rejuvenation research and ordering the gassing of police with cyanide. The first two episodes were previewed at the BNP Paribas Warsaw Serialcon on 6 December 2024.

== Premise ==
Ada investigates long-abandoned coal mines and tunnels below the Wałbrzych area. She takes five school children with her. Lena's geological survey trip is interrupted when she learns Ada has disappeared. Lena returns to Wałbrzych and teams up with Rafał to conduct an unofficial investigation. Police advise that Ada kidnapped the children. Konstanty informs Marta that Ada led children through Black Daisy's hidden laboratory. Ada's friends Tymek and Filip look for her in tunnels. Konstanty treats Marta's back scars with horseshoe crab serum, which briefly revives her skin. Marta orders Smolarz to illegally bomb various tunnels, thereby trapping Ada with three children. Meanwhile two children, who were separated, stumble out of the tunnels. Marta convinces their mothers to transfer the two comatose children to the Black Daisy clinic. Tymek is bitten in an underground pool, he also becomes comatose.

When police mount a rescue mission into those tunnels, Marta directs Smolarz to release cyanide gas, killing three officers. Captain Naczelnik disbelieves Rafał's claim of Marta's involvement: Rafał is suspended. Lena discovers her mother, Eva was abandoned by her grandmother, Ilse. Ilse was an adherent of the Vril cult, which ran a Nazi-era sanatorium researching horseshoe crab serum. Konstanty had used that research to develop treatments for Marta and her rich clients. Ilse's contemporary, Sznirel had a Vril crystal embedded in his forearm, which conferred longevity. Marta and Smolarz steal this crystal; Sznirel finally dies. Tymek is also brought to Black Daisy. Lena has visions, which variously feature Ada, Eva or Ilse. Tymek and two children wake; they steal the Vril crystal from Marta's study. Tymek delivers it and the children to Lena. Lena takes them to the local reservoir. All three jump into the water.

== Cast and characters ==
=== Main cast ===
- Karolina Kominek as Lena Opalińska: Warsaw-based glaciologist, Ada's mother, diagnosed with Wilson's disease after attempting to drown Ada. Zdenek & Eva's daughter
- Dawid Ogrodnik as Rafał Nieć: Wałbrzych police detective sergeant, Lena's childhood friend, Luka's lover
- Edyta Olszówka as Marta Czarnecka: influential businesswoman, Black Daisy owner (sanatorium: spa, rejuvenation clinic) anthracite mine owner, philanthropist
- Alicja Wieniawa-Narkiewicz as Ada Opalińska: Lena's 16-year-old daughter, Filip & Tymek's friend, explores mine shafts, tunnels
- Dobromir Dymecki as Marek Opaliński: Ada & Ignacy's father, Maja's husband, Lena's ex-husband
- Piotr Żurawski as Luka Kaliski: Romani musician, music teacher, Rafał's clandestine lover
- Olaf Lubaszenko as Konstanty Lubiński: Black Daisy's research scientist, studies horseshoe crab physiology
- Robert Gonera as Smolarz: Black Daisy's lead coal miner, Marta's main henchman
- Tomasz Schuchardt as Majcher: police detective, Rafał's rival, Smolarz' informant
- Roman Gancarczyk as Naczelnik: police captain, Rafał & Majcher's boss
- Teodor Koziar as Tymek Szolc: Elzunia, Szolc's son. Ada's school friend, assists searching tunnels
- Gracjan Kosyl as Filip Kordecki: Adrian's brother, Ada's school friend, assists searching tunnels
- Philip Lenkowsky as Sznirel: (born 1885) wastrel, caravan resident, Ilse's associate
- Sonia Roszczuk as Ilse Grünn (Zielinska): Eva's German mother, Lena's grandmother, nurse at sanatorium

=== Additional cast ===
- Wanda Czaplicka as Ewa: Black Daisy receptionist
- Paulina Gałązka as Maja Opalińska: Black Daisy nurse, Marek's wife, Ignacy's mother
- Jela Turek as Karolina Zabinska: school child, abducted by Ada
- Iwo Rajshi as Wiciu: school child, abducted by Ada
- Ida Kalinowska as Young Ada: Lena's primary age daughter
- Filip Kempiński as Adrian Kordeki: Tymek's older brother, drug dealer, Marta's gigolo
- Maria Kuśmierska as Ruda: Luka's sister, Dezo's daughter
- Aleks Kurozielewicz as Adas Bernat: school child, abducted by Ada
- Antoni Rychłowski as Kacper: Lena's boyfriend/work colleague
- Maria Partyka as Lusia Kopinska: school child, abducted by Ada
- Agnieszka Przepiórska as Elżbieta Szolc: Tymek's mother
- Vilem Udatny as Zdenek: Czechia resident, Lena's father, Ada's grandfather, Eva's widower, cannabis smoker, rock musician
- Mirosław Zbrojewicz as Dezo Kaliski: Luka's father, Romani patriarch

== Production ==
In July 2022 filming began for a Polish science fiction series provisionally titled, Strange Angels. Locations used were Wałbrzych, Gdynia, Nowa Ruda and Warsaw. In October 2023 the series was pre-premiered at the MIPCOM festival in Cannes, where it was listed as Variety magazine's best series. The title was changed to Czarne stokrotki (English: Black Daisies) and its official premiere on Canal+ was initially postponed to 2024. The first two episodes were previewed at the BNP Paribas Warsaw Serialcon on 6 December 2024. After further delays, its full premiere occurred on 3 January 2025 via the Canal+ online VOD platform and on the Canal+ Premium TV channel, with subsequent episodes presented every week until 14 February.
