= Julia Wyszyńska =

Polish actress (born 1986)

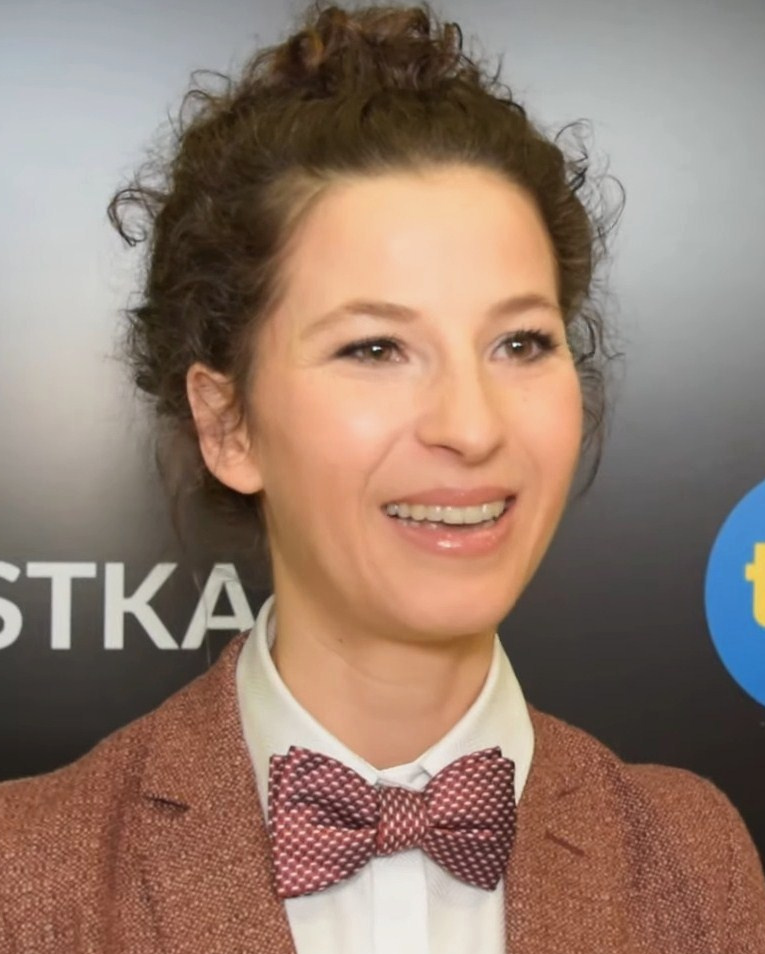
- Wyszyńska in 2019
- Born: 1986 (age 39–40); Mysłowice, Poland
- Education: AST National Academy of Theatre Arts in Kraków
- Occupation: Actress
- Years active: 2010–present

Julia Wyszyńska (Polish pronunciation: [ˈju.lja vɘˈʂɘɲ.ska]; born 1986) is a Polish actress.

== Early life ==
Wyszyńska was born in Mysłowice. Her mother is a psychotherapist and her father is a dentist. She graduated from the AST National Academy of Theatre Arts in Kraków in 2010.

== Career ==
In 2011, Wyszyńska starred in the play Medea, directed by Ewelina Marciniak. For her performance, she won the Grand Prix at the National Review of Contemporary Monodrama. She later worked at the Polish Theatre in Bydgoszcz before moving to the Teatr Powszechny in Warsaw.

In 2017, she starred in the play The Curse, directed by Oliver Frljić, in which she simulated oral sex on a statue of Pope John Paul II. The play sparked controversy in Poland. After its premiere, Jacek Kurski, president of Telewizja Polska, cancelled an upcoming Teatr Telewizji broadcast starring Wyszyńska, and she was publicly criticized by right-wing figures including Krystyna Pawłowicz and Stanisław Michalkiewicz.

In 2022, she wrote, directed, and starred in the play Fizyka kwantowa, czyli rozmowy nigdy nieprzeprowadzone at Komuna Warszawa.

== Filmography ==
=== Film ===
Year	Title	Role	Ref.
2017	Panic Attack	Wiktoria	
2018	Clergy	Nun	
2018	Miłość jest wszystkim	Ewa	
2020	Biały potok	Ewa	
2021	The Wedding	Rachela	
2022	Każdy wie lepiej	Sylwia	
2022	Noc w przedszkolu	Headmistress	

=== Television ===
Year	Title	Role	Notes	Ref.
2011	Days of Honor	Klara	6 episodes	
2012	Medics	Young doctor	1 episode	
2012	Hotel 52	Ada Kowalska	1 episode	
2012	Misja Afganistan	Agnieszka	4 episodes	
2013	2XL	Lilka	3 episodes	
2013–2016	Na dobre i na złe	Klaudia Miller	50 episodes	
2015	Komisarz Alex	Lila Grońska	1 episode	
2019	Szóstka	Olga Mirska	6 episodes	
2020	Mały zgon	Anna	10 episodes	
2022	Cracow Monsters	Ewa Zawadzka	5 episodes	
2022	Hold Tight	Officer Ewelina Miller	5 episodes	
2024	Gra z Cieniem	Pola Niedzielan	12 episodes	
2026	The Doll	Florentyna		
