= Angel of Death (Polish TV series) =

Polish crime drama television series

- Polish: Szadź
- Genre: Crime drama
- Based on: Szadź by Igor Brejdygant
- Written by: Paulina Murawska; Katarzyna Śliwińska-Kłosowicz; Michał Godzic; Anna Gronowska; Filip Syczynski; Karolina Szymczyk-Majchrzak; Igor Brejdygant
- Directed by: Sławomir Fabicki; Anna Kazejak; Maciej Bochniak
- Starring: Aleksandra Popławska; Maciej Stuhr; Anna Cieślak; Bartosz Gelner; Helena Zawistowska; Maxim Topyla
- Composer: Paweł Lucewicz
- Country of origin: Poland
- Original language: Polish
- No. of seasons: 4
- No. of episodes: 28

Production
- Executive producer: Michał Kwieciński
- Cinematography: Mikołaj Łebkowski; Michał Nowakowski
- Editors: Andrzej Kowalski; Przemysław Lisak
- Running time: 40–46 minutes
- Production company: Akson Studio

Original release
- Network: TVN; Player
- Release: 30 April 2020 – present

Angel of Death (Polish: Szadź, lit. 'Rime ice') is a Polish crime drama television series based on the novel Szadź by Igor Brejdygant. It began airing on TVN and Player on 30 April 2020.

== Premise ==
In Opole, a young woman is murdered by a serial killer. Commissioner Agnieszka Polkowska must face her own past to solve the case.

== Cast ==
- Aleksandra Popławska as Agnieszka Polkowska
- Maciej Stuhr as Piotr Wolnicki
- Anna Cieślak as Monika Wolnicka
- Bartosz Gelner as Tomasz Mrówiec
- Helena Zawistowska as Helenka Wolnicka
- Maxim Topyla as Janek Wolnicki
- Mirosław Zbrojewicz as Włodzimierz Suzin
- Emma Giegżno as Jola Polkowska
- Michał Kaleta as Roman Polkowski
- Anna Ilczuk as Lila Pelc
- Karolina Gorczyca as Ewelina Wrońska
- Marek Kalita as Commander
- Dominika Ostałowska as Teresa Sznajder
- Krzysztof Zarzecki as Ludwik Kowalik
- Wiktor Piechowski as Piotr Wolnicki
- Paulina Krzyżańska as Lila Pelc
- Magdalena Popławska as Karolina
- Piotr Trojan as Maciek Janik
- Jowita Budnik as Mira Janik
- Aleksandra Skraba as Natalia Barańska
- Lesław Żurek as Leszek
- Diana Zamojska as Agata
- Sebastian Pawlak as Artur
- Zofia Domalik as Ewa Banach
- Mateusz Burdach as Marcin Prawicki
- Cezary Łukaszewicz as Wojciech Błaszak
- Kinga Jasik as Ilona Kołeczek
- Sandra Drzymalska as Roma Sośnicka
- Dorota Krempa as Ania

== Episodes ==
=== Series overview ===
Series	Episodes	Originally released		
Series	Episodes	First released	Last released	Network
1	7	30 April 2020	11 June 2020	TVN; Player
2	7	11 May 2021	22 June 2021	TVN; Player
3	7	2 September 2022	14 October 2022	TVN; Player
4	7	4 October 2024	15 November 2024	TVN; Player

=== Season 1 ===
No. overall	No. in season	Title	Duration	Original release date
1	1	"Episode 1.1"	41 min	30 April 2020
2	2	"Episode 1.2"	42 min	7 May 2020
3	3	"Episode 1.3"	44 min	14 May 2020
4	4	"Episode 1.4"	41 min	21 May 2020
5	5	"Episode 1.5"	42 min	28 May 2020
6	6	"Episode 1.6"	43 min	4 June 2020
7	7	"Episode 1.7"	40 min	11 June 2020

=== Season 2 ===
No. overall	No. in season	Title	Duration	Original release date
8	1	"Episode 2.1"	44 min	11 May 2021
9	2	"Episode 2.2"	43 min	18 May 2021
10	3	"Episode 2.3"	43 min	25 May 2021
11	4	"Episode 2.4"	43 min	1 June 2021
12	5	"Episode 2.5"	44 min	8 June 2021
13	6	"Episode 2.6"	44 min	15 June 2021
14	7	"Episode 2.7"	44 min	22 June 2021

=== Season 3 ===
No. overall	No. in season	Title	Duration	Original release date
15	1	"Episode 3.1"	TBA	2 September 2022
16	2	"Episode 3.2"	46 min	9 September 2022
17	3	"Episode 3.3"	46 min	16 September 2022
18	4	"Episode 3.4"	44 min	23 September 2022
19	5	"Episode 3.5"	45 min	30 September 2022
20	6	"Episode 3.6"	41 min	7 October 2022
21	7	"Episode 3.7"	42 min	14 October 2022

=== Season 4 ===
No. overall	No. in season	Title	Duration	Original release date
22	1	"Episode 4.1"	TBA	4 October 2024
23	2	"Episode 4.2"	TBA	11 October 2024
24	3	"Episode 4.3"	TBA	18 October 2024
25	4	"Episode 4.4"	TBA	25 October 2024
26	5	"Episode 4.5"	TBA	1 November 2024
27	6	"Episode 4.6"	TBA	8 November 2024
28	7	"Episode 4.7"	TBA	15 November 2024

== Production ==
Filming for the first season began in October 2019. It was filmed on location in Opole and Srebrna Góra.

In 2023, it was announced that the series would be renewed for a fourth season.
