= Paweł Maślona =

Polish filmmaker (born 1983)

- Maślona in 2025
- Born: 1983 (age 42–43); Kędzierzyn-Koźle, Poland
- Education: Jagiellonian University; Krzysztof Kieślowski Film School
- Occupations: Director; screenwriter
- Years active: 2010–present

Paweł Maślona (born 1983) is a Polish film director and screenwriter. He is best known for directing the film Scarborn (2023), which earned him the Polish Academy Award for Best Director, and for directing and co-writing the television miniseries The Doll (2026).

== Early life ==
Maślona was born in Kędzierzyn-Koźle. His father, who is a cousin of fellow Polish film director Bartosz M. Kowalski, founded a company after the fall of the Polish People's Republic. He grew up wanting to be a filmmaker, but was initially hesitant to apply to film school after high school. He first earned a degree in political science from the Jagiellonian University before completing a degree in directing from the Krzysztof Kieślowski Film School.

== Career ==
Maślona worked as Marcin Wrona's assistant on The Christening (2010); the two later co-wrote the film Demon (2015), which Wrona directed. Maślona also directed several short films before his feature directorial debut, Panic Attack (2017).

Maślona later directed the film Scarborn (2023), which earned him the Polish Film Award for Best Director.

== Filmography ==
=== Film ===
Year	Title	Director	Screenplay	Notes	Ref.
2010	The Christening	Assistant	No		
2010	Eclipse	Yes	Yes	Short film	
2013	Magma	Yes	Yes	Short film	
2015	Demon	No	Yes	Co-written with Marcin Wrona	
2017	Panic Attack	Yes	Yes	Co-written with Bartłomiej Kotschedoff and Aleksandra Pisula	
2023	Scarborn	Yes	No		
2024	Night Silence	No	Yes	Co-written with Bartosz M. Kowalski and Mirella Zaradkiewicz	

=== Television ===
Year	Title	Director	Screenplay	Notes	Ref.
2015	Mąż czy nie mąż	Yes	No	13 episodes	
2019–2020	Motyw	Yes	No	10 episodes	
2021	Pisarze: Serial na krótko	Yes	No	9 episodes; co-directed with Mikołaj Lizut	
2021	The Mire	No	Yes	6 episodes; co-written with Kasper Bajon and Jan Holoubek	
2026	The Doll	Yes	Yes	6 episodes; co-written with Paweł Demirski and Jagoda Dutkiewicz	

== Awards and nominations ==
Award	Year	Category	Nominated work	Result	Ref.
Polish Film Awards	2024	Best Director	Scarborn	Won	
