= The Peasants (2023 film) =

- Theatrical release poster
- Chłopi
- Directed by: DK Welchman; Hugh Welchman
- Screenplay by: DK Welchman; Hugh Welchman
- Based on: The Peasants by Władysław Reymont
- Produced by: Hugh Welchman; Sean M. Bobbitt
- Starring: Kamila Urzędowska; Robert Gulaczyk; Mirosław Baka; Sonia Mietielica; Ewa Kasprzyk; Cyprian Grabowski; Cezary Łukaszewicz; Małgorzata Kożuchowska; Sonia Bohosiewicz; Dorota Stalińska; Andrzej Konopka; Mateusz Rusin; Maciej Musiał
- Cinematography: Radosław Ładczuk; Kamil Polak; Szymon Kuriata
- Edited by: DK Welchman; Patrycja Piróg; Miki Węcel
- Music by: Łukasz "L.U.C." Rostkowski
- Production companies: BreakThru Films; DigitalKraft; Art Shot
- Distributed by: Next Film (Poland); MegaCom Film (Serbia); Kino Pavasaris Distribution (Lithuania)
- Release dates: 8 September 2023 (TIFF); 13 October 2023 (Poland)
- Running time: 115 minutes
- Countries: Poland; Ukraine; Serbia; Lithuania
- Language: Polish
- Box office: $10 million

The Peasants (

Polish: Chłopi) is a 2023 Polish-language adult animated historical drama film directed and written by DK Welchman and Hugh Welchman. An adaptation of Władysław Reymont's novel of the same name, the film was produced using the painted animation technique similar to the pair's previous film, Loving Vincent. The film stars an ensemble cast featuring Kamila Urzędowska, Robert Gulaczyk, Mirosław Baka, Sonia Mietielica, Ewa Kasprzyk, Cezary Łukaszewicz, Małgorzata Kożuchowska, Sonia Bohosiewicz, Dorota Stalińska, Andrzej Konopka, Mateusz Rusin and Maciej Musiał.

The Peasants had its world premiere at the Toronto International Film Festival before being theatrically released in Poland on 13 October 2023. The film received mixed reviews from critics.

== Plot ==
The film, like Reymont's novel, is divided into four parts corresponding to each of the four seasons. It takes place at the turn of the twentieth century, over the course of one year, in the village of Lipce.

=== Autumn ===
In the village of Lipce lives a beautiful young peasant woman named Jagna Paczesiówna, who is talented in making cutouts. Jagna is having an affair with Antek Boryna, the son of Maciej Boryna, the richest farmer in the village. However, Antek himself is married, his wife, Hanka, having a hard time accepting her husband's adultery. In addition, the elder Boryna, who is a widower wanting to remarry, decides to marry Jagna and give her six acres of land as a dowry, a deal that pleases her mother, Dominikowa, but is opposed by Antek and Hanka. After a fight with Antek, Boryna orders his son as well as his daughter-in-law and three grandchildren to leave his farm. Antek and his family then move to live with his father-in-law, living an impoverished life. Boryna and Jagna soon have a lavish wedding which Antek and Hanka do not attend.

=== Winter ===
Despite being married to Boryna, Jagna resumes having an affair with the exiled Antek. Boryna repeatedly catches his wife with his son. In addition, Boryna is troubled by the decision of the landowners' court to cut down forests belonging to the peasants. He gathers men from the village to take revenge on the landowners. During the fierce fight with the landowners' emissaries, Boryna is seriously injured, for which Antek takes brutal revenge. The fights are interrupted by the intrusion of Russian troops, who arrest many peasants from Lipce, including Antek.

=== Spring ===
Since the day of the fight, Hanka has been running Boryna's farm, insulting Jagna whenever she could. Jagna herself is increasingly isolated by her neighbors, who blame her for the misfortune upon the village. Boryna, lying wounded in bed, secretly informs his daughter-in-law where to find his hidden stash of money, which she then spends on food for her children. Meanwhile, Jagna gets an offer from the mayor to bail Antek out of jail. However, the mayor takes advantage of the situation, getting her drunk and unsuccessfully attempting to rape her. One day, Boryna instinctively gets out of bed to sow his field, but collapses and dies while doing so. After Boryna is laid to rest, Antek is set free and returns home to Hanka's delight and takes over his father's farm. After spotting Jagna at their favorite spot, he attempts to reconcile and rekindle their relationship, but the embittered Jagna rebuffs him and Antek rapes her.

=== Summer ===
A drought hits Lipce, resulting in a poor harvest. Having moved back to her childhood home, Jagna rejects the offer to marry a carpenter named Mateusz. Antek is now Lipce's most influentual person, while Hanka goes on a pilgrimage with their youngest child. One night, the villagers gather at an inn to discuss the matter on Jagna; they are outraged when the mayor's wife says that her husband has spent money from the treasury to buy Jagna gifts, while the organist's wife claims that Boryna's widow has even attempted to seduce her son–an ordained priest named Jasio. Believing that Jagna's promiscuity has brought God's wrath on Lipce, the villagers elect to banish her, a punishment that Antek allows them to carry out. The next day, the peasants form an angry mob and march to Dominikowa's house. Mateusz, Dominikowa, and a family friend named Jagustynka attempt to protect Jagna, but the angry villagers knock them unconscious. The peasants then seize Jagna, dragging her outside, beating her, stripping her naked, and taking her on a cart to the edge of the village. There, they insult and throw mud at her, leaving her naked in the rain. Jasio's mother warns Jagna to never return to the village or they will set their dogs on her. After some time, the humiliated Jagna gets up, lets the rain wash the mud off her, and marches out into the world.

== Cast ==
- Kamila Urzędowska as Jagna, the main protagonist of the film.
- Robert Gulaczyk as Antek Boryna, Maciej Boryna's estranged son and Jagna's lover.
- Mirosław Baka as Maciej Boryna, the patriarch of the Boryna family, the richest farmer in the village, and Jagna's husband.
- Sonia Mietielica as Hanka Borynowa, Antek's wife.
- Ewa Kasprzyk as Dominikowa, Jagna's mother.
- Cyprian Grabowski as Witek
- Cezary Łukaszewicz as Michał, Hanka's brother, Boryna's son-in-law, and a blacksmith.
- Małgorzata Kożuchowska as The Organist's Wife
- Sonia Bohosiewicz as The Mayor's Wife
- Dorota Stalińska as Jagustynka, a family friend of Jagna and Dominikowa's.
- Andrzej Konopka as The Mayor
- Mateusz Rusin as Mateusz, the carpenter.
- Maciej Musiał as Jasio, the organist's son and a priest.

== Production ==
The film was produced using the painted animation technique over the production of five years, similar to the Welchman duo's previous film, Loving Vincent. Initially the film was shot with the actors, and then more than a hundred painters in four studios in Poland, Lithuania, Ukraine, and Serbia painted oil paintings based on the shots, which became frames in the film. Animators then worked to supplement the paintings to make the whole film seamless. The artists spent over 200,000 hours in total working on the project.

The film features works from the turn of the 19th and 20th centuries, with an emphasis on Young Poland artists. It includes interpretations of works by artists such as Józef Chełmoński, Ferdynand Ruszczyc and Leon Wyczółkowski. Józef Chełmoński's works that are alluded to in the film include the following:

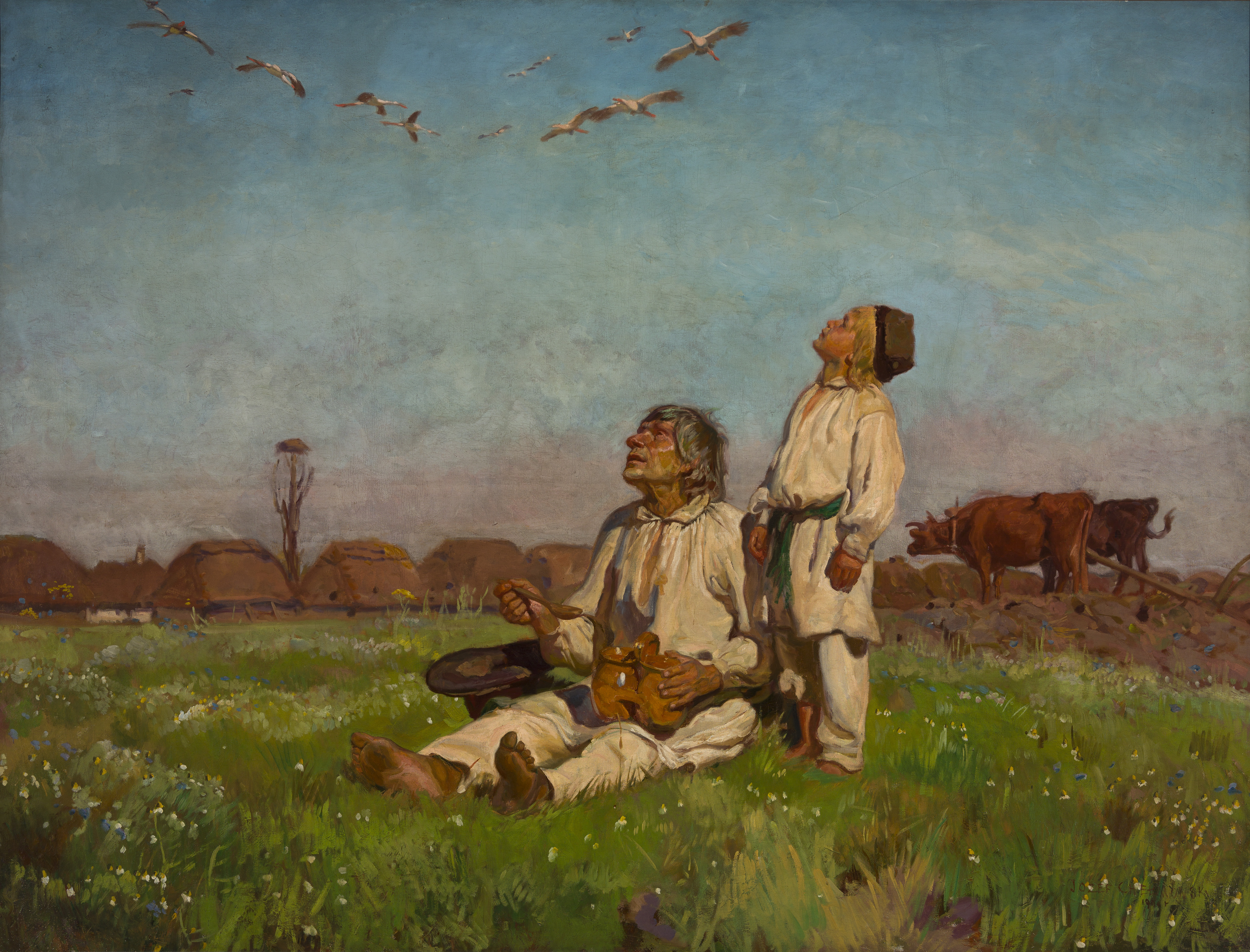
Bociany (Storks)

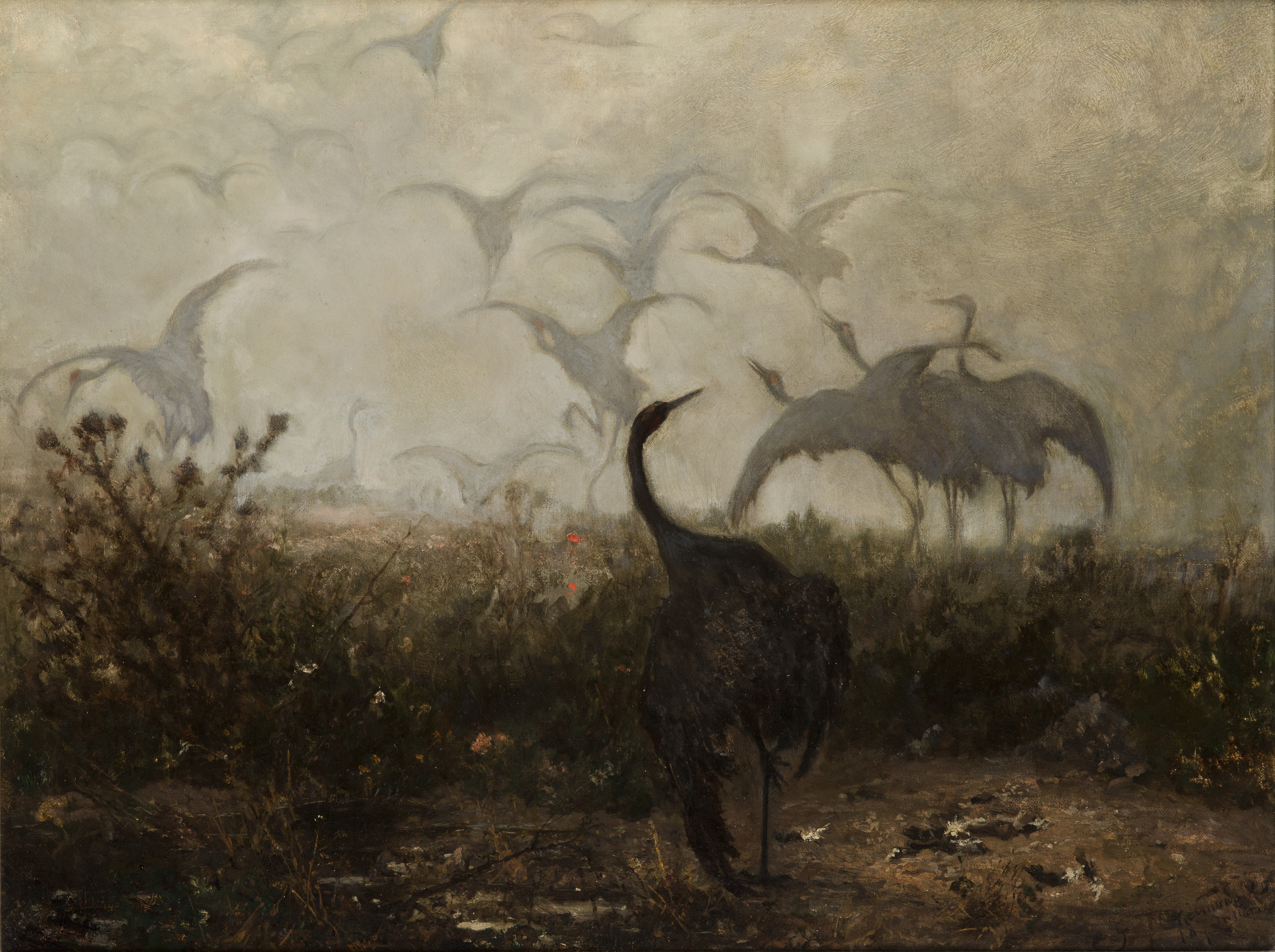
Żurawie (Cranes)

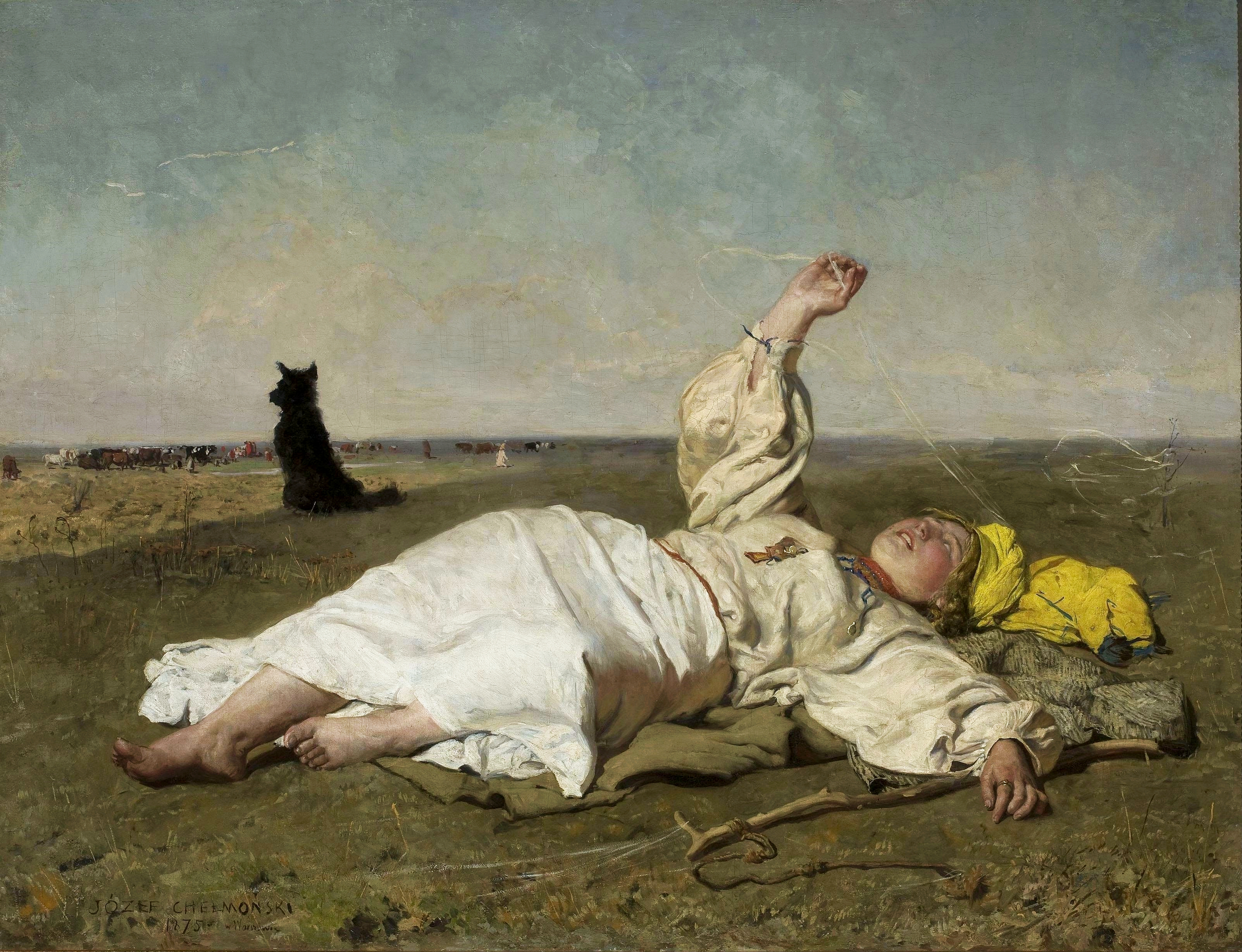
Babie lato (Indian Summer)

The film is a co-production by BreakThru Films in Poland, Art Shot in Lithuania, and Digitalkraft in Serbia.

=== Music ===
The score is by Łukasz Rostkowski (aka "L.U.C"), a Polish MC, rapper, activist, and music producer based in Wrocław. As founder of the international Rebel Babel Ensemble (aka Rebel Babel Film Orchestra), he has created a "Multimedia concert" with Rebel Babel for the film. The score was released on 3 November 2023.

Singer-songwriter Katie Melua features on an English-language version of the track, "End of Summer", which features in the closing of the film's soundtrack. The single was released on 26 January 2024.

=== Impact of 2022 Russian invasion of Ukraine ===
When the MOREFILM animation studio in Kyiv, which was run by two producers Olga Zhurzhenko and Desniana Rozhkova, was closed down overnight in February 2022, after the Russian invasion of Ukraine, the film's producers launched a rapid response to help the Ukrainian artists and their families, moving as many as possible to Poland to continue working. As not all Ukrainian artists were able to leave, in August 2022 BreakThru Films helped to relaunch the MOREFILM animation studio in Kyiv, providing work for fifteen painters and staff.

From October 2022, another wave of bombings and associated power cuts began in Ukraine. However, the painters wanted to continue to create, and arranged their schedule to the rhythm of the power cuts, waiting in the cold when that electricity was out. In late autumn, BreakThru Films launched a campaign on a crowdfunding website to urgently raise funds to purchase a power generator that would restore the artists' ability to work.

== Release ==
The world premiere took place at the Toronto International Film Festival on 8 September 2023, in the Special Presentations section. It was also invited at the 28th Busan International Film Festival in 'Flash Forward' section and was screened on 8 October 2023.

The film was released in Polish cinemas on 13 October 2023 by distributor Next Film.

As of July 2023, the film had been sold to over 40 countries. In September 2023, Sony Pictures Classics acquired distribution rights to the film for North and Latin America, the Middle East, Australia and New Zealand.

In United States, it was released for a one-week awards-qualifying run beginning 8 December 2023 in New York City and Los Angeles, followed by a limited theatrical release starting on 26 January 2024.

== Reception ==
On the review aggregator website Rotten Tomatoes, the film holds an approval rating of 62% based on 65 reviews, with an average rating of 6.3/10. The critical consensus reads: "The Peasants is a tremendous visual achievement, although the story may be disappointingly conventional in comparison." Metacritic, which uses a weighted average, assigned the film a score of 61 out of 100, based on 17 critics, indicating "generally favorable" reviews.

Writing for The Observer, Wendy Ide praised the film for "its grimly relentless approach to misogyny and sexual violence" and called it "a disconcertingly beautiful picture about the ugliness of humanity."

In Poland, according to the review aggregator Mediakrytyk, the film was "very positively reviewed and acclaimed by critics", based on an average rating of 8.1 from 51 critic reviews.

=== Box office in Poland ===
With over 141,000 admissions The Peasants recorded the biggest opening weekend for a Polish film in 2023, dethroning Agnieszka Holland's Green Border. After 12 days of release, the distributor Next Film has reported that the number of admissions passed 500,000. By 30 October 2023 the number of recorded admissions rose to above 750,000 making the movie the most popular Polish release of 2023. On 6 November 2023 the distributor informed that the movie has reached above 1 million admissions in Polish cinemas.

=== Accolades ===
Award or film festival	Date of ceremony	Category	Recipient(s)	Result	Ref.
Polish Film Festival	23 September 2023	Best Film	The Peasants	Nominated	
Polish Film Festival	23 September 2023	Special Jury Prize	The Peasants	Won	
Polish Film Festival	23 September 2023	Audience Award	The Peasants	Won	
Polish Film Festival	23 September 2023	Crystal Star Elle Award	Kamila Urzędowska	Won	
Polish Film Festival	23 September 2023	Chopard Loves Cinema - Chopard & W. Kruk Award	Kamila Urzędowska	Won	
Busan International Film Festival	13 October 2023	Flash Forward Award	The Peasants	Nominated	
Valladolid International Film Festival	28 October 2023	Alquimias Award	The Peasants	Nominated	
Tallinn Black Nights Film Festival	19 November 2023	Best Baltic Film	The Peasants	Pending	
Boston Society of Film Critics Awards	10 December 2023	Best Animated Film	The Peasants	Runner-up (Note: Shared with Teenage Mutant Ninja Turtles: Mutant Mayhem, Spider-Man: Across the Spider-Verse and Robot Dreams.)	

== See also ==
- List of submissions to the 96th Academy Awards for Best Foreign Language Film
- List of Polish submissions for the Academy Award for Best International Feature Film
