= Anna Ilczuk =

Polish actress (born 1981)

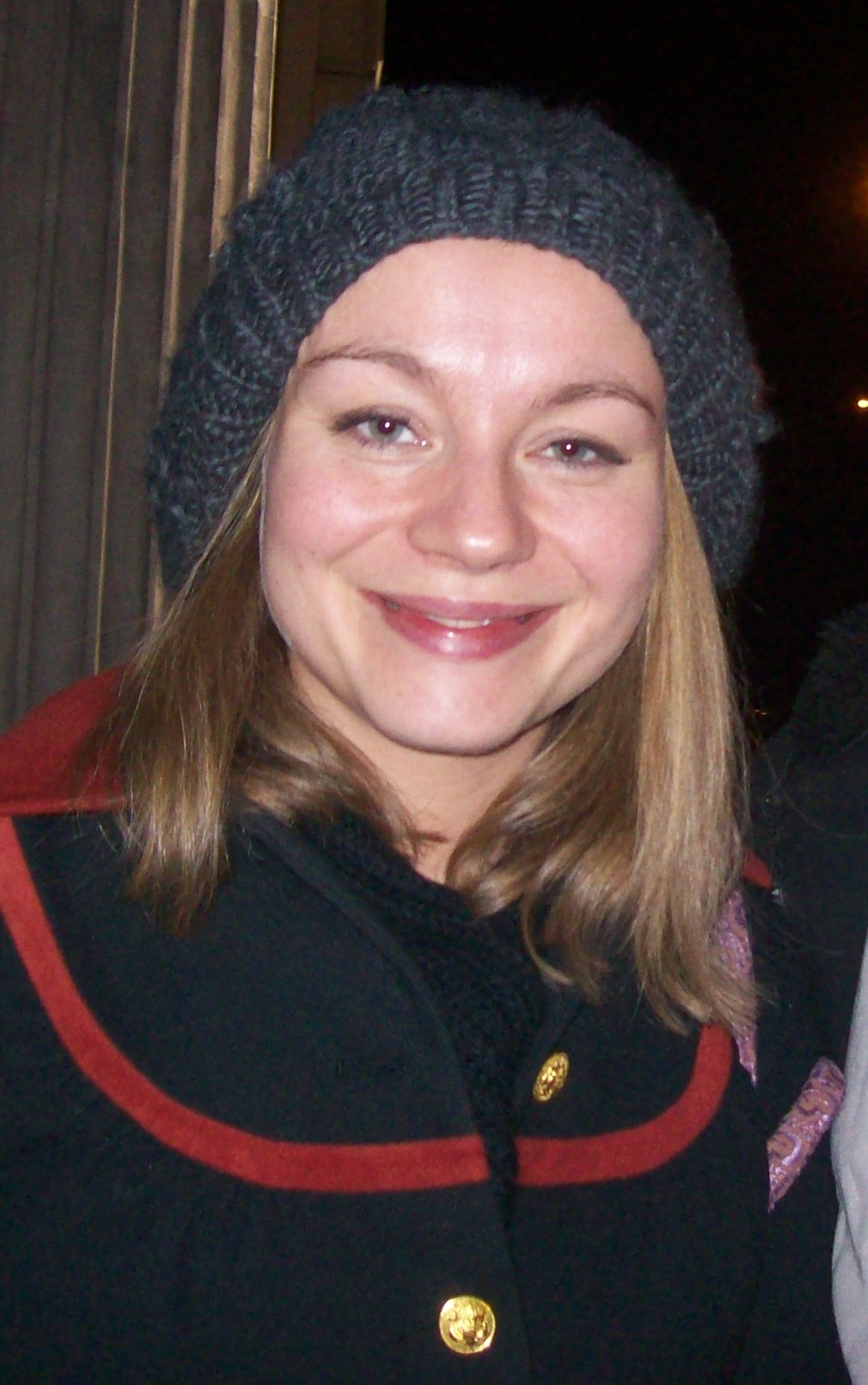
- Anna Ilczuk
- Born: August 21, 1981 (age 44); Wrocław, Poland
- Occupation: Actress
- Years active: 1993–present

Anna Ilczuk (born 21 August 1981 in Wrocław, Poland) is a Polish film, television and theater actress, best known for playing in the Polish TV series Pierwsza miłość (First Love).

== Selected filmography ==
- 2004: O czym są moje oczy as Anna
- 2004–present: Pierwsza miłość (First Love) as Emilia Śmiałek
- 2005: Droga Molly (Molly's Way) as Wioletta
- 2005–2006: Warto kochać as Andżela
- 2009: Rajskie klimaty as Andżela
- 2011: 80 milionów as Mrs. Ola
- 2011: Daas as Joanna
- 2011: Sala samobójców as Ada
- 2011–present: Świat według Kiepskich (The World According to the Kiepskis) as Jolanta Pupcia-Kiepska
- 2011: Z miłości as Joanna
- 2016: Artyści actress Anna Malarska “Wrażliwa”
- 2020: Angel of Death as Lila Pelc

== Theatre directing ==
In 2020, Ilczuk directed and wrote the stage adaptation of Ronja, the Robber's Daughter, based on the novel by Astrid Lindgren, at the Powszechny Theatre, Warsaw. The production premiered on 18 September 2020.

== Awards ==
- 2011: Odznaka honorowa „Zasłużony dla Kultury Polskiej” (Badge of Honor "Merit for Polish Culture)
