= Bartkowiak (film) =

- Directed by: Daniel Markowicz
- Written by: Daniel Bernardi
- Starring: Szymon Bobrowski; Janusz Chabior; Zofia Domalik
- Production company: Lightcraft
- Release date: July 28, 2021
- Running time: 91 minutes
- Country: Poland
- Language: Polish

Bartkowiak is a 2021 Polish film directed by Daniel Markowicz, written by Australian screenwriter Daniel Bernardi and starring Szymon Bobrowski, Janusz Chabior and Zofia Domalik.

== Synopsis ==
Tomek, an MMA fighter, decides to retire from the sport after a significant defeat. He chooses to leave his past behind by severing all ties with the sports world and seeking refuge far away from everyone in a mountain village. However, he will soon uncover that his brother's death was not merely an accident.

== Cast ==
- Szymon Bobrowski
- Janusz Chabior
- Zofia Domalik
- Jan Frycz
- Joanna Kocyla
- Cezary Lukaszewicz
- Damian Majewski
- Margo Marlow as VIP Guest
- Antoni Pawlicki
- Józef Pawlowski as Tomek Bartkowiak
- Danuta Stenka
- Bartlomiej Topa
- Rafal Zawierucha as Steppy D
