= Natalia Osińska =

Polish writer

Natalia Osińska is a Polish writer of young adult literature. Her novels describe the lives of Polish LGBTQ youth.

Osińska graduated from the Faculty of Polish and Classical Philology at the Adam Mickiewicz University in Poznań, Poland. Her literary debut was the novel Fanfik, about a transgender teenager named Tosiek Graczyk, which was listed on the 2016 List of Treasures by the Museum of Children's Books in Poland. The sequels, published in 2017 and 2019, are titled Slash and Fluff.

Fanfic, a Netflix film adaptation of Osińska's novel directed by Marta Karwowska and starring Alin Szewczyk as Tosiek, premiered in 2023.

== Works ==
- Fanfik (Krytyka Polityczna 2016)
- Slash (Agora 2017)
- Fluff (Agora 2019)
