= Sole (film) =

2019 film

- Directed by: Carlo Sironi
- Screenplay by: Carlo Sironi
- Produced by: Giovanni Pompili; Agnieszka Wasiak
- Starring: Sandra Drzymalska
- Cinematography: Gergely Poharnok
- Edited by: Andrea Maguolo
- Music by: Teoniki Rożynek
- Release date: 2019
- Language: Italian

Sole (Sun) is a 2019 Italian-Polish drama film co-written and directed by Carlo Sironi, at his feature film debut. It premiered at the 76th Venice International Film Festival, and won the European Film Award for European Discovery of the Year at the 33rd European Film Awards.

== Cast ==
- Sandra Drzymalska as Lena
- Claudio Segaluscio as Ermanno
- Barbara Ronchi as Bianca
- Bruno Buzzi as Fabio
- Vitaliano Trevisan as Obstetrician
- Marco Felli as Giordano

== Production ==
The film is a co-production between Italian company Kino Produzioni and Polish company Lava Films, in collaboration with Rai Cinema.

== Release ==
The film premiered at the 76th edition of the Venice Film Festival, in the Orizzonti sidebar, and was also screened at the 44th Toronto International Film Festival, in the discovery section.

== Reception ==
On the review aggregator website Rotten Tomatoes, 100% of 10 critics' reviews are positive, with an average rating of 7.00/10. The film won the European Film Award for European Discovery of the Year at the 33rd European Film Awards.
