= Monika Strzępka =

Polish theatre and film director (born 1976)

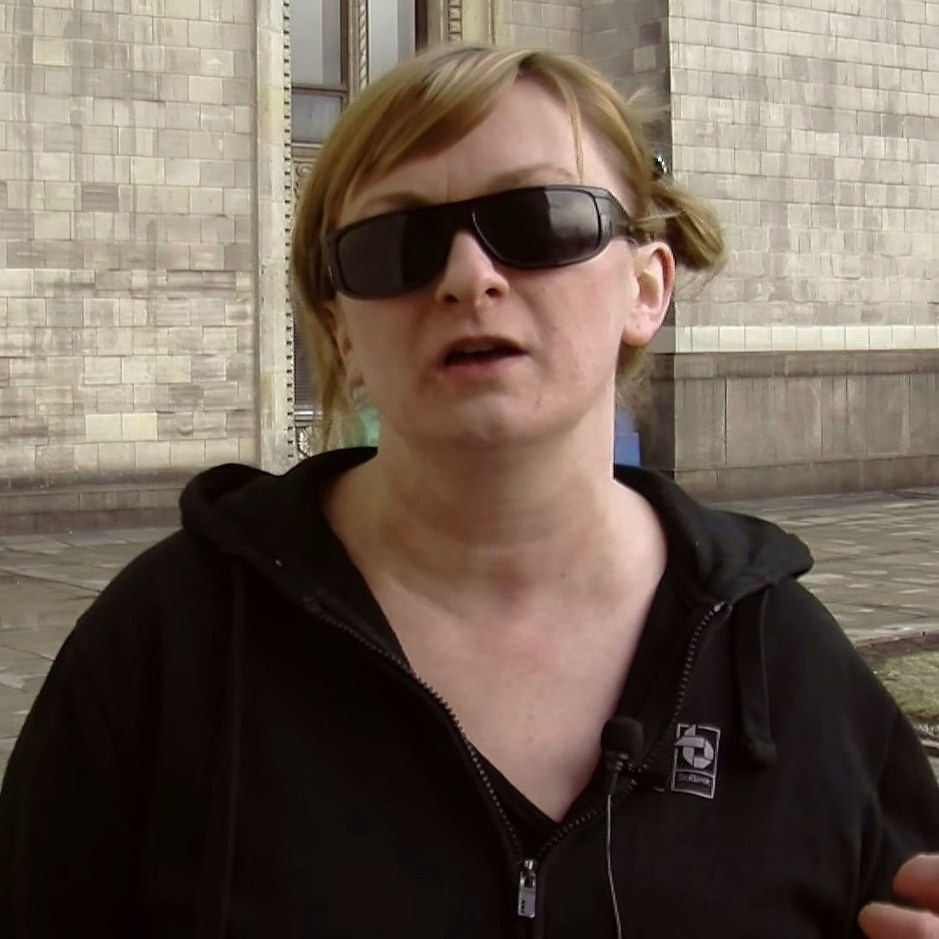
- Monika Strzępka, 2012
- Born: 7 August 1976 (age 49)
- Occupations: theatre director, film director

Monika Strzępka (born 7 August 1976) is a theatre director and film director.

== Biography ==
She studied for three years at the Aleksander Zelwerowicz National Academy of Dramatic Art. Playwright Paweł Demirski became her frequent collaborator. Between 2022 and 2024 she was the director of the Dramatic Theatre in Warsaw.

== Theatre plays (direction) ==
- 2004: Z twarzą przy ścianie (Polish Theatre, Bydgoszcz)
- 2005: Szeks show presents Yorick, czyli spowiedź błazna (Teatr Wybrzeże)
- 2005: Honor samuraja (Cyprian Kamil Norwid Theatre in Jelenia Góra)
- 2006: Prezydentki (Scena Polska Czeski Cieszyn)
- 2007: Dziady. Ekshumacja (Wrocław Polish Theatre)
- 2007: Był sobie Polak Polak Polak i diabeł czyli w heroicznych walkach narodu polskiego wszystkie sztachety zostały zużyte (Jerzy Szaniawski Dramatic Theatre in Wałbrzych)
- 2007: Śmierć podatnika (Wrocław Polish Theatre)
- 2008: Opera gospodarcza dla ładnych pań i zamożnych panów (Jan Kochanowski Dramatic Theatre in Opole)
- 2009: Sztuka dla dziecka (Cyprian Kamil Norwid Theatre in Jelenia Góra)
- 2010: Był sobie Andrzej Andrzej Andrzej i Andrzej (Jerzy Szaniawski Dramatic Theatre in Wałbrzych)
- 2011: Tęczowa Trybuna 2012 (Wrocław Polish Theatre)
- 2011: W imię Jakuba S. (Dramatic Theatre in Warsaw)
- 2012: Firma (New Theatre in Poznań)
- 2013: Bitwa warszawska 1920 (Helena Modrzejewska National Old Theatre)
- 2014: Klątwa. Odcinki z czasu beznadziei (episodes 1–3, coproduction of Imka Theatre and Łaźnia Nowa Theatre)
- 2015: nie-boska komedia. Wszystko powiem Bogu! (Helena Modrzejewska National Old Theatre)
- 2016: Triumf woli (Helena Modrzejewska National Old Theatre)
- 2018: Rok z życia codziennego w Europie Środkowo-Wschodniej (Helena Modrzejewska National Old Theatre)
- 2020: Jeńczyna (Helena Modrzejewska National Old Theatre)
- 2021: M.G. (Polish Theatre, Warsaw)

== Filmography ==
- 2016: Artyści (TV series) – directed by
- 2025: Zaprawdę Hitler umarł – directed by

Source.

== Accolades ==
In 2010 she received Paszport Polityki.
