= Aleksandra Skraba =

Polish actress (born 1995)

- Born: 29 April 1995 (age 31); Nowa Ruda, Lower Silesian Voivodeship, Poland
- Education: Łódź Film School
- Occupation: Actress
- Years active: 2019–present

Aleksandra Skraba (Polish pronunciation: [a.lɛkˈsan.dra ˈskra.ba]; born 29 April 1995) is a Polish actress.

== Biography ==
Skraba was born in Nowa Ruda and raised in Polkowice. She graduated from the Łódź Film School in 2020. The following year, starred in her first lead role in the Netflix sex comedy television series Sexify. In 2023, she wrote and starred in the play Grzybki. She joined the Adam Mickiewicz Theatre in Częstochowa in early 2025.

== Filmography ==
=== Film ===
Year	Title	Role	Ref.
2022	Orzeł. Ostatni patrol	Tosia	

=== Television ===
Year	Title	Role	Notes	Ref.
2019	Pułapka	Journalist	1 episode	
2021–present	Sexify	Natalia Dumała	Main role	
2022	Angel of Death	Natalia Barańska	Season 3	
2022	High Water	Nurse	4 episodes	
2023	1670	Arleta	2 episodes	
2024	Go Ahead, Brother	Gemboj's girlfriend	2 episodes	

=== Video games ===
Year	Title	Role	Notes	Ref.
2020	Cyberpunk 2077	Misty Olszewski	Polish version	
