= Sexify (TV series) =

Polish television series

- Genre: Sex comedy; Comedy drama
- Written by: Jakub Rużyłło
- Starring: Sandra Drzymalska; Aleksandra Skraba; Maria Sobocińska
- Music by: Radzimir Dębski
- Country of origin: Poland
- Original language: Polish
- No. of seasons: 2
- No. of episodes: 16

Production
- Running time: 37–51 minutes
- Production company: Akson Studio

Original release
- Network: Netflix
- Release: 29 April 2021 – 11 January 2023

Sexify (stylized as Sex!fy) is a Polish sex comedy television series directed by Kalina Alabrudzińska and Piotr Domalewski and starring Sandra Drzymalska, Aleksandra Skraba, and Maria Sobocińska as the lead characters. The first season of the show consisted of eight episodes, premiering on Netflix 29 April 2021. A second season of the show was released on January 11, 2023.

== Plot ==
The show follows the character of computer science student Natalia Dumała and her efforts to develop an algorithm for the female orgasm with the help of her friends Paulina and Monika. Natalia dreams of winning the competition for the best start-up at her university. With the help of her friends Paulina Malinowska and Monika Nowicka, she decides to create an app called Sexify, which aims to help people discover the world of sexuality and female orgasm.

== Cast ==
- Aleksandra Skraba as Natalia Dumała, a bright computer science student and a virgin
- Maria Sobocińska as Paulina Malinowska, a practicing Catholic from Łomża
- Sandra Drzymalska as Monika Nowicka, a student from Warsaw who enjoys casual sex
- Małgorzata Foremniak as Joanna Nowicka, Monika's mother
- Cezary Pazura as Marek Nowicki, Monika's father
- Zbigniew Zamachowski as Dean Krzysztof Maślak
- Bartosz Gelner as Konrad
- Piotr Pacek as Mariusz, Paulina's fiancé
- Jan Wieteska as Adam, Lilith's brother, sex shop worker
- Sebastian Stankiewicz as "Jabba"
- Kamil Wodka as Rafał Paluch "Kripol"
- Edyta Torhan as Natalia's mother
- Magdalena Grąziowska as Lilith, sex shop owner
- Wojciech Solarz as Krynicki, PhD
- Izabela Kuna as Malgorzata Debska
- Dobromir Dymecki as Maks Oleksiak

== Episodes ==
Series overview
Season	Episodes	Originally released
1	8	April 28, 2021
2	8	January 11, 2023

=== Season 1 (2021) ===
No. overall	No. in season	Title	Directed by	Written by	Original release date
1	1	"Episode 1"	Piotr Domalewski	Piotr Domalewski	April 28, 2021
2	2	"Episode 2"	Piotr Domalewski	Piotr Domalewski & Kalina Alabrudzińska	April 28, 2021
3	3	"Episode 3"	Piotr Domalewski	Piotr Domalewski	April 28, 2021
4	4	"Episode 4"	Piotr Domalewski	Kalina Alabrudzińska	April 28, 2021
5	5	"Episode 5"	Kalina Alabrudzińska	Kalina Alabrudzińska	April 28, 2021
6	6	"Episode 6"	Kalina Alabrudzińska	Piotr Domalewski	April 28, 2021
7	7	"Episode 7"	Kalina Alabrudzińska	Piotr Domalewski	April 28, 2021
8	8	"Episode 8"	Kalina Alabrudzińska	Piotr Domalewski & Kalina Alabrudzińska	April 28, 2021

=== Season 2 (2023) ===
No. overall	No. in season	Title	Directed by	Written by	Original release date
9	1	"Episode 1"	Kalina Alabrudzińska	Jakub Rużyłło	January 11, 2023
10	2	"Episode 2"	Kalina Alabrudzińska	Jakub Rużyłło	January 11, 2023
11	3	"Episode 3"	Kalina Alabrudzińska	Jakub Rużyłło	January 11, 2023
12	4	"Episode 4"	Kalina Alabrudzińska	Jakub Rużyłło	January 11, 2023
13	5	"Episode 5"	Kalina Alabrudzińska	Jakub Rużyłło	January 11, 2023
14	6	"Episode 6"	Kalina Alabrudzińska	Jakub Rużyłło	January 11, 2023
15	7	"Episode 7"	Kalina Alabrudzińska	Jakub Rużyłło	January 11, 2023
16	8	"Episode 8"	Kalina Alabrudzińska	Jakub Rużyłło	January 11, 2023

== Reception ==
Sexify has been described as "Poland's answer to Sex Education", a British Netflix show, due to how it addresses the topic of sexuality in an educational setting. The series has been characterised in Anglophone media as an international success, having charted in Netflix's top 10 in 80 countries.
