= Kamila Urzędowska =

Polish actress (born 1994)

- Urzędowska in 2026
- Born: 7 January 1994 (age 32); Nysa, Poland
- Education: AST National Academy of Theatre Arts (Wrocław faculty)
- Occupation: Actress
- Years active: 2018–present

Kamila Urzędowska (born 7 January 1994) is a Polish film, television and theatre actress.

== Biography ==
Urzędowska was born in Nysa, where she attended Secondary School No. 2. In 2020, she graduated from the Wrocław branch of AST National Academy of Theatre Arts.

She played minor roles, including the series Żmijowisko and popular soap opera L for Love. A breakthrough in her career came with the role of Jagna in the 2023 film The Peasants for which she was awarded the ELLE Crystal Star at the festival in Gdynia. In April 2025, she was announced as playing the role of Izabela Łęcka in an upcoming adaptation of Bolesław Prus's The Doll.

== Personal life ==
In April 2025 she announced she was in a relationship with film director Piotr Domalewski.

== Filmography ==
=== Films ===
| Year | Translated title | Original title | Role | Notes |
|---|---|---|---|---|
| 2018 | Wave '97 | Fala ‘97 | flood victim | short film |
| 2019 | How I became a gangster. True story | Jak zostałem gangsterem. Historia prawdziwa | barwoman | |
| 2020 | 25 years of innocence | 25 lat niewinności. Sprawa Tomka Komendy | Magda, Gerard's wife | based on true story of miscarriage of justice victim Tomasz Komenda |
| 2022 | Meanie | Zołza | Young Anna Sobańska | |
| 2023 | The Peasants | Chłopi | Jagna | based on the novel The Peasants |
| 2025 | So beautiful! | Przepiękne! | Julka | |
| 2025 | The Altar Boys | Ministranci | Joanna, Filip's mother | |
| 2026 | The Doll | Lalka | Izabela Łęcka | based on the novel The Doll |

=== Television ===
| Year | Translated title | Original title | Role | Type | Episode(s) |
|---|---|---|---|---|---|
| 2018 | Trace | Ślad | Jolanta Marczak | TV series | 10 |
| 2019 | Snake pit | Żmijowisko | Sabina Rybak | Streaming series | |
| 2020 | Inspector Alex | Komisarz Alex | Pola Poznańska | detective series | 171 |
| 2021 | 25 years of innocence. Tomek Komenda's case | 25 lat niewinności. Sprawa Tomka Komendy | Magda, Gerard's wife | streaming miniseries | 1–4 |
| 2021 | Father Matthew | Ojciec Mateusz | Weronika Kowalik | TV soap opera | 331 |
| 2021–2022 | L for Love | M jak miłość | Edytka | TV soap opera | 1612, 1615, 1623, 1629 |
| 2023 | My agent | Mój agent | model Gośka | TV soap opera | 9 |
| 2023 | Women murderers | Morderczynie | prisoner Adriana | streaming drama miniseries | 3–5 |
| 2023 | When's the wedding? | Kiedy ślub? | Nadia | streaming comedy miniseries | 1, 4, 6, 8 |
| 2025 | Dogs' hill | Wzgórze psów | Daria Masłowska | | |
| 2025 | The Eastern Gate | Przesmyk | Inka Nawrot | | 1–4 |
