= Zofia Domalik =

Polish actress (born 1995)

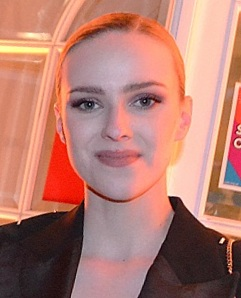
- Domalik in 2020.
- Born: 10 October 1995 (age 31)
- Education: Aleksander Zelwerowicz National Academy of Dramatic Art
- Occupation: Actress
- Years active: 2010–present
- Spouse: Paweł Kurkowski (m. 2025)
- Parents: Andrzej Domalik (father); Ewa Telega (mother)

Zofia Domalik (Polish: [ˈzɔ.fja dɔˈma.lik]; born 10 October 1995) is a Polish film, television, stage, and voice actress. She starred in the leading role of Ola in the 2019 drama film All for My Mother, and main characters of Dominika Sozoniuk in the criminal film Bartkowiak, Kasia Sobańska in the 2022 comedy film Zołza, and Ola in the 2023 romantic comedy film Kiss, Kiss!. She also starred as recurring characters such as Agata in the TVP1 drama series Plebania (2010–2011), Mirosława Buczkowska in the Polsat drama series First Love, Ewa Mazur in the Polsat drama series Zawsze warto (2019–2020), Iza Laskowska in the Polsat drama series Friends (2020), and Olga Sienkiewicz in the Polsat political satire comedy-drama Servant of the People (2023–2024). Domalik also portrayed secondary characters, such secondary characters, such as Julia Banaszek in the TVN thriller medical drama Diagnosis (2017), Zuza Rozwadowska the TVP1 war drama series Wartime Girls (2018), Agnieszka in the TVP1 historic crime series Shadow Play (2024), and Kiki in the Disney+ crime drama series The Breslau Murders (2025).

== Biography ==
Zofia Domalik was born on 10 October 1995. She is the daughter of film and theatre director and screenwriter Andrzej Domalik and actress Ewa Telega. Actor Jan Nowicki was her godparent. She finished the Jerzy Grotowski 21st General Education High School in Warsaw, Poland, and in 2019, she graduated from the Aleksander Zelwerowicz National Academy of Dramatic Art in Warsaw.

Her first television role was in 2010 and 2011, when, at the age of 15, she portrayed Agata, a recurring character in the TVP1 drama series Plebania. Later Domalik also portrayed Gizela in two episodes of the TVP2 war series Days of Honor (2011), and Mirosława Buczkowska, a recurring character in the Polsat drama series First Love (2012–2013). She also appeared in the television series True Law (2014), I'll Be Fine (2016), and Father Matthew (2018). Her first appearance in a feature film was as an extra in the 2014 war film Warsaw 44. In 2017, Domalik portrayed Julia Banaszek, a secondary character in the TVN thriller medical drama Diagnosis, and in 2018, she portrayed Zuza Rozwadowska, a secondary character in the TVP1 war drama series Wartime Girls. Between 2019 and 2020, she portrayed Ewa Mazur, a recurring character in the Polsat drama series Zawsze warto.

Domalik starred in the leading role of Ola in the 2019 drama film All for My Mother. For her performance, she was awarded at the 2019 Polish Film Festival in Gdynia for the best acting debut, the 2020 Off Camera International Festival of Independent Cinema for best best actress and best acting debut, the 2021 New York Polish Film Festival for the best actor, and the 2021 Ekran Toronto Polish Film Festival for the best female role. She was also nominated for the Polish Film Award in 2021, for the best lead actress and the best debut. She also portrayed a student, a secondary character in the 2020 drama film Overclockers. She also starred as main characters, such as Dominika Sozoniuk in the crime film Bartkowiak, Kasia Sobańska in the 2022 comedy film Zołza, and Ola in the 2023 romantic comedy film Kiss, Kiss!.

Domalik portrayed Ewa Banach, a secondary character in the Player crime series Angel of Death in 2020, and Iza Laskowska, a recurring character in the Polsat drama series Friends in 2022. She also starred as Olga Sienkiewicz, a recurring character in the Polsat political satire comedy-drama Servant of the People (2023–2024). Domalik also portrayed secondary characters of Agnieszka in the TVP1 historic crime series Shadow Play in 2024, and Kiki in the Disney+ crime drama series The Breslau Murders in 2025.

== Personal life ==
In 2025, Zofia Domalik married lawyer Paweł Kurkowski. In 2025, her husband was a contestant on the TVN reality competition show Afryka Express.

== Filmography ==
=== Films ===
Year	Title	Role	Notes
2014	Warsaw 44		Feature film
2015	Parisian Girl	Justyna	Short film
2016	Klincz	Inga	Short film
2016	Pogubienie		Short film
2017	Listy z Rosji	Rational lady-in-waiting	Television play
2017	Silence Of The Polish Lambs	Girl with a phone	Short film
2017	Time to Go	Marta Prado	Short film
2018	Fatal Attraction		Short film
2018	Urodziny psa		Short film
2019	All for My Mother	Ola	Feature film
2020	Overclockers	Student	Feature film
2021	Bartkowiak	Dominika Sozoniuk	Feature film
2021	Upał	Myszka	Television play
2022	O doglądaniu draceny	Lidia	Television play
2022	Zołza	Kasia Sobańska	Feature film
2023	Kiss, Kiss!	Ola	Feature film
2024	Księgi sprośności	Zofia Fredro	Television play

=== Television series ===
Year	Title	Role	Notes
2010–2011	Plebania	Agata	Recurring role; 27 episodes
2011	Days of Honor	Gizela	Episodes: "Nowy Świadek", "Znak Rosenfarba"
2012–2013	First Love	Mirosława Buczkowska	Recurring role
2013	Days of Honor		Episode: "Wezwanie"
2014	True Law	Frank's babysitter	Episode no. 74
2016	I'll Be Fine	Martyna Górska	Episode no. 57
2017	Diagnosis	Julia Banaszek	3 episodes
2018	Father Matthew	Krysia	Episode: "Powołanie"
2018	Wartime Girls	Zuza Rozwadowska	3 episodes
2019–2020	Zawsze warto	Ewa Mazur	Recurring role; 17 episodes
2020	Angel of Death	Ewa Banach	3 episodes
2022	Friends	Iza Laskowska	Recurring role; 8 episodes
2023	Zołza	Kasia Sobańska	MIniseries; main role; 3 episodes
2023–2024	Servant of the People	Olga Sienkiewicz	Recurring role; 33 episodes
2024	Shadow Play	Agnieszka	3 episodes
2025	The Breslau Murders	Kiki	2 episodes

=== Polish-language dubbing ===
Year	Title	Role	Notes
2017	Cloudy with a Chance of Meatballs	Jo	Television series; episode: "Out to FLUNCH"
2017	Disney 11	Lara	Television series; recurring role; 60 episodes
2017	Puppy Dog Pals	Additional voices	Television series
2018	101 Dalmatian Street	Big Fee	Television series; recurring role; 17 episodes
2018	Craig of the Creek	Katie	Television series; episode: "Vulture's Nest"
2018	Craig of the Creek	Yustice	Television series; recurring role; 6 episodes
2018	Freaky Friday	Ellie Blake	Feature film
2018	Patrick	Becky	Feature film
2018	Rapunzel's Tangled Adventure	Elderly woman	Television series; episode: "Vigor the Visionary"
2019	Spider-Man: Far From Home	Seamstress	Feature film

== Accolades ==
Accolades received by Zofia Domalik
Year	Award	Category	Nominated work	Result	Ref.
2019	Polish Film Festival	Actor debut	All for My Mother	Won	
2020	Polish Feature Film Competition Award	Best actress	All for My Mother	Won	
2020	Rising Star Award	Best acting debut	All for My Mother	Won	
2021	Polish Film Award	Best lead female role	All for My Mother	Nominated	
2021	Polish Film Award	Discovery of the year	All for My Mother	Nominated	
2021	Elżbieta Czyżewska Award	—N/a	All for My Mother	Won	
2021	Ekran Toronto Polish Film Festival Award	Best female role	All for My Mother	Won	
