= EO (film) =

2022 film by Jerzy Skolimowski

- Release poster
- Polish: IO
- Directed by: Jerzy Skolimowski
- Written by: Jerzy Skolimowski; Ewa Piaskowska
- Produced by: Jerzy Skolimowski; Ewa Piaskowska
- Starring: Sandra Drzymalska; Lorenzo Zurzolo; Mateusz Kościukiewicz; Isabelle Huppert
- Cinematography: Michał Dymek
- Edited by: Agnieszka Glińska
- Music by: Paweł Mykietyn
- Production companies: Skopia Film; Alien Films
- Distributed by: Gutek Film (Poland); Arthouse (Italy)
- Release dates: 19 May 2022 (Cannes); 30 September 2022 (Poland)
- Running time: 88 minutes
- Countries: Poland; Italy
- Languages: Polish; Italian; English; French
- Budget: 10.5 million zł (€2.3 million)
- Box office: $2.6 million

EO (Polish: IO) is a 2022 road drama film co-written, directed and produced by Jerzy Skolimowski. Inspired by Robert Bresson's 1966 film Au Hasard Balthazar, it follows the life of a donkey.

The film premiered in competition at the 75th Cannes Film Festival on 19 May 2022, where it won the Jury Prize, tying with The Eight Mountains. Submitted by Poland, EO was nominated for the Academy Award for Best International Feature Film at the 95th Academy Awards.

== Plot ==
EO is a donkey working for a Polish circus. He performs in an act with Kasandra, who loves and protects him. When Animal Rights activists help get the circus shut down, EO is taken away and brought to a horse stable to work. In the truck being transported, and at the stables, EO sees horses running free and being pampered. After knocking over a shelf of trophies, EO is sent to a farm, where he seems depressed and won't eat. He gives rides to children through woods, where trees are being cut down.

One night Kasandra visits him, bringing him a carrot muffin for his birthday, and telling him, "may all your dreams come true." When she leaves, EO gets through the fence and tries to follow her, getting lost. EO walks through the dark forest among various non-human life. Hunters with laser scopes begin shooting. EO observes a mortally wounded wolf. Sometime later, EO walks through an empty town, and in a store window sees tropical fish in an aquarium. He ends up at a soccer game, and his braying distracts a penalty shot, angering the losing team. The winning team takes EO with them to a local bar. That night, members of the losing team ransack the bar, and upon seeing EO, beat him nearly to death. A four-legged robot is seen struggling to successfully stand and right itself.

EO is at an animal hospital, where a janitor questions why the vet is trying to save him. Later, EO is working at a fur factory where a man shocks and kills terrified foxes. EO kicks the man in the head, possibly killing him. EO is loaded into a truck transporting horses, though he isn't on the manifest. The driver, Mateo, stops at a rest stop and gives food to a homeless, apparently undocumented migrant woman who runs away after he suggests having sex with her, supposedly joking. An unknown man with a similar appearance slits Mateo's throat. Nearby, a priest named Vito is traveling to his family home and sees EO tied to a pole, as the police investigate Mateo's murder. Vito takes EO with him. Like Kasandra, Vito talks to EO like a person, even admitting he has eaten donkey meat sausage. Vito and his stepmother, The Countess, argue about Vito's gambling then kiss. EO notices the gate into The Countess' estate has opened, and he leaves. EO walks over a stone bridge in front of a large dam, watching the water flow. Sometime later, EO is with cows being led into a slaughterhouse. The screen goes to black, followed by the sound of a captive bolt pistol being fired, indicating EO has been slaughtered.

== Cast ==
- Sandra Drzymalska as Kasandra
- Lorenzo Zurzolo as Vito
- Mateusz Kościukiewicz as Mateo
- Isabelle Huppert as the Countess
- Saverio Fabbri as Animal Trader

The donkey EO is portrayed by six donkeys: Ettore, Hola, Marietta, Mela, Rocco, and Tako.

== Production ==
EO was shot in Poland and Italy. Filming locations in Poland included the Wilanów Palace in Warsaw as well as remote villages throughout the Podkarpackie Voivodeship and Warmian-Masurian Voivodeship. In Italy, the film was shot in Rome and Sicily. Principal photography was completed by March 2022.

== Release ==
The film had its world premiere in competition at the 75th Cannes Film Festival on 19 May 2022. It had a limited theatrical release in USA by Janus Films on 18 November 2022. It was released on VOD by Criterion on 23 February 2023.

== Reception ==
=== Box office ===
EO grossed near $1.1 million in North America, and $1.3 million in other territories for a total worldwide of $2.3 million.

=== Critical response ===
On the review aggregation website Rotten Tomatoes, EO holds an approval rating of 97% based on 151 reviews from critics, with an average rating of 8.2/10. The website's consensus reads, "Bravely updating Bresson with brilliant results, EO is a donkey-driven drama that'll stubbornly stick with you long after the credits roll." On Metacritic, which uses a weighted average, the film holds a score of 85 out of 100 based on 30 reviews indicating "universal acclaim".

EO was ranked fourth on Cahiers du Cinéma's top 10 films of 2022 list. Filmmaker John Waters ranked it at number 2 on his list of the best films of 2022, calling it "[Robert] Bresson’s Au hasard Balthazar meets Old Yeller." In June 2025, IndieWire ranked the film at number 47 on its list of "The 100 Best Movies of the 2020s (So Far)."

== Accolades ==
EO was nominated for an Academy Award after being Poland's submission for the 2023 Academy Award for Best International Feature Film.

| Award | Date of ceremony | Category | Recipient(s) | Result | Ref. |
|---|---|---|---|---|---|
| Cannes Film Festival | 28 May 2022 | Palme d'Or | Jerzy Skolimowski | Nominated | |
| Cannes Film Festival | 28 May 2022 | Jury Prize | Jerzy Skolimowski | Won | |
| Cannes Film Festival | 28 May 2022 | Cannes Soundtrack Award | Paweł Mykietyn | Won | |
| Miskolc International Film Festival | 17 September 2022 | Emeric Pressburger Prize | EO | Nominated | |
| Hamptons International Film Festival | 15 October 2022 | Zelda Penzel Giving Voice to the Voiceless Award | EO | Won | |
| Montclair Film Festival | 30 October 2022 | Fiction Feature | EO | Nominated | |
| Hollywood Music in Media Awards | 16 November 2022 | Best Original Score in an Independent Film (Foreign Language) | Paweł Mykietyn | Nominated | |
| New York Film Critics Circle Awards | 2 December 2022 | Best International Film | EO | Won | |
| National Board of Review | 8 December 2022 | Top Five Foreign Language Films | EO | Won | |
| European Film Awards | 10 December 2022 | Best Director | Jerzy Skolimowski | Nominated | |
| European Film Awards | 10 December 2022 | Best Original Score | Paweł Mykietyn | Won | |
| European Film Awards | 10 December 2022 | European University Film Award | EO | Won | |
| New York Film Critics Online | 11 December 2022 | Best Foreign Language Film | EO | Won | |
| Los Angeles Film Critics Association | 11 December 2022 | Best Foreign Language Film | EO | Won | |
| Los Angeles Film Critics Association | 11 December 2022 | Best Cinematography | Michał Dymek | Won | |
| Los Angeles Film Critics Association | 11 December 2022 | Best Music/Score | Paweł Mykietyn | Runner-up | |
| Washington D.C. Area Film Critics Association | 12 December 2022 | Best International/Foreign Language Film | EO | Nominated | |
| Dallas–Fort Worth Film Critics Association | 19 December 2022 | Best Foreign Language Film | EO | 5th place | |
| Dallas–Fort Worth Film Critics Association | 19 December 2022 | Russell Smith Award | EO | Won | |
| National Society of Film Critics | 7 January 2023 | Best Foreign Language Film | EO | Won | |
| National Society of Film Critics | 7 January 2023 | Best Cinematography | Michał Dymek | Won | |
| Belgian Film Critics Association | 8 January 2023 | Grand Prix | EO | Nominated | |
| Toronto Film Critics Association | 8 January 2023 | Best International Feature Film | EO | Runner-up | |
| San Francisco Bay Area Film Critics Circle | 9 January 2023 | Best International Feature Film | EO | Nominated | |
| Austin Film Critics Association | 10 January 2023 | Best International Film | EO | Nominated | |
| Seattle Film Critics Society | 17 January 2023 | Best Film Not in the English Language | EO | Nominated | |
| Online Film Critics Society | 23 January 2023 | Best Picture | EO | 10th place | |
| Online Film Critics Society | 23 January 2023 | Best Film Not in the English Language | EO | Nominated | |
| London Film Critics' Circle | 5 February 2023 | Foreign Language Film of the Year | EO | Nominated | |
| César Awards | 24 February 2023 | Best Foreign Film | EO | Nominated | |
| Golden Reel Awards | 26 February 2023 | Outstanding Achievement in Sound Editing – Foreign Language Feature | Radosław Ochnio, Marta Weronika Werońska, Suraj Bardia | Nominated | |
| Polish Film Awards | 3 March 2023 | Best Film | EO | Won | |
| Polish Film Awards | 3 March 2023 | Best Director | Jerzy Skolimowski | Won | |
| Polish Film Awards | 3 March 2023 | Best Actress | Sandra Drzymalska | Nominated | |
| Polish Film Awards | 3 March 2023 | Best Supporting Actor | Mateusz Kościukiewicz | Nominated | |
| Polish Film Awards | 3 March 2023 | Best Screenplay | Jerzy Skolimowski, Ewa Piaskowska | Won | |
| Polish Film Awards | 3 March 2023 | Best Film Score | Paweł Mykietyn | Won | |
| Polish Film Awards | 3 March 2023 | Best Cinematography | Michał Dymek | Won | |
| Polish Film Awards | 3 March 2023 | Best Editing | Agnieszka Glińska | Won | |
| Polish Film Awards | 3 March 2023 | Best Costume Design | Katarzyna Lewińska | Nominated | |
| Polish Film Awards | 3 March 2023 | Best Production Design | Mirosław Koncewicz | Nominated | |
| Polish Film Awards | 3 March 2023 | Best Sound | Radosław Ochnio, Marcin Matlak, Marta Weronika Werońska | Nominated | |
| Academy Awards | 12 March 2023 | Best International Feature Film | Poland | Nominated | |
| Golden Trailer Awards | 29 June 2023 | Best BTS/EPK for a Feature Film (Over 2 minutes) | "Donkey" (Jump Cut) | Nominated | |
