= Alin Szewczyk =

Polish actor and model

- Born: 1999 (age 26–27); Warsaw, Poland
- Education: University of Warsaw
- Occupations: Actor; model
- Years active: 2017–present

Alin Szewczyk (born 1999) is a Polish film actor and fashion model.

== Career ==
Szewczyk debuted on screen in the 2017 film Once Upon a Time in November, but is best known for starring in the 2023 film Fanfic, based on the novel by Natalia Osińska, as the first transgender actor portraying a transgender character in a Polish film.

As a model, Szewczyk is known for being one of the first non-binary models walking in a Prada fashion show. Szewczyk has also worked for such companies as Louis Vuitton, Loewe and Valentino. In June 2023, they (Note: Szewczyk is non-binary and uses the pronouns they/he. This article uses they/them for consistency.) were featured on the cover of the Polish edition of the Elle magazine.

== Personal life ==
Szewczyk is non-binary and uses they/them and he/him pronouns in English and masculine grammatical forms in their native Polish. They are a graduate of the University of Warsaw and are also trained as a welder. As of 2023, Szewczyk resides in Eindhoven in the Netherlands.

== Filmography ==
- 2017: Once Upon a Time in November as Ola
- 2023: Fanfic as Tosiek
- 2023: We Are Perfect (documentary) as themself
