= Verily Hitler Is Dead =

- Directed by: Monika Strzępka
- Written by: Paweł Demirski
- Produced by: Jerzy Kapuściński, Ewa Jastrzębska, Magdalena Tomanek
- Cinematography: Michał Sosna
- Edited by: Michał Lejczak
- Music by: Teoniki Rożynek
- Release date: 2025
- Running time: 84 minutes
- Country: Poland
- Language: Polish

Verily Hitler Is Dead (Polish: Zaprawdę Hitler umarł) is a 2025 film directed by Monika Strzępka and written by Paweł Demirski.

== Production ==
The film was shot at the National Museum in Warsaw, the Polin Museum of the History of Polish Jews and on the Baltic coast.

== Cast ==
- Adam Sadowski as boy from the beach
- Wiktoria Gorodecka as minister of defense and memory
- Jan Peszek as Harold
- Helena Czarnik as Weronika
- Sara Strzępka-Demirska as Rudolf
- Paweł Tomaszewski as Jan, deputy commandant of the Memorial Museum
- Krzysztof Dracz as Berek
- Marcin Czarnik as Black Berek
- Dorota Pomykała as Leni Riefenstahl
- Piotr Różański as prime minister of United Europe
- Tomasz Włosok as minister of the environment, police officer, beekeeper
- Anna Kłos as Our Lady Patroness of Winners
- Marta Nieradkiewicz as journalist
- Michał Balicki as marathon boss
- Roman Gancarczyk as Bernhardt

== Release and accolades ==
The film was screened in the "Perspektywy" competition at the 50th Polish Film Festival in Gdynia in 2025. Monika Strzępka was nominated for the Krzysztof Krauze Award granted by the Polish Directors Guild for directing the film.
