= Miłogost Reczek =

Polish actor (1961–2021)

- Born: 10 February 1961; Wrocław, Poland
- Died: 14 December 2021 (aged 60)
- Education: Ludwik Solski Academy for the Dramatic Arts, Krakow
- Occupation: Actor
- Years active: 1984–2021

Miłogost Reczek (10 February 1961 – 14 December 2021) was a Polish voice actor.

== Career ==
He was known, among other roles, as the Polish dub voice for Homer Simpson in The Simpsons Movie, Felix the Cat in Baby Felix and as Vesemir and Thaler in The Witcher video games.

He dubbed various other films including Star Wars original trilogy, Despicable Me, Thomas and Friends, Monsters vs Aliens, as well as video games, like Cyberpunk 2077 and audio plays.

He played director of the Culture Department of the City Hall in the series Artyści (2016).

== Illness and death ==
Reczek died on 14 December 2021, at the age of 60. He had been diagnosed with multiple myeloma, a type of bone marrow cancer, in 2018. With his family's permission, his unfinished voice role in Cyberpunk 2077 was digitally generated by AI to complete the game.
