= Artyści =

2016 Polish television series

- Written by: Paweł Demirski
- Directed by: Monika Strzępka
- Starring: Marcin Czarnik; Adam Cywka; Miłogost Reczek; Michał Majnicz; Tomasz Nosiński
- Composer: Jan Duszyński
- Country of origin: Poland
- Original language: Polish
- No. of episodes: 8

Production
- Cinematography: Bartosz Nalazek
- Running time: 47 minutes

Original release
- Network: TVP2
- Release: 2 September 2016

Artyści is a 2016 TV series written by Paweł Demirski and directed by Monika Strzępka.

== Production ==
The series was filmed in the Palace of Culture and Science in Warsaw and in Ludowy Theatre and administrative buildings of the Sendzimir Steelworks in Nowa Huta in Kraków.

== Cast ==
- Marcin Czarnik as Marcin Konieczny, director of the theatre
- Adam Cywka as Artur Sterczyński, financial director
- Miłogost Reczek as director of the Culture Department of the City Hall
- Michał Majnicz as Jan Jaskuła
- Tomasz Nosiński as Tomasz, Konieczny's secretary
- Edward Linde-Lubaszenko as Marek Popieł, porter
- Ewa Dałkowska as Helena, the cleaning lady-medium
- Agnieszka Przepiórska as Marta Konieczna
- Agnieszka Glińska as Iwona Kamińska, accountant
- Tadeusz Huk as Marek Arabski, technical manager
- Dorota Segda as stage manager Hanna Kurczab
- Ewa Skibińska as editor Marzena Ochab
- Tomasz Karolak as actor Tomasz “Gwiazdor” Gozdyra
- Dobromir Dymecki as actor Maciej “Kredyt”
- Anna Ilczuk as actress Anna Malarska “Wrażliwa”
- Krzysztof Dracz as actor Jerzy “Nestor”
- Elżbieta Karkoszka as actress Alina “Seniorka”
- Marta Ojrzyńska as actress Joanna Szpak “Gościnna”
- Antonina Choroszy as actress Ewa Konarska “Diva”
- Klara Bielawka as actress “Młoda”
- Włodzimierz Dyła as actor Włodzimierz “Wiarus”
- Jerzy Trela as the ghost of professor Konrad Kazanowicz
- Marek Frąckowiak as the ghost of Brzeziniak
- Andrzej Kłak as Krzysztof Schiller, director
- Mikołaj Grabowski as Lech Adamek, director
- Andrzej Seweryn as firefighter

== Release ==
Two first episodes were screened at the 2016 Polish Film Festival in Gdynia. In 2021 the series premiered of Netflix.

== Reception ==
The series was met with positive reviews of the critics.
