= Fanfic (film) =

2023 film by Marta Karwowska

- Polish Netflix poster
- Polish: Fanfik
- Directed by: Marta Karwowska
- Written by: Marta Karwowska; Grzegorz Jaroszuk
- Based on: Fanfik by Natalia Osińska
- Produced by: Jerzy Dziegielewski; Paweł Heba; Maciej Sojka; Roman Szczepanik
- Starring: Alin Szewczyk; Jan Cięciara; Dobromir Dymecki
- Production company: Orphan Studio
- Distributed by: Netflix
- Release date: 17 May 2023
- Running time: 95 minutes
- Country: Poland
- Language: Polish

Fanfic (Polish: Fanfik) is a 2023 Polish drama film directed by Marta Karwowska and written by Karwowska and Grzegorz Jaroszuk. Starring Alin Szewczyk, Jan Cięciara, and Dobromir Dymecki. It is a coming-of-age LGBT-related film based on the novel of the same title by Natalia Osińska. It is notable as the first Polish film with a transgender actor, Alin Szewczyk, in the role of a transgender character. The film was released internationally on Netflix on 17 May 2023.

== Plot ==
The story is centered on the self-discovery of the protagonist, initially known as Tosia, as a 17-year-old transgender boy, assuming the name Tosiek, the love story between him and his new classmate Leon, as well as the relationship between Tosiek and his father, Marcin.

== Cast ==
- Alin Szewczyk as Tosiek
- Jan Cięciara as Leon
- Dobromir Dymecki as Marcin
- Krzysztof Oleksyn as Konrad
- Ignacy Liss as Maks
- Maja Szopa as Emilia
- Agnieszka Rajda as Roksana
- Wiktoria Kruszczyńska as Matylda
- Oskar Rybaczek as Artur
- Anna Krotoska as Jastrzębska
- Sylwia Achu as the teacher
- Marcin Perchuć as the father of Konrad
- Adam Cywka as the father of Maks
- Helena Sujecka as the grocery store clerk
- Radosław Krzyżowski as the therapist
- Ewelina Starejki as the secretary
- Anna Krotoska as Teacher Jastrzębska
- Damian Grabowski as Schoolboy
- Jakub Wróblewski as Oskar
- Stanisław Cywka as the security guard
- Mateusz Górski as Arek
- Natalia Łągiewczyk as the grocery store cashier
- Kaya Kołodziejczyk as Konrad's father's wife
- Natalia Klepacka as Kaja
- Anu Czerwinski as Konrad's father's guest
- Malwina Laska as mother of Tosiek
