= The Doll (TV series) =

2026 Polish historical drama miniseries

- Netflix poster
- Polish: Lalka
- Genre: Historical drama
- Based on: The Doll by Bolesław Prus
- Written by: Paweł Demirski; Jagoda Dutkiewicz; Paweł Maślona
- Directed by: Paweł Maślona
- Starring: Tomasz Schuchardt; Sandra Drzymalska; Jacek Braciak; Dariusz Chojnacki; Maria Kania; Piotr Pacek; Julia Wyszyńska; Monika Frajczyk; Piotr Adamczyk
- Composer: Baasch
- Country of origin: Poland
- Original language: Polish
- No. of episodes: 6

Production
- Producers: Michał Kwieciński; Jan Kwieciński
- Cinematography: Paweł Flis
- Editors: Magdalena Chowańska; Michał Czarnecki
- Running time: 60–72 minutes
- Production company: Akson Studio

Original release
- Network: Netflix
- Release: 16 September 2026

The Doll (Polish: Lalka) is a 2026 Polish historical drama television miniseries based on the novel of the same name by Bolesław Prus. It stars Tomasz Schuchardt and Sandra Drzymalska. It was released on Netflix on 16 September 2026.

On 21 September 2026, the series entered Netflix's U.S. Top 10. At the height of its popularity, The Doll appeared in Netflix's Top 10 in more than 60 countries while maintaining the top position in Poland.

== Cast ==
- Tomasz Schuchardt as Stanisław Wokulski
- Sandra Drzymalska as Izabela Łęcka
- Jacek Braciak as Tomasz Łęcki
- Dariusz Chojnacki as Ignacy Rzecki
- Maria Kania as Marianna
- Piotr Pacek as Kazimierz Starski
- Julia Wyszyńska as Florentyna
- Monika Frajczyk
- Piotr Adamczyk as Krzeszowski
- Magdalena Cielecka as Kazimiera Wąsowska
- Agnieszka Grochowska
- Mateusz Król as Julian Ochocki
- Małgorzata Hajewska-Krzysztofik as Zasławska
- Mirosław Zbrojewicz
- Andrzej Deskur
- Juliusz Chrząstowski
- Radosław Krzyżowski
- Henryk Niebudek

== Episodes ==
No.	Title	Duration	Original release date
1	"Episode 1"	70 min	16 September 2026
2	"Episode 2"	66 min	16 September 2026
3	"Episode 3"	60 min	16 September 2026
4	"Episode 4"	67 min	16 September 2026
5	"Episode 5"	65 min	16 September 2026
6	"Episode 6"	72 min	16 September 2026

== Production ==
Filming locations included Nieborów Palace in Łódź Voivodeship.

Principal photography began on 1 July 2025. That month, filming took place at Nieborów Palace and Szajnocha Street in Wrocław. In September, filming took place at the Karol Poznański Palace in Łódź. The following month, filming took place in Lublin Old Town and near the Nicolaus Copernicus Monument on Krakowskie Przedmieście in Warsaw.

== Release ==
Netflix released a first-look image from the series in January 2026. The following month, a teaser trailer was also released, featuring the song "Creep" by Radiohead. The series was released on Netflix on 16 September 2026.
