= Sandra Drzymalska =

Polish actress (born 1993)

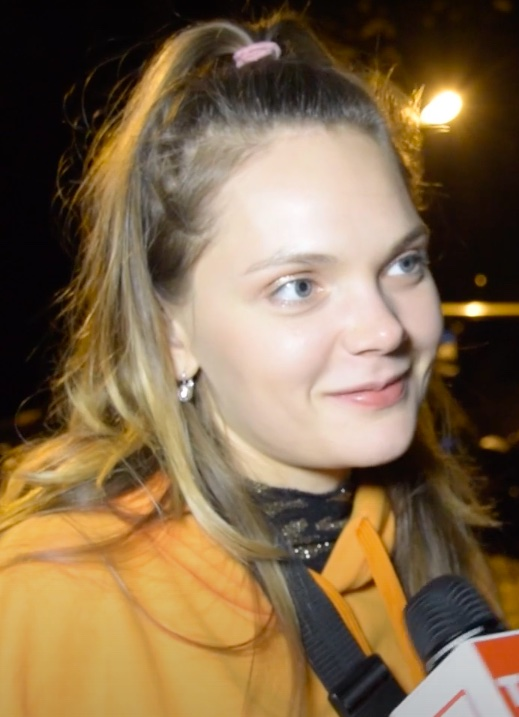
- Drzymalska in 2019
- Born: 24 July 1993 (age 33); Wejherowo, Poland
- Education: AST National Academy of Theatre Arts in Kraków
- Occupation: Actress
- Years active: 2015–present

Sandra Drzymalska (Polish: [ˈsandra dʐɨˈmalska]; born 24 July 1993) is a Polish actress.

== Career ==
She was awarded a master's degree in dramatic acting from the AST National Academy of Theatre Arts in Kraków in 2017. She played a minor role in the 2019 drama film Sole directed by Carlo Sironi. Drzymalska received Prix de l'expérimentation - Special Mention at Montréal Festival of New Cinema. Drzymalska received Special Mention for Interpretation at Bastia Italian Film Festival. Sole received European Discovery 2020 - Prix FIPRESCI at The 33rd European Film Awards.

In 2021 Drzymalska gained recognition for playing a student in the Netflix series Sexify. In October, 2021 she appeared on the cover of Vogue Polska, the Polish edition of Vogue. She played Kasandra in Jerzy Skolimowski's 2022 film EO. The film premiered in competition at the Cannes Film Festival in May 2022, where it won the Jury Prize, tying with The Eight Mountains. EO received an Oscar nomination for Best International Feature Film at the 95th Academy Awards. She received Polish Academy Award for Best Actress nomination for her performance.

In 2023, Drzymalska received Polish Academy Award for Best Supporting Actress nomination for Filip. The following year she appeared in Julia von Heinz's Treasure, and played the leading roles in films Simona Kossak and White Courage, receiving two more nominations for Polish Academy Award for Best Actress. In 2025 she starred in the Disney+ period crime drama series, The Breslau Murders, and in 2026 was cast in the Netflix historical drama, The Doll.

== Filmography ==
=== Film ===
Year	Title	Role	Notes
2017	Amok	Mary	
2019	Back Home	Urszula	
2019	Sole	Lena	
2020	Pigs 3	Sandra	
2020	Ostatni komers	Monika	Gdynia Film Festival Award Honorable Mention
2020	Everyone Has a Summer	Agata	
2021	The Getaway King	Mloda	
2022	EO	Kasandra	Nominated — Polish Academy Award for Best Actress
2022	Filip	Marlena	Nominated — Polish Academy Award for Best Supporting Actress
2022	Iluzja	Magda	
2023	Mr. Car and the Knights Templar	Anka	
2024	Treasure	Anna	
2024	Simona Kossak	Simona Kossak	Nominated — Polish Academy Award for Best Actress
2024	White Courage	Bronka	Polish Film Festival Award for Best Actress; Nominated — Polish Academy Award for Best Actress

=== Television ===
Year	Title	Role	Notes
2016	Strażacy	Nika	Episode: "Adrenalina
2016	The Teacher	Ola Kaczmarek	9 episodes
2017	Ultraviolet	Julka	Episode: "#limbo"
2019	39 and a Half	Karola	8 episodes
2019–2020	Our Century	Łucja Koszykowska	11 episodes
2020	The Woods	Klaudia Broniarek	2 episodes
2021	Angel of Death	Roma Sośnicka	5 episodes
2022	Mental	Maria Kulesza	8 episodes
2021—2023	Sexify	Monika	16 episodes
2023	BringBackAlice	Oliwia Górska	3 episodes
2025	The Breslau Murders	Lena Podolsky	8 episodes
2026	The Doll	Izabela Łęcka	6 episodes
