= Scarborn =

2023 film by Paweł Maślona

- Polish theatrical release poster
- Polish: Kos
- Directed by: Paweł Maślona
- Written by: Michał A. Zieliński
- Produced by: Leszek Bodzak; Aneta Cebula-Hickinbotham
- Starring: Bartosz Bielenia; Jacek Braciak; Robert Więckiewicz; Agnieszka Grochowska; Piotr Pacek; Jason Mitchell
- Cinematography: Piotr Sobociński Jr.
- Edited by: Piotr Kmiecik
- Music by: Mikołaj Trzaska
- Production company: Aurum Film
- Distributed by: TVP Dystrybucja Kinowa; K5 International
- Release dates: 18 September 2023 (Gdynia); 26 January 2024 (Poland)
- Running time: 120 minutes
- Countries: Poland; Sweden; Germany
- Language: Polish

Scarborn (Polish: Kos) is a 2023 historical drama film directed by Paweł Maślona. It premiered at the Polish Film Festival on 18 September 2023 and received a theatrical release in Poland on 26 January 2024.

== Premise ==
In 1794, Tadeusz Kościuszko, a veteran of the Continental Army in the American Revolutionary War, and his adjutant Jean Lapierre return to the Polish–Lithuanian Commonwealth to organize an uprising against the Russian Empire and Kingdom of Prussia.

== Cast ==
- Jacek Braciak as Tadeusz Kościuszko
- Jason Mitchell as Jean Lapierre
- Robert Więckiewicz as Dunin
- Bartosz Bielenia as Ignac Sikora
- Agnieszka Grochowska as Maria Giżyńska
- Piotr Pacek as Stanisław Duchnowski
- Andrzej Seweryn as Duchnowski
- Łukasz Simlat as Wąsowski
- Joanna Szczepkowska as Helena
- Michał Balicki as Wojtek
- Magdalena Malik as Weronka

== Production ==
The film was announced in March 2021, with Paweł Maślona directing. Filming took place over three months in Wilcza Wola, Kolbuszowa, Bulowice, and Włocławek. Filming was completed by August 2022.

== Accolades ==
| Award | Year | Category | Recipient(s) | Result | Ref. |
|---|---|---|---|---|---|
| Camerimage | 2024 | Best Polish Film | Scarborn | Won | |
| Polish Film Awards | 2024 | Best Film | Scarborn | Nominated | |
| Polish Film Awards | 2024 | Best Director | Paweł Maślona | Won | |
| Polish Film Awards | 2024 | Best Screenplay | Michał A. Zieliński | Won | |
| Polish Film Awards | 2024 | Best Actor | Bartosz Bielenia | Nominated | |
| Polish Film Awards | 2024 | Best Cinematography | Piotr Sobociński Jr. | Nominated | |
| Polish Film Awards | 2024 | Best Film Score | Mikołaj Trzaska | Nominated | |
| Polish Film Awards | 2024 | Best Supporting Actor | Jacek Braciak | Nominated | |
| Polish Film Awards | 2024 | Best Supporting Actor | Robert Więckiewicz | Nominated | |
| Polish Film Awards | 2024 | Best Supporting Actor | Piotr Pacek | Nominated | |
| Polish Film Awards | 2024 | Best Supporting Actress | Agnieszka Grochowska | Won | |
| Polish Film Awards | 2024 | Best Editing | Piotr Kmiecik | Nominated | |
| Polish Film Awards | 2024 | Best Production Design | Anna Anosowicz | Nominated | |
| Polish Film Awards | 2024 | Best Costume Design | Dorota Roqueplo | Won | |
| Polish Film Awards | 2024 | Best Makeup | Aneta Brzozowska | Won | |
| Polish Film Awards | 2024 | Best Sound | Radosław Ochnio, Adam Szlenda, Filip Krzemień | Won | |
| Polish Film Awards | 2024 | Discovery of the Year | Michał A. Zieliński | Nominated | |
