= Paweł Demirski =

Polish playwright, screenwriter, director (born 1979)

- Born: 19 July 1979 (age 47)
- Citizenship: Polish
- Occupations: Playwright, screenwriter, director

Paweł Demirski (born 19 July 1979) is a playwright, screenwriter and director who frequently collaborated with director Monika Strzępka.

== Filmography ==
- 2016: Artyści (TV series) – screenplay
- 2024: Udar (TV series) – screenplay, direction
- 2025: Zaprawdę Hitler umarł – screenplay
- 2025: An!ela (TV series) – screenplay
- 2025: W imię Jakuba S. (TV play) – direction, screenplay
- 2026: The Doll (TV series) – screenplay

== Accolades ==
In 2010 he received Paszport Polityki.
