= New Europe Market =

Annual marketing conference

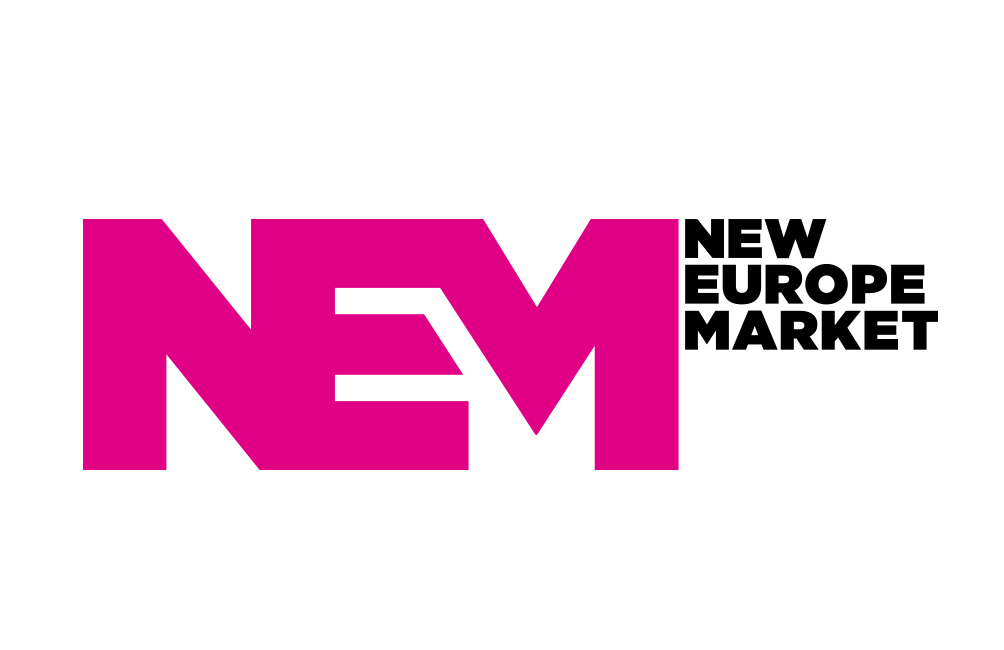
- Website type: Conference
- Founded: 2013; 13 years ago
- Headquarters: Zagreb and Dubrovnik, {{{location_country}}}
- Area served: Croatia
- Owner: Mediavision LTD.
- Website: www.neweumarket.com

New Europe Market (NEM) is an annual marketing conference, market and screenings event held in Dubrovnik, Croatia, and run by the Croatian company Mediavision Ltd. The focal idea behind the event is the creation of a platform where media, telecommunications and marketing professionals can share their knowledge and experience during the conference and networking events. The conference is addressed to FTAs, Pay-TV channels, cable operators, satellite operators, IPTV, production and distribution companies, media and marketing agencies and specialists. NEM focuses on the CEE region, but the event attendees come from all over the world.

External videos
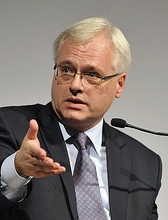
- New Europe Market (NEM) 2013: Ivo Josipovic's welcome speech

The first New Europe Market was a four-day event held in May 2013 in Dubrovnik and gathered representatives from 250 companies. The event was held under the auspices of the President of the Republic of Croatia, Ivo Josipović,. Topics of discussion ranged from “Sport migration from Public to Pay TV” to “Channel Distribution”.

In 2014 New Europe Market included, for the first time, screenings and production workshops. During the conference HBO Adria revealed a replica of the Iron Throne, from Game of Thrones, which was a very popular tourist attraction in Dubrovnik, where Game Of Thrones was partly filmed,. Discussions during the NEM concerned topics like trends in global promotion of local content or developments of cloud technology

The third edition of New Europe Market introduced discussions on the economic challenges in the CEE region for the media industry, new TV metrics and the future of second screen. NEM 2015 again hosted screenings, as well as a production panel with guests like Tom Fontana and Nigel McCrery. For the first time NEM also hosted a session featuring a TV star, with Tim Daly of Madam Secretary taking stage for a keynote interview,.

The 4th edition of NEM brought together more than 300 companies and 1000+ participants from all over the world that took part in 10 panel discussions, two presentations and countless networking opportunities. NEM 2016 was marked by the global premiere of the series The Paper, keynote speech from Christoph Mainusch, co-CEO of Central European Media Enterprises and executive director and & CEO of Nova Group, Vice`s announcement of expansion in the region, Podravka`s presentation of its new series Croatia’s Finest with MasterChef winner Dhruv Baker as well as the released information about a new partnership Ginx has finalized with Sky and ITV involving the launch of the first UK 24-hour eSport Channel.

NEM staff includes 12 young people (changing every year), students of journalism, media, production etc., who gain knowledge and experience from working in their related branches. In this way NEM strengthens ties and connections between academic and business sectors whilst also developing new ideas and standards.
