= Paweł Edelman =

Polish cinematographer

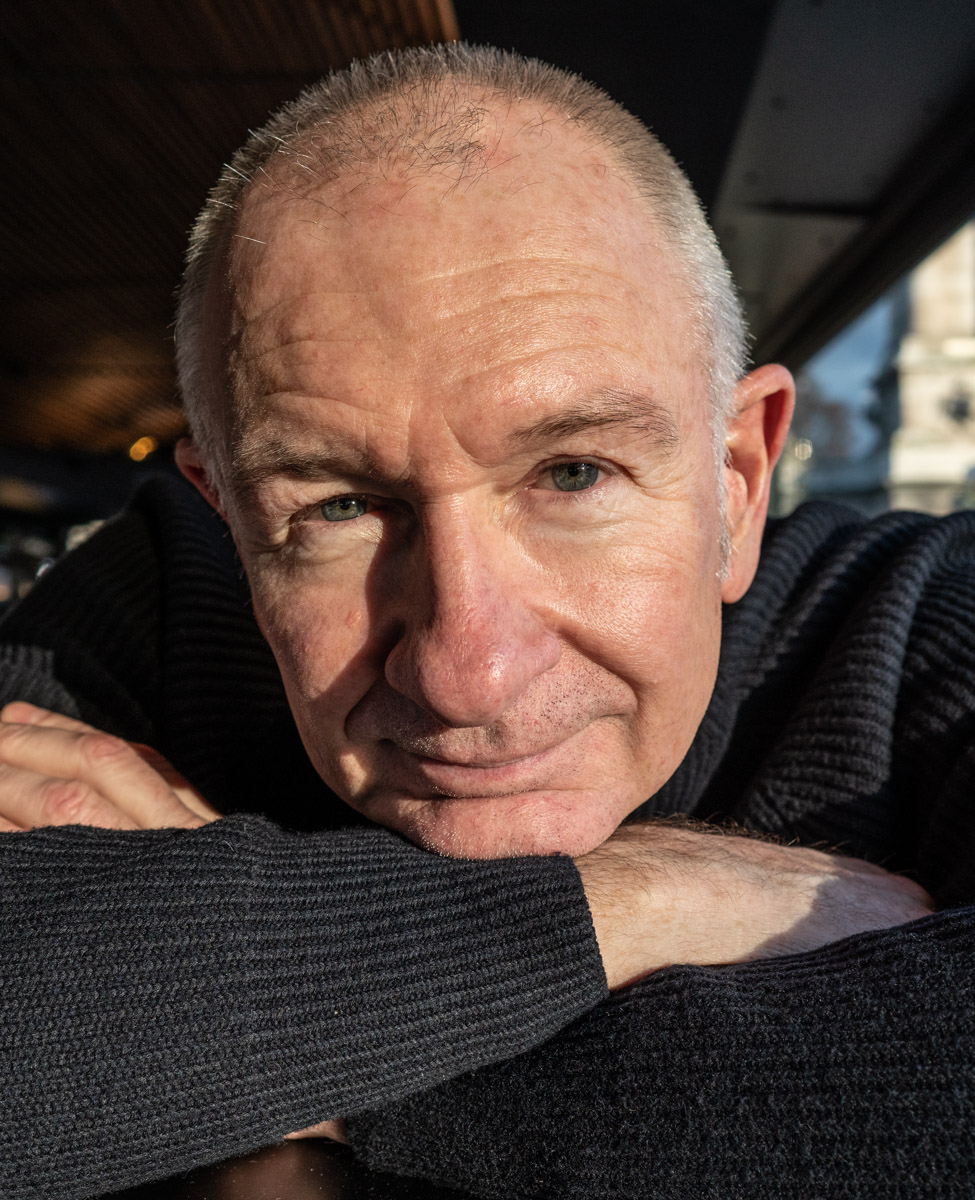
- Paweł Edelman, 2019
- Born: 26 June 1958 (age 68); Łódź, Poland
- Years active: 1988–present

Paweł Edelman (born 26 June 1958) is a Polish cinematographer, known for his collaborations with directors Roman Polanski and Andrzej Wajda.

== Filmography ==
=== Short film ===
Year	Title	Director	Notes
1988	Wstega Möbiusa	Łukasz Karwowski	
1991	Sal	Łukasz Karwowski	Documentary short
1995	L'aube à l'envers	Sophie Marceau	With Patrick Blossier
2008	New York, I Love You	Brett Ratner	1 segment
2009	The New Tenants	Joachim Back	
2016	My Life Is a Play	Sebastien Grousset	

=== Feature film ===
Year	Title	Director	Notes
1991	Gluchy telefon	Piotr Mikucki	
1991	Kroll	Władysław Pasikowski	1st collaboration with Pasikowski
1992	Listopad	Łukasz Karwowski	Also credited as writer
1992	Pigs	Władysław Pasikowski	
1994	Pigs 2: The Last Blood	Władysław Pasikowski	
1994	Nastasja	Andrzej Wajda	1st collaboration with Wajda
1995	The Poison Tasters	Ulrik Theer	
1996	Słodko gorzki	Władysław Pasikowski	
1997	Taranthriller	Miroslaw Dembinski	With Arthur Reinhart
1997	Love Stories	Jerzy Stuhr	
1997	Szczęśliwego Nowego Jorku	Janusz Zaorski	
1997	Kroniki domowe	Leszek Wosiewicz	
1998	Demons of War	Władysław Pasikowski	
1999	Operacja Samum	Władysław Pasikowski	
1999	Prawo ojca	Marek Kondrat	
1999	Sir Thaddeus	Andrzej Wajda	
2000	The Big Animal	Jerzy Stuhr	
2001	Reich	Władysław Pasikowski	
2001	Edges of the Lord	Yurek Bogayevicz	
2002	The Pianist	Roman Polanski	1st collaboration with Polanski
2002	The Revenge	Andrzej Wajda	
2004	Ray	Taylor Hackford	
2005	Oliver Twist	Roman Polanski	
2006	All the King's Men	Steven Zaillian	
2007	The Life Before Her Eyes	Vadim Perelman	
2007	Katyń	Andrzej Wajda	
2009	Tatarak	Andrzej Wajda	
2010	The Ghost Writer	Roman Polanski	
2011	Carnage	Roman Polanski	
2012	Aftermath	Władysław Pasikowski	
2013	Venus in Fur	Roman Polanski	
2013	Walesa: Man of Hope	Andrzej Wajda	
2014	Stones for the Rampart	Robert Gliński	
2014	Obywatel	Jerzy Stuhr	
2016	Wszystko Gra	Agnieszka Glinska	
2016	Afterimage	Andrzej Wajda	
2017	Based on a True Story	Roman Polanski	
2018	Intrigo: Death of an Author	Daniel Alfredson	
2019	Intrigo: Dear Agnes	Daniel Alfredson	
2019	Intrigo: Samaria	Daniel Alfredson	
2019	An Officer and a Spy	Roman Polanski	
2019	The Coldest Game	Łukasz Kośmicki	
2022	Corner Office	Joachim Back	
2023	The Palace	Roman Polanski	
2023	Lee	Ellen Kuras	
2027	Billings	Alexander Ludwig	

Documentary film

Year	Title	Director	Notes
2010	Kręć! Jak kochasz, to kręć!	Andrzej Wajda	With Jacek Petrycki
2011	Roman Polanski: A Film Memoir	Laurent Bouzereau	
2013	Weekend of a Champion	Frank Simon	With Bill Brayne

=== Television ===
Year	Title	Director	Notes
2004	Teatr Telewizji	Lukasz Barczyk	Episode "Hamlet"
2014	Op-Docs	Errol Morris	3 episodes

== Awards and nominations ==
Year	Award	Category	Title	Result
2002	Academy Awards	Best Cinematography	The Pianist	Nominated
2002	BAFTA Awards	Best Cinematography	The Pianist	Nominated
2002	American Society of Cinematographers	Outstanding Achievement in Cinematography	The Pianist	Nominated
2004	American Society of Cinematographers	Outstanding Achievement in Cinematography	Ray	Nominated
2002	César Awards	Best Cinematography	The Pianist	Won
2010	César Awards	Best Cinematography	The Ghost Writer	Nominated
2019	César Awards	Best Cinematography	An Officer and a Spy	Nominated
