= Maciej Kozłowski =

Polish actor (1957–2010)

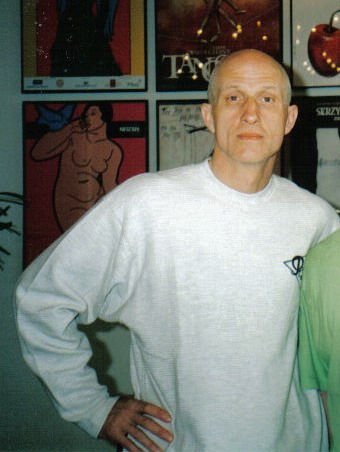
- Born: Marian Kozłowski; 8 September 1957; Kargowa, Polish People's Republic
- Died: 11 May 2010 (aged 52); Warsaw, Poland
- Occupation: Actor
- Years active: 1980–2010

Maciej Kozlowski (8 September 1957 – 11 May 2010) was a Polish actor, mostly known for his roles in Kingsajz, Psy, Kiler, With Fire and Sword and Schindler's List and the TV series M jak miłość.

Kozlowski was born in Kargowa, and was a graduate of the National Film School in Łódź. He also played as a defender in the Polish Artists Football Team. He died in Warsaw, aged 52; the cause of death was cirrhosis of the liver caused by hepatitis C virus. His funeral was attended by: Daniel Olbrychski, Bogusław Linda, Zbigniew Zamachowski, Piotr Zelt, Michał Milowicz, Małgorzata Kożuchowska, Grażyna Wolszczak, Tomasz Karolak, Wiktor Zborowski, Marian Opania, Olaf Lubaszenko, Jan Englert, Robert Więckiewicz, Michał Żebrowski, Artur Żmijewski.

== Filmography ==
=== Films ===
- 1984: After Your Decrees
- 1984: Nie było słońca tej wiosny - Piotr Wolosz
- 1985: Mgła - 'Kim'
- 1985: Osobisty pamiętnik grzesznika przez niego samego spisany - Stranger
- 1988: Kingsajz - Was
- 1989: Szklany dom - urzędnik
- 1990: Piggate - Alan Lecog
- 1990: Mów mi Rockefeller - Matros, wspólnik Jagody
- 1990: Ucieczka z kina "Wolność" - American Actor
- 1990: Po upadku - Uczestnik narady
- 1991: Kroll - Captain
- 1992: Szwadron - Kozlow
- 1992: Psy - Baranski
- 1993: Superwizja - Agent
- 1993: Balanga - Lt. Bakala
- 1993: Pora na czarownice
- 1993: Schindler's List - SS Guard Zablocie
- 1993: Pożegnanie z Marią - Cart Driver
- 1993: Polski Crash (TV Movie) - Dabek
- 1994: Miasto prywatne - Ali
- 1994: Piękna warszawianka - jako portier
- 1995: Jönssonligans största kupp - Ritzie
- 1995: Nic śmiesznego - Maciej
- 1995: Dzieje mistrza Twardowskiego
- 1996: Deszczowy żołnierz - Officer
- 1996: Wirus
- 1996: Poznań 56 - UB Man
- 1996: Drzewa
- 1997: Kiler - Prosecutor
- 1998: Drugi brzeg (TV Movie) - Stimming
- 1999: With Fire and Sword - Maksym Kryvonis
- 1999: Ajlawju - Maniek
- 1999: Na koniec świata - Notary
- 2000: Ostatnia misja - Cortez
- 2000: Liceum czarnej magii (TV Movie) - Dyrektor Kazimierz Pluto
- 2000: To ja, złodziej - Maks
- 2001: Blok.pl - Balagan
- 2001: Wiedźmin - Gwido / Falwick
- 2002: E=MC2 - Alosza
- 2002: Jak to się robi z dziewczynami - Dlugi
- 2003: Stara baśń - Smerda
- 2005: Masz na imię Justine - Abattoir Examiner
- 2005: Oda do radości - Piotr (segment "Warsaw")
- 2007: Jasne blekitne okna - Zbigniew
- 2007: Świadek koronny - Szybki
- 2008: Idealny facet dla mojej dziewczyny - Antoni Chrumski
- 2008: Kochaj i tańcz - Taxi Driver
- 2009: Generał Nil - Tadeusz Grzmielewski
- 2009: Janosik. Prawdziwa historia - First Judge
- 2010: Sufferosa - Rene Levert (final film role)

=== TV series ===
- 1980: Królowa Bona
- 1985: Przyłbice i kaptury - Benko
- 1992: Pogranicze w ogniu - Von Seebohm / Major von Seebohm
- 1996: Matki, żony i kochanki - Waldemar
- 1997-2000: Dom - Aleksander
- 1997: Sposób na Alcybiadesa - Psychologist Jacek Stanislaw Karwid
- 1998: Matki, żony i kochanki II - Waldemar
- 1998: 13 posterunek - Policeman
- 1998-1999: Ekstradycja III - Trainer / BOR Officer
- 1999: Ogniem i mieczem - Krzywonos
- 2000: 13 posterunek 2
- 2000: Klasa na obcasach
- 2001-2002: Na dobre i na złe - Marcin
- 2001: Marszałek Piłsudski - gen. Gustaw Dreszer-Orlicz (2001)
- 2001: Wiedźmin - Falwick / Gwido
- 2002: Przedwiośnie
- 2002: Samo Życie
- 2002-2010: M jak miłość - Waldemar Jaroszy
- 2004: Czwarta władza
- 2004: Officer - Michal Matejewski
- 2006: Pogoda na piątek - Krzysztof
- 2007: Ekipa - Arkadiusz Stoch
- 2007: Odwróceni - Roman Kraus 'Szybki'
- 2008-2009: 39 i pół - Zdrada
- 2008: Trzeci officer - Michal Matejewski
- 2009: Ojciec Mateusz - Rosa
- 2009: Plebania
- 2010: Szpilki na Giewoncie - Jedrek Skorupa
