= Pigs 2: The Last Blood =

1994 Polish film

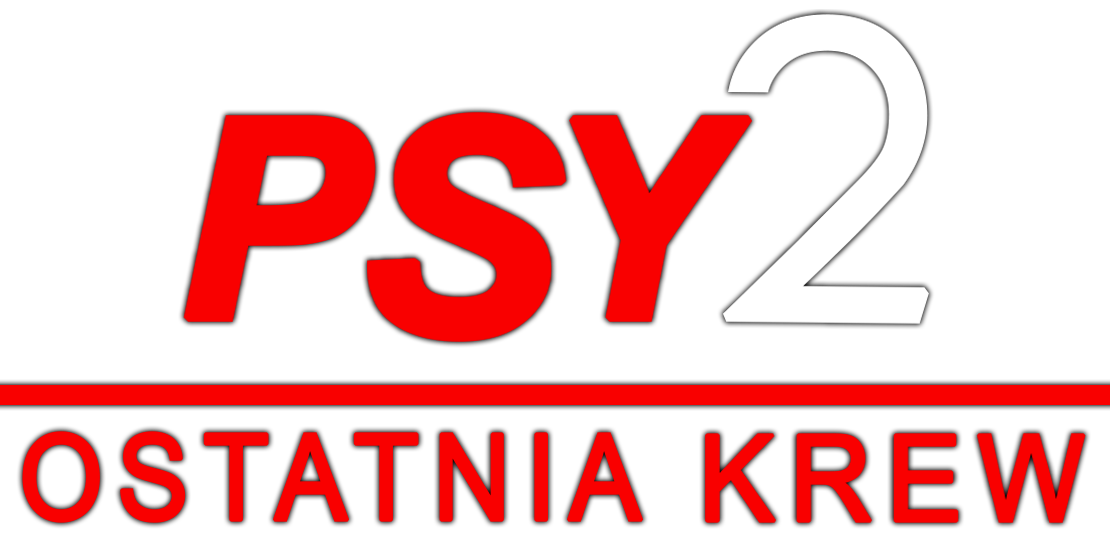
- Film logo as seen on the title screen
- Directed by: Władysław Pasikowski
- Written by: Władysław Pasikowski
- Produced by: Wojciech Fibak; Janusz Dorosiewicz; Maciej Nawrocki
- Starring: Bogusław Linda; Cezary Pazura; Artur Żmijewski; Magdalena Dandourian; Valery Prijomychov; Zbigniew Bielski
- Cinematography: Paweł Edelman
- Edited by: Wanda Zeman
- Music by: Michał Lorenc
- Distributed by: Agencja Produkcji Filmowej
- Release date: 5 April 1994
- Running time: 98 minutes
- Languages: Polish; Russian
- Box office: 700,000 admissions (Poland)

Pigs 2: The Last Blood (Polish: Psy 2. Ostatnia krew, lit. 'Dogs 2. The Last Blood') is a Polish crime thriller directed by Władysław Pasikowski. The film was released on 5 April 1994, is a sequel to 1992's Pigs, and was followed by 2020's Pigs 3.

== Plot ==
Poland in 1994. Franciszek Maurer ("Franz") is released from prison. He finds employment with Radosław Wolf, an arms dealer who just returned from Serbia. Maurer pulls to the gang former police colleague, "Nowy". Franz does not know that the whole time Nowy maintains contact with Major Bień. When Franz, Wolf and Nowy have to organize a transport of weapons to Sarajevo by trucks. Franz informs the police about the planned transport. At the last moment the heads of the gang change the plan to use a train instead. Franz has to stop the weapons-loaded train by himself.

== Cast ==
- Bogusław Linda – Franciszek "Franz" Maurer
- Cezary Pazura – Waldemar "Nowy" Morawiec
- Artur Żmijewski – Radosław Wolf
- Magdalena Dandourian – Nadia
- Valery Prijomychov – Sawczuk
- Zbigniew Bielski – Kaniewski
- Aleksander Bednarz – Major Bień
- Edward Linde-Lubaszenko – Stopczyk
- Jan Machulski – Walenda
- Sławomir Sulej – Wyrek
- Jerzy Zelnik – Sarzyński
- Tomasz Dedek – Wawro, subordinate of major Bień
- Sergey Shakurov – Colonel Jakuszyn
- Piotr Zaichenko – Ganz
- Iwona Katarzyna Pawlak – Mariola Morawiec
- Ryszard Kotys – train driver
- Mariusz Pilawski – waiter
- Tomasz Jarosz – car thief
- Robert Więckiewicz – car thief
- Denis Delic – Serb

== Reception ==
The film was the highest-grossing Polish film of the year with 700,000 admissions and fourth overall in Poland for 1994.
