= Boys Don't Cry (2000 film) =

2000 Polish film by Olaf Lubaszenko

- Directed by: Olaf Lubaszenko
- Screenplay by: Mikołaj Korzyński
- Starring: Maciej Stuhr; Wojciech Klata; Michal Milowicz
- Release date: 25 February 2000
- Running time: 90 minutes
- Country: Poland
- Language: Polish

Boys Don't Cry (Polish: Chłopaki nie płaczą) is a Polish film directed by Olaf Lubaszenko. It was shot between 9 June 1999 and 14 July 1999 on location in Warsaw and Jelenia Góra. The film premiered on 25 February 2000, and has received a cult following over the years.

== Plot ==
A student of Chopin University of Music, Kuba Brenner, an aspiring violinist, finds out that his girlfriend Weronika left him for Jarosław Keller, a local gangster. His car breaks down while trying to get to his violin exam, so he has to borrow another car from his friend, Cichy. He is late for his exam, so the doyen Zajączek does not allow him to take it, forbidding Kuba from proceeding to the final exam and withdrawing him from the scholarship in France, which only takes place once every four years.

At the same time, Kuba's friend Oskar wants to cure acne and visits a dermatologist who advises him to have sex. Oskar is shy and has trouble talking to girls and Kuba advises him to visit a brothel. The two arrange a visit at Oskar's uncle's home where his cousin Laska also lives. They order two girls – Lili for Oskar and Angelika for Kuba. In the evening, the brothelkeeper, Czesiek, brings the girls to the house. Kuba is not glad about the meeting, but Oskar and Lili seem to hit it off well. After an hour, Czesiek comes back for the girls and payment. They pay 200 złotys, but Czesiek says that it should be 200 US dollars. They do not have enough money, so Czesiek decides to take a precious golden figure of a wizard from Africa, which belongs to Oskar's uncle. After that, the boys try to retrieve the figure. Kuba sells his violin in a pawnshop, which he now considers to be useless.

After that, Kuba visits the club "Czarny Lotos" to retrieve the figure. At the same time, an arranged visit of two gangsters from Szczecin – Fred and Grucha – who want to make a deal worth 1.5 million złotys, is taking place. The chef does not want to make it personally, so he deputizes his 30-year-old son, Bolec, who is not interested in the gangster life. The deal between the guest gangsters and Bolec fails, because they consider him a crock and he screws several things up, so they refuse to make a deal. At the same time, Kuba enters the room, so Fred orders Bolec to shoot him. He mistakenly shoots Grucha, which results in a shootout where Czesiek, Grucha, and Bolec all get injured. Kuba runs away from the club, but his car breaks down again and he borrows yet another car.

Grucha, shot in the head, survives due to a titanium plate implanted in his frontal lobe, but he loses his memory. Fred notices that the luggage with the money disappeared. He claims that Kuba has stolen it, so Czesiek orders them to find and kill him. Kuba realizes what could happen to him, so he visits Laska, who gives him a marijuana joint and advises him that he should do anything that he wants in his life. Kuba also meets with Cichy, who gives him a gun. Bolec finds Kuba and takes him to a forest outside Warsaw to kill him. Bolec refuses when he finds out that Kuba likes classical Polish music. Kuba advises him to start playing music professionally. Meanwhile, Fred and Grucha find Kuba's documents in his car and begin looking for him. A few days later, Kuba receives a letter saying that he qualified for the scholarship in France, but Fred is in his apartment. Kuba runs to the roof, but he runs into Weronika, who has recently ended her relationship with Jarosław; he is not actually a gangster and his real surname is not Keller, but Psikuta. (Note: psi kutas in Polish means 'dog's cock'.) While Kuba is on the roof, Fred goes down onto the street and starts to threaten that he will kill Weronika if Kuba does not get down. Kuba complies and Fred catches him and puts him in the trunk of his car.

In the trunk, Kuba calls Oskar but Laska, who is smoking marijuana with his friends, picks up instead. Laska and friends claim that they will help him alone without the police's help. After they come to the place of the planned crime, Fred is angry at Grucha and throws out Grucha's last cigarette, as he does not allow him to smoke in his car. Kuba lends his own cigarette, which is actually a marijuana joint, which Laska has given to him prior. Grucha starts to behave unreasonably, while Fred starts laughing at Grucha's pink sweater with a pear on it, which was a gift from Angelika, whom he met at the club shortly before the shootout. When it is time for Fred to kill Kuba, Grucha kills Fred instead for joking about his sweater. Meanwhile, as Laska and friends are driving to help Kuba, they are stopped by police. The policemen are drunk and go home, so the boys have to tow a police car. Later the boys, being high, think that they are being chased by the police, so they go to maximum speed. A tow rope snaps and the police car lands directly at place of the crime, also hitting Fred's car and revealing that the luggage with the money was in the trunk of Fred's car all along. The police arrest Grucha.

When Kuba is at the airport, leaving to France, he meets his rector Rudolf, who is leaving to Milan. He finds out from him that Zajączek made problems because he does not like Kuba personally and he also does not like Kuba's father, who is a world-class conductor and Rudolf's friend. Zajączek was also very angry when he found out about Kuba's success during his stay in the United States, so in his anger he caused a car accident. Kuba then meets Oskar and Lili, who have started a relationship after she becomes pregnant.

== Cast ==
- Maciej Stuhr – Kuba Brenner
- Wojciech Klata – Oskar
- Tomasz Bajer – Laska
- Cezary Pazura – Fred
- Mirosław Zbrojewicz – Grucha
- Michał Milowicz – Bolec
- Anna Mucha – Lili
- Bohdan Łazuka – chef
- Andrzej Zieliński – Silnoręki
- Mariusz Czajka – Alfons Czesiek
- Mirosław Baka – Cichy, Kuba's friend
- Tadeusz Huk – older policeman
- Radosław Pazura – young policeman
- Paweł Nowisz – Dziekan Zajączek
- Edward Linde-Lubaszenko – rector Rudolf
- Asja Łamtiugina – Professor
- Magdalena Mazur – Weronika
- Monika Ambroziak – Cycofon
- Paweł Deląg – Jarek Psikuta
- Leon Niemczyk – "Król Sedesów", Laska's father
- Krzysztof Kosedowski – Gray

== Video game ==
In 2005, Chłopaki Nie Płaczą, a video game based on the film, was published.
