= Grand Hotel, Łódź =

Hotel in Łódź, opened in 1887

Grand Hotel
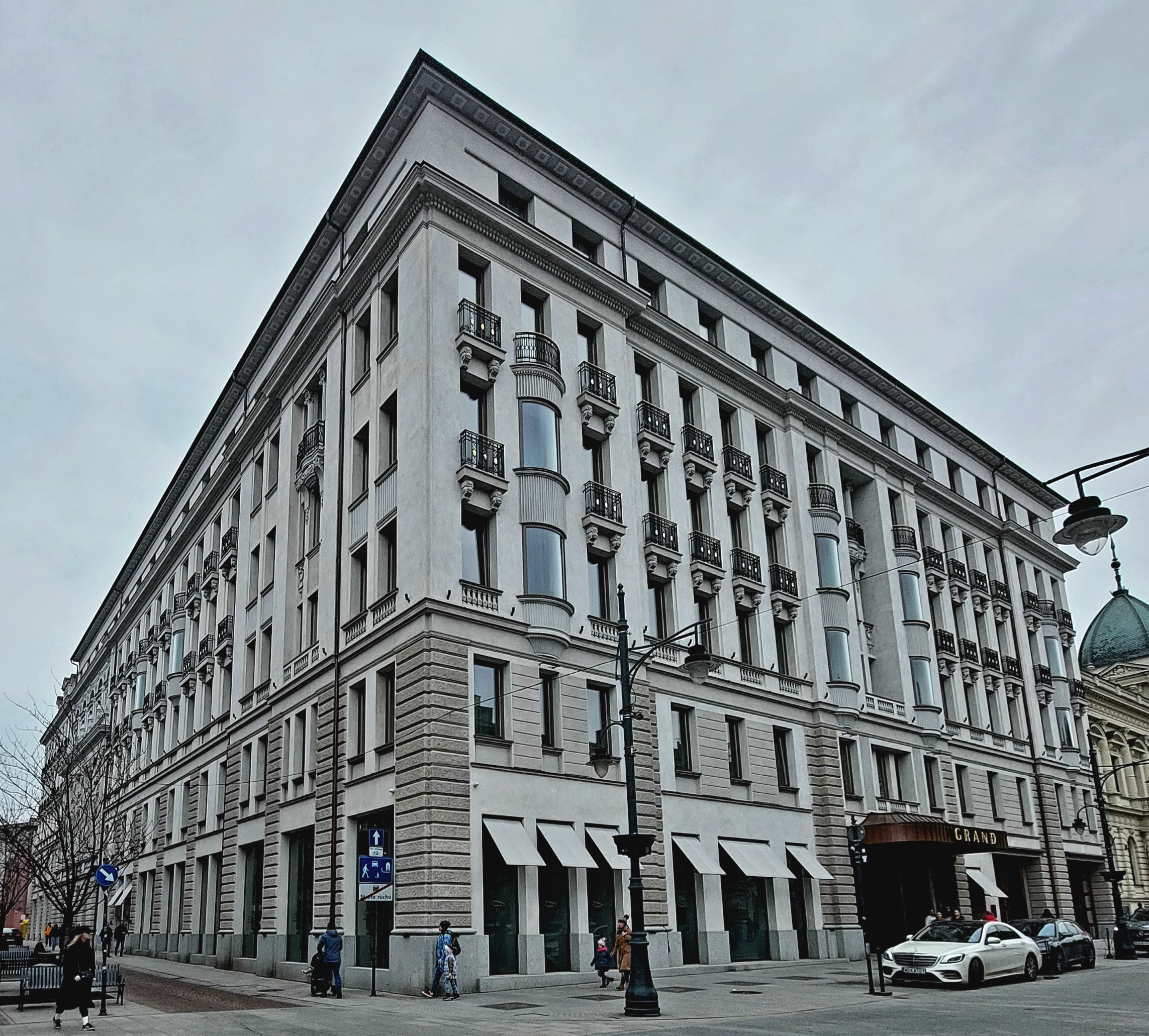
- The edifice seen from Piotrkowska
- Interactive map of the Grand Hotel area

General information
- Architectural style: Eclectic
- Location: 72 Piotrkowska Street, Łódź, Poland
- Coordinates: 51°46′06″N 19°27′24″E
- Opened: 9 October 1887; 138 years ago
- Renovated: 1912–1913, 1942, 2019–2023
- Client: Edward Haentschel; Ludwik Meyer
- Owner: Holding Liwa

Technical details
- Floor count: 6

Design and construction
- Architects: Hilary Majewski; Dawid Lande

Other information
- Number of rooms: 153
- Number of restaurants: 2: Malinowa Restaurant; Grand Cafè
- Facilities: gym, pools, saunas, Turkish bath, event space
- Parking: yes

Website
- grand.hotel.com.pl/grand-hotel

Grand Hotel Łódź, commonly known as Hotel Grand, is a historic luxury hotel at 72 Piotrkowska Street, in the heart of Łódź, Poland. Operating almost continuously since 1887, it is one of the city's most recognisable landmarks. Following a refurbishment between 2019 and 2023, the hotel returned to its 5-star classification.

The first edifice which existed on the site was designed by Hilary Majewski, the chief architect of Łódź. In 1913, the hotel reopened after a major restoration and modernisation effort, with designs by Majewski and Dawid Lande. It was then that the hotel transitioned in architectural manner from historical Neo-Renaissance to Early Modernist. At the time, the opulent Grand Hotel hosted some of the most important celebrities in Poland, notably film starts, artists, musicians and politicians. In the 1940s, it was part of Poland's postwar political scene. However, it lost much of the architectural detail and its prestige declined in the 1970s and 1980s, only to resurface after the most recent restoration. Previously managed by the Polish travel agency Orbis, it has been owned by Holding Liwa hoteliers since 2008.

The Grand Hotel has 153 rooms, simultaneously offering extensive dining, wellness, fitness, and spa services, as well as individual guest treatments. There are two restaurants located within the facility, along with a cigar room, a private theatre-auditorium, conference halls and event space.

== History ==
=== Early years (1824–1885) ===
The history of the site dates back to 1824–1828, when it was designated in official records and zoning documents as greenfield land to be settled by flax and cotton weavers. In 1842, it was purchased by two weavers as a perpetual leasehold estate and in the same year a single-storey timber house was erected on the site. The house subsequently hosted a private elementary school. In 1860, Edward Hentschel acquired the lot in an equal exchange-like transaction and purchased the neighbouring property in 1867 to construct a textile factory with a dyehouse. By 1872, the old dwelling was demolished and a new two-storey tenement was built with a much more elaborate design (decorative attics, friezes, and sculptures, among others). Two years later, Hentschel's factory was destroyed by fire; with no aim at reconstruction, the debris were then bought by Ludwik Meyer and Juliusz Karol Kunitzer, both considered to be textile tycoons. As sole owner and having moved his industrial facilities elsewhere, Meyer decided to transform the existing structures into a guest house in 1885.

=== Beginnings of the hotel (1887–1912) ===
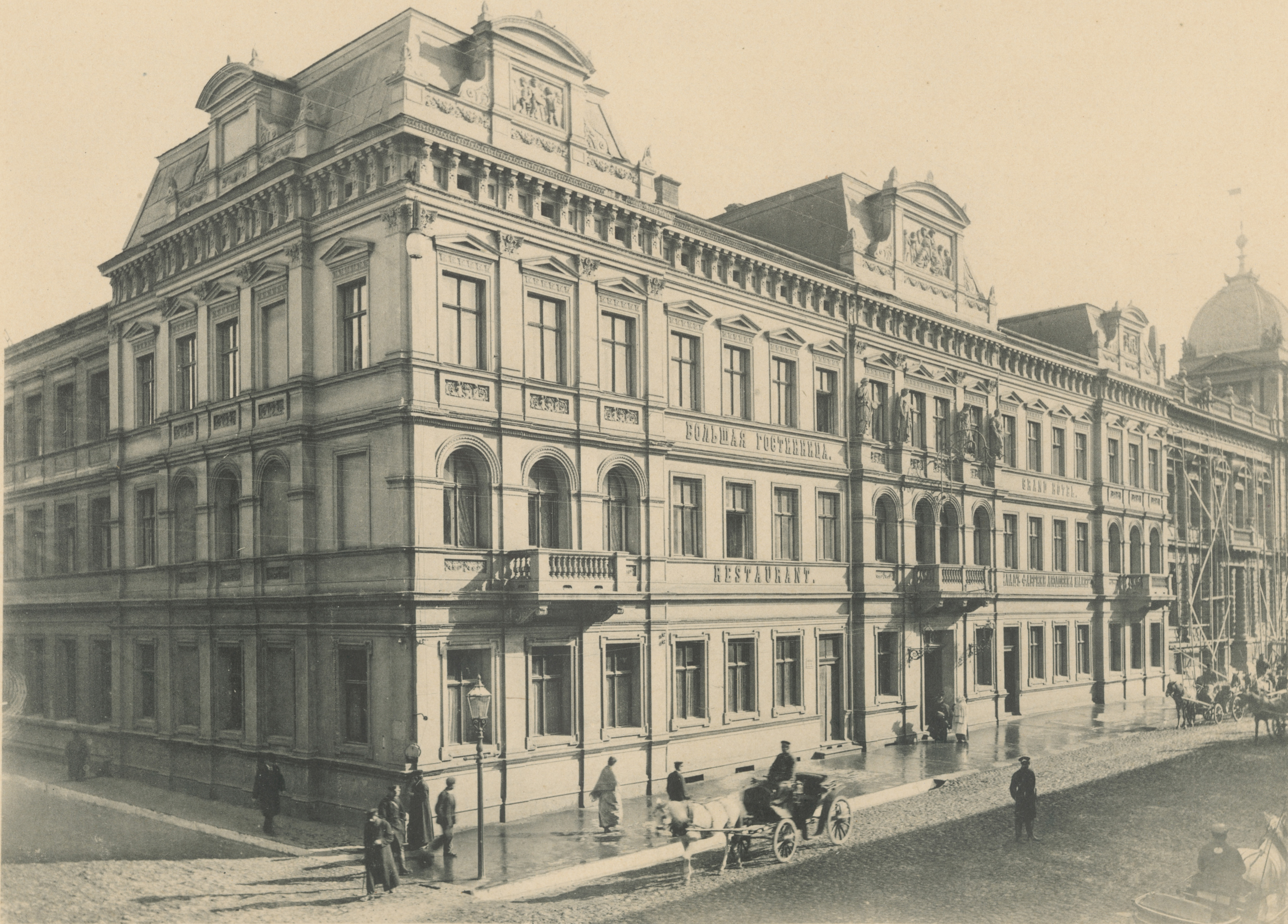
A photograph of the first Grand Hotel, 1896.

The Grand Hotel, designed in the Renaissance Revival by chief architect Hilary Majewski, was completed in two years and opened on 9 October 1887 with 45 rooms. By 1896, the number of rooms grew to 70 and comprised a restaurant and a ballroom. Nonetheless, it was still a modest establishment; only some rooms were fitted with the proper amenities, such as baths. The majority of rooms possessed simple washing basins that had to be manually filled with boiled water brought in jugs or vessels by the hotel staff. Heating was delivered through individual masonry heaters in each room and not by a hotel furnace or centralised heating. (Note: Błądek suggests that the hotel did not have central heating until 1967.) However, the hotel did have marble interiors and a well-maintained garden in its courtyard. Meyer sold the hotel in 1904 to a joint-stock company owned by the Bank Handlowy (Polish Commercial Bank) and, in 1906–1907, incandescent light bulbs replaced the hotel's gas lighting when it was connected with the city's electrical grid. In 1911, a consortium of wealthy industrialists acquired the building from Bank Handlowy in a share buyout, with an aim to modernise it and create a more grand lodging for a growing city.

=== At the apex (1913–1945) ===
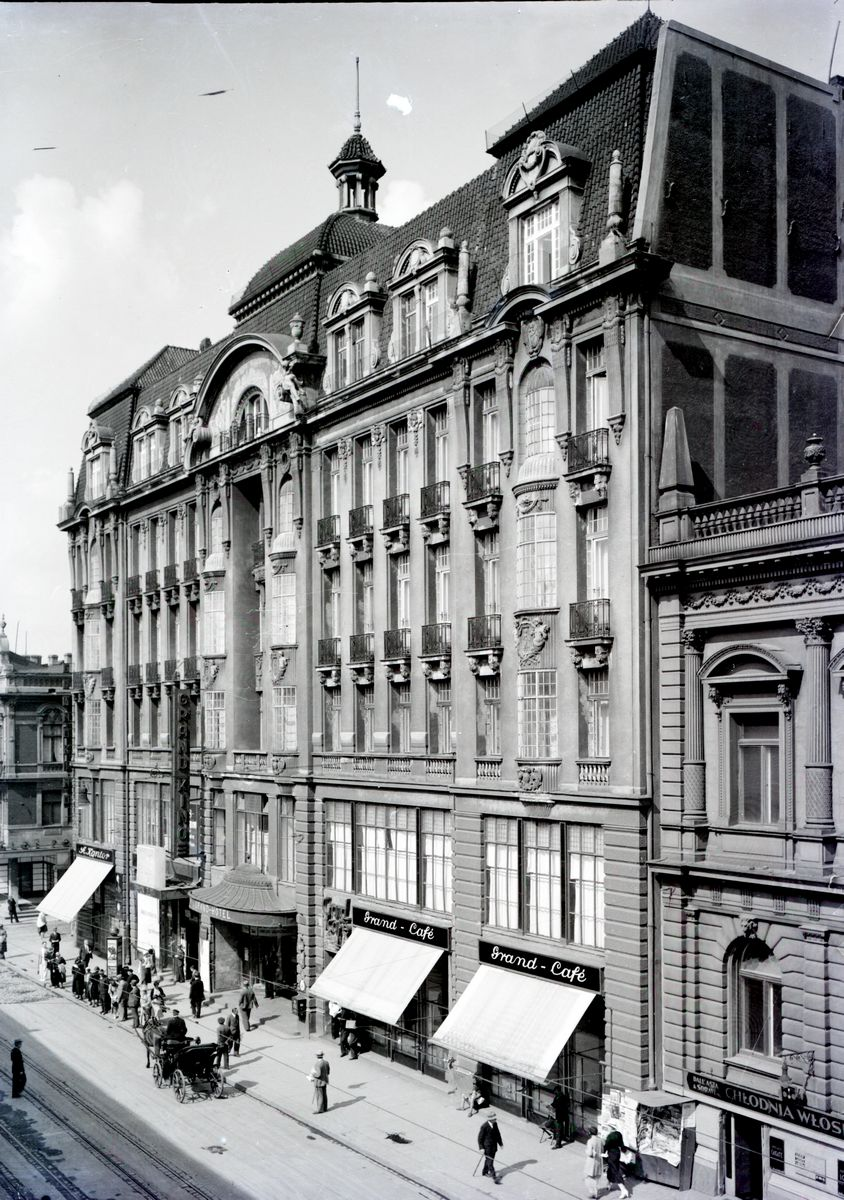
Grand Hotel following its 1912–1913 remodelling, with a mansard roof.

On 21 June 1908, a cinema hall was opened on the premises. Following another renovation in 1912–1913 by Majewski and Dawid Lande, the hotel became a modern place of accommodation. Its exterior was reshaped into Early Modernism and the number of rooms increased to 150. The new amenities were very advanced for the time and included private bathrooms with regulated hot and cold water, central heating, elevators, a telephone service, a personal room call service, water carbonators, ice-machines as well as a private confectionery store, bakery, restaurant, a Viennese-styled café and a beauty salon on the ground floor. A private garden was created for hosting open-air concerts. Juliusz Heinzel's son, Baron Ludwik Heinzel, became the company's largest shareholder during this period and the hotel hosted many Polish celebrities of the day.

Throughout the Second World War, the hotel accommodated Nazi dignitaries and senior military officers. The occupants also changed the hotel's name to Fremdenhof General Litzmann. In January 1942, the Polish resistance targeted the Nazis and planted an incendiary device in the attic which caused a fire to the roof, though the Germans prevented the fire from spreading downward. After damage was cleared, an additional storey was constructed in place of the previous mansard roof.

=== After the war (1945–2007) ===
The Grand Hotel was not destroyed by the retreating German army and quickly restored its pre-war operations after 1945; as Poland's capital Warsaw lay in ruins, many of the administrative offices were temporarily transferred to Łódź and the hotel became a political venue of the Polish People's Republic. Several ministers or politicians of socialist parties, including the later communist Polish United Workers' Party (PZPR), resided there. The cinema hall was refurbished into a theatre stage that same year. In 1950, the hotel began to be managed by the Polish travel agency Orbis, which decided to maximise the value of the premises by removing unnecessary fittings or decorations, and increasing the number of rooms available to guests. Much of the external reliefs and ornaments were purposely dismantled. In the 1970s, the hotel organised cabarets and dance performances, however, its 'ritzy' reputation began to decline and its halls were no stranger to shadow economy, thieves and prostitutes. The hotel fell into disrepair and became characterised by its grey soot-covered façade for many decades.

=== Contemporary (2008–2023) ===
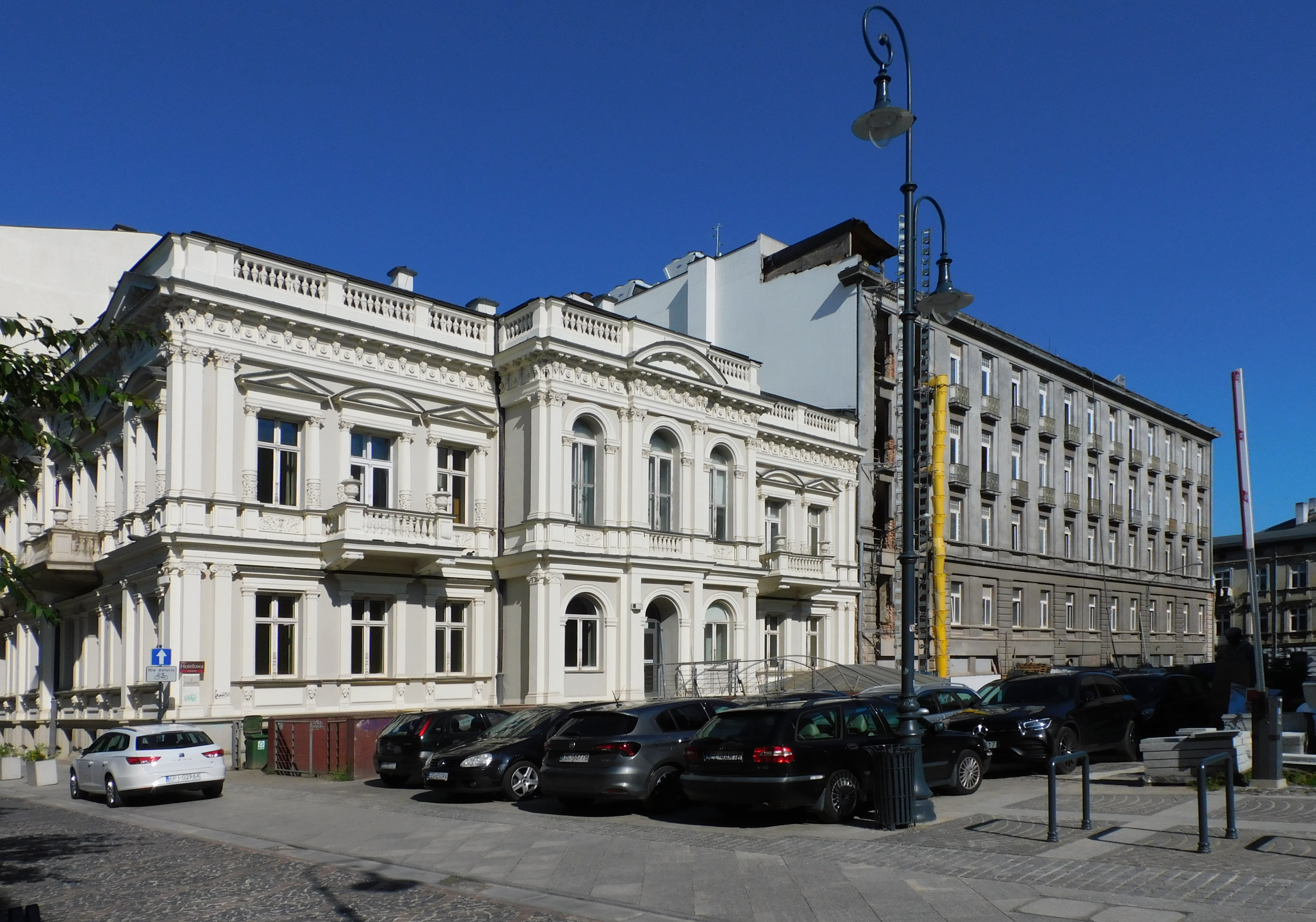
Construction at the hotel's rear.

In 2008, the building was purchased for 73 million PLN by Holding Liwa sp. z o.o., which specialised in hospitality and planned to reinstate the hotel's past reputation. The general remodelling began in 2019. In 2022, the regional Historic Preservation Officer reported to the prosecutor's office that the renovation as well as an unplanned extension were beyond intrusive and irreversibly damaged the hotel's historic integrity. In particular, the removal of the iconic muntins or glazing bars on windows was widely criticised. Despite the protest, the construction works continued until 2023 and the hotel reopened for guests in early January 2024. On 5 July 2024, the hotel was inscribed into the register of the Central List of Hotel Facilities (CWOH) and designated a luxury hotel – the only 5-star establishment in the Łódź Voivodeship.

== Architecture ==
When first built, the Grand Hotel was reminiscent of the Renaissance Revival style, with elements most likely derived from the Italian or French Renaissance periods. It was particularly known for its protruding façade sculptures, richly decorated cornices, pilasters, and a roof comprising pediments, possibly inspired by the châteaus of France or by the palazzos of Italy. The interior was finished with marble and refined wood for parquets and walls. The contractor in charge was the Raumkunst Company from Dresden. It did not, however, possess the standards of a noteworthy and upscale hotel establishment, especially due to its lack of amenities and novelties that were being introduced at the time.

In the aftermath of the first remodelling, the hotel acquired certain aspects of Modernism. Among the new elements were curved bay windows, glaze bars and a large tiled mansard roof with dormers, topped by a small turret. The exterior was adorned by elongated corbels below the cornice, reliefs, cast-iron balconettes (Juliet balconies), and its iconic awning (overhang) above the newly installed revolving doors. The current building maintains an Eclectic form of architecture, but is considered more contemporary than historic. Many of the changes and alterations were criticised by heritage experts or by the general public. According to Gazeta Wyborcza, the voivodeship's Preservation Office stated that "the developer engaged in a gross violation of [heritage] regulations which led to the loss of historical value".

== Facilities ==
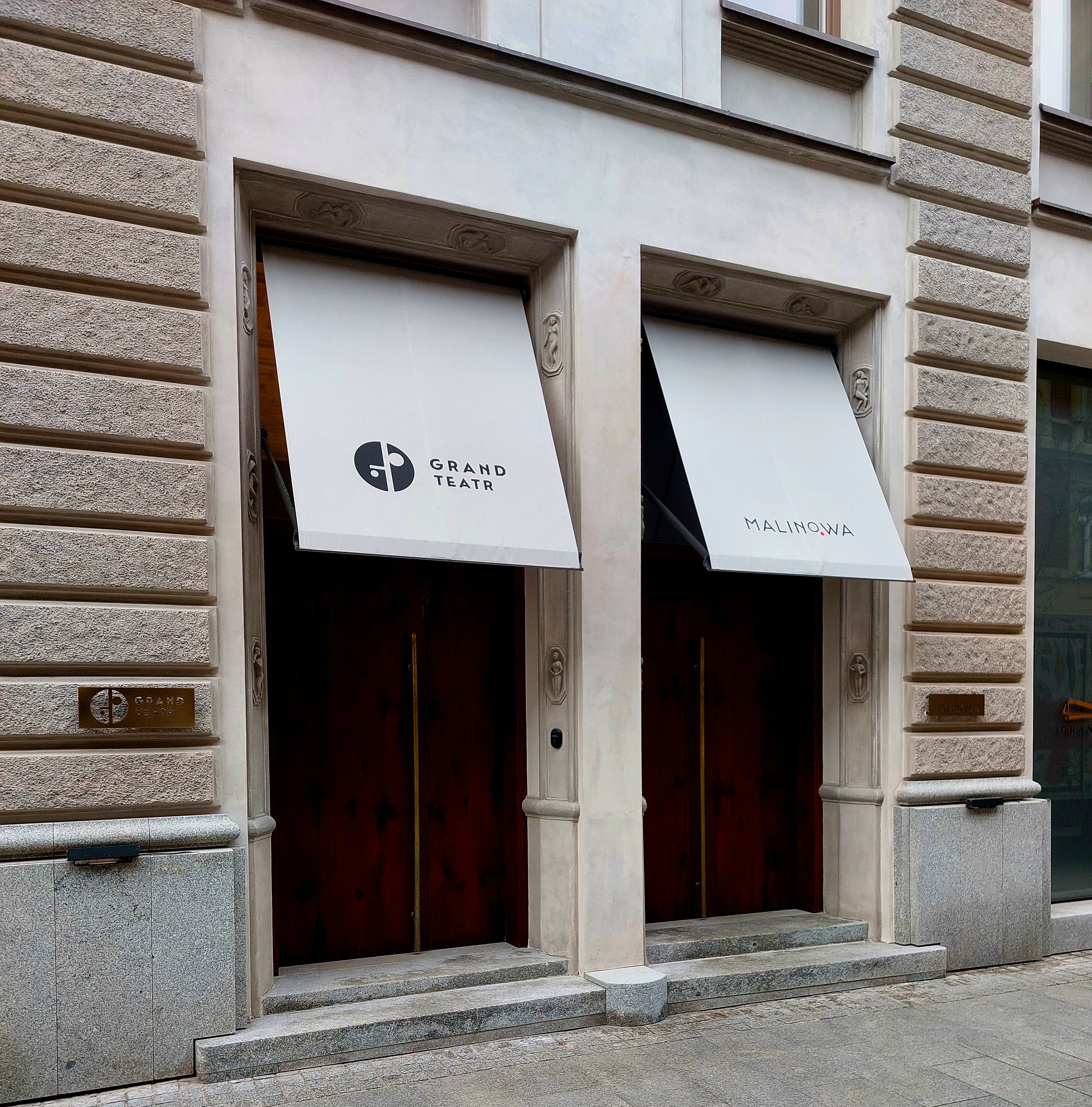
Entry to the private theatre, 2024.

=== Malinowa Restaurant ===
The restaurant offers Polish and international haute cuisine and is situated on the ground level. It comprises two chambers; the Malinowa (Raspberry) – a former ballroom with a balcony and a blend of historical and modern design – as well as the smaller Złota (Golden) Hall that can accommodate approximately 50 guests.

=== Grand Cafè ===
A bistro-type cafeteria offering baked goods, pastries, confectionery, and smaller meals as well as alcoholic (cocktails, spirits, liqueurs, wines) and non-alcoholic beverages.

=== Cigar Room ===
A separate room for cigar connoisseurs and cigarette smokers that features 19th-century stained glass windows and a bar. The seating comprises armchairs and small side tables.

=== Wellness and spa ===
The wellness and spa area includes private pools, Finnish and steam saunas, hot stones, and a Turkish hammam. Among the treatments available are individual massages, manicure, and bathing sessions. The hotel also offers gym space and training rooms.

=== Theatre and events ===
A private theatre-auditorium, 314 square metres (3,380 sq ft) in area with a balcony and staging, is located within the hotel.

== In popular culture ==
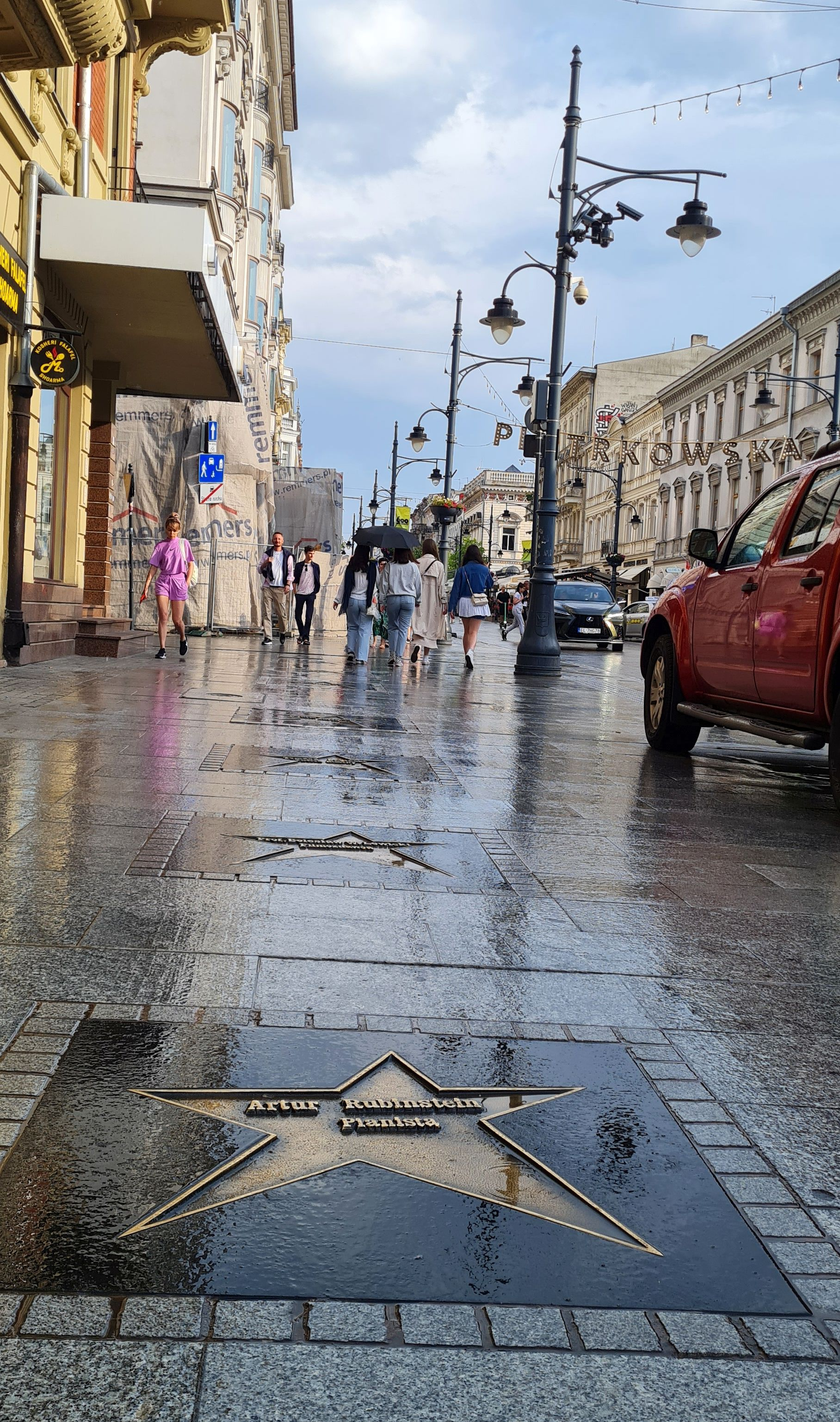
The city's Walk of Fame (Aleja Gwiazd) extends in front of the hotel.

The hotel featured prominently in Polish literature and cinema throughout its history, which contributed to its fame within Poland. Writer Władysław Reymont, recipient of the 1924 Nobel Prize in Literature, described its high renown in his novel The Promised Land (Ziemia obiecana). Moreover, the sidewalk at the hotel's entrance is paved with the so-called Lodz Walk of Fame (Aleja Gwiazd) comprising brass stars with the names of prominent Polish-born actors, cinematographers, film directors and producers. Among the most recognisable names are the Warner Brothers, Roman Polański, Pola Negri, Ida Kamińska, Andrzej Wajda, Krzysztof Kieślowski, Jan A. P. Kaczmarek, Agnieszka Holland, Jerzy Hoffman, Jerzy Kawalerowicz, and Krzysztof Zanussi. The hotel also appeared in several films, notably:

- Hotel Pacific (1975), by Janusz Majewski;
- Vabank (1981), by Jan Machulski;
- Kroll (1991), by Władysław Pasikowski;
- Inland Empire (2006), by David Lynch;
- Cold War (2018), by Paweł Pawlikowski.

== See also ==
- History of Łódź
- List of hotels in Poland
