= Pigs (1992 film) =

Psy
- Film poster
- Directed by: Władysław Pasikowski
- Written by: Władysław Pasikowski
- Produced by: Juliusz Machulski
- Starring: Bogusław Linda; Marek Kondrat; Cezary Pazura; Janusz Gajos; Agnieszka Jaskółka; Olaf Lubaszenko
- Cinematography: Paweł Edelman
- Edited by: Zbigniew Nicinski; Wanda Zeman
- Music by: Michał Lorenc
- Distributed by: Agencja Produkcji Filmowej
- Release date: 20 November 1992
- Running time: 104 minutes
- Country: Poland
- Language: Polish

Psy (Polish pronunciation: [ˈpsɨ], "Dogs"), known in English as Pigs, is a 1992 Polish crime thriller directed by Władysław Pasikowski. The film was released on 20 November 1992. Two sequels have followed, 1994's Pigs 2: The Last Blood and 2020's Pigs 3.

== Plot ==
Poland in 1990, right after the fall of communism, former officers of the SB (Poland's communist secret police) are undergoing re-evaluation, in the process of which the country's new democratic leadership is trying to establish whether or not they can be incorporated into the new police service. Franciszek Maurer (Franz) is one of them. He has a notorious service record and is ruthless, but devoted to service - the only thing he cares about, since he became estranged from his wife and son. Eventually he is taken over by the new police force, while one of his best friends, Olgierd Żwirski (Olo), is not. Facing unemployment, Olo joins a newly formed criminal gang, consisting mainly of ex-SB agents, which operates in international narcotics trade. Franz and Olo, who try to co-operate despite the new circumstances, soon face each other as enemies. Moreover, Franz's relationship with Angela Wenz, a young girl he has befriended, becomes more and more complicated as the story continues, especially after Angela meets Olo.

== Cast ==
Actor	Role
Bogusław Linda	Franciszek "Franz" Maurer
Marek Kondrat	Olgierd "Olo" Żwirski
Cezary Pazura	Waldemar "Nowy" Morawiec
Janusz Gajos	Major SB "Siwy" Gross
Agnieszka Jaskółka	Angela Wenz
Maciej Kozłowski	Barański
Edward Linde-Lubaszenko	Captain SB Stopczyk
Jan Machulski	Major SB Walenda
Aleksander Bednarz	Major Bień
Zbigniew Zapasiewicz	Senator Wencel
Artur Żmijewski	Radosław Wolf
