= Operation Simoom =

Polish intelligence operation in Iraq

Operation Simoom (Polish: Operacja Samum) was a top secret Polish intelligence operation conducted in Iraq in 1990.

In 1990 the CIA asked European intelligence agencies to assist in the withdrawal of six American operatives (a mix of CIA and DIA officers) investigating Iraqi troops movements in Iraq before the Gulf War. Several countries, such as the Soviet Union, Great Britain, and France refused to help in such a dangerous operation; only Poland agreed to help.

Poland had connections in Iraq due to Polish engineering firms' construction work throughout the country and sent a few operatives to start working on the operation. Gromosław Czempiński became the commander of this operation, assigned to it by Polish Minister of Internal Affairs and first chief of Urząd Ochrony Państwa, Krzysztof Kozłowski. Czempiński had previously been a spy in the United States and either took part or led many operations against the Western intelligence services. The main plan was to reestablish contact with the hiding American spies and give them Polish passports so they could escape from Iraq in a bus, alongside Polish and Russian workers.

The six agents were hiding in Kuwait and Baghdad for several weeks before the escape was carried out. The operation was very difficult because the Iraqis started to suspect some kind of American-Polish intrigue.

The agents were given refuge at a Polish construction camp, and then provided with passports and put on a refugee bus. An Iraqi officer at checkpoint on the border had studied in Poland and spoke Polish well enough to communicate. When the bus arrived at the border, he asked one of the American spies a question in Polish. Since the spy did not know Polish at all, he pretended to be heavily drunk (another version states that the operative in question fainted). Nevertheless, the bus managed to cross the border with all occupants. Poles moved the agents out of Iraq and into the safety of Turkey. Operatives from both sides returned to their countries. Polish forces rescued not only the agents but also secret maps—detailed maps of various military installations and of crucial points in the capital of Baghdad itself—apparently crucial for Operation Desert Storm.

As a reward for Poland's help, the US government promised to urge other governments to cancel half, or $16.5 billion, of Poland's foreign debt.

In at least two other operations, the Poles later aided another 15 foreigners to escape, mostly Britons, held hostage by the Iraqis as part of Saddam Hussein's "human shield" campaign to deter an allied invasion.

Information about this operation was first revealed in 1995 by The Washington Post. In 1999, Polish director Władysław Pasikowski made a movie, Operacja Samum about this operation; it was the first Polish production co-financed by Warner Bros. and third by HBO.
