= Kroll (film) =

- Directed by: Władysław Pasikowski
- Written by: Władysław Pasikowski
- Produced by: Juliusz Machulski
- Starring: Bogusław Linda; Olaf Lubaszenko; Cezary Pazura; Dariusz Kordek
- Cinematography: Paweł Edelman
- Edited by: Zbigniew Nicinski; Wanda Zeman
- Music by: Michał Lorenc
- Distributed by: Agencja Produkcji Filmowej
- Release date: 11 October 1991
- Running time: 98 minutes
- Country: Poland
- Language: Polish

Kroll is a Polish thriller directed by a debuting Władysław Pasikowski. The film was released on 11 October 1991.

== Plot ==
Poland of the late 1980s. A drafted soldier named Marcin Kroll goes AWOL after a fellow soldier commits suicide due to harassment from the longer-in-service conscripts. One of the unit's commanders, Lieutenant Arek, is ordered to bring Marcin back to the unit before the prosecutors take over the case. The Lieutenant meets Marcin's younger sister Marta, his wife Agata and his best friend Kuba Berger, who is about to go abroad to Austria. Together with soldier Wiaderny they decide to join the search. Finally, Arek manages to capture Kroll and finds that he joined the army voluntarily due to finding his wife cheating on him with Berger. To redeem himself, Berger plans to get Marcin back from the army.

== Cast ==
Actor	Role
Olaf Lubaszenko	Pvt. Marcin Kroll
Bogusław Linda	Lt. Arek
Dariusz Kordek	Kuba Berger
Cezary Pazura	Cpl. Edward Wiaderny
Ewa Bukowska	Agata Kroll
Agnieszka Różańska	Marta Kroll
Tadeusz Szymków	Pvt. Tadeusz "Chudy" Chudziński
Maciej Kozłowski	Captain of Kroll's unit
