= Frycz =

Frycz is a surname. Notable people with the surname include:

- Jan Frycz (born 1954), Polish actor
- Olga Frycz (born 1986), Polish actress
