= Edges of the Lord =

2001 film by Yurek Bogayevicz

- DVD cover
- Directed by: Yurek Bogayevicz
- Written by: Yurek Bogayevicz
- Produced by: Zev Braun
- Starring: Haley Joel Osment; Willem Dafoe; Richard Banel; Liam Hess; Olaf Lubaszenko
- Cinematography: Paweł Edelman
- Music by: Jan A.P. Kaczmarek
- Release date: October 12, 2001
- Running time: 95 minutes
- Countries: United States; Poland
- Language: English
- Box office: $154,768

Edges of the Lord is a 2001 film, written and directed by Yurek Bogayevicz, starring Willem Dafoe and Haley Joel Osment. The film, set in Poland during World War II, tells the story of a wealthy Jewish boy who must pose as a Catholic peasant farmland local in order to avoid capture from Nazi forces.

== Plot ==
Romek (Haley Joel Osment) is the son of a wealthy Jewish couple. When the Nazis invade Poland, the family contacts an old friend and tasks him to hide their son. During this plight, Romek poses as the Catholic nephew of a local farmer (Olaf Lubaszenko), with the aid of a compassionate Catholic priest (Willem Dafoe).

Despite his Jewish upbringing, Romek quickly learns of the Catholic traditions and manages to apply them. The peasants face constant harassment from Nazis, wherein a Hitler youth member rapes one local child. One night, Romek sees the same youth member harassing another local wherein he shoots him dead. A Nazi commander awards him a Nazi uniform and cloak, which he then uses to free some Jews and other locals mistaken as Jews. Tolo joins the other captives in solidarity.

== Cast ==
- Haley Joel Osment as Romek
- Willem Dafoe as Priest
- Liam Hess as Tolo
- Richard Banel as Vladek
- Olaf Lubaszenko as Gniecio
- Małgorzata Foremniak as Manka
- Andrzej Grabowski as Kluba
- Chiril Vahonin as Robal
- Olga Frycz as Maria
- Eugene Osment as German officer at Batylin Field
- Krzysztof Pieczyński as German officer at Trains

== Release history ==
The film was first released in theatres in 2001, in Poland. In 2002, it had theatrical releases in Spain, the Czech Republic, Japan, Italy, Portugal and Hong Kong. In the Czech Republic, it was shown at the Febio Film Festival. Other theatrical releases included Kazakhstan, in 2007 and Belgium, in 2008, among other countries. The film had direct-to-DVD releases in Sweden (2002) and the United States (2005). The 2005 release of the film in the United States, by its distributor, Miramax/Buena Vista, was subject to criticism for delay.

== Critical reception ==
The film was not widely reviewed, and the published reviews were mixed. Haley Joel Osment was described by one reviewer as having an "unusual emotional depth" in the film, where he "emotionally centers the film, with a balanced, thoughtful portrait". This reviewer also correctly predicted that because the film was shot in English, with many of the actors speaking with Polish accents, it would quickly go to video and TV. David Nusair described the film as "a fairly decent set-up that's entirely squandered by Bogayevicz, with the filmmaker's apparent inability to develop these characters beyond their most superficial attributes surely playing a key role in the movie's ultimate (and colossal) downfall." Reviewer John J. Puccio described the film as "a movie that starts grimly, lightens up slightly, and then gets very gloomy, indeed."

== Awards ==
The film won the award for Best Screenplay (by Yurek Bogayevicz, who also directed the film) at the 2001 Polish Film Festival. The film was also nominated for six awards at the 2002 Polish Film Awards: Best Film, Best Supporting Actress (Olga Frycz), Best Director (Yurek Bogayevicz), Best Screenplay (Yurek Bogayevicz), Best Cinematography (Paweł Edelman) and Best Costume Design (Jagna Janicka)
