= Hellhole (2022 film) =

2022 Polish film by Bartosz M. Kowalski

- Polish: Ostatnia Wieczerza
- Directed by: Bartosz M. Kowalski
- Screenplay by: Bartosz M. Kowalski; Mirella Zaradkiewicz
- Produced by: Jan Kwieciński
- Starring: Piotr Żurawski; Olaf Lubaszenko; Sebastian Stankiewicz; Lech Dyblik; Rafał Iwaniuk; Krzysztof Satała; Malwina Dubowska; Zbigniew Waleryś
- Cinematography: Cezary Stolecki
- Edited by: Jakub Kopec
- Music by: Carl-Johan Sevedag
- Production company: Akson Studio
- Distributed by: Netflix
- Release date: October 26, 2022
- Running time: 88 minutes
- Country: Poland
- Language: Polish

Hellhole (Polish: Ostatnia wieczerza, lit. 'Last Supper') is a 2022 Polish horror film set in a Polish monastery in 1987, when a police officer investigating mysterious disappearances infiltrates a remote monastery and discovers a dark truth about its clergy. It is directed by Bartosz M. Kowalski, who also helped write the screenplay with his frequent writing partner, Mirella Zaradkiewicz.

== Plot ==
In 1957, a priest in a church attempts to murder a baby that bears a unique scar, but the Milicja arrive and shoot the priest.

Thirty years later, Father Marek meets Prior Andrzej at a sanatorium where women are brought for exorcism. In his room, Marek unpacks, unzipping a concealed compartment that contains a pistol, flashlight, and other items not allowed in the sanatorium. While changing, he bares his chest, revealing an unusual scar similar to that of the baby. He begins to experience strange phenomena in his room – the cross on the wall rotates, the bathroom mirror fractures, and the wardrobe makes creepy gurgling sounds.

Marek is called to witness a woman's exorcism. She screams while the Prior recites holy words. In addition, the bed quakes, a strange wind blows, and the Prior's cross catches fire. When Marek investigates the room later, he discovers that all the effects were staged. He joins the priests for meals but has trouble eating the food. A few days after the exorcism, he witnesses the priests burying a casket in the church's graveyard, presumably for the girl, whose room is now empty. Piotr, the vice Prior, approaches him stealthily and asks him to meet in the confessional, where he warns Marek to be careful because those who disobey are severely punished. Marek reveals that he is a militiaman investigating missing local women, disguised as a priest because the militia do not want to meddle in church business after what happened with the murder of priest Jerzy Popieluszko. According to Piotr, the Prior fakes the exorcisms to defraud the Curia and the Vatican; however, he is unaware of what happens to the women afterwards. Marek sneaks out to dig up the exorcised woman's grave, finds the coffin empty and is captured.

Prior Andrzej and Father Dawid force him to consume portions of cooked meat, after which Marek loses consciousness. When Father Dawid dozes off, Marek frees himself. In a subsequent struggle, he fatally shoots the Father, then he finds the bodies of the missing women hanging on hooks in the freezer and realizes he was being fed their organs. Piotr explains that the priests believe Marek to be the "chosen one," a baby born during an eclipse who could be used to complete a ritual that involved eating the flesh of seven sinners and drinking the blood of an innocent, after which it would transform into a demon, ushering in a new era of world order. The current priests were working to complete the ritual and realise his destiny. Piotr leads Marek to a hidden exit where he betrays him to the other priests.

When Marek awakens, he is restrained. The Prior explains that the militia's anonymous tip was intended to lure Marek to the sanatorium, that God and the Devil once ruled side by side, and that humans are evil and should be punished by the Devil. The brotherhood has been awaiting the chosen one's birth, and the church itself was constructed around a well that served as a portal to hell. Once the ritual is complete, the Evil One will pass through the portal to hell and assume the body of the chosen one. They envision themselves as the Devil's servants, assisting him in ruling the new world. The priests then bring in a young woman, slit her throat and force Marek to drink her blood. After they finish the ritual, nothing happens. Piotr stabs Marek and tosses his body into the well. Alone in a room with the Prior, Piotr suffocates him using a pillow and assumes control of the sanitorium.

While leading a service the next morning, Piotr rises into the air and blows away as a cloud of flies. A now-demonic Marek freezes the priests and suspends them upside down in the crucifixion pose. Outside, dead flowers and trees begin to bloom again, signifying that the dead are reviving and that the living may eventually pass away. Thunder rumbles as the sky splits open, signifying the beginning of the new global order and the transformation of Earth into Hell.

== Cast ==
- Piotr Żurawski as Marek
- Olaf Lubaszenko as prior Andrzej
- Sebastian Stankiewicz as Monk Piotr
- Lech Dyblik as Antoni
- Rafał Iwaniuk as Monk Dawid
- Krzysztof Satała as Young Monk
- Malwina Dubowska as Blonde
- Zbigniew Waleryś as Priest

== Reception ==
The review aggregator website Rotten Tomatoes reported a 60% approval rating, with an average score of 5.3/10, based on 5 reviews.
