= Dawid Lande =

Polish architect (1868–1928)

- Born: 14 April 1868; Łódź, Piotrków Governorate, Congress Poland, Russian Empire
- Died: 10 September 1928 (aged 60); Karlovy Vary, Czechoslovakia
- Education: Saint Petersburg State Institute of Technology
- Occupation: Architect
- Buildings: State Bank building in Łódź; Grand Hotel in Łódź; Dawid Sendrowicz's brick house Leon Rappaport's villa Mieczysław Pinkus' brick house

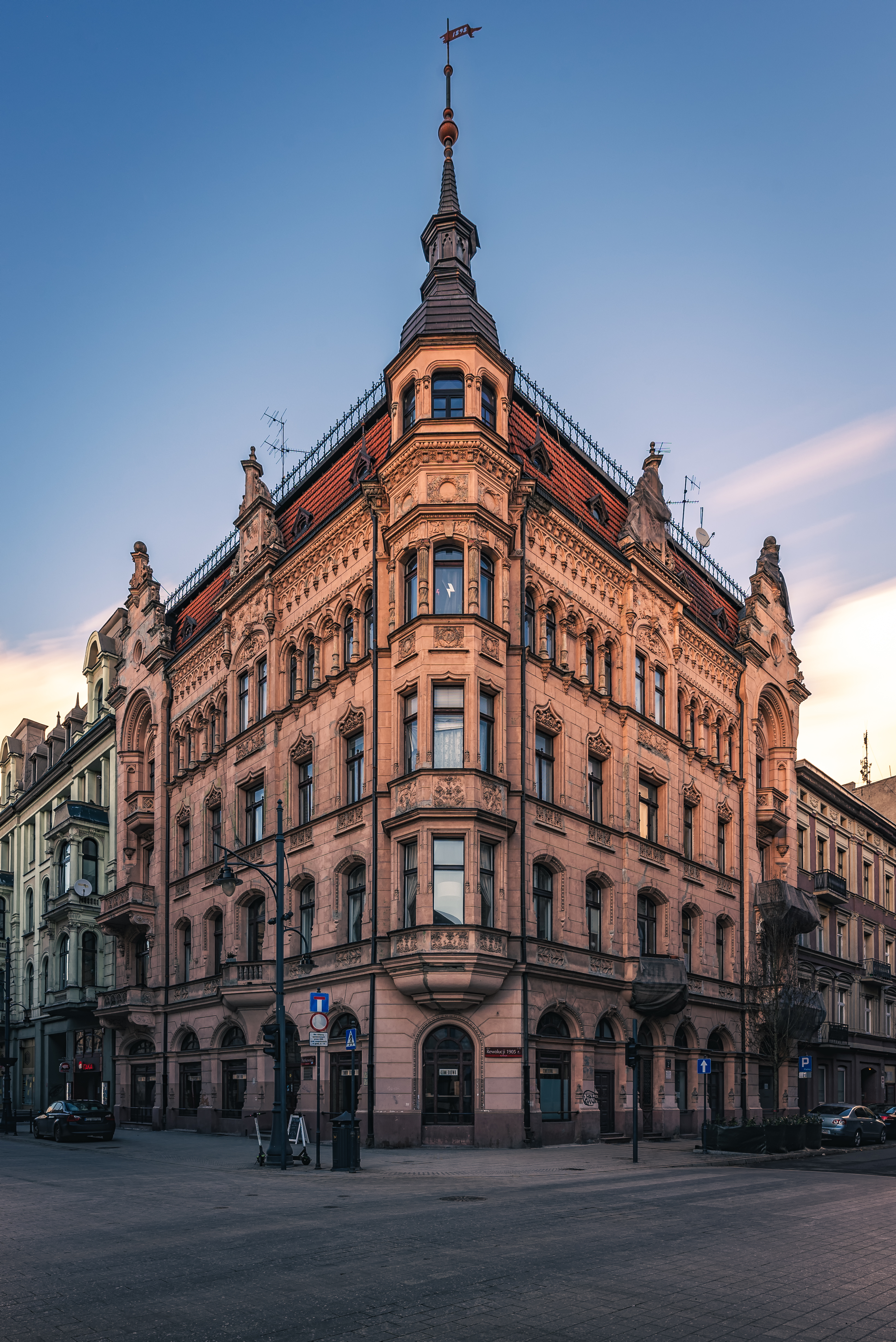
Dawid Sendrowicz’ brick house, designed by Lande in 1897

Dawid Lande (14 April 1868 – 10 September 1928) was a Polish architect.

Lande was born in Łódź, where he attended the trade school, and travelled to Saint Petersburg to study at the Institute of Civil Engineering. After completing his studies, he worked for two years in Berlin at the architect office "Keyser und Grossheim" before he travelled back to his hometown to set up his own business there.

Dawid Lande was one of the city's most popular architects of the time, known for his projects in Łódź and Warsaw. He was best known for the Łódź branch building of the State Bank of the Russian Empire, Dawid Sendrowicz’ brick house, Hotel Grand, Leon Rappaport's villa and Mieczysław Pinkus’ brick house. He died in Karlovy Vary, aged 60.
