= Chłopaki Nie Płaczą (video game) =

2005 video game

Boyz Don't Cry
- Cover art of the game.
- Developer: L'Art
- Release: WW: 30 March 2005
- Genre: Adventure
- Mode: Single-player

Boyz Don't Cry (Polish: Chłopaki Nie Płaczą) is an adventure video game developed by L'Art, released on 30 March 2005.

== Development ==
Warsaw-based L'Art employs 25 people. It is known within the Anglosphere for publishing localized versions of video games like Myst III, Nocturne and Hopkins FBI. The company initially focused on local game versions and multimedia presentations in order to increase funding for a new, unique video game. The company finalized this game while developing Ski Jumping 2005 and two games set in the modern theatre of war. Maciej Oginski finished writing the game's screenplay and dialogue in December 2003. The development process officially began a few months later.

Oginski aimed to write a script in the style of Monty Python and South Park that would be enjoyable to those who had not seen the earlier films. The finished script consisted of 500 pages, and voice actors recorded over five hours of dialogue, filled with slang, newspeak and expletives.

Developers chose to make the game in 2D as they were against 3D and felt FMV was tacky. It was reported in a Just Adventure preview, published 19 August 2004, that the company hoped to find a North American publisher for the game. They ended up publishing the title themselves. The game was originally meant to be published in Poland in September 2004.

== Plot and gameplay ==
The game is loosely based on the comedy film Chłopaki nie płaczą (Boys Don't Cry, 2005) and centers on a duo of gangsters named Fred and Grucha.

Gameplay is similar to a classic two-dimensional LucasArts adventure game, where players interact with characters, collect inventory items and complete puzzles to advance the story.

== Critical reception ==
Przygodoskop thought the game would appeal to players who just wanted a fun experience, noting that it "wasn't ambitious, intellectual, or a milestone". GryPC wrote that the game's script could reasonably be used as a sequel to the film Chłopaki nie płaczą. Game Press gave specific praise to the title's "Polonization" for its emphasis on appealing to Polish players and including historical or cultural references they would likely appreciate. Adventure Gamers enjoyed the title's "gorgeous [...] sumptuous looking stylized artwork." Gry.imro thought it was the best Polish adventure game in years. Imperium Gier praised the game's humour and cast of characters, but disliked the plot and gameplay. Gry.mocny disliked the "annoying" interface but appreciated how the game was not merely a straight remake of the film. Gra.pl noted the game's humor contained a large amount of social and political satire.
