= Asja Łamtiugina =

Polish actress (1940–2023)

- Born: 8 November 1940; Grodno
- Died: 31 March 2023 (aged 82)

Asja Łamtiugina (8 November 1940 – 31 March 2023) was a Polish actress and stage director.

== Life and career ==
Born in Grodno, Łamtiugina made her professional debut in 1964, at the Osterwa Theatre in Gorzów Wielkopolski. Since then she started an intense stage activity, also performing in films and on television and working with major Polish directors such as Krzysztof Kieślowski, Andrzej Wajda, and Krzysztof Zanussi. In 1995 she made her debut as a stage director, directing her own play Pies. Her last role was in 2011, as a guest star in three episodes of the soap opera Na Wspólnej.

Łamtiugina died on 31 March 2023, at the age of 82. She was once married to the actor Edward Linde-Lubaszenko, and was the mother of the actor and director Olaf Lubaszenko.
