= Operation: Nation =

2022 Polish film by Piotr Kumik

- Polish theatrical release poster
- Polish: Kryptonim: Polska
- Directed by: Piotr Kumik
- Written by: Jakub Rużyłło; Łukasz Sychowicz
- Produced by: Jerzy Dzięgielewski; Paweł Heba; Maciej Sojka; Roman Szczepanik
- Starring: Maciej Musiałowski; Magdalena Maścianica; Borys Szyc; Antoni Królikowski; Cezary Pazura; Piotr Cyrwus
- Cinematography: Piotr Śliskowski
- Edited by: Jakub Tomaszewicz
- Music by: Tomasz Rałowski
- Production companies: Orphan Studio; Canal+ Polska
- Distributed by: Kino Świat; Netflix
- Release date: 2 September 2022 (Poland)
- Running time: 97 minutes
- Country: Poland
- Language: Polish

Operation: Nation (Polish: Kryptonim: Polska) is a 2022 Polish comedy drama film directed by Piotr Kumik. It was released theatrically in Poland on 2 September 2022 before being released internationally on Netflix in 2023.

== Premise ==
Staszek Sułkowski is a member of the Radical Youth Association, an inept far-right Neo-Nazi group in Białystok. Although he doesn't necessarily believe in the group's values, being a member gives him a sense of purpose and belonging. He meets Pola Ratajczyk, a left-wing activist, and they soon begin a forbidden-love affair.

== Cast ==
- Maciej Musiałowski as Staszek Sułkowski
- Magdalena Maścianica as Pola Ratajczyk
- Borys Szyc as Roman
- Antoni Królikowski as Kajetan
- Cezary Pazura as Chief
- Piotr Cyrwus as Priest
- Karol Kadłubiec as Mieszko
- Mateusz Król as Brajan
- Karol Bernacki as Mariusz
- Aleksandra Justa as Staszek's mother
- Adam Cywka as Staszek's father

== Production ==
The film was shot in Białystok and Saviour Square in Warsaw.

== Reception ==
The film was panned by critics. John Serba of Decider called the film "muddled" and noted that "its satire falls flat." Barbara Shulgasser-Parker of Common Sense Media wrote, "The movie is as simplistic and moronic as its subjects who blame Jews, Blacks, gays, Muslims, and foreigners for all their woes... It's their utter unawareness of that stupidity that makes this such a tough slog. Cocaine- and alcohol-fueled antics fall flat, resulting in a supremely unfunny version of The Hangover."
