= Olga Frycz =

Polish actress (born 1986)

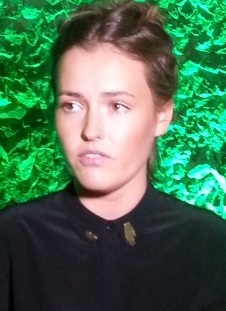
Olga Frycz (2017)

Olga Frycz (born 10 June 1986) is a Polish film and television actress. She has appeared in such films as All That I Love, Weiser and Edges of the Lord as well as the television series M jak miłość and Cisza nad rozlewiskiem.

Frycz was born in Kraków and is the daughter of actor Jan Frycz, and sister of actor Gabriela Frycz.
