= Cezary Pazura =

Actor

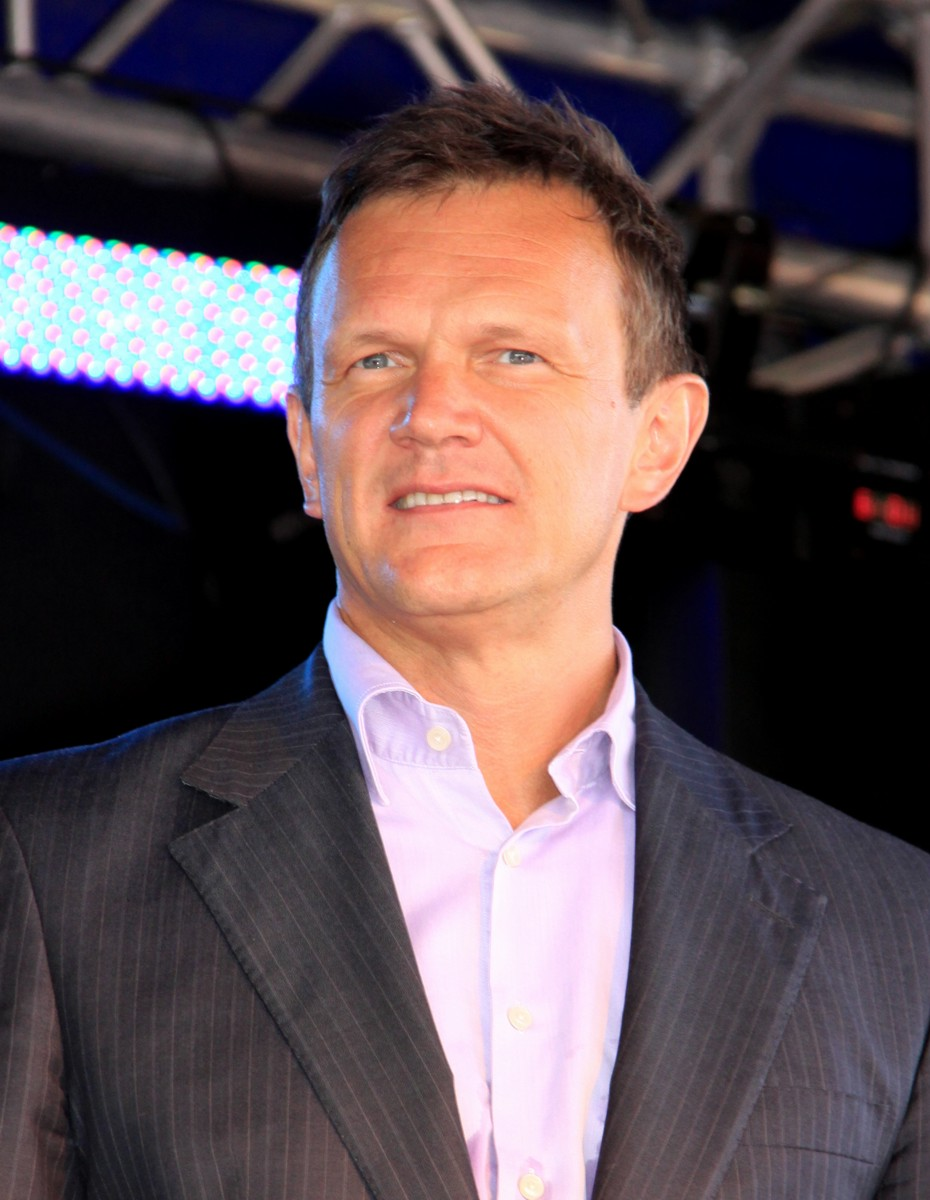
- Pazura in 2009
- Born: 13 June 1962 (age 64); Tomaszów Mazowiecki, Poland
- Education: National Film School in Łódź
- Occupations: actor, singer
- Years active: 1986–present
- Spouse(s): 1. Żaneta Pazura (divorced); 2. Weronika Marczuk-Pazura (divorced); 3. Edyta Pazura (née Zając)
- Children: 4 (3 daughters, 1 son)
- Relatives: Radosław Pazura (brother)
- Musical career
- Genres: Pop
- Label: Zic Zac

Signature
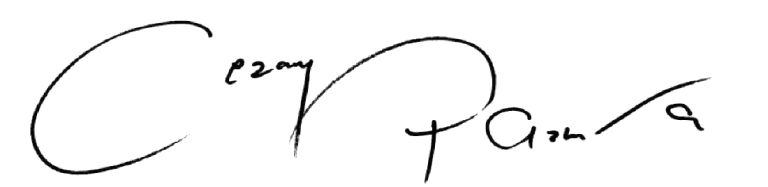

Cezary Andrzej Pazura (Polish: [t͡sɛˈzarɘ ˈandʐɛj paˈzura]; born 13 June 1962 in Tomaszów Mazowiecki) is a Polish actor known for his comedy roles in movies such as Kiler, Chłopaki nie płaczą, Kariera Nikosia Dyzmy and the sitcom 13 posterunek.

In addition to his work as a movie actor, Pazura is also a stand-up comedian and a voice actor. He provided voice for movies dubbed in Polish including Lady and the Tramp (as the Tramp), Ice Age (as Sid), Astérix & Obélix: Mission Cléopâtre (as Numérobis), Inside Out 1 and 2 (as Fear) Shark Tale (as Oscar) and for Pink Panther in various computer games.

His brother Radosław Pazura is also an actor.

== Selected filmography ==
- Pogrzeb lwa (1986)
- Czarne stopy (1987) – Puma
- Deja vu (1990) – Nemetsky velosipedist
- Kroll (1991) – Cpl. Wiaderny
- V.I.P. (1991) – Małyszko
- Rozmowy kontrolowane (1991) – Soldier
- Czarne słońca (1992) – Jan
- Zwolnieni z życia (1992)
- 1968. Szczęśliwego Nowego Roku (1992) – Policeman
- Pogranicze w ogniu (1992, TV Series) – Czarek Adamski
- Wielka wsypa (1992)
- Psy (1992) – Nowy
- Pierścionek z orłem w koronie (1992) – Kosior
- Kawalerskie życie na obczyźnie (1992) – Worker Wielgos
- Cynga (1992)
- Żegnaj Rockefeller (1993, TV Mini-Series) – Fredek
- Uprowadzenie Agaty (1993) – Policeman
- Człowiek z... (1993) – Bolek
- Balanga (1993) – Sergeant
- Lepiej być piękną i bogatą (1993) – Firefighter
- Tylko strach (1993, TV Movie) – Andrzej
- Pożegnanie z Marią (1993, based on This Way for the Gas, Ladies and Gentlemen) – Tomasz
- Enak (1993)
- Dwa księżyce (1993) – Paweł
- Polski Crash (1993, TV Movie)
- Trzy kolory. Biały (1994) – Le propriétaire du bureau de change (Bureau de Change Proprietor)
- Psy 2. Ostatnia krew (1994) – Nowy
- Oczy niebieskie (1994)
- Kraj świata (1994, TV Movie)
- Polska śmierć (1995) – Osso
- The Poison Tasters (1995) – Soldier
- Złote dno (1995)
- Nic śmiesznego (1995) – Adam Miauczyński
- Wielki tydzień (1995) – Piotrowski
- Tato (1995) – Cezary Kujawski
- Słodko gorzki (1996) – Trainer
- Little Angel (1996) – Andrzej
- Wirus (1996) – Michael
- Dzieci i ryby (1997) – Wiktor
- Sara (1997) – Cezary / Józef's man
- Sztos (1997) – Synek
- Szczęśliwego Nowego Jorku (1997) – Azbest
- Kiler (1997) – Jurek Kiler
- 13 posterunek (1997–1998, TV Series) – Cezary Cezary
- Kiler-ów 2-óch (1999) – Jurek Kiler
- Ajlawju (1999) – Adam Miauczyński
- 13 posterunek 2 (2000, TV Series) – Czarek
- Zakochani (2000) – Szczepan Zadymek
- Chłopaki nie płaczą (2000) – Fred
- Kariera Nikosia Dyzmy (2002) – Nikodem 'Nikoś' Dyzma
- Dzień świra - Facet na ulicy
- E=mc^{2} (2002) – Andrzej 'Ramzes' Nowicki
- Show (2003) – Czarek
- Zutaten für Träume (2003) – Janek
- Nienasycenie (2003) – Zypcio's father / Putrycydes Tengler / Kocmołuchowicz
- Magiczna Gwiazda (2003) – Archibald (voice)
- Emilia (2005) – Indiana Dżones
- Ja wam pokażę! (2006) – Tomasz Leon Kozłowski – Ex-husband of Judyta, Father of Tosia
- Oficerowie (2006, TV Mini-Series) – Marek Sznajder
- Lejdis (2008) – Narrator (voice)
- Złoty środek (2009) – Stefan
- Skrzydlate świnie (2010) – Krzysztof Dzikowski
- Piotrek Trzynastego (2010) – Ranger
- Belcanto (2010) – Mariusz Marzeda
- Weekend (2010)
- Sztos 2 (2012) – Synek
- Felix, Net i Nika oraz teoretycznie możliwa katastrofa (2012) – Manfred (voice)
- Antyterapia (2014) – Marecki
- Bangistan (2015) – Tom
- Złote krople (2016) – Chancellor (voice)
- Saga o trzech prawiczkach (2017) – Father
- Volta (2017) - Dabrowszczak Jędrek / Złotousty
- Papierowe gody (2017) – Therapist
- Pitbull. Ostatni pies (2018) – 'Gawron'
- 7 uczuć (2018) – Friend
- Diablo. Ultimate Race (2019) – Jarosz
- Kurier (2019) – Tenant
- Futro z misia (2019) – 'Dzik'
- Psy 3: W imię zasad (2020) – Waldemar Morawiec 'Nowy'
- Możesz być kim chcesz (2020) – Guest
- Maszyna losująca
- Operation: Nation (2022)
- Sexify (2021–2023) – Marek Nowicki, Monika's father

== Discography ==
- Płyta stereofoniczna (1999)
