= Olaf Lubaszenko =

Polish actor and film director (born 1968)

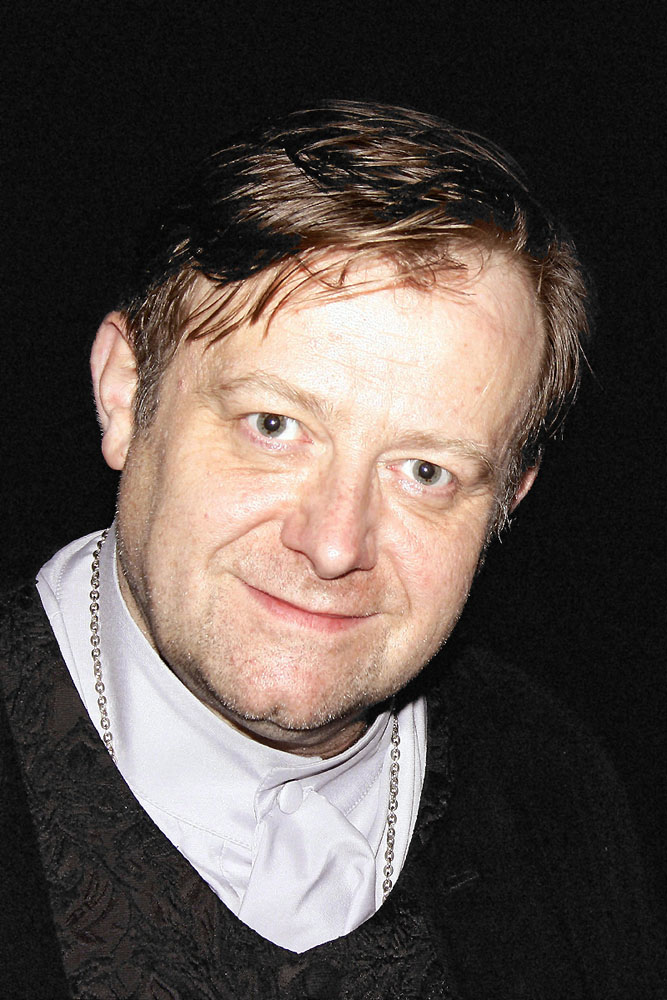
- Olaf Lubaszenko
- Born: 6 December 1968 (age 57); Wrocław, Poland
- Occupations: Actor, film director
- Years active: 1982 - present

Olaf Sergiusz Linde-Lubaszenko (born 6 December 1968) is a Polish actor and film director.

== Biography ==
He was born in Wrocław, the son of actors Edward Linde-Lubaszenko and Asja Łamtiugina.

Olaf Lubaszenko starred in films by Krzysztof Kieślowski, Barbara Sass, Władysław Pasikowski, Janusz Majewski, Juliusz Machulski and others. In 1999, he received the Polish Academy Award for Best Actor for his role in the film Zabić Sekala.

In 2001, he became a member of the European Film Academy.

== Selected filmography ==
=== Actor ===
- 1987: Łuk Erosa - Adam Karowski
- 1988: Sonata marymoncka - Rysiek Lewandowski
- 1988: Trójkąt bermudzki - Poker Player (uncredited)
- 1988: Tabu - Stefek
- 1988: Bez grzechu - Jarek Kalita
- 1988: A Short Film About Love - Tomek
- 1990: Pilkarski poker - Olek Grom
- 1989: Czarny wawóz - Ludwik Machl
- 1990: Marcowe migdały - Tomek
- 1990: Korczak - Tramwajarz
- 1990: Historia niemoralna - Marek
- 1990: Po upadku - Piotr Ratajczak, son
- 1991: Kroll - Marcin Kroll
- 1992: Odjazd - Priest
- 1992: Pigs - Young
- 1993: Pamietnik znaleziony w garbie
- 1993: Schindler's List - Auschwitz Guard #1
- 1994: Les Amoureux - Tomek
- 1995: Gnoje - Gasior
- 1996: Słodko gorzki - Mat's Brother
- 1996: Wirus
- 1996: Poznań '56 - Soldier
- 1997: Sztos - Mietek
- 1997: Kiler - Actor at Airport
- 1997: Zona przychodzi noca
- 1998: Demons of War - Lt. Czacki
- 1998: Sekal Has to Die - Jura Baran
- 1999: A Szerencse lányai - Janek
- 1999: Operacja Samum - Stanislaw Kosinski
- 1999: Moja Angelika - Kulik
- 1999: Kilerów 2-óch - Himself
- 2000: Zakochani - Prawnik
- 2000: Operacja Koza - Adam Horn
- 2000: Pierwszy milion - Priest
- 2000: Egoiści - Sad
- 2000: Bajland - Józef Horoszko
- 2001: Edges of the Lord - Gniecio
- 2001: Stacja - Commissioner Zawadzki
- 2002: Tam i z powrotem - Lt. Niewczas
- 2002: Rób swoje, ryzyko jest twoje - Emil Baks
- 2002: E=mc2 - Max Kadzielski
- 2002: Bez litosci - Olbrycht
- 2003: Magiczna Gwiazda - Hubert (voice)
- 2009: Złoty środek - Keyboarder
- 2009: Mniejsze zło - Civilian
- 2011: Weekend - Czeski
- 2012: Sztos 2 - Mietek
- 2016: Bóg w Krakowie - Homeless
- 2017: Gwiazdy - Czechoslovak customs officer
- 2018: Women of Mafia - Commander
- 2022: Hellhole – Prior Andrzej
- 2024: Justice – Tadeusz Gadacz

=== Director ===
- 1997: Sztos
- 2000: Chłopaki nie płaczą
- 2001: Poranek Kojota
- 2002: E=mc2
- 2009: Złoty środek
- 2012: Sztos 2

=== Polish dubbing ===
- 2003: Finding Nemo - Gill
- 2004: Les Dalton (Les Dalton) - Lucky Luke
- 2007: Lissi und der wilde Kaiser - Yeti
- 2008: Beverly Hills Chihuahuas - Delgado
- 2013: Wreck-It Ralph - Wreck-It Ralph
- 2011: Beverly Hills Chihuahua - Delgado
- 2014: Guardians of the Galaxy - Denarian Saal
- 2016: Finding Dory - Gill
- 2018: Ralph Breaks the Internet - Wreck-It Ralph
