= The Poison Tasters =

1995 film

- Directed by: Ulrik Theer
- Written by: Tom V. Bierce
- Produced by: Hong Ting; Tom V. Bierce
- Starring: Karolina A. Rosinska; French Stewart; Veerland Thomas Bierce; Aga Lange
- Cinematography: Pawel Edelman
- Edited by: Petr Sitár
- Release date: 1995
- Running time: 95 minutes
- Country: United States
- Languages: English; Polish

The Poison Tasters is a 1995 American drama film directed by Ulrik Theer. It was screened in the Un Certain Regard section at the 1995 Cannes Film Festival.

== Cast ==
- Karolina A. Rosinska - Ana
- Tom V. Bierce - Georg
- Veerland Thomas Bierce - Georg
- Barbara Dzido-Lelinska - Landlady
- Marek Kasprzyk - Officer
- Krzysztof Kumor - Professor Mirek
- Ewelina Kuropatwa - Marta
- Aga Lange - Aga
- Maciek Maciejewski - Szymek
- Cezary Pazura - Soldier
- Julitta Sekiewicz-Kisiel - Mrs. Mirek
- French Stewart - Crawford
