= Bogusław Linda =

Polish actor and singer

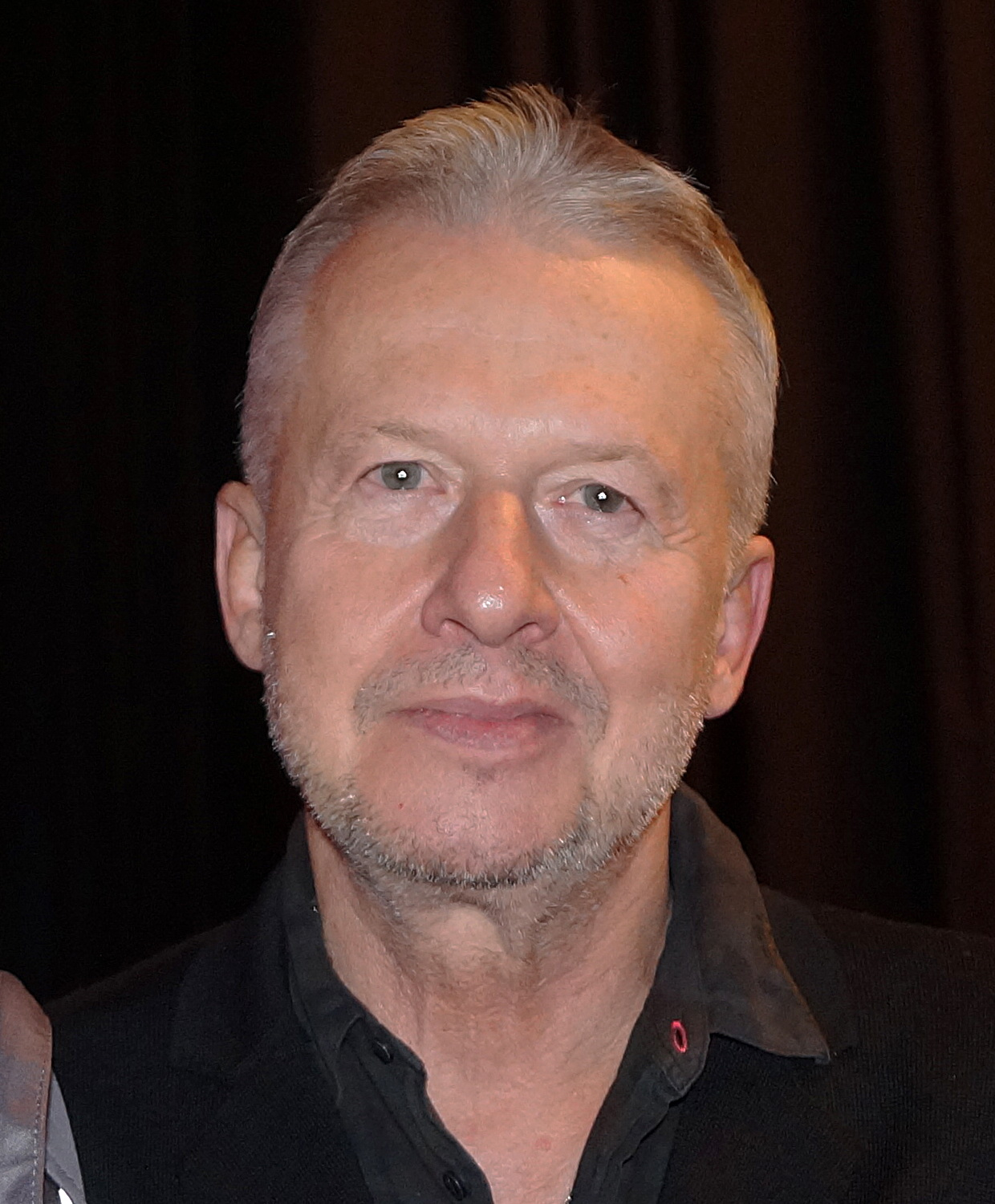
- Linda in 2018
- Born: 27 June 1952 (age 74); Toruń, Republic of Poland
- Education: Ludwik Solski Academy for the Dramatic Arts
- Years active: 1973–present
- Spouse(s): 1. unknown (divorced); 2. Lidia Popiel
- Children: 3 (2 sons, 1 daughter)
- Musical career
- Genres: Sung poetry
- Instrument: Vocals
- Label: Universal Music Poland

Signature
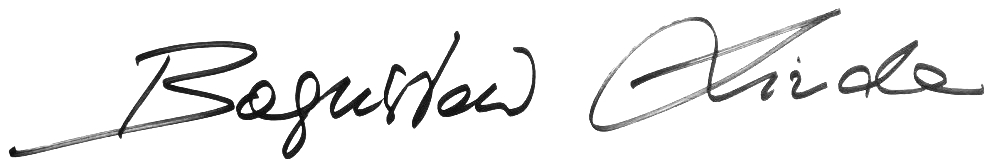

Bogusław Linda (Polish: [bɔˈɡuswaf ˈlinda]; born 27 June 1952) is a Polish actor known from films such as Psy and Tato. He appeared in Andrzej Wajda's Man of Iron and Danton and in Krzysztof Kieślowski's Blind Chance and the seventh episode of Kieślowski's Dekalog. He is regarded as one of the most popular Polish film actors.

== Biography ==
He was born on 27 June 1952 in Toruń, where he graduated from the Secondary School of General Education. He graduated from the Secondary School in Toruń and is a graduate of the Krakow Academy of Dramatic Arts and a co-founder and lecturer at Warsaw Film School.

As a student, Linda made contact with Kraków's Stary Teatr. His debut was as Mikolka in Fyodor Dostoevsky's Crime and Punishment, directed by Maciej Prus, 1977. From 1978 through 1981 he worked at the Wrocławski Teatr Współczesny in such plays as Thomas Mann's The Magic Mountain and Kafka's Amerika (1980). In the early 1980s he was an actor in Warsaw's Studio Theatre.

His first major role came in 1980 with the Polish film Fever, directed by Agnieszka Holland, in which he portrayed an anarchist named Gryziaka. Then followed roles in the films: A Lonely Woman (1981) by the same director; Man of Iron by Andrzej Wajda; Blind Chance by director Krzysztof Kieślowski (1981); and The Mother of Kings by Janusz Zaorski (1982) – all roles of characters marked by existential anxiety, and forced to struggle hopelessly against a hostile reality.

Linda had a breakthrough role in the Jacek Bromski film, Kill Me, Cop (1987), playing George Malik, a dangerous criminal. In 1992, he starred as Franz Maurer in Pigs by director Władysław Pasikowski. This role shaped the image of Linda as a cynical "tough guy", an image strengthened by roles in the films Pigs 2: The Last Blood (reprising the role of Franz Maurer), Sara by Maciej Ślesicki, A Trap by Adek Drabiński, and Demons of War by Władysław Pasikowski. In the film Sara, the actor performed a cover of Leonard Cohen's song "I'm Your Man".

The 90s brought him critical acclaim with roles in Jan Jakub Kolski's Johnnie Waterman (1994) (also known as Johnnie the Aquarius); as Michał Sulecki, a father fighting for custody of his 7-year-old daughter in Tato, directed by Maciej Ślesicki (1995); and as Father Robak, a priest, in Pan Tadeusz: The Last Foray in Lithuania by Andrzej Wajda (1999). In 1996, during the Festival of Stars in Misdroy left a hand mark on the Promenade of Stars.

In 2001's Reich, directed by Władysław Pasikowski, he played Alex, a gangster, alongside Mirosław Baka and Aleksandra Nieśpielak. It was the seventh production in which Linda worked with director Pasikowski, after which he began trying to escape from the image of a tough guy with a gun in his hand. In the fall of 2002, he hosted the talk show Co ty wiesz o gotowaniu, czyli Linda w kuchni. The show was pulled from the schedule after six episodes due to low viewership scores.

In the same year he also starred as Petronius in Jerzy Kawalerowicz's Quo Vadis. On the Polish cinema screens also entered his second season on the bream. The actor played the role of a cop whose wife left. It was also a road movie about a young offender who attacked the bank. Main Roles played with him Anna Przybylska, Gabriel Fleszar, Edyta Olszówka and Marian Dziędziel.

In 2005, he starred in the Polish-American production of Summer Love. In the same year he recorded with the band Fireflies an album titled Las putas melancólicas. He played a comedic role in the film Time Surfers and starred in sitcoms and Wilds 2: Duel.

In 2006 Linda tried his hand as a director with the film Skylights, a story about two young girls whose lives are intertwined with the difficult economic situation in Poland after the fall of communism.

Three years later, Linda proved himself as a comedic actor in the film Blind Date, directed by Wojciech Wojcik. Linda played the role of seducer Cezary there.

On 5 October 2009 at the hands of the Secretary of State in the Ministry of Culture, Piotr Żuchowski, he picked up a Silver Medal Gloria Artis.

On 1 April 2011 the film Three minutes by Maciej Ślesicki was released, where he played the role of a painter.

On 19 April 2012 he directed Merlin his Mongol. It was his theatre directorial debut, and the first time he had been involved with the theatre in 15 years.

On 16 May 2014 he was awarded the Officer's Cross of the Order of Polonia Restituta "for outstanding services for Polish culture, for achievements in artistic and creative work, and social activity".

He was honoured in the Walk of Fame in his hometown of Toruń (where he studied and lived), where d the second in a series of "katarzynki" – signatures of famous inhabitants of Toruń was unveiled in the old town.

== Private life ==
He is married to photographer and model Lidia Popiel. He and his friend Maciej Ślesicki founded the Warsaw Film School, one of the first privately owned schools for actors in Poland. He is concerned about his privacy and rarely gives interviews or consents to articles about his private life. He has expressed his support for the LGBT community and has taken part in the "Side by Side Towards Equality" initiative launched by the Campaign Against Homophobia. He is passionate about horseback riding and hunting.

== Selected filmography ==
- Wodzirej (Top Dog) (1978)
- Fever (1981)
- Man of Iron (1981)
- Przypadek (Blind Chance) (1981)
- Dreszcze (1981)
- Danton (1983)
- Eskimo Woman Feels Cold (Eskimosce jest zimno) (1983; Hungarian film directed by János Xantus, original title: Eszkimó asszony fázik)
- Flowers of Reverie (1984)
- Magnat (1987) - won award
- The Mother of Kings (1987)
- Dekalog (The Decalogue) (1989)
- Psy (Dogs) (1992)
- All That Really Matters (1992)
- Jańcio Wodnik (Johnnie the Aquarius) (1993)
- Pigs 2: The Last Blood (1994)
- Szamanka (The Shaman) (1996)
- A Trap (1997)
- Sara (1997)
- Zabić Sekala (Sekal Has to Die) (1998)
- Pan Tadeusz (1999)
- Quo Vadis (2001)
- I kto tu rządzi? (2007)
- Kajínek (2010)
- Battle of Warsaw 1920 (2011)
- Afterimage (2016)
- The Thaw (2022)

== Discography ==
=== Albums ===
Title	Album details	Peak chart positions
Title	Album details	POL
Las putas melancólicas with Świetliki	Released: 26 September 2005; Label: Universal Music Poland; Formats: CD, digital download	7
"—" denotes a recording that did not chart or was not released in that territory.

=== Music videos ===
Title	Year	Album	Ref.
"Gdzie mam szukać cię" with Assia Akhat	2002	non-album single	
"Filandia"	2005	Las putas melancólicas	
