= Artur Żmijewski (actor) =

Polish movie and stage actor (born 1966)

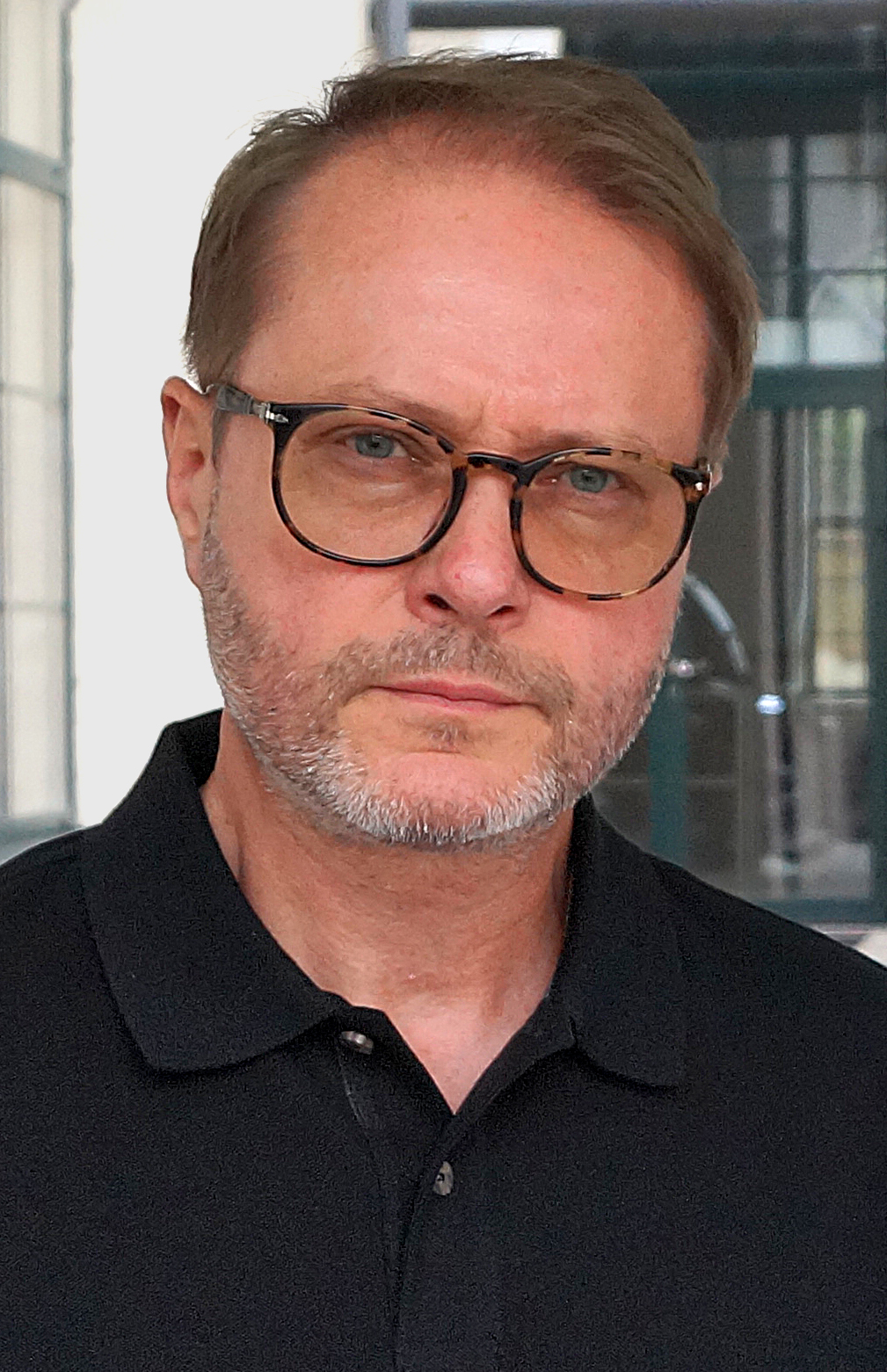
- Żmijewski in 2018
- Born: 10 April 1966 (age 60); Radzymin, Poland
- Education: Aleksander Zelwerowicz National Academy of Dramatic Art
- Children: 3
- Honors: Goodwill Ambassador for UNICEF; Honorary citizen of Legionowo

Artur Żmijewski (born 10 April 1966) is a Polish film and stage actor.

== Biography ==
Born in Radzymin, Żmijewski graduated from the M. Konopnickiej High School in Legionowo, and then in 1990 from the Theatre Academy in Warsaw.

In 1989–1991 he performed with the Contemporary Theatre (Teatr Współczesny), in 1991–1992 at the Ateneum Theatre and Theatre Scene Presentations (Teatr Scena Prezentacje), and in 1998–2010 he appeared at the National Theatre (all in Warsaw).

Since 2007 he has been a national Goodwill Ambassador for UNICEF. Since 2009 he has been an honorary citizen of Legionowo.

He has a wife Paulina and three children Ewa (born 1993), Karol (born 2000), and Wiktor (born 2002).

== Filmography ==
- 1984 Dzień czwarty as Insurgent
- 1986 Złota mahmudia as Mitko, The Fisherman
- 1989 A Tale of Adam Mickiewicz's 'Forefathers' Eve' as Gustaw / Konrad
- 1989 Ostatni dzwonek as Jackowski
- 1989 Inventory as Tomasz
- 1990 Napoleon as Writer of Napoleon
- 1990 Escape from the 'Liberty' Cinema as Krzysztof, Ex-Husband of The Censor
- 1991 3 dni bez wyroku as Adam 'Mruk' Niedzicki
- 1991 Ferdydurke (30 door key) as Kopyrda
- 1991–1992 Kim był Joe Luis, as Maciek, Joniego's Friend
- 1991 Panny i Wdowy as Father Bradecki, Exiled Priest In Siberia
- 1992 Enak as Reporter
- 1992 Pigs as Radosław Wolf, An Arms Dealer
- 1994 Psy II: Ostatnia krew as Radosław Wolf
- 1994 Blood of the Innocent as Detective Marty Wusharksky
- 1994 Wyliczanka as Adam, Artur's Father
- 1995 Daleko od siebie as Marcin Borowski
- 1995 Ekstradycja as Wiesiek Cyrk
- 1995 Gnoje as Czesiek
- 1995 Za co? as Józef Migurski
- 1996 Deszczowy żołnierz as Jerzy, Anny's Husband
- 1996 Słodko gorzki as Adam
- 1996 Escape from Recsk as Gyula Molnar
- 1997 Gniew as Paweł
- 1997 Przystań as Rafał, Colleague of Jana
- 1998 13 posterunek as Santa Claus
- 1998 Amok as Broker
- 1998 Demons of War as Biniek
- 1998 Matki, żony i kochanki as Piotr Rafalik, Tennis Player
- 1998 Złoto dezerterów as Lieutenant Pet
- 1998 Żona przychodzi nocą
- 1999–2012 Na dobre i na złe as Dr. Jakub Burski (episodes 1–472)
- 1999 Headquarters: Warsaw as Karol
- 1999 Ostatnia misja as Deputy Inspector Krzysztof Myszkowski
- 1999 Pierwszy milion (TV series) as Piotr Leja
- 2000 Pierwszy milion as Likwidator
- 2000 Wyrok na Franciszka Kłosa as Aschel
- 2001 In Desert and Wilderness as Władysław Tarkowski, the father of Staś
- 2001 Miś Kolabo as Lieutenant
- 2002 Sfora as Roman Kruk, New Collaborator with Olbrychta
- 2004 Ławeczka as Piotr Kot
- 2004 Nigdy w życiu! as Adam
- 2006 Bezmiar sprawiedliwości as Jerzy Kuter
- 2006 Bezmiar sprawiedliwości (TV series) as Jerzy Kuter
- 2006 Fałszerze – powrót Sfory as Roman Kruk
- 2006 Just Love Me as Adam
- 2006 We're All Christs
- 2007 Katyń as Andrzej, Captain of The 8th Cavalry Regiment
- 2007 Odwróceni as Sub-Inspector Paweł Sikora
- 2007 Świadek koronny as Sub-Inspector Paweł Sikora
- 2008 Złodziej w sutannie as Father Wójcik
- 2008 Ojciec Mateusz as Father Mateusz Żmigrodzki
- 2010 Mała matura 1947 as Tadeusz Taschke, Ludwik's Father
- 2012 My Father's Bike as Paweł
- 2013 Oszukane as Father of Twins
- 2014 Kamienie na szaniec as Stanisław Bytnar, Father of Jana Bytnara, aka "Rudy"
- 2016 Pitbull. Niebezpieczne Kobiety as Szelka
- 2017 Breaking the Limits as Jerzy's Father

== Polish dubbing ==
- 1973: Robin Hood, as Robin Hood
- 2000: The Road to El Dorado, as Tulio
- 2001: In Desert and Wilderness, as Władysław Tarkowski
- 2005: Madagascar, as the lion Alex
- 2005: Karol: A Man Who Became Pope, as Hans Frank
- 2005: Pope John Paul II, as a friend
- 2007: Donkey Xote, as Don Quichote de La Mancha
- 2007: Enchanted, as Robert
- 2008: Madagascar: Escape 2 Africa, as the lion Alex
- 2010: Merry Madagascar, as the lion Alex
- 2012: Madagascar 3: Europe's Most Wanted, as the lion Alex
- 2014: Mr. Peabody & Sherman, as Mr Peabody

== Awards ==
- 1989 – Viareggio (MFF) "Platinum Award" for best actor in the film Stan posiadania
- 1990 – Nagroda Szefa Kinematografii for filmmaking in the field of feature films for the movie Lawa
- 1991 – FPFF Gdynia, nomination for lead actor in the film 3 dni bez wyroku
- 1992 – Zbigniew Cybulski Award
- 2001 – The "Telekamera" in the actors category (the prize is awarded by the readers of the "Tele Tydzień" TV magazine)
- 2002 – The "Telekamera" in the actors category
- 2002 – The "Telemaska" best actor television/theatre for the 2001/2002 season
- 2003 – The "Telekamera" in the actors category
- 2003 – The "Telemaska" best actor television/theatre for the 2002/2003 season
- 2003 – "Stefan Treugutta Award" for a theater performance in "Edward II"
- 2003 – "Viva Najpiękniejsi Award" granted by the readers of "Viva!" magazine
- 2004 – "Golden Telekamera" prize
- 2005 – Golden Cross of Merit
- 2010 – "Wiktora 2009" award for the most popular actor on television
- 2011 – "Telekamera 2011" for the Ojciec Mateusz TV series, in which he plays the leading role
