= Edward Linde-Lubaszenko =

Polish actor (1939–2026)

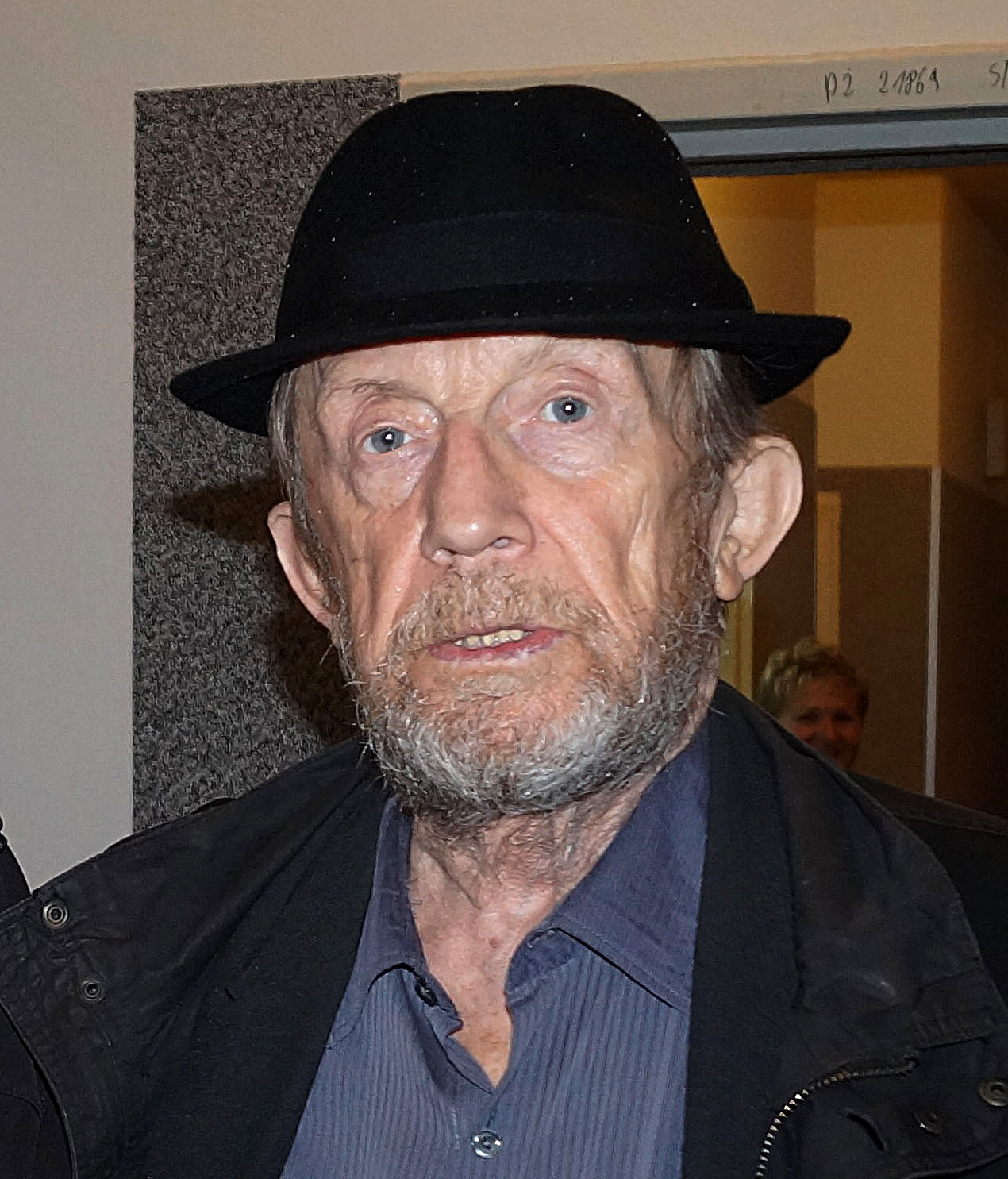
- Linde-Lubaszenko in 2017
- Born: 23 August 1939; Białystok, Poland
- Died: 8 February 2026 (aged 86)
- Education: AST National Academy of Theatre Arts in Kraków
- Occupation: Actor

Edward Linde-Lubaszenko (23 August 1939 – 8 February 2026) was a Polish actor. He was widely known for his roles in Psy (1992), Kroll (1991), and the television series Układ krążenia (2017). Over a career spanning more than five decades, he was recognised for his distinctive character roles in Polish cinema and television.

== Life and career ==
His father, Julian Linde, was a German of Swedish descent, who escaped from Białystok in 1939. Edward's mother, who was an ethnic Pole, refused to follow him to Germany. She met Mikołaj Lubaszenko, a Soviet officer with whom she moved to Arkhangelsk, where they got married. The young actor was raised as Edward Lubaszenko by his mother and her husband. He found that he was Linde's son when he was about 18 years old. He changed his name to Edward Linde-Lubaszenko in 1991.

Linde-Lubaszenko had his debut in 1964 at the Polish Theatre in Wrocław. In the 1960s he studied medicine but eventually graduated from Ludwik Solski Academy for the Dramatic Arts in Kraków in 1977.

He was married four times. He was the father of the Polish actor Olaf Lubaszenko and Beata Linde-Lubaszenko.

Linde-Lubaszenko died on 8 February 2026, at the age of 86.

== Filmography ==
- Artyści (TV series, 2016), as Marek Popieł, porter
