= Władysław Pasikowski =

Polish film director and screenwriter (born 1959)

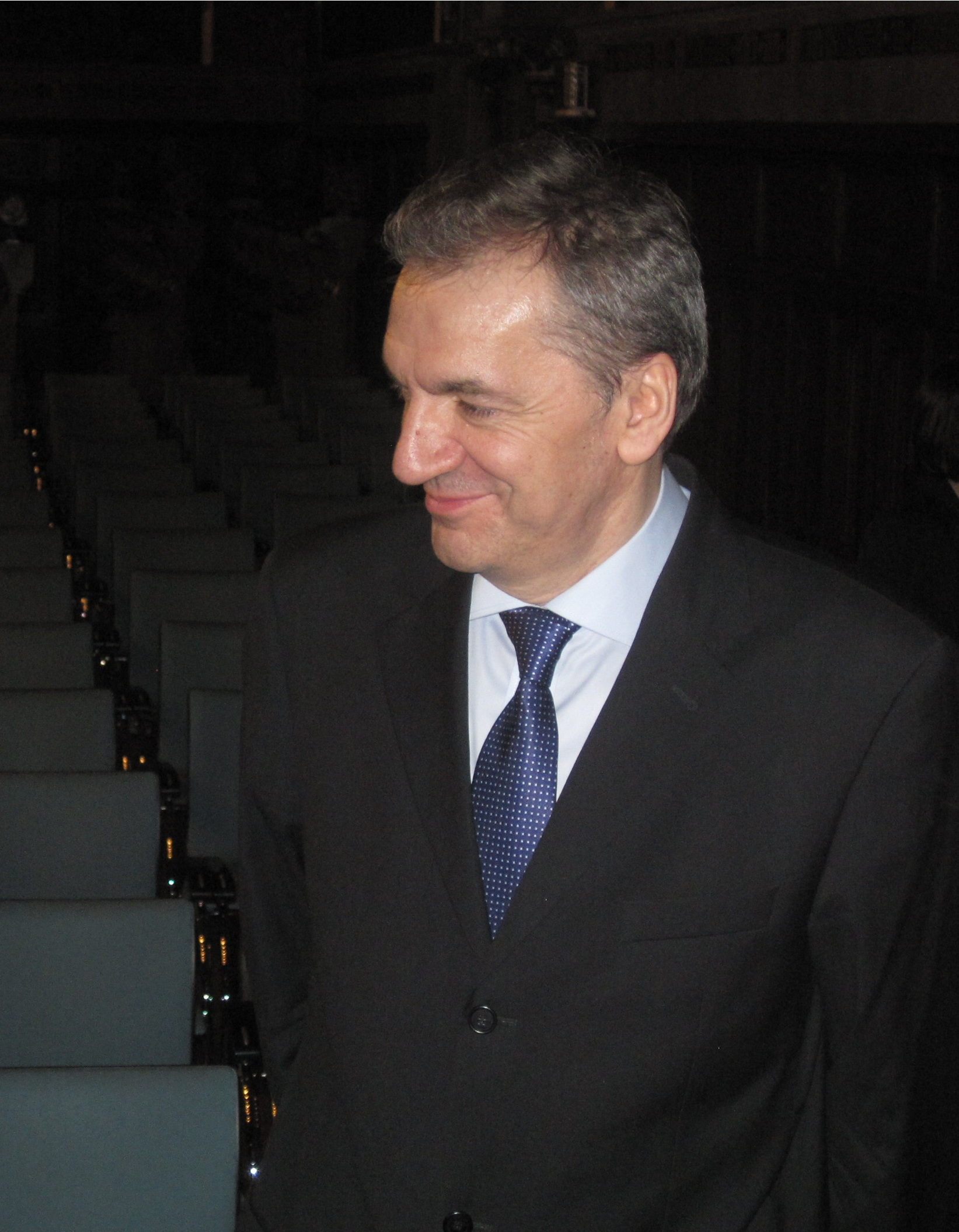
Pasikowski in 2014

Władysław Pasikowski (Polish pronunciation: [vwaˈdɨswaf paɕiˈkɔfskʲi]; born 14 June 1959 in Łódź, Poland) is a Polish film director and screenwriter.

He made his debut film, Kroll, in 1991, which was honored with the Polish Film Festival prize for his debut and the Special Jury Prize. Pasikowski is also the author of the science fiction novel I, Gelerth (Ja, Gelerth (Zebra)) which in 1993 was nominated for the Janusz A. Zajdel Award.

== Filmography ==
- Kroll (1991)
- Psy (1992)
- Psy II: Ostatnia krew (1994)
- Słodko gorzki (1996)
- Demons of War (1998)
- Operacja Samum (1999)
- Reich (2001)
- Glina (2003–2004)
- Maszyna losująca (2007)
- Aftermath (2012) The story is loosely based on a pogrom which took place in Jedwabne in German-occupied north eastern Poland in July 1941. Two brothers attempt "to break the conspiracy of silence among the residents of the village where the massacre had taken place". Starring Maciej Stuhr as Jozek. Met with negative commentary alleging fabrications and anti-polonism, which in turn led to allegations of anti-semitism of its critics, and praise for the director and actor for approaching the topic in Poland when it opened.
- Jack Strong (2014) about Ryszard Kukliński
- Pitbull. Ostatni pies (2018)
- Kurier, also titled The Resistance Fighter (2019) about Jan Nowak-Jeziorański
- Psy 3 (2020)
