= Ryszard Kotys =

Polish actor (1932–2021)

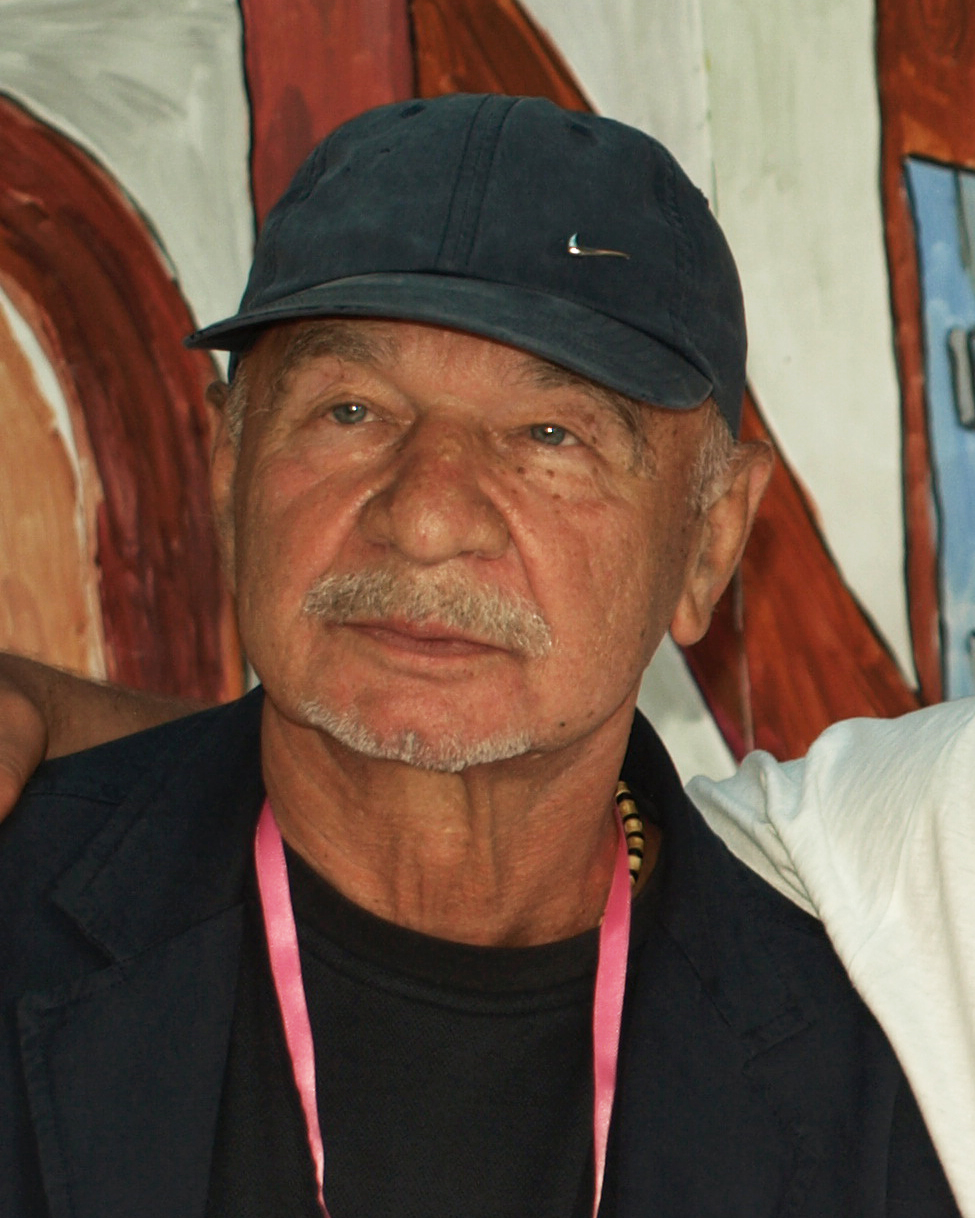
- Ryszard Kotys in 2009
- Born: 20 March 1932; Mniów, Poland
- Died: 27 January 2021 (aged 88); Poznań, Poland
- Occupation: Actor
- Years active: 1953–2021

Ryszard Kotys (20 March 1932 – 27 January 2021) was a Polish actor. He appeared in more than 140 films and television shows during his career.

== Filmography ==
=== Film ===
Year	Title	Role	Director
1954	A Generation	Jacek	Andrzej Wajda
1955	Trzy starty	Edek, sparing partner Walczaka	Czesław Petelski
1956	Zemsta	Hajduk	Antoni Bohdziewicz, Bohdan Korzeniewski
1958	Pigułki dla Aurelii	Boy at the Florist	Stanisław Lenartowicz
1961	Milczące ślady	Stusina	Zbigniew Kuźmiński
1962	Na białym szlaku	Meteorologist Bjorn	Jarosław Brzozowski
1962	Dziewczyna z dobrego domu	Man	Antoni Bohdziewicz
1964	The Saragossa Manuscript	Servant	Wojciech Jerzy Has
1964	Panienka z okienka	Sailor	Maria Kaniewska
1964	Agnieszka 46	Semen	Sylwester Chęciński
1964	Awatar, czyli zamiana dusz	Butler	Janusz Majewski
1965	Potem nastąpi cisza	Soldier	Janusz Morgenstern
1965	Sobótki	Guard	Paweł Komorowski
1966	Katastrofa	Militiaman	Sylwester Chęciński
1966	Ściana Czarownic	Skier Ryszard Parzaniec	Paweł Komorowski
1966	Bumerang	Witness	Leon Jeannot
1967	Skok	Farmer	Kazimierz Kutz
1967	Sami swoi	Cat Owner	Sylwester Chęciński
1967	Poczmistrz	Kola	Stanisław Lenartowicz
1967	Morderca zostawia ślad	Worker	Aleksander Ścibor-Rylski
1968	Wilcze echa	Soldier	Aleksander Ścibor-Rylski
1968	Molo	Andrzej's Colleague	Wojciech Solarz
1968	The Doll	Bidder	Wojciech Jerzy Has
1969	Znaki na drodze	Mechanic Bulaga	Andrzej Piotrowski
1969	Tylko umarły odpowie	Marcin Parkosz	Sylwester Chęciński
1969	Ostatni świadek	Prisoner	Jan Batory
1969	Jarzębina czerwona	Soldier (cast dubbed by Józef Nowak)	Ewa Petelska, Czesław Petelski
1969	Czerwone i złote	Antoni Zapieralski	Stanisław Lenartowicz
1971	Wezwanie	Edward, Zośka's Brother	Wojciech Solarz
1971	Trąd	Strzałka	Andrzej Trzos-Rastawiecki
1971	Piżama	Jadwiga's Brother	Antoni Krauze
1971	Pierwsza miłość	Białobzorow	Sylwester Chęciński
1971	Nos	Hairdresser	Stanisław Lenartowicz
1971	Bolesław Śmiały	Killed Man	Witold Lesiewicz
1972	Uciec jak najbliżej	Deputy Manager	Janusz Zaorski
1972	Fortuna	Ważych	Helena Amiradżibi-Stawińska
1973	Zasieki	Józek	Andrzej Piotrowski
1973	Stracona noc	Stanisław	Janusz Majewski
1973	Nagrody i odznaczenia	Patient	Jan Łomnicki
1974	Opowieść w czerwieni	Sacrist	Henryk Kluba
1975	Strach	Bogutek	Antoni Krauze
1976	Niedzielne dzieci	Andrzej Bilski	Agnieszka Holland
1977	Wodzirej	Kazik	Feliks Falk
1978	Provincial Actors	Majchrzak	Agnieszka Holland
1978	Szpital przemienienia	Male Nurse Józek	Edward Żebrowski
1979	Wolne chwile	Carpenter	Andrzej Barański
1979	Bezpośrednie połączenie	Taxi Driver	Juliusz Machulski
1979	Ojciec królowej	Servant	Wojciech Solarz
1979	Operacja Himmler	Prisoner	Zbigniew Chmielewski
1979	Lekcja martwego języka	Guard of prisoners	Janusz Majewski
1979	Golem	Elevator without a hand	Piotr Szulkin
1980	Ballada o Januszku	Dogcatcher	Ryszard Zatorski
1980	Olympics 40	Schlappke	Andrzej Kotkowski
1980	Panienki	patient	Jarosław Kusza
1980	Przed odlotem	Skowron	Krzysztof Rogulski
1981	Vabank	Melski	Juliusz Machulski
1981	Amnestia	Militiaman	Stanisław Jędryka
1981	Dreszcze	Guard	Wojciech Marczewski
1981	A Lonely Woman	Władek	Agnieszka Holland
1981	On, ona, oni	Assesor	Andrzej Melin
1981	Wielka majówka	Father	Krzysztof Rogulski
1981	Wielki bieg	Judge	Jerzy Domaradzki
1981	Wolny strzelec	Labus	Wiesław Saniewski
1982	Wilczyca	Oleksiak	Marek Piestrak
1982	Wyjście awaryjne	Porter	Roman Załuski
1982	Wielki Szu	Sharp	Sylwester Chęciński
1982	Niech cię odleci mara	Storekeeper	Andrzej Barański
1982	Klakier	Mr. Kazio	Janusz Kondratiuk
1983	Szkatułka z Hongkongu	Kupke	Paweł Pitera
1983	Piętno	Ostler	Ryszard Czekała
1983	To tylko Rock	Director of a cultural center	Paweł Karpiński
1983	Dzień kolibra	Caretaker	Ryszard Rydzewski
1983	Lata dwudzieste... lata trzydzieste...	Coach	Janusz Rzeszewski
1984	Vabank II, czyli riposta	Melski	Juliusz Machulski
1984	Wszystko powiem Lilce	Man	Wiktor Skrzynecki
1984	O-Bi, O-Ba: The End of Civilization	Celulozowy	Piotr Szulkin
1984	Romans z intruzem	Matula	Waldemar Podgórski
1985	Och, Karol	Train Conductor	Roman Załuski
1985	Sezon na bażanty	Consul	Wiesław Saniewski
1985	Sam pośród swoich	Terpichowski	Wojciech Wójcik
1985	Okruchy wojny	Szaruga	Jan Chodkiewicz, Andrzej Barszczyński
1985	List gończy	Receptionist	Stanislav Strnad
1986	Złoty pociąg	Nowak	Bohdan Poręba
1986	Rykowisko	Jamróz	Grzegorz Skurski
1986	Hero of the Year	Kazik	Feliks Falk
1987	Kingsajz	Nosacz	Juliusz Machulski
1987	Trójkąt bermudzki	Wacek	Wojciech Wójcik
1987	Sonata marymoncka	Man	Jerzy Ridan
1988	Kogel-mogel	Postman	Roman Załuski
1988	Koniec	Guard	Bogusław Linda
1988	Dotknięci	Worker	Wiesław Saniewski
1989	Powrót wabiszczura	Szczur	Zbigniew Rebzda
1989	Konsul	The secretary of party	Mirosław Bork
1989	Deja vu	Coppola, gangster z Chicago	Juliusz Machulski
1990	Life for Life: Maximilian Kolbe	Carbon's Thief	Krzysztof Zanussi
1990	Zakład	Guard	Teresa Kotlarczyk
1990	Piggate	Simpson	Krzysztof Magowski
1990	Seszele	Driver	Bogusław Linda
1990	Powrót wilczycy	Inspector	Marek Piestrak
1990	Kramarz	Zygmunt	Andrzej Barański
1991	Calls Controlled	ZOMO Officer	Sylwester Chęciński
1991	V.I.P.	Policeman	Juliusz Machulski
1991	Dzieci wojny	Miller	Krzysztof Rogulski
1992	A Bachelor's Life Abroad	Inspector in Factory	Andrzej Barański
1993	Przypadek Pekosińskiego	Chessplayer Rysio	Grzegorz Królikiewicz
1994	Dogs 2: The last blood	Machinist	Władysław Pasikowski
1995	Dzieje mistrza Twardowskiego	Devil Field Marshal	Krzysztof Gradowski
1995	Kamień na kamieniu	Peasant	Ryszard Ber
2000	Czy można się przysiąść	Waiter	Tomasz Tryzna
2000	Sezon na leszcza	Guy	Bogusław Linda
2001	The Hexer	Centurion	Marek Brodzki
2002	Eukaliptus	Sony’s Father	Marcin Krzyształowicz
2005	The Nutcracker and the Mouseking	The Mouse King (voice, Polish dub)	Krzysztof Staroń (Polish dub)
2009	Handlarz cudów	Head of the Nursing Home	Jarosław Szoda, Bolesław Pawica
2010	Erratum	Father	Marek Lechki
2013	Tajemnica Westerplatte	Karol Szwedowski	Paweł Chochlew
2014	Gods	Member of the medical ethics committee	Łukasz Palkowski
2021	Klecha	Tailor	Jacek Gwizdała

=== Television ===
Year	Title	Role	Notes
1966–1970	Four Tank-Men and a Dog	Soviet Sapper	2 episodes
1968	Stawka większa niż życie	Wiehnert, British Agent	1 episode
1973	Droga	Jadwiga Sęk's Cousin	1 episode
1975	Trzecia granica	Commando	1 episode
1976	Znaki szczególne	Worker Gontek	2 episodes
1978	Ślad na ziemi	Driver Tobola	2 episodes
1979	W słońcu i w deszczu	Foreman Ludwik	3 episodes
1982	Popielec	Waluś	6 episodes
1982	Hotel Polan und seine Gäste	Paul Hasknecht	1 episode
1984	Rycerze i rabusie	Niezabitowski	1 episode
1984	Pan na Żuławach	Walenciak	Recurring role
1985	Przyłbice i kaptury	Kosooki	1 episode
1987	Ballada o Januszku	Dogcatcher	1 episode
1987	Ucieczka z miejsc ukochanych	Mayor Miazga	1 episode
1988	Akwen Eldorado	Ryszard Sznajder's Son	TV series
1989	Gdańsk 39	Gorontzek	TV series
1991	Pogranicze w ogniu	Captain	1 episode
1991	Panny i wdowy	Prisoner	1 episode
1993	Złoto Alaski	Chuck	1 episode
1994	Jest jak jest	Tadeusz Rozwadowski	2 episodes
1995	Sukces	Guard	1 episode
1999–2020	Świat według Kiepskich	Marian Paździoch	Main role
2000	O czym szumią kierpce	Grandfather	1 episode
2000	Dom	Patro	1 episode
2002	The Hexer	Centurion	1 episode
2003	Bao-Bab, czyli zielono mi	Baba	TV series
2007	Ekipa	Deputy Prime Minister Krzysztof Buczek	6 episodes
2007	Niania	Binderski	1 episode
2008	Hela w opałach	Caretaker	3 episodes
