= Janusz Michałowski =

Polish actor (1937–2026)

- Born: 1 January 1937; Augustów, Poland
- Died: 11 June 2026 (aged 89)
- Occupation: Actor
- Spouse: Izabella Cywińska

Janusz Michałowski (1 January 1937 – 11 June 2026) was Polish theatre and film actor.

== Life and career ==
Janusz Michałowski was born in Augustów on 1 January 1937. A graduate of the Grzegorz Piramowicz 1st High School in Augustów and the State Higher School of Theatre in Warsaw (1960). He worked in theatres in Koszalin, Toruń, the Wojciech Bogusławski Theatre in Kalisz (1969–1973), and Poznań. From 1990 he was an actor at the Ateneum Theatre in Warsaw, and from 1999 he was associated with the Contemporary Theatre.

He started his collaboration with the Television Theatre at an early age, where he played, among others: Korowiov in The Master and Margarita directed by Maciej Wojtyszko, , Baszmachkin in The Overcoat by Izabella Cywińska, Green-eyed Man in Close Supervision by Izabella Cywińska, Münchhausen in The Truthful Liar by M. Wojtyszka (first-degree award of the Chairman of the Committee for Radio and Television in 1979 and 1988), Torquemada in the play Darkness Covers, the Earth by I. Cywińska, Assolant in Paths of Glory by Jerzy Antczak. in Doctor Nock by and many others. He collaborated with the Polish Radio Theatre. He was the husband of the director Izabella Cywińska.

Michałowski died on 11 June 2026, at the age of 89.

== Filmography ==
Year	Title	Directed By	Role
1977	Ostatnie dni		Bitkow
1978	... gdziekolwiek jestes, panie prezydencie...		Doctor
1977	Zakret		Osadnik
1979	Nightmares		Waclaw Komenda
1980	Wizja lokalna 1901		Photographer
1980	The Palace	Tadeusz Junak	Jakub
1981	Przed matura		Tadeusz Macewicz
1981	Vabank	Juliusz Machulski	Commissioner Karelicki
1983	An Uneventful Story		Piotr
1983	Sexmission	Juliusz Machulski	Professor Wiktor Kuppelweiser
1984	Kartka z podrózy		Dawid's Father
1984	Synteza		Passer-by
1984	Pismak	Wojciech Jerzy Has	Doctor
1984	Jajo		Professor Augustyniak
1985	Memoirs of a Sinner (Written by Himself)	Wojciech Jerzy Has	
1986	Ognisty aniol		Hans - Asystent Fausta
1987	ESD		Fater
1987	Luk Erosa	Jerzy Domaradzki	Professor Kałucki
1988	Royal Dreams	Grzegorz Warchoł	Witold, Grand Duke of Lithuania, brother of Jagiełło
1989	Lawa	Tadeusz Konwicki	Father Piotr
1990	Swinka		Hans Weisenstein
1990	Bal na dworcu w Koluszkach		Rozbicki
1991	Polish cuisine		patron of Świątek
1991	Kobieta w ogrodzie		
1993	The Bank of the Otherworld		Nero (episode 8)
1994	Faustina: The Apostle of Divine Mercy		
1995	Stone on Stone	Ryszard Ber	Michał
1995	Berenika		Nieznajomy
1996	The Secret of Sagala		Archmage
1996	Bank nie z tej ziemi		Neron
1996	Przygody Joanny		
1997	Boża podszewka	Izabella Cywińska	Kazimierz Lulewicz
1998	Darmozjad polski		Father
1997–1998	Boza podszewka		
1998	13th Precinct		Miracle Worker (Ep. 39)
1998	Tydzien z zycia mezczyzny		
1999	A Week in the Life of a Man		Professor Marzycki
2000			
2000–2012	Plebania		Dr. Jakub Blumental
2003	The Magic Tree		Husky dog seller (ep. 1)
2004	Tydzien z zycia mezczyzny		
2004			
2009	Dancers		Antoni Rapacki
2009	Magiczne drzewo		
2010	Erratum		Policeman
2015	Prosecutor		police technician Henryk Skarżyński "Grandpa" (episodes 1–5)

== Theatre roles ==
- Papkin in Aleksander Fredro's Revenge
- Prisypkin in The Bedbug by Vladimir Mayakovsky (award at the festival in Katowice 1961)
- Tarielkin in The Death of Tarielkin by Aleksandr Suchowo-Kobylin (award at the festival in Toruń 1966)
- Sajetan in The Shoemakers by Stanisław Ignacy Witkiewicz (award at the festival in Kalisz 1971)
- The title role in Judas of Karioth by Karol Hubert Rostworowski (award at the festival in Kalisz 1981)
- Aslaksen in An Enemy of the People by Henrik Ibsen (award at the festival in Kalisz 1983)
- Fujarkiewicz in Michał Bałucki's Open House (award at the festival in Opole 1984)
- Felicjan Dulski in The Morality of Mrs. Dulska at the Television Theatre, directed by Tomasz Zygadło (1992)

== Awards ==
- Gold Cross of Merit (1984)
- Badge of the 1000th Anniversary of the Polish State (1965)
- Badge of Merit for Culture (1976)
- Badge of Honor of the City of Poznań (1987)
