= Machulski =

Machulski, feminine: Machulska is a Polish surname. Notable people with the surname include:

- Jan Machulski, Polish theater director and film and theatrical actor
- Juliusz Machulski, Polish film director, screenwriter, producer and actor
- Halina Machulska, Polish theater, film and television actress
