= Izabela Dąbrowska =

Polish actress and comedian (born 1966)

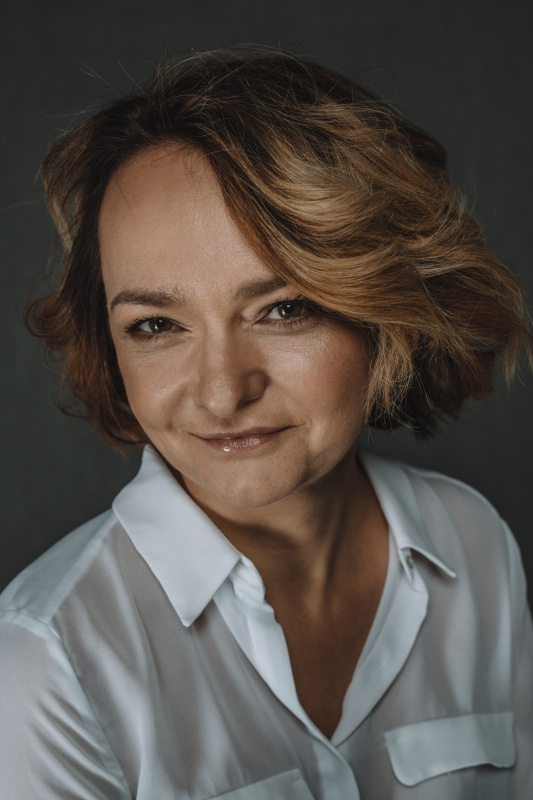
- Izabela Dąbrowska in 2018
- Born: 22 August 1966 (age 60); Białystok, Poland
- Education: Aleksander Zelwerowicz National Academy of Dramatic Art
- Occupations: Actor; Comedian
- Years active: 1990–present

Izabela Dąbrowska (Polish: [i.zaˈbɛ.la dɔmˈbrɔf.ska]; born 22 August 1966) is a Polish film, television, and stage actress and comedian. She is best known for the role of Mrs. Basia (based on Barbara Skrzypek) in television series The Chairman's Ear (2017–2019), and Jasiunia Rostworowska-Fus in Blondynka (2010, 2013–2021), as well as from films such as Mall Girls (2009), All Will Be Well (2007), Lullaby (2010), Three Minutes. 21:37 (2011), Ida (2013), Gods (2014), Afterimage (2016).

== Early life and education ==
Izabela Dąbrowska was born in Białystok, Poland. Until the age of three, she lived with her parents in their family home village of Kołodno. Later, they moved to the nearby city of Białystok.

She graduated from the Faculty of the Puppetry Art in Białystok, Poland, which is a branch of the Aleksander Zelwerowicz National Academy of Dramatic Art in Warsaw, Poland.

== Career ==
Dąbrowska began her career as a puppeteer, and later became a stage actress in 1990. From 1989 to 1990, she worked at the Lalka Theatre in Warsaw, from 1990 to 1991 at the Miniatura City Theatre in Gdańsk, in 1995 at the Dramatic Theatre in Warsaw, and in 1999 at the Tadeusz Łomnicki Wola Scene in Warsaw. Since 2005, she has been a member of the Laboratorium Dramatu of the Dramatic Theatre, and Teatr Montownia of the National Academy of Dramatic Art. Since 2010 she has been a member of the Kabaret na Koniec Świata comedy group.

Dąbrowska is also a television and film actress. She is best known for the role of Mrs. Basia (based on Barbara Skrzypek) in The Chairman's Ear (2017–2019), and Jasiunia Rostworowska-Fus in Blondynka (2010, 2013–2021). She is also known for her roles in films such as Mall Girls (2009), All Will Be Well (2007), Lullaby (2010), Three Minutes. 21:37 (2011), Ida (2013), Gods (2014), Afterimage (2016).

== Filmography ==
=== Films ===
Year	Title	Role	Notes	Ref.
1992	Turlajgroszek	Ziarenko	Television play	
1992	Czerwony Kapturek	Little Red Riding Hood	Television play	
1994	Prorok Ilja	Tamara	Television play	
1995	Car Mikołaj	Ola	Television play	
1997	Piękno	Frosia	Television play	
1998	W poszukiwaniu zgubionego buta	Mother	Television play	
1998	Drzewo	Zośka	Television play	
2000	Cud purymowy	Office worker		
2000	...Aż chce się żyć	Helena	Television play	
2002	Pielgrzymi	Irena Prawdziwa	Television play	
2003	Łucja i jej dzieci	Woman	Television play	
2003	King Ubu	Stanislas's daughter		
2003	Biała sukienka	Zocha Suszkowa		
2003	Show	Beatka		
2006	Przybyli ułani	Helka		
2007	All Will Be Well	Zofia Kwiatkowska		
2008	Niezawodny system	Vendor		
2008	Nie kłam, kochanie	Secretary		
2008	Król i królik		Voice; short film	
2009	Mall Girls	Julia's mother		
2009	Polska nowela filmowa	Mszyca	Short film	
2009	Janosik: A True Story	Woman		
2010	Benek	Excentric woman		
2010	Milczenie jest złotem	Receptionist		
2010	Lullaby	Kamińska		
2011	Three Minutes. 21:37	Magdalena		
2011	Czarnobyl. Cztery dni w kwietniu	Pregnant woman	Television play	
2012	Żaklina	Teacher	Short film	
2012	Ołówek	Mother	Short film	
2013	Ida	Waiteress		
2013	In Hiding	Party activist	Uncredited	
2013	Life Feels Good	Neighbour	In a deleted scene	
2014	Nasza klasa	Zocha	Television play	
2014	Gods	Priest's mother		
2015	Ślady		Short film	
2015	Miranda	Janitor	Short film	
2016	Afterimage	Office worker		
2016	I'm a Killer	Krystyna Gorecka		
2017	Po prostu przyjazn	Nurse		
2017	Letters to Santa 3	Urszula		
2017	Sprawa Rity G.	Elżbieta	Television play	
2017	Dregs	Selena	Short film; voice	
2018	Okna, okna	Henio and Wacek's mother		
2018	7 Emotions	Dana		
2019	Rock'n'Roll Eddie	Cook		
2019	My Name is Sara	Marina		
2019	Black Mercedes	Wielgatowa		
2019	Their Lucky Stars	Mrs. Jadzia		
2020	Własne śmieci	Mother	Short film; voice	
2020	Nobody Sleeps in the Woods Tonight	Janeczka		
2021	Nobody Sleeps in the Woods Tonight Part 2	Janeczka		
2021	The Getaway King	Head teacher		
2021	Squared Love	Teacher #2		
2022	Tonia	Mrs. Renia		
2023	Teściowie 2	office worker		
2023	Mord w hurtowni	Kozłowska	Television play	
2023	Squared Love All Over Again	Teacher		
2023	Squared Love Everlasting	Teacher		
2023	Kajtek Czarodziej	Neighbour	Voice	

=== Television series ===
Year	Title	Role	Notes	Ref.
1997	Bride of War	Polish peasant	Uncredited; episode no. 3	
1998	Boża podszewka	Wandzia	5 episodes	
1998	13 posterunek	Iwonka	Episode: "Zemsta" (no. 28)	
1998	The Clan	Buffet worker	Episode no. 155	
2001	The Clan	Zagrosikowa	Episode no. 523	
1999	Wszystkie pieniądze świata	Aldona Kraszewska	4 episodes	
1999	Palce lizać	Irena	Episode: "Kontrola" (no. 7)	
2000	Lokatorzy	Misia	Episode: "Dzisiaj twoja kolej" (no. 3)	
2001	Twarze i maski	Prompter	7 episodes	
2001	Garderoba damska	Lusia	7 episodes	
2002	Na dobre i na złe	Rudzińska	Episode: "W trosce o przyszłość" (no. 100)	
2003–2009	Plebania	Katarzyna Machejkowa	Recurring role; 130 episodes	
2004	Stacyjka	Teresa Krupa	7 episodes	
2004	Sublokatorzy	Sister Beata	Episode: "Uczta duchowa" (no. 3)	
2004	Crime Detectives	Rudzikowa	Episode: "Sponsor" (no. 10)	
2007	Crime Detectives	Krystyna Lorek	Episode: "Na planie" (no. 75)	
2004–2006	Bulionerzy	Jastrzębska	11 episodes	
2005	Wiedźmy	Gienia	Episode: "Szymek Słupnik" (no. 6)	
2005	Klinika samotnych serc	Nurce	2 episodes	
2005	Czego się boją faceci, czyli seks w mniejszym mieście	Franczeska	Episode: "Miłość jest ślepa" (no. 28)	
2005	Boża podszewka II	Wandzia Jurewicz	5 episodes	
2005	Baśnie i bajki polskie	Queen	Voice; episode: "Zaczarowane pantofelki" (no. 11)	
2005	Baśnie i bajki polskie	Child	Voice; episode: "Zaczarowane pantofelki" (no. 11)	
2005	Baśnie i bajki polskie	Romani woman	Voice; episode: "Krawiec Niteczka" (no. 12)	
2005	Baśnie i bajki polskie	Baba Yaga	Voice; episode: "Krawiec Niteczka" (no. 12)	
2005	Baśnie i bajki polskie	Sparrow	Voice; episode: "Krawiec Niteczka" (no. 12)	
2005	Baśnie i bajki polskie	Members of the crowd	Voice; episode: "Krawiec Niteczka" (no. 12)	
2008	Baśnie i bajki polskie	Brunhild	Voice; episode: "Złota jabłoń" (no. 16)	
2008	Baśnie i bajki polskie	Lady-in-waiting	Voice; episode: "Zimowe wróżki" (no. 18)	
2006	The Magic Tree	Librarian	Episode: "Połykacze książek" (no. 7)	
2006	Hela w opałach	Mrs. Szmit	Episode: "Powiedz dzieciom dobranoc" (no. 5)	
2006	Egzamin z życia		Episode no. 66	
2007	5 Dilemma Street	Wojtaszkowa		
2007	Mamuśki	Zdzisława	Episode no. 18	
2007	Królowie śródmieścia	Wanda	Episode: "Cofnąć czas" (no. 12)	
2007	Ja wam pokażę!	Woman at the police station	Episode no. 9	
2007	Prime Minister	Iwona	Episode no. 2	
2007–2008	Glina	Zofia Auguścikowa	2 episodes	
2008	Skorumpowani	Machulowa		
2008	Agentki	Coffee expert	Episode: "Cud czyli samopomoc mundurowa" (no. 7)	
2009	Niania	Vendor	Episode: "Ślub Małgosi" (no. 131)	
2009	Father Matthew	Jadwiga Pope	Episode: "Aniołek" (no. 12)	
2010	Father Matthew	Jadwiga	Episode: "Zakładnik" (no. 35)	
2014	Father Matthew	Cleaner	Episode: "Ślady przeszłości" (no. 148)	
2021	Father Matthew	Krystyna Borek	Episode: "Nispodzianka" (no. 329)	
2010, 2013–2021	Blondynka	Jasiunia Rostworowska-Fus	Main role; 106 episodes	
2019	Blondynka	Zofia Skiba	4 episodes	
2011	Janosik: A True Story	Woman		
2011	Prosto w serce	Teresa Markiewicz	6 episodes	
2011	Instynkt	Mrs. Kmita	Episode: "Bilet do sławy" (no. 6)	
2012	Szpilki na Giewoncie	Jola from Bemowo	Episode no. 50	
2012	Ja to mam szczęście!	Professor Popławska	Episode no. 52	
2013	Without Secrets	Krystyna Krawczyk	3 episodes	
2013	Bar u Danuśki	Fredzia		
2014	The Passing Bells	Helen	Episode no. 1	
2015	Skazane	Social Welfare Center Qualification Committee chairperson	Episode no. 6	
2017	W rytmie serca	Oksana	Episode: "Kto tu kłamie?" (no. 2)	
2017	Grześki wracają do szkoły	Jezierska	2 episodes	
2017–2019	The Chairman's Ear	Mrs. Basia	Main role; 50 episodes	
2018	Wszystkie twarze Grzegorza Damięckiego	Ghost		
2018	La La Poland			
2018–2022	Na Wspólnej	Teresa Bednarczuk	35 episodes	
2020	The Woods	Bożena Perkowska	4 episodes	
2020	Onlajn	Miśka		
2021	Komisarz Mama	Natalia Lasota	Episode no. 3	
2022	Glitter	Bogusia	3 episodes	
2023	Servant of the People	Head teacher	5 episodes	
2023	Sortownia	Beata	8 episodes	
