= Kingsajz =

- Directed by: Juliusz Machulski
- Written by: Jolanta Hartwig; Juliusz Machulski
- Produced by: Andrzej Soltysik
- Starring: Jacek Chmielnik; Jerzy Stuhr; Katarzyna Figura
- Cinematography: Jerzy Łukaszewicz
- Edited by: Mirosława Garlicka
- Music by: Krzesimir Dębski
- Release date: May 2, 1988 (Poland)
- Running time: 105 min
- Country: Poland
- Language: Polish

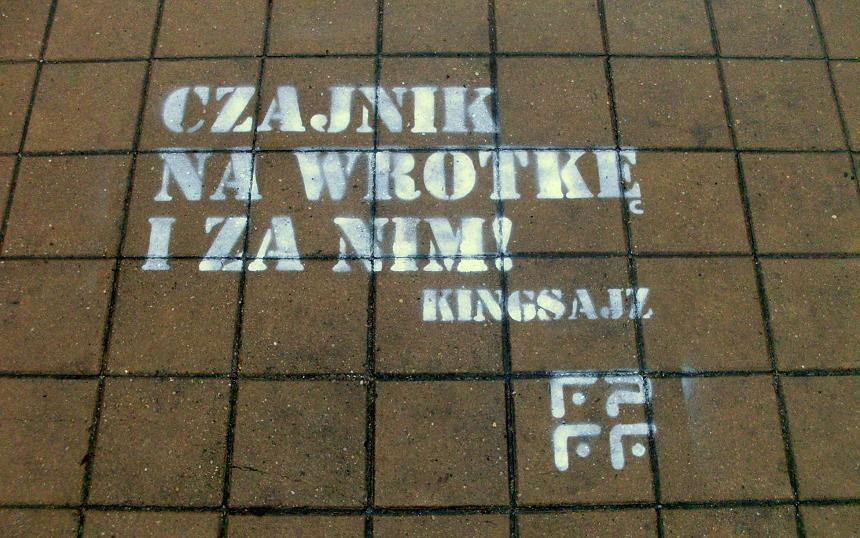
Quotation from film 'Kingsajz' advertising XXXIV Polish Film Festival in Gdynia 2009

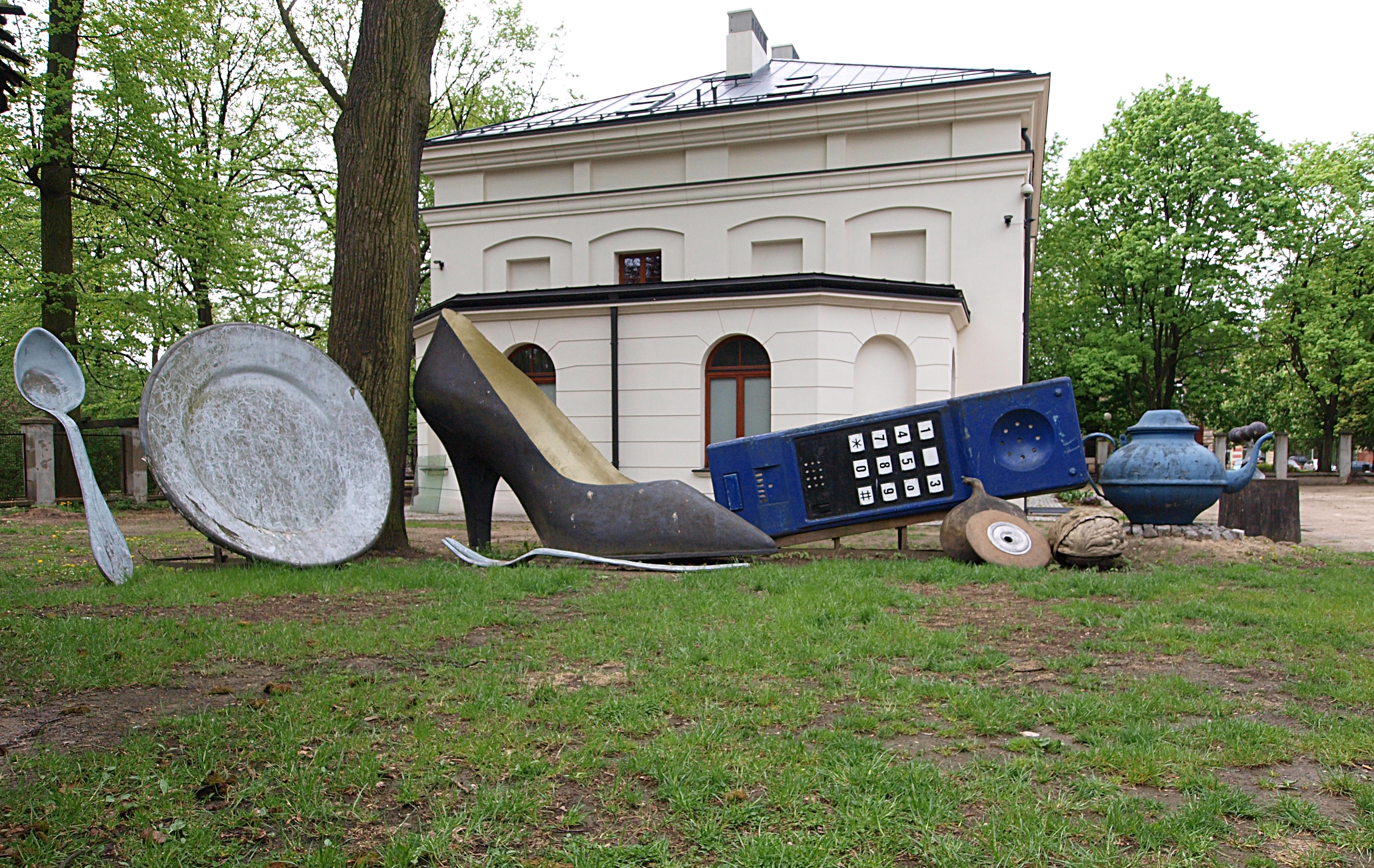
Some of the surviving huge props used in the film, displayed in Łódź in 2010

Kingsajz is a 1988 cult Polish comedy fantasy film directed by Juliusz Machulski. The action takes place in late communist Poland and in a fictional Lilliputian kingdom called Szuflandia (Drawerland), hidden deep underground the Quaternary Research Institute. The movie is an allegory of a communist regime and thus was received very enthusiastically by anti-communist society.

Kingsajz used highly oversized props and sets, supervised by production designer Janusz Sosnowski, intended to capture the difference in size between the little people and the large things from the above ground world that they use. The Drawerland sets were built in Łódź Studio soundstages as wall-to-wall set-constructions. Some scenes were optically enhanced by matte painting by artists from Barrandov Studios. As of 2024, some of the largest surviving props from the film (such as a giant telephone, a gigantic lady's shoe, a car-sized iron teapot used in the krasnoludki land of Szuflandia / Drawerland, gate-sized kitchen utensils, and more) are displayed outside the Museum of Cinematography in Łódź.

The film featured deliberate references to Machulski's earlier and even more famous comedy Vabank (itself a nod to the classic 1973 caper film The Sting) and its sequel Vabank II, by including the two characters of "Kwintek" and "Kramerko", played by the same actors who portrayed Vabank's protagonist, the principled safe-cracker Kwinto, and the antagonist, the crooked banker Kramer.

== Title ==
The name of the film, "Kingsajz", is "King Size" spelled phonetically in Polish. In the movie Kingsajz is the name of a world of humans, in contrast to the Drawerland which is a land of gnomes. In Drawerland everything is miniature and mediocre and above ground everything is considered king size. The name Kingsajz is also the name of a green potion that allows a gnome to become human sized for a certain period.

== Plot ==
Olo Jedlina is a gnome, and while serving the government of Drawerland he is permitted to visit Kingsajz, the realm of humans. However, after getting few drops of a potion that change him to achieve human proportions he decides to stay in Kingsajz for good and he avoids shrinking by regularly drinking a soda drink called Polo-Cockta. He becomes a journalist for a popular magazine and the boyfriend of an attractive model and lives a peaceful life, although in Drawerland he is considered to be a traitor.

His close friend Adaś Happs, a scientist that once helped to produce the Kingsajz potion, rebelled and escaped too. While hiding in Kingsajz he works in his secret laboratory to discover the potion formula, hoping to be able to manufacture it one day and give it to all the gnomes in Drawerland.

The movie starts when Adaś finally discovers the secret and has to immediately escape from his lab which is being demolished by human sized gnome agents that tracked him down. He manages to contact Olo and tell him everything, but before they meet Adaś is kidnapped right in front of Olo. Before that happens however he puts the vial into a pocket of Ala that unknowingly to Olo was also asked by Adaś to be there.

Olo follows her wanting to get the vial with Kingsajz but Ala doesn't trust him at their first meeting, and just shows him empty pocket with a hole in it. She follows him for a while and when they meet at a fashion show in which Olo's girlfriend takes part Ala reveals that she still has a vial and gives it to Olo.

They both decide to free Adaś from Drawerland when he is being interrogated and tortured. They seek help of two others who concoct the plan and lead the rescue action but unfortunately both die before reaching Drawerland.

When Olo gets there alone and liliput-sized he allows himself to be captured and manages to fool Drawerland's high officials that he is in fact a secret agent working on Adaś's case. He gives a name of gnome secret service official that he knew was killed very recently and tells it was his superior and the only person that knew about Olo's assignment. Gnomes don't fully believe him but allow him to meet Adaś. Adaś gives him a message with Kingzajz formula encoded into it.

After that Olo manages to escape from Drawerland, but the vial with Kingsajz which Adaś gave Ala earlier gets smashed, so although he is free, he remains gnome-sized. Ala manages to decipher Adaś's message and knowing the potion ingredients she tries several times with different proportions but fails each time. When she is all resigned Olo manages to contact telepathically with Adaś and learns that water which is one of the ingredients must come from a rusty tap in Adaś's flat.

When Ala goes there and gets water she manages to produce the potion seconds before gnome agents break into her flat to kidnap Olo. The potion works just at the right time for Olo to help the girl and knock down the agents.

Soon Adaś uses telepathy once more to call for help as Drawerland official decipheres his message too, accuses him of treason and the rebel scientist is about to be executed. Olo and Ala manages to save him just in time and Olo goes to Drawerland human-sized to get his friend. There he faces three officials that were chasing him from the beginning. During the fight they give each other shrinking injections and keep fighting while gnome-sized until all three officials are defeated and killed.

The film ends with Olo, Adaś, Ala and her father traveling in a train. Then they notice that train is in fact a model and through the window they see a giant figure of a boy playing with it. They are all terrified when it turns out that there is something more above Kingsajz.

== Cast ==
- Jacek Chmielnik as Olo (Olgierd) Jedlina
- Grzegorz Heromiński as Adaś (Adam) Haps
- Katarzyna Figura as Ala
- Jerzy Stuhr as Kilkujadek, Drawerland's high official
- Jan Machulski as Kwintek, "specialist" I
- Leonard Pietraszak as Kramerko, "specialist" II
- Witold Pyrkosz as Bombalina, Olo's superior
- Maciej Kozłowski as Waś
- Joachim Lamża as Zyl
- Leon Charewicz as Gil
- Bronisław Wrocławski as Pycio
- Olgierd Łukaszewicz as Paragraf
- Marek Walczewski as Ala's father
- Liza Machulska as Ewa
- Halina Machulska as Ewa's mother
- Sławomir Kryński as man in fez on the marketplace
- Zdzisław Kuźniar as man in bonnet on the marketplace
- Beata Tyszkiewicz as woman on the marketplace
- Ryszard Kotys as Nosacz, the prisoner
- Jan Paweł Kruk as Muchomor, the prisoner
- Mariusz Saniternik as Małolet, the prisoner
- Wojciech Skibinski as liliput speaker at the gathering
