= Vinci (film) =

- Directed by: Juliusz Machulski
- Written by: Juliusz Machulski
- Produced by: Juliusz Machulski
- Starring: Robert Więckiewicz; Borys Szyc; Mieczysław Grąbka; Marcin Dorociński; Kamilla Baar; Jacek Król; Jan Machulski
- Cinematography: Edward Kłosiński
- Edited by: Jarosław Pietraszek
- Music by: Maciej Staniecki
- Release date: 17 September 2004
- Running time: 108 minutes 2005
- Country: Poland
- Language: Polish
- Budget: PLN3,500,000

Vinci is a 2004 Polish comedy heist film written, directed, and produced by Juliusz Machulski.

== Plot ==
Cuma (Robert Więckiewicz), an art thief, is commissioned to steal Lady with an Ermine by Leonardo da Vinci, which has been returned from Japan to the Czartoryski Museum in Kraków. Cuma asks his friend and former colleague Julian (Borys Szyc) for help.

Julian goes along with Cuma's plans for the theft, but meanwhile plots to switch the painting for a reproduction, so that the precious original will not be lost. He consults old forger Hagen (Jan Machulski), who assigns the task of making a copy to the talented student Magda (Kamila Baar).

== Cast ==
- Robert Więckiewicz as Robert "Cuma" Cumiński
- Borys Szyc as Julian "Szerszeń" Wolniewicz
- Mieczysław Grąbka as fence Mieczysław "Gruby"
- Marcin Dorociński as police commissioner Łukasz Wilk
- Kamilla Baar as Magda
- Jacek Król as Werbus
- Jan Machulski as Tadeusz Hagen

== Filming ==
Principal photography began April 14, 2004 in Warsaw, and ended on May 21. Most of the filming was done in Kraków, where the movie is set. Filming also took place in Nowa Huta (district of Kraków), Kalwaria Zebrzydowska and Dubie.
