= All Will Be Well =

- Directed by: Tomasz Wiszniewski
- Starring: Robert Więckiewicz; Adam Werstak
- Release date: 5 October 2007
- Running time: 98 minutes
- Country: Poland
- Language: Polish

All Will Be Well (Polish: Wszystko będzie dobrze) is a 2007 Polish drama film directed by Tomasz Wiszniewski.

== Cast ==
- Robert Więckiewicz - Andrzej
- Adam Werstak - Pawel Kwiatkowski
- Beata Kawka - Reporter Anna
- Izabela Dąbrowska - Zofia Kwiatkowska
- Daniel Mąkolski - Piotr Kwiatkowski
- Jarosław Gruda - Postman Henio
- Janusz Chabior - Doctor
- Janusz Kłosiński - Priest
- Zdzisław Kuźniar - Wladek
