= Sexmission =

1984 film by Juliusz Machulski

- Directed by: Juliusz Machulski
- Written by: Juliusz Machulski, Jolanta Hartwig, Pavel Hajný
- Produced by: Juliusz Machulski
- Starring: Olgierd Łukaszewicz; Jerzy Stuhr; Bożena Stryjkówna; Bogusława Pawelec; Hanna Stankówna; Beata Tyszkiewicz
- Cinematography: Jerzy Łukaszewicz
- Edited by: Miroslawa Garlicka
- Music by: Henryk Kuźniak
- Distributed by: KADR
- Release date: 1984
- Running time: 122 min.
- Country: Poland
- Language: Polish

Sexmission (Polish: Seksmisja) is a 1984 Polish politically satirical cult comedy science fiction action film. It was directed by Juliusz Machulski based on a screenplay he co-wrote with Jolanta Hartwig and Pavel Hajný. Sexmission has earned the title of a cult film over time, although due to the film's association of women's emancipation with the communist dictatorship of the era of the Polish People's Republic, it was the subject of feminist criticism.

== Plot ==
In 1991, Maksymilian "Max" Paradys and Albert Starski volunteer themselves for the first human hibernation experiment, created by professor Wiktor Kuppelweiser. Instead of being awakened 3 years later in 1994 as planned, they wake in the year 2044, in a post-nuclear world. They think they are in a clinic being taken care of by women; Max becomes attracted to Lamia Reno. After asking for professor Kuppelweiser, they are informed that he "doesn't exist", and that there was a war long ago and that males have long been extinct. The men are under constant surveillance; Lamia informs them their society reproduces without males through parthenogenesis. During a briefing, Max kisses Lamia, for which she knocks him down and threatens both men with euthanasia. However, the kiss causes Lamia's drug-inhibited passions to resurface. She finds the oldest living woman Julia Novack, who tells Lamia that the old world with two sexes should be restored.

After several days, Max and Albert are permitted to go out to meet with Her Excellency, the supreme ruler of women. Waiting for her in the bio-sanctuary, they spot a tree with two tiny apples and eat them, having had enough of synthetic food. At the meeting they ask what womankind did to mankind. The women reply the extinction of men is not their fault, but Kuppelweiser's, who, during the war, invented an agent which was supposed to temporarily paralyze male genes, but instead destroyed male genes permanently. Max proposes he and Albert serve as reproducers to restore the male population. However, the women do not wish the old order to return; Her Excellency gestures to the "sacred apple tree" and says it was planted by Arch Mother, and from which, when once in paradise, a male took an apple and seduced a woman with it, by which act paradise was lost. Noticing the missing apples, Her Excellency becomes enraged and demands the men be confined again.

Max and Albert escape by damaging the electric power grid, but are ultimately caught. The women provide them to submit themselves for "naturalization" - undergoing a sex reassignment surgery. When they refuse, the ceiling above the room reveals an assembly of women to determine their fate. In a trial, the women blame males for oppression, evil and vices, and praise their new society. They engage in historical revisionism by claiming that scientists such as Copernicus, Einstein and Pincus were women. When Max and Albert are taken away, the assembly votes on whether the men should undergo forced 'naturalization' or be 'liquidated'. Naturalization is passed by one vote. The men escape again, and encounter other women who have never seen a man. They are cornered by the security team and escape down a waste chute. They discover the nest of "decadency" - one of the anarchist, "hippie" women's groups, who do not wish to be part of the oppressive regime, playing loud music, and some engaging in lesbian relations. They mistake Max and Albert for government spies and, in the meantime, the pursuing regime forces attack, and subsequent chaos provides the men with an opportunity to escape. During their escape, the men stumble upon Lamia, who provides them with a way to see the outside - a periscope - and reveals that they live deep underground in expanded old mines. The periscope shows a dark, rocky landscape above ground, and sensors indicate high levels of "Kuppelweiser radiation", a side effect of the M bomb. However, it transpires that Lamia's "help" was a ruse to capture the men and force them into surgery. Lamia is congratulated by Tekla and Emma Dax, but they also inform her that their section will now be in charge of the males, which devastates Lamia.

In the hands of Tekla, the fate of the males is to be different. Their organs will be extracted for transplantation, and their remains will be tested as a food source due to a protein shortage. The chief surgeon, Dr Yanda, an old lady, is revealed to be Max's daughter, who now delights in taking revenge for his abandonment of his wife and child in favor of hibernation for profit. Lamia sabotages the surgery and helps the men escape as revenge for Tekla and Dax taking the men and her research. In the periscope room Lamia tells the guards she will blast the whole block if they do not give her the code activating a capsule reaching the surface, while Max and Albert find and change into protective suits. The guards claim that only Her Excellency knows the password required; enraged, Max shouts "kurwa mać!" (a popular Polish profanity as versatile as "fuck" in English, lit. "[your] mother's a whore"), and the capsule is activated. Exploring the barren surface, Max bumps against an invisible barrier and is unable to go further. He cuts the fabric of the barrier, revealing a dazzling light. They all go through the hole and find themselves on a beach, the periscope area surrounded by a small tent-like structure with the barren landscape panorama painted on the inside of the canvas. They reach a forest, but the suits are running out of oxygen. Max points skyward to a flying stork and declares "if it can live, it means we can live too". After removing the suits, they come across a villa with food. While eating in the garden, they are found by Emma; armed with a harpoon, she demands their surrender, but she faints from lack of oxygen. Albert performs CPR on her. When she regains consciousness, Emma begins to fight with Albert; on the TV they see an official government broadcast of events, stating that Lamia and Emma are dead and including an interview with "naturalized" Max and Albert, who claim to be feeling well. Emma is shocked, unable to understand such lies and all the strange environment "with too much air". Max goes with Lamia to a bedroom and tries to explain to her what mating is, while Albert tries his luck with Emma.

In the living room, Her Excellency emerges from the elevator hidden within a closet to feed her caged birds. When she opens the wardrobe, she is attacked by Max who was hiding inside. Her Excellency's breasts and hair are stripped, revealing that 'she' is a male in disguise. 'Her' Excellency tells the men that after the war, when the League of Women took power, the few boys remaining were naturalized into girls, but he was hidden by his mother. Growing up in a female disguise, he joined the League and was eventually elected 'Her Excellency'. He was too afraid of women to form a relationship with any and, by revealing himself, to try to restore the old order. The government has been exaggerating the radiation level to keep the inhabitants easier to control; likewise, the inhabitants are medicated to remove sexual desire. The three make a deal: Max and Albert will not compromise 'Her' Excellency's true identity, but they will stay in his home with Lamia and Emma. Later, Max and Albert, disguised as laboratory workers, add male gametes to flasks in the incubation centre. Months later, a nurse, routinely wrapping newborns in blankets, is horrified to see a penis.

== Cast ==
- Olgierd Łukaszewicz as Albert Starski
- Jerzy Stuhr as Maximilian 'Max' Paradys
- Bożena Stryjkówna as Lamia Reno
- Bogusława Pawelec as Emma Dax
- Hanna Stankówna as dr Tekla
- Beata Tyszkiewicz as dr Berna
- Ryszarda Hanin as dr Jadwiga Yanda
- Barbara Ludwiżanka as Julia Novack
- Mirosława Marcheluk as Secretary
- Hanna Mikuć as Linda
- Elżbieta Zającówna as Zająconna
- Dorota Stalińska as TV Reporter (1991)
- Ewa Szykulska as Instructor
- Janusz Michałowski as Professor Wiktor Kuppelweiser
- Wiesław Michnikowski as Her Excellency

== Political and social satire ==
The film contains numerous subtle allusions to the realities of the communist-bloc society, particularly to that of the People's Republic of Poland just before the fall of communism, perhaps in the anticipation of the major events to come; the fall of communism and the rise of political liberty. When Max and Albert escape, they jump through the wall, which then starts to shake (often associated with later Lech Wałęsa's jumping over the wall of the Gdańsk shipyard, and also with the subsequent fall of the Berlin Wall).

The secret meeting of the Women's League apparatchiks and their lies to the women parallels the communist government of Poland.

The barren, hostile landscape of the supposed outside world (as seen via the periscope) is an allusion to the Communist era propaganda about the "Capitalist West" with its crime, decadence and poverty, and the scene where the heroes cut through the canvas to discover an entirely different world in many aspects "better" than the one they came from reflects the culture shock of many visitors from Communist Poland when experiencing the Western European countries for the first time.

This dimension of the movie appears to typically escape the viewer more removed from the context. Some sections of this kind were left out from the version shown in Polish theaters by the government censors, but many passed through.

The movie can also be viewed as a satire directed at intergender conflict (wrong-headed feminism or wrong-headed masculism), prudery, or totalitarianism.

The movie's title is a word play on the Polish words "Seks" (sex/gender), "misja" (mission), and "eksmisja" (eviction).

== Reception ==
In a contemporary review, Variety stated that the film was "not up to the standards of those quality Polish pics of the late 1970s [...] nonetheless the best pic to emerge from the Warsaw studios over the past season."

The film has been very popular in Poland. It was proclaimed to be the best Polish film of the last 30 years in a 2005 joint poll by readers of three popular film magazines. However, this assessment by the audience was considered to be a surprise as it disagreed with the historical rankings of Polish movies by the professional film critics. They did not like the openly anti-feminist notions and its connection to totalitarianism. It received the Złota Kaczka award for the best Polish movie of 1984. The movie was also fairly popular in Hungary when shown a couple of years later.

Two cites from this film, Uważaj, tu mogą być promile! ("Be careful, promiles could be in here!") and Dlaczego tu nie ma klamek? ("Why are there not any handles in here?") were used in Polish dubbing of Shrek 2 and were part of Donkey's role, who was dubbed by Jerzy Stuhr (Max Paradys in Sexmission).

== See also ==
- Silo (TV series) in a very similar setting (subterranean, periscope/camera, contaminated air threat, stabilising lies, authoritarian rule, birth control)
- Logan's Run, a 1976 American science fiction dystopian film.
- A.D. 2044, a video game based on the film
- Herland
- Who Needs Men?, a 1972 novel by Edmund Cooper
- Idiocracy, an American film about hibernees who wake up 500 years in the future
- Y: The Last Man
- Assemblywomen, ancient Greek comedy by Aristophanes describing a society ruled entirely by women
- The Gate to Women's Country, a novel about a city-state of women whom a male garrison plots to take over and subjugate
- The Female Man, a multiple universe spanning novel including a world where men have died out in a plague.
- "Lithia", an episode of The Outer Limits with a similar premise
- "Worlds End Harem", a Japanese anime based on the manga of the same name, about a world where men are extinct from a virus and a few male survivors are to repopulate the world.
