= Skrzypek =

Skrzypek is a Polish-language surname. Notable people with this surname include:

- Barbara Skrzypek (1959–2025), Polish government official and secretary
- Sławomir Skrzypek (1963–2010), a Polish banker
- Paweł Skrzypek (born 1971), a Polish retired football player
