= Vabank =

- Directed by: Juliusz Machulski
- Written by: Juliusz Machulski
- Starring: Jan Machulski; Witold Pyrkosz; Leonard Pietraszak; Jacek Chmielnik; Krzysztof Kiersznowski
- Cinematography: Jerzy Łukaszewicz
- Edited by: Mirosława Garlicka
- Music by: Henryk Kuźniak
- Release date: 1981
- Running time: 108 minutes
- Country: Poland
- Language: Polish

Vabank is a 1981 Polish comedy heist film written and directed by Juliusz Machulski, set in 1934 Warsaw (although actually filmed in Łódź and Piotrków Trybunalski).

The film received several awards and nominations, among them Best Debut Director at the 1981 Polish Film Festival, and Best Film at Mystfest 1982.

The film's title is Polish for Va banque, a gambling term for when one is betting to win or lose all.

== Plot ==
In October 1934 Henryk Kwinto, a famous safe cracker in Warsaw criminal circles and also a jazz trumpeter, is released from prison, where he has spent the past six years. After arriving home, he discovers that his wife has already found a substitute for him; the police commissioner Karelicki. Kwinto removes a hidden roll of banknotes out of the leg of a chair, places his key to the apartment on the table and leaves.

Near the city gates he is met by two younger petty criminals, brothers Moks and Nuta, who have successfully debuted by robbing a jewellery store and now wish to have the legendary safe-cracker as an accomplice. Kwinto takes out the mouthpiece of a trumpet and asserts that they have mistaken him for someone else and that he is a musician. Although they seem to be confused, the brothers nonetheless tell him the address of their automobile shop in case "Mr Musician would be willing to play together with them".

Kwinto gets a hotel room. Soon he is visited by his former accomplice and now successful banker, Gustaw Kramer who informs him that six years ago, Kwinto was not arrested by chance. Kramer was caught in the act, and then agreed to lure the elusive safe-cracker into a trap set up by the police. As compensation for moral damages, he gives Kwinto 45,000 złoty, and calls them even. In response, Kwinto advises him not to tell him the address of his bank, to which Kramer says with a sneer that he is confident in the invulnerability of the bank's safes. He uses the phrase "ear of a herring" (Polish: ucho od śledzia, an idiom, similar to the English "Goose egg") hinting at the impossibility of robbing his bank.

Kwinto goes to visit a musician named Tadeusz Rychliński, with whom he performed in a band six years earlier. From the wife of Tadeusz, Marta, he learns about the death of his friend. Shortly before his death, Tadeusz deposited all his savings, 19,000 złoty, at Kramer's bank, but on the way home he was robbed, and the receipt was taken, making the deposit unavailable. The next day, Tadeusz allegedly threw himself out of the window. According to the widow, the police arrived to conclusion that it was a suicide.

Marta gives Kwinto Tadeusz's trumpet as a memento. In its mouthpiece Kwinto discovers a note written by Rychliński which reads "I know how Kramer became the owner of the bank" along with directions to a folder with further details. Kwinto arrives to the conclusion that the robbery and suicide of Tadeusz were staged at Kramer's request.

In light of the discovered circumstances Kwinto starts to act. He finds Moks and Nuta in their automobile shop and instructs them to find the last address of his old friend Duńczyk. Kramer receives the 45,000 złoty he gave to Kwinto in the mail along with a newspaper cut out of Tadeusz's obituary and understands that Kwinto has rejected his offer of peace. He sends Krempitsch, a hired killer who killed Tadeusz by pushing him out of a window, to kill Kwinto.

The brothers have still not found Duńczyk. The search has been taken over by Kwinto himself and remembering Duńczyk's old habits, finds his old friend at a football game. However, Duńczyk claims to be finished with his criminal past and more than anything values peace. At first he refuses, but Henryk convinces Duńczyk that for him taking vengeance on Kramer is a matter of principle. They witness Krempitsch, in trying to kill Kwinto, accidentally kill a complete stranger. Taking the advantage of the ensuing chaos, Kwinto and Duńczyk leave the stadium. Duńczyk eventually agrees to participate in his friend's daring plan.

Kwinto presents his plan to rob Kramer's bank and frame him for it. Duńczyk heads to the bank and opens an account in order to carry out reconnaissance. With an experienced eye, he assesses all the alarm features of the bank's building and in his home workshop, by method of trial and error, figures out the shape of a plate capable of blocking the alarm.

The companions begin to implement the plan. Kramer, seemingly by chance, meets the charming young Natalia, whom he helps to start her stalled car, an encounter engineered by Kwinto and his accomplices. A week later Kramer, goes to visit her with a bouquet of flowers and champagne. In the landing of her building, he runs into a black man who exits a neighboring apartment with a Dalmatian on a leash. Natalia asks Kramer to help her take her necklace off. Unbeknownst to Kramer, the plate Duńczyk made to block the alarm has been attached to the necklace, and in taking it off, Kramer inadvertently puts his fingerprints on the plate. Natalia throws the necklace out of the window, where Moks is waiting to pick it up.

During this time, Krempitsch arrives at Kwinto's hotel room and enters with his gun drawn, intending to kill him. He checks every area of the hotel room before taking note of the open window leading to the balcony. He takes a step onto the balcony, where Kwinto kills him. As Kwinto is leaving the hotel through the lobby, under suspicion of robbing the lawyer Walenta's villa, he is detained by the police and brought to the precinct. However he is soon released after the real robbers are apprehended, but not before the police commissioner questions him about Duńczyk and Krempitsch, about whom he lies and claims he doesn't know.

Donning gas masks and gloves, Kwinto and his companions infiltrate the bank through a ventilation shaft of the restaurant located next to it. There, they stun the security guards, block the alarm with the plate, and take all the money and paper securities from the safe after Kwinto cracks it. Using a thermal lance, Nuta cuts an opening through the side wall of the safe, and the group leaves, leaving the plate with Kramer's fingerprints behind. Taking advantage of the owner's absence, the accomplices transport the main portion of the valuables to Kramer's house and hide it there.

In the evening, celebrating the successful heist, the group and Natalia divide the remaining money. Kwinto sends his share to Marta ostensibly as compensation to the family of the victim of the bank's machinations.

In the morning the bank is filled with police. Head of the investigation, commissioner Przygoda, determines that the safe was cut to mislead the police, and was rather was opened using the code. The police find the plate which has Kramer's fingerprints on it, giving the commissioner a reason to conduct a search of Kramer's house, where they find the stolen goods in a basket of dirty laundry.

Kramer attempts to prove that he has an alibi at the time of robbery. At first he takes the police to Natalia's apartment, but instead finds strangers living there who do not recognise Kramer and call him a lunatic. Then the banker remembers another witness, the black man with a Dalmatian who had exited out of the neighboring apartment. But the owner of the apartment vehemently insists that there is no black man living under her roof.

Kramer is arrested. Near the court's building he sees Kwinto reading a newspaper and understands the robbery of his bank and subsequent framing is the handiwork of his former accomplice. Kwinto catches Kramer's glance and touches his ear, reminding Kramer about his words of "ear of a herring" (Polish: ucho od śledzia).

== Cast ==
- Jan Machulski – Henryk Kwinto, a former safecracker
- Leonard Pietraszak – Gustaw Kramer, a former accomplice of Kwinto turned successful banker
- Witold Pyrkosz – Duńczyk, a friend and an accomplice of Kwinto
- Jacek Chmielnik – Moks, a petty thief
- Krzysztof Kiersznowski – Nuta, a brother and an accomplice of Moks
- Elżbieta Zającówna – Natalia, Moks' fiancée
- Marek Walczewski – Twerdiewicz, a prison warden
- Tadeusz Proc – Tadeusz Rychliński
- Ewa Szykulska – Marta Rychlińska, a widow of Tadeusz Rychliński
- Zdzisław Kuźniar – Krempitsch, a professional killer
- Józef Para – commissioner Przygoda, a police officer
- Zbigniew Geiger – Stawiski, a secretary of Kramer
- Zofia Grąziewicz – a wife of Kwinto
- Janusz Michałowski – commissioner Karelicki, a police officer and a lover of Kwinto's wife
- Ryszard Kotys – Melski
- Henryk Bista – Jan Rożek

== Sequel ==
A sequel, Vabank II, was made in 1984.
