= Jerzy Fedorowicz =

Polish actor, theatre director, poet and politician

Jerzy Feliks Fedorowicz
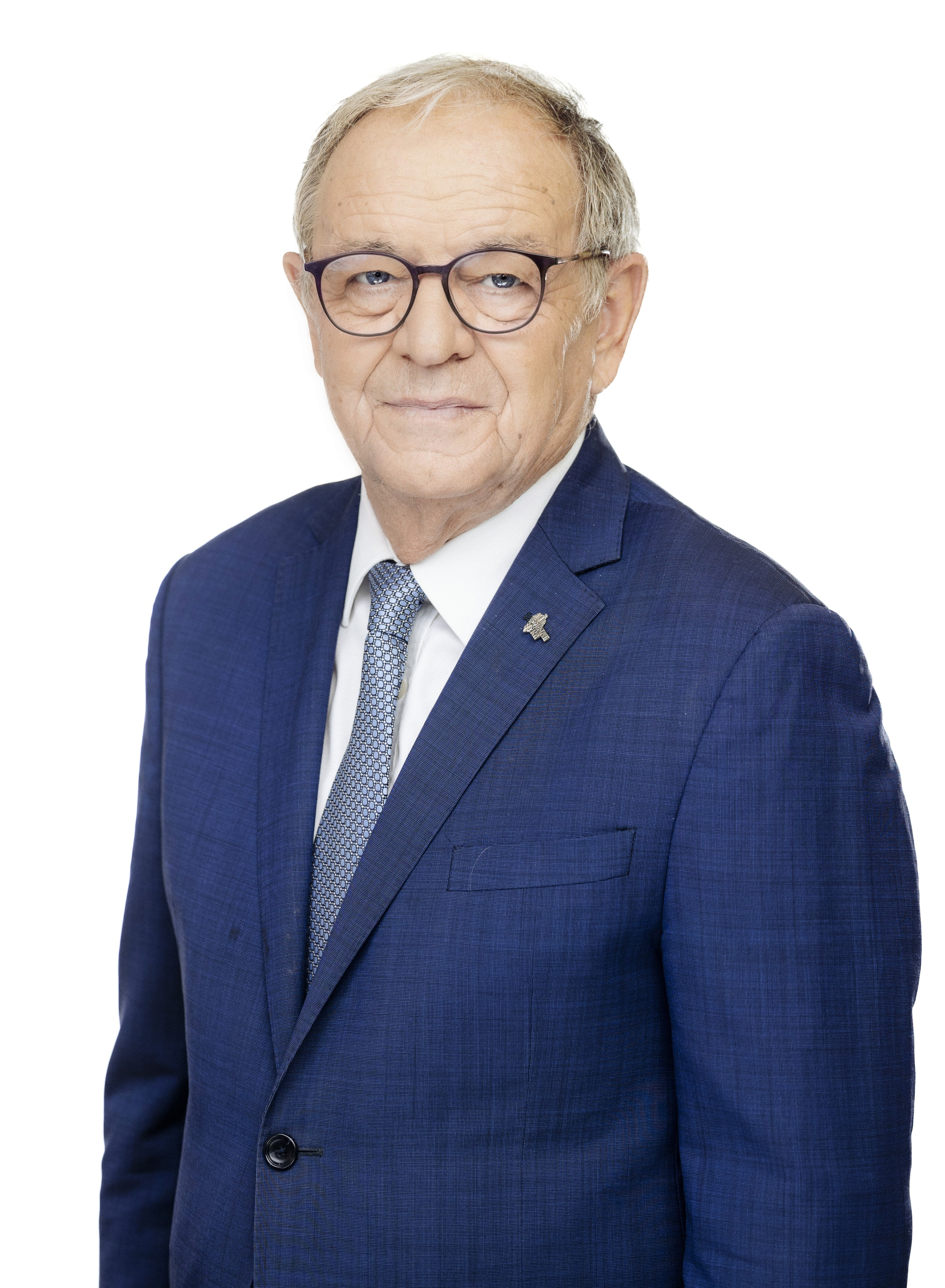

Member of the Sejm
- Incumbent
- Assumed office 25 September 2005
- Constituency: 13 – Kraków

Personal details
- Born: 29 October 1947 (age 79) Polanica-Zdrój, Poland
- Party: Civic Platform
- Occupation: Actor, poet
- Website: jerzyfedorowicz.eu

Jerzy Feliks Fedorowicz (born 29 October 1947) is a Polish actor, theatre director, poet, politician, a former member of the Sejm (2005–2009), and member of the Senate (2015–).

After graduating from the Academy for the Dramatic Arts in Kraków, he became an actor of Teatr Rozmaitości in Kraków (Variety Theatre in Kraków), Teatr Dramatyczny (Dramatic Theatre) in Szczecin (1970–1971) and Teatr Stary (The Old Theatre) in Kraków (1971–1989). Since 1989, he has been a managing and artistic director of the Teatr Ludowy (The People's Theatre) in Nowa Huta.

He was one of forerunners of an art therapy method. In 1991 and 1992, Fedorowicz directed the play Romeo and Juliet, for which he cast local skinheads and punks. He was elected to Sejm on 25 September 2005; getting 5694 votes in 13 Kraków district as a candidate from the Civic Platform list, and more recently was elected to the Senate in 2015.

== Selected filmography ==
- Hero of the Year (1987)

== See also ==
- Members of Polish Sejm 2005-2007
