= Ewa Szykulska =

Polish actress (born 1949)

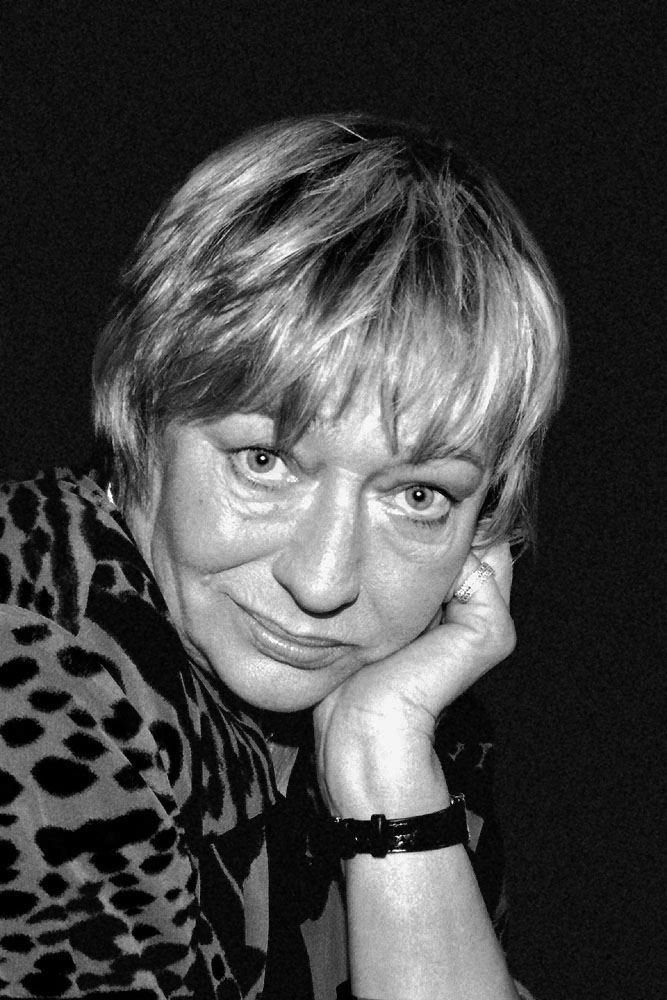
Ewa Szykulska (2005)

Ewa Szykulska (born September 11, 1949) is a Polish, film, stage, and TV actress.

In 1971, she graduated from actors department of the National Higher School of Theatre

== Selected filmography ==
Her debut was the 1966 musical comedy short about Polish piano duo Marek i Wacek.

- Ojciec (1967) as Zenobius's girlfriend
- Gra (1968) as Ewa
- Człowiek z M-3 (1968) as Martha
- Sygnały MMXX (1970) as Rosie
- Hydrozagadka (1971) as Iolya
- Samochodzik i templariusze (1971) as Karen Petersen; children's TV series based on the story series Pan Samochodzik
- Gonitwa (1971) as dressmaker's client
- Pięć i pół bladego Józka (1971) as girl in the car
- Fortuna (1972) as Ada
- Dziewczyny do wzięcia (1972) as postal worker
- The Deluge (1974) as Zonia
- The Star of Captivating Happiness (1975) as Pauline Geuble
- Ile jest życia (1975) as Iva; TV film series, episodes 9, 13
- 07 Come In (1978) as Ewa Rogulska; TV series
- A Declaration of Love (1977) as commissar Zinochka
- Kariera Nikodema Dyzmy (1980) as Countess Lala Koniecpolska; by the book The Career of Nicodemus Dyzma as Lyala Konetspolska
- Twenty Six Days from the Life of Dostoyevsky (1981) as Polina Suslova
- Vabank (1981) as Marta Rychlinska
- Sexmission (1984) as Instructor
- Nadzór (1985) as Stacha Wilecka
- Vabank II, czyli riposta (1985) as Marta
- 13 posterunek (1997) as Zofia
- Lokatorzy (2000–2003) as Helena Bogacka
- Azazel (2002) as Fraulein Pfuhl; Russian TV series
- Casus belli (2002) as episode
- Dotknij mnie (2003) as Ewa
- Mój agent (2022) as Mira Kornacka

== Awards ==
- 1985: Award of the Minister of Culture and Art, 2nd degree, for outstanding film and theater creations
- 1985: Silver Cross of Merit
- 2004: 8th Comedy Film Festival, Lubomierz — Crystal Garnet — award for the best comedy actress (audience choice)
- 2008: Zielona Góra — Quest Europe — Wielki Ukłon (Grand Bow) — honorary award for "everything beautiful with which the viewer's soul could be nourished and watered"
- 2016: Imprint of the palm in Promenada Gwiazd w Międzyzdrojach, an alley of stars (Walk of Fame) in Międzyzdroje, Poland for her role in Lokatorzy
