= Olympics 40 =

1980 Polish film

- Directed by: Andrzej Kotkowski
- Written by: Michał Komar; Andrzej Kotkowski
- Starring: Mariusz Benoit
- Cinematography: Witold Adamek
- Release date: 23 June 1980
- Running time: 96 minutes
- Country: Poland
- Language: Polish

Olympics 40 (Polish: Olimpiada 40) is a 1980 Polish drama film directed by Andrzej Kotkowski. The film was selected as the Polish entry for the Best Foreign Language Film at the 53rd Academy Awards, but was not accepted as a nominee.

== Plot ==
The film is based on actual events from World War II. During August 1940, prisoners of war celebrated a "special Olympics" called the International Prisoner-of-War Olympic Games at Stalag XIII-A in Langwasser, near Nuremberg, Germany. An Olympic flag, 29 by 46 cm in size, was made of a Polish prisoner's shirt and, drawn in crayon, it featured the Olympic rings and banners for Belgium, France, Great Britain, Norway, Poland, and the Netherlands. Olympics 40 tells the story of these games and of one of the prisoners of war, Teodor Niewiadomski.

== Cast ==
- Mariusz Benoit as Piotr
- Jerzy Bończak as Jacques
- Tadeusz Galia as Leon
- Krzysztof Janczar as Andrzej
- Ryszard Kotys as Schlappke
- Wojciech Pszoniak as Schulz

== See also ==
- 1940 Summer Olympics
- List of submissions to the 53rd Academy Awards for Best Foreign Language Film
- List of Polish submissions for the Academy Award for Best Foreign Language Film
