= Leonard Pietraszak =

Polish actor (1936–2023)

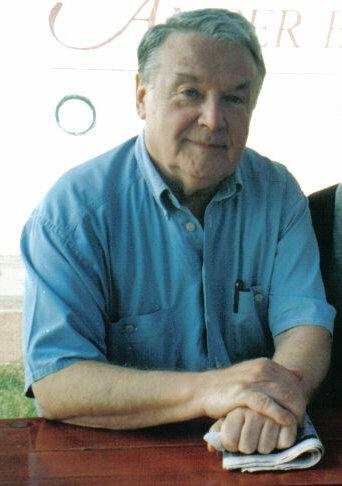
- Born: 6 November 1936; Bydgoszcz, Poland
- Died: 1 February 2023 (aged 86)
- Occupation: Actor
- Years active: 1957–2023

Leonard Pietraszak (6 November 1936 – 1 February 2023) was a Polish actor. He appeared in more than 70 films and television shows since 1957.

== Life and career ==
Pietraszak was best known for playing Gustaw Kramer in popular comedy Vabank and its sequel.

Pietraszak died on 1 February 2023, at the age of 86.

== Selected filmography ==
- Stawka większa niż życie (1967)
- How I Unleashed World War II (1970)
- Gniazdo (1974) – Siegfried I the Older, Count of Walbeck
- Czterdziestolatek (1974–1977) – doctor
- Vabank (1981) – Gustaw Kramer
- Danton (1983) – Lazare Carnot
- Vabank II (1984) – Gustaw Kramer
- Kingsajz (1987)
- Letters to Santa (2011)
