= Ambassada =

- Directed by: Juliusz Machulski
- Written by: Juliusz Machulski
- Starring: Magdalena Grąziowska; Bartosz Porczyk; Robert Więckiewicz; Adam Darski
- Edited by: Rafał Listopad
- Music by: Adam Darski
- Distributed by: Next Film
- Release date: 18 October 2013
- Country: Poland
- Languages: Polish, German
- Box office: $ 1,032,822

AmbaSSada (Embassy) is a 2013 Polish fantasy-comedy film involving time travel.

== Plot ==
A young couple, Melania and Przemek, house-sit in a house which in the inter-war period had been the site of the German embassy.

== Cast ==
- Magdalena Grąziowska – Melania
- Bartosz Porczyk – Przemek, husband of Melania / Anton, grandfather of Przemek
- Ksawery Szlenkier – Otto
- Aleksandra Domańska – Ingeborg
- Robert Więckiewicz – Adolf Hitler
- Jan Englert – Oskar
- Anna Romantowska
- Adam Darski – Joachim von Ribbentrop
- Krystian Wieczorek – Ende
- Szymon Piotr Warszawski – Hans
- Robert Jarociński – Julek
- Anna Terpiłowska – Ola
