= Giraffe and Rhino Hotel =

- Genre: Comedy
- Written by: Grzegorz Łoszewski; Rafał Sabara; Wojciech Saramonowicz
- Directed by: Marek Stacharski
- Starring: Jolanta Fraszyńska; Rafał Królikowski; Franciszek Pieczka; Marta Bitner; Maciej Musiał; Kalina Janusiak
- Composer: Marek Kuczyński
- Country of origin: Poland
- Original language: Polish
- No. of seasons: 1
- No. of episodes: 13

Production
- Producer: Roman Sawka
- Cinematography: Paweł Figurski
- Editors: Rafał Listopad; Maciej Pawliński
- Running time: 42 minutes
- Production companies: Telewizja Polska; Akson Studio

Original release
- Network: TVP1
- Release: 24 May – 14 September 2008

Giraffe and Rhino Hotel (Polish: Hotel pod żyrafą i nosorożcem) is a 2008 Polish-language drama television series directed by Marek Stacharski, and written by Grzegorz Łoszewski, Rafał Sabara, and Wojciech Saramonowicz. It aired on TVP1 from 24 May 2008 to 14 September 2008, and had 13 episodes in total, each with a running time of 42 minutes.

== Plot ==
Anna Miłobędzka and Roman Miłobędzki, together with their children: Aleksandra, Jan, and Zuza, move to a villa in a suburban town near Warsaw, Poland. There they open an animal shelter named Giraffe and Rhino Hotel, where aside from regular household pets such as dogs and cats, they shelter exotic animals, such as snakes, mokeys, and a camel.

== Cast ==
- Jolanta Fraszyńska as Anna Miłobędzka
- Rafał Królikowski as Roman Miłobędzki
- Franciszek Pieczka as Franciszek Alba
- Marta Bitner as Aleksandra Miłobędzka
- Maciej Musiał as Jan Miłobędzki
- Kalina Janusiak as Zuza Miłobędzka
  - Wiktoria Gąsiewska as the voice of Zuza Miłobędzka in episisodes 1–6
- Antoni Królikowski as Maciek Bury
- Tomasz Dedek as Jurek Krzywulski
- Wiesław Wójcik as Kulesza
- Henryk Talar as a professor
- Artur Janusiak as a mayor
- Krzysztof Stelmaszyk as Bury
- Bartosz Turzyński as a veterinarian

== Production ==
The series was directed by Marek Stacharski, written by Grzegorz Łoszewski, Rafał Sabara, and Wojciech Saramonowicz, and produced by Roman Sawka. The cinematography was done by Paweł Figurski, music by Marek Kuczyński, editing by Rafał Listopad and Maciej Pawliński, and scenography by Kinga Babczyńska. The series was produced by Telewizja Polska and Akson Studio. Its pilot episode, "Terrarysta", which was later aired as the 6th episode, premiered on 24 May 2008. The show was aired on TVP1 from 8 June to 14 September 2008, and had 13 episodes in total, each with a running time of 42 minutes.
