= Robert Więckiewicz =

Polish actor

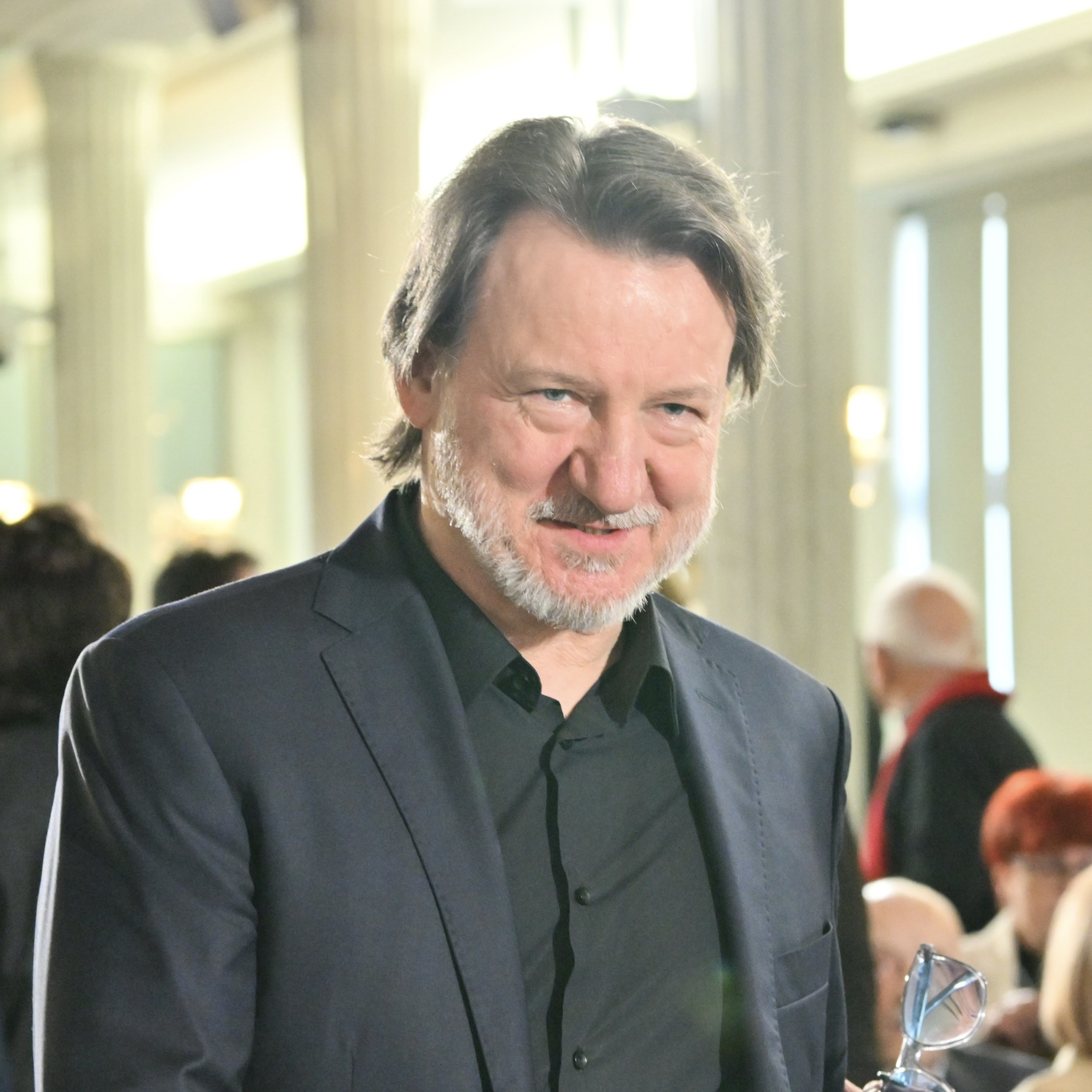
- Born: 30 June 1967 (age 59); Nowa Ruda, Poland
- Education: Ludwik Solski Academy for the Dramatic Arts
- Occupation: Actor
- Years active: 1991–present
- Spouse: Natalia Adaszyńska
- Children: 1 (son)

Robert Więckiewicz (born 30 June 1967) is a Polish film and television actor from Nowa Ruda, Poland. He is a member of the European Film Academy. In 2013, he received Best Actor Award at the Chicago International Film Festival for his role in film Walesa: Man of Hope. He is also a three-time recipient of the Polish Academy Award for Best Actor as well as the recipient of the Polish Academy Award for Best Supporting Actor.

In 2014, he was awarded the Knight's Cross of the Order of Polonia Restituta.

== Selected filmography ==
Film
Year	Title	Role	Notes
2023	Scarborn	Dunin	
2023	Disco Boy	Gavril	
2022	Filip	Staszek	
2022	The Behaviorist	Gerard Edling	
2021	The Getaway King	Barski	
2021	Leave No Traces		
2021	The Wedding	Rysiek Wilk	
2019	The Coldest Game	Alfred the PKiN Director	
2018	Clergy	Tadeusz Trybus	
2016	Polish Legends: Twardowsky 2.0.	Jan Twardowsky	main role; short
2015	Polish Legends: Twardowsky	Jan Twardowsky	main role; short
2015	A Grain of Truth (Ziarno Prawdy)	Teodor Szacki	
2014	The Mighty Angel	Jerzy	
2013	Walesa. Man of Hope	Lech Wałęsa	
2013	Ambassada	Adolf Hitler	
2011	In Darkness	Leopold Socha	
2011	Courage	Alfred	
2010	Little Rose	Roman Rożek	
2010	Kołysanka		
2009	The Dark House	prosecutor Tomala	
2007	All Will Be Well	teacher Andrzej	
2004	Vinci	Robert Cumiński "Cuma"	

== Discography ==
Title	Album details
Struny na Ziemi (Strings on Earth) (with Włodzimierz Pawlik, Lora Szafran and Marek Bałata)	Released: May 22, 2011; Label: Pawlik Relations; Formats: CD
