= Hero of the Year (film) =

1987 Polish film

- Directed by: Feliks Falk
- Written by: Feliks Falk
- Starring: Jerzy Stuhr
- Cinematography: Witold Adamek
- Release date: 23 February 1987
- Running time: 115 minutes
- Country: Poland
- Language: Polish

Hero of the Year (Polish: Bohater roku) is a 1987 Polish drama film directed by Feliks Falk. It was entered into the 15th Moscow International Film Festival where it won the FIPRESCI Prize and a Special Prize. The film was selected as the Polish entry for the Best Foreign Language Film at the 60th Academy Awards, but was not accepted as a nominee.

== Cast ==
- Jerzy Stuhr as Lutek Danielak
- Mieczyslaw Franaszek as Zbigniew Tataj
- Katarzyna Kozak as Majka (as Katarzyna Kozak-Paszkowska)
- Piotr Machalica as Editor Tadeusz Odyniec
- Marian Opania as Chief editor
- Miroslawa Marcheluk as Danka Danielak
- Ryszard Kotys as Kazik Danielak
- Boguslaw Sobczuk as Chodkiewicz
- Michal Tarkowski as Romek Hawalka
- Jerzy Fedorowicz as Comrade Kulepa
- Janusz Józefowicz as Dancer Kajtek
- Krzysztof Krupinski as Mr. Karol

== See also ==
- List of submissions to the 60th Academy Awards for Best Foreign Language Film
- List of Polish submissions for the Academy Award for Best Foreign Language Film
