= Rafał Listopad =

Polish film editor (born 1978)

- Born: 30 April 1978 (age 47); Warsaw
- Occupation: Film editor
- Years active: 2005–present

Rafał Listopad (born 30 April 1978) is a film editor.

== Biography ==
He graduated in film editing from the Łódź Film School.

He was elected a member of Polish Film Academy, European Film Academy and Polish Society of Film Editors (PSM). He became member of the board of the HandMade Pictures post-production studio. He became a lecturer at the Łódź Film School and the Gdynia Film School. He was an expert of Polish Film Institute in 2014 and 2015.

== Filmography ==
- 2005: Oda do radości, novella Morze
- 2006: Statyści
- 2006: Środa, czwartek rano
- 2007: Katyń
- 2008: Poste Restante
- 2008: Giraffe and Rhino Hotel
- 2009: Miłość na wybiegu
- 2010: Maraton tańca
- 2011: Czarny czwartek. Janek Wiśniewski padł
- 2012: Shameless
- 2013: Ambassada
- 2014: Między nami dobrze jest
- 2015: Performer (film)
- 2016: Po prostu przyjaźń
- 2017: Zgoda
- 2017: Volta
- 2018: Odnajdę cię
- 2019: Piłsudski
- 2020: 25 Years of Innocence
- 2022: Strzępy
- 2022: Marzec ’68
- 2023: Doppelgänger
- 2025: Heweliusz

Source.

== Awards ==
For editing the film Oda do radości (2005) he received an award at the Koszalin Festival of Film Debuts "Young People and Film". He earned nominations to Polish Film Awards for best editing for film Katyń and Czarny czwartek. Janek Wiśniewski padł. In 2015 he received Jan Machulski Award for his activities for Polish independent cinema. He won 2021 Polish Film Award for best editing for 25 Years of Innocence. He was nominated to 2024 Polish Film Award for best editing for Doppelgänger.
