= Halina Machulska =

Polish actress (born 1929)

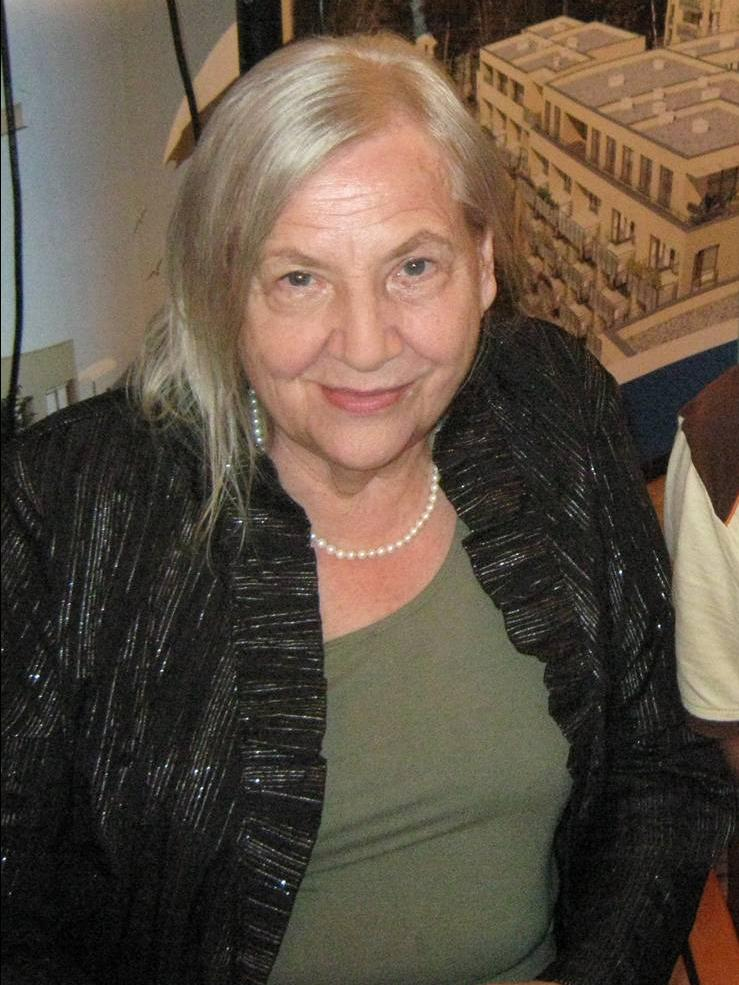
Halina Machulska

Halina Machulska (born March 2, 1929) is a Polish theater, film and television actress.

Machulska is the widow of theater director and actor, Jan Machulski, who died in 2008. The couple's son is Polish film director, Juliusz Machulski. Halina and her husband co-starred together in their son's 1987 film, Kingsajz.

== Filmography ==
- 1998-2003: Miodowe lata - as Lasakowa
- 2000-2001: Miasteczko - as grandmother Ola, mother of Wanda Tarnawska
- 1998: Matki, żony i kochanki II - as Zofia Stokowa, ex-director of nursery school
- 1995: Matki, żony i kochanki - as Zofia Stokowa, ex-director of nursery school
- 1987: Kingsajz - as Ewa's mother
- 1982: Dolina Issy - as Akulonisowa
- 1980: Tylko Kaśka
- 1979: Sytuacje rodzinne: Bezpośrednie połączenie - as Irena Tietz, sister of Halina
- 1979: Tajemnica Enigmy - as a worker in post office
- 1977: Indeks. Życie i twórczość Józefa M. - as mather of Andrzej
- 1965: Wyspa Złoczyńców - as a guide in museum
