= Mirosława Marcheluk =

Polish actress (1939–2025)

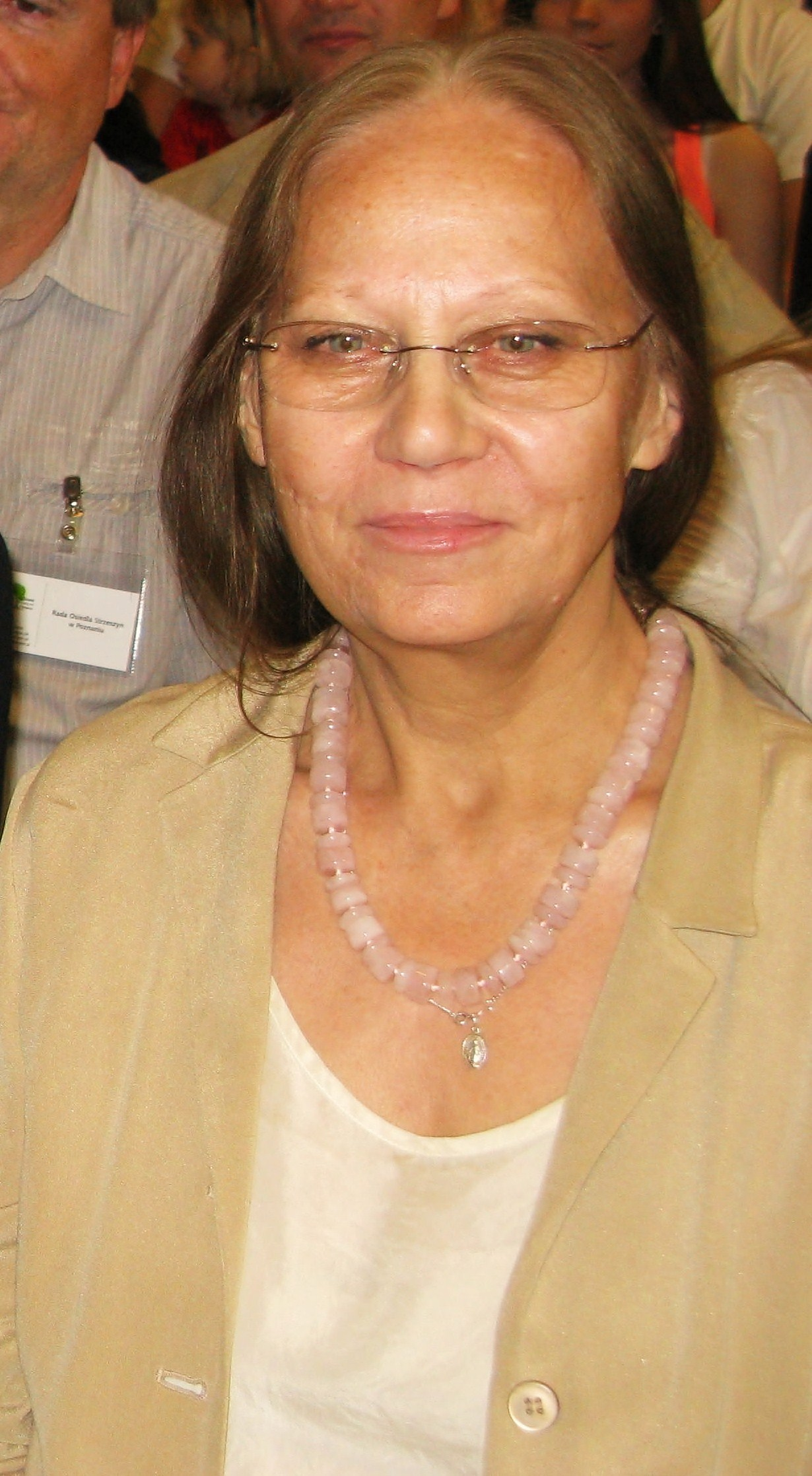
- Mirosława Marcheluk (2012)
- Born: March 11, 1939; Białystok, Republic of Poland
- Died: January 7, 2025 (aged 85)
- Burial place: Farny Cemetery in Białystok
- Occupation(s): Actor, teacher
- Years active: 1960–2025

Mirosława Marcheluk (11 March 1939 – 7 January 2025) was a Polish actress. She had roles in Hero of the Year and Magnat. Marcheluk died on 7 January 2025, at the age of 85.
