= Andrzej Kotkowski =

Polish film director

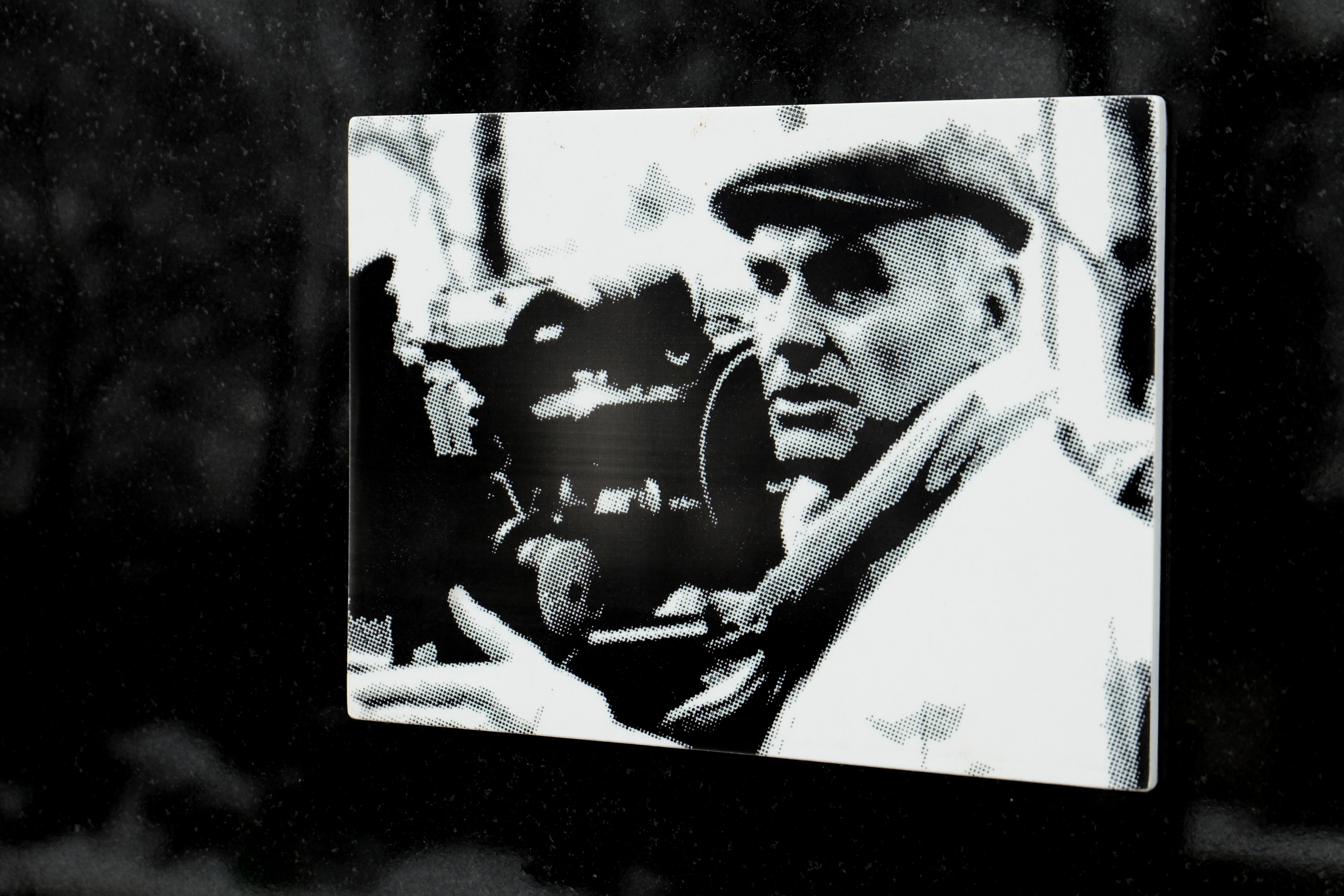
- Kotkowski's grave
- Born: 17 February 1940; Lwów (Lviv), Poland under Soviet occupation (now Ukraine)
- Died: 15 January 2016 (aged 75); Warsaw, Poland
- Occupations: Film director, screenwriter
- Years active: 1972–2009

Andrzej Adam Kotkowski (17 February 1940 – 15 January 2016) was a Polish film director and screenwriter. He directed seventeen films between 1972 and 2009.

== Selected filmography ==
- Olympics 40 (1980)
- Peaceful Years (1981)
- In the Old Manor, or the Independence of Triangles (1984)
- Citizen Piszczyk (1988)
- The attorney's team (1993)
- All the money in the world (1999)
- Women's Dressing Room (2001)
- Life Exam (2005)
- City from the Sea (2009)
