= V.I.P. (1991 film) =

1991 Polish film by Juliusz Machulski

- Directed by: Juliusz Machulski
- Written by: Juliusz Machulski
- Produced by: Juliusz Machulski
- Starring: Wojciech Malajkat; Liza Machulska; Cezary Pazura
- Cinematography: Jerzy Łukaszewicz
- Edited by: Jadwiga Zajiček
- Music by: Krzesimir Dębski
- Release date: 25 October 1991 (Poland)
- Running time: 110 min
- Countries: Poland, Belgium, France
- Language: Polish

V.I.P. is a 1991 Polish -Belgian-French action film directed by Juliusz Machulski .

The film was shot in the following locations: Warsaw, Wilanów, the manor house in Turowa Wola, Paris, Moscow, Gdynia (beach and cliff) [ 1 ] .

Polish premiere of the film: October 25, 1991.

In 2015, the film was digitally restored.

== Plot summary ==
Roman Natorski is a composer. One day, he receives a commission to compose music for Preuss in a hurry. Along the way, he meets Ramus, an old school friend. He offers to drive his car with the woman inside to his home in Masuria. When Roman drives her home, he stays there to write the score and begins an affair with the woman.

At the same time, Ramus and Deputy Minister Delekta are smuggling diamonds into Paris. Both work for a man named Malecki. When Ramus tries to sell them on his own, he is murdered. Grębosz then escapes from prison. Malecki and his entourage arrive at a house in Masuria. Grębosz and Delekta arrive there. Both are murdered, but Malecki is unaware that the murder was accidentally recorded on a camera, which ends up in Romek's possession.

== Cast ==
- Wojciech Malajkat as Roman Natorski
- Liza Machulska as Liza Machulska
- Cezary Pazura as Malyszko
- Beata Tyszkiewicz as Roman's Mother
