= Izabella Cywińska =

Polish director and film critic (1935–2023)

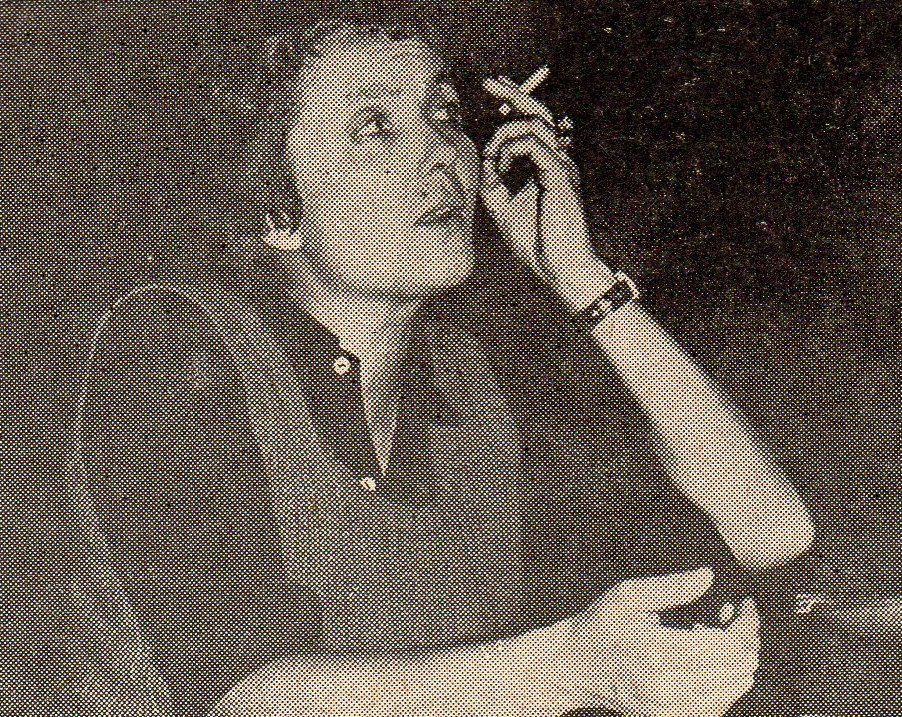
- Cywińskain c. 1987
- Born: 25 March 1935; Lwów, Poland
- Died: 23 December 2023 (aged 88); Poznań, Poland

Maria Izabella Cywińska-Michałowska (25 March 1935 – 23 December 2023) was a Polish theatre and film director and film critic. She was the director of the Wojciech Bogusławski Theatre in Kalisz (1970–1973), the director of the New Theatre in Poznań (1973–1989) and, later, the artistic director of the Ateneum Theatre in Warsaw (2008–2011). In the years 1989–1991 she served as the Polish Minister of Culture and Art.

== Early life and education ==
Izabella Cywińska was born on 25 March 1935 in Lviv, and raised in Kamień Puławski. Her paternal ancestors used the Puchała coat of arms. She studied ethnography at the University of Warsaw, as well as directing at the National Higher School of Theatre in Warsaw.

== Career ==
Cywińska worked as a theatre director at theaters in Białystok, Warsaw and Nowa Huta.

In the years 1970–1973 she was the director of the Wojciech Bogusławski Theatre in Kalisz. In 1973, she reactivated the New Theatre in Poznań, which she managed until 1989. In 1981, she staged the play Oskarżony: czerwiec pięćdziesiąt sześć there. As a consequence, she was interned for several months during the period of martial law (Włodzimierz Braniecki was the co-author of the screenplay). In 2008, after the death of Gustaw Holoubek, she took over the duties of the artistic director at the Ateneum Theatre in Warsaw. She held this position until July 2011.

As a director, she directed Television Theatre plays and film productions (the series Boża podszewka in 1997 and 2004, the films Kochankowie z Marony, Cud purymowy).

From 12 September 1989 to 12 January 1991, she served as Minister of Culture and Art in the Cabinet of Tadeusz Mazowiecki. In 2005, she signed a declaration of support for the Democratic Party, she was also one of the co-authors of its culture program. She was a member of Bronisław Komorowski's support committee before the presidential elections in 2010 and in 2015. She became a member of the Support Committee of the POLIN Museum of the History of Polish Jews in Warsaw.

In 2011, she was decorated with the Officer's Cross of the Order of Polonia Restituta.

== Personal life and death ==
Cywińska was married to actor Janusz Michałowski. She wrote a memoir called Nagłe zastępstwo. Z dziennika pani minister. She also published a diary Dziewczyna z Kamienia.

Izabella Cywińska died on 23 December 2023, at the age of 88.
