= Barbara Skrzypek =

Polish government official (1959–2025)

- Born: Barbara Trojnar; 8 January 1959; Gorlice, Poland
- Died: 15 March 2025 (aged 66); Warsaw, Poland
- Resting place: Gorlice, Poland
- Occupations: Civil servant; secretary; company board member
- Children: 1

Barbara Skrzypek (Polish: [barˈba.ra ˈskʂɘ̟.pɛk]; née Trojnar, Polish: [ˈtrɔj.nar]; 8 January 1959 – 15 March 2025) was a Polish civil servant, secretary, and businessperson. From 1990 to 2020, she was a secretary, and one of the closest co-workers, of Jarosław Kaczyński, the chairperson of the Law and Justice party, one of the most influential parties in the Polish politics. In 2018, she was ranked at the 41st place on the list of the 50 most influential people in Poland by the news magazine Wprost. Since 2020, she was a board member of the Lech Kaczyński Institute, an organisation which is the main shareholder of the media and estate company Srebrna. From 1980 to 1990, she was a clerk in the Office of the Council of Ministers, and from 1989 to 1990, she was a clerk in the Chancellery of the President of the People's Polish Republic.

== Biography ==
Barbara Skrzypek (née Trojnar) was born on 8 January 1959 in the town of Gorlice in Rzeszów Voivodeship, Poland, now located within the Lesser Poland Voivodeship, where she grew up. In 1978, she graduated from the Marcin Kromer 1st General Education High School in Gorlice.

From 1980 to 1989, she was a clerk in the Office of the Council of Ministers in Warsaw, Poland, serving four prime ministers of Poland, Józef Pińkowski, Wojciech Jaruzelski, Zbigniew Messner, and Mieczysław Rakowski. Among other functions, she was a senior office clerk and senior statistician in the Secret Chancellery and also worked in the Prime Minister office, and in the office of the chief of the Office of the Council of Ministers. From 1989 to 1990, she worked in the Chancellery of the President of the People's Polish Republic, as a secretary of Michał Janiszewski, the chief of the chancellery under president Wojciech Jaruzelski.

In 1990, Skrzypek became the secretary, and one of the closest co-workers of Jarosław Kaczyński, the chairperson of the Law and Justice party, one of the most influential parties in the Polish politics. She was also a head of the party chancery and director of the party presidium office.

Skrzypek retired from her position as a secretary in 2020, after working with Kaczyński for almost 30 years. The same year, she became a board member of the Lech Kaczyński Institute, the main shareholder in the media and estate company Srebrna. Previously, until 2018, she was an authorized representative of the institute. Skrzypek herself owned two shares in said company, with her son holding another one.

In 2018, the weekly news magazine Wprost ranked her at the 41st place on their list of the "50 most influential Poles", recognising her as "the most mysterious, and simultaneously one of the most important women in the Polish politics". She became more widely known to the broader public thanks to the 2017 political satire television series The Chairman's Ear (Polish: Ucho Prezesa), revolving around the character of Jarosław Kaczyński. It featured her fictionalised version, addressed as Mrs. Basia, and portrayed by Izabela Dąbrowska.

Skrzypek died on 15 March 2025 in Warsaw from the heart attack, at the age of 66. She was buried on 22 March at the parish cemetery of the Basilica of the Nativity of the Blessed Virgin Mary on Karwacjanów Street in Gorlice.

Three days prior to her death, she was interviewed as a witness by the district office in Warsaw of the public prosecutor's office, in relation to the scandal regarding the estate investments of Srebrna, in which, the company was accused of financial fraud. It sparked widespread media attention, with some public figures such as Jarosław Kaczyński and other senior Law and Justice members claiming that the questioning precipitated her death. Her attorney-in-fact, with whom she arrived for the questioning, have been barred from participating. He had submitted in advance a request for his participation in the interview on the grounds of Skrzypek's poor health. The district public prosecutor had stated the interview was not a criminal interrogation and so did not require the presence of a lawyer, and that while Skrzypek did have poor eyesight and was experiencing stress in relation to the questioning, such health issues were not an insurmountable obstacle to proceedings, and no evidence to the contrary have been provided. However, she did not report any irregularities regarding the interrogation, as evidenced by the transcript disclosed by the public prosecutor's office. Neither Skrzepek nor anyone in her family reported a deterioration in her health as a consequence of the interrogation.

Following her death, the public prosecutor's office issued a statement, declaring no ground for linking her death to the questioning, and an intention to take legal actions against those suggesting the connection between the two events. The matter have been a subject of an official letter by Andrzej Duda, the president of Poland, addressed to prime minister Donald Tusk, demanding the explanation regarding the actions of the public prosecutor's office. The Commissioner for Human Rights also investagated the National Public Prosecutor's Office, regarding Skrzypek's questioning.

On 19 March 2025, Skrzypek was posthumously awarded the Knight's Cross of the Order of Polonia Restituta by president Andrzej Duda for the "outstanding service to the country and society".

== Personal life ==
She had a husband and a son.

== Awards and decorations ==
- Knight's Cross of the Order of Polonia Restituta (2025; posthumously)
