= Lullaby (2010 film) =

- Film poster
- Kołysanka
- Directed by: Juliusz Machulski
- Starring: Robert Więckiewicz; Małgorzata Buczkowska
- Music by: Michał Lorenc
- Release date: 12 February 2010
- Running time: 95 minutes
- Country: Poland
- Language: Polish

Lullaby (Polish: Kołysanka) is a 2010 Polish dark comedy film directed by Juliusz Machulski.

== Plot ==
In the village of Odlotowo in Masuria, local folkloric sculptor Roman Łapszow, owner of a local farm, first mysteriously disappears. In his place, the strange Makarewicz family, composed of pale-faced figures always dressed in black, moves in. Soon, other residents in the area begin to mysteriously disappear: a postman, then a priest and his altar boy, a social worker, and a German man and his translator interested in buying the farm.

== Cast ==
- Robert Więckiewicz as Michal Makarewicz
- Małgorzata Buczkowska as Bozena Makarewicz
- Janusz Chabior as Dziadek Makarewicz
- Filip Ochinski as Wojtek Makarewicz
- Weronika Kosobudzka as Marysia Makarewicz
- Julia Janiszewska as Ola Makarewicz
- Jakub Bargiel as Kuba Makarewicz
- Patryk Bargiel as Kuba Makarewicz
- Krzysztof Kiersznowski as Roman Lapszow
- Jacek Koman as Listonosz
- Ewa Ziętek as Kobieta z opieki spolecznej
- Michał Zieliński as Ksiadz Marek
- Antoni Pawlicki as Ministrant
- Aleksandra Kisio as Tlumaczka
