= Jan Machulski =

Polish theater director

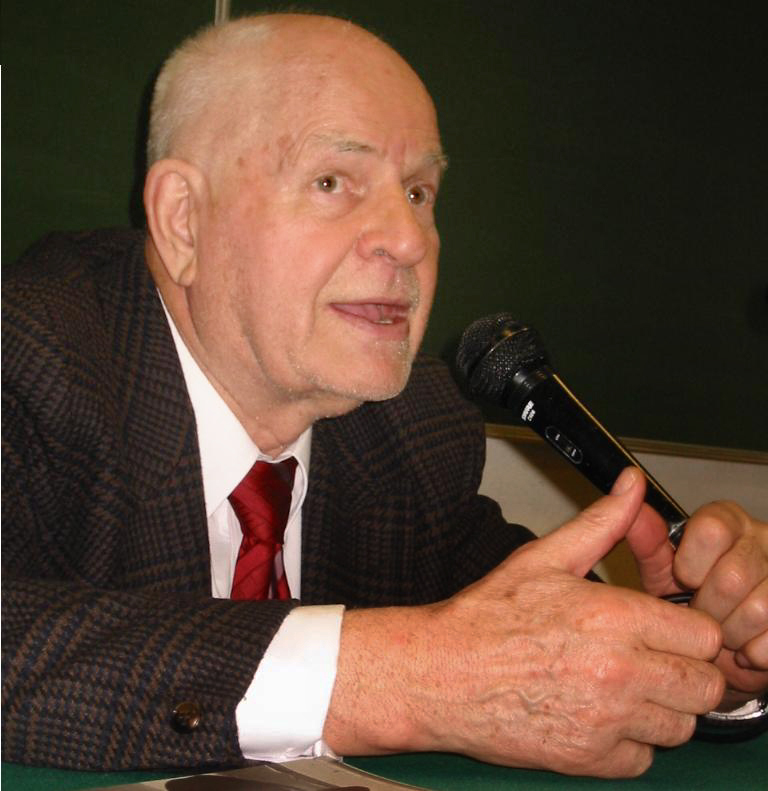
Jan Machulski

Jan Henryk Machulski (3 July 1928 – 20 November 2008) was a Polish theater director, as well as a film and theatrical actor. He appeared in more than 45 film roles and 70 theater roles throughout his career.

== Personal life ==
Machulski was born in Łódź, Poland, on 3 July 1928. He was a graduate of the National Film School in Łódź and the Polish National Acting School.

Machulski was married to Polish actress, Halina Machulska. He was the father of Polish film director Juliusz Machulski and Wojciech Machulski, spokesperson of a polish parliamentary group - Konfederacja.

== Career ==
Machulski pursued a successful dual career in theater directing, as well as acting.

As a theater director, Machulski production credits included the Polish language adaptations of Sen nocy letniej (Midsummer Night's Dream), Antigone (Antygona) and Hamlet. He also produced and directed two of his own original plays, Niebezpieczne zabawy (Dangerous Games) and Lek (Anxiety).

As an actor, Machulski appeared in approximately 70 theatre and 45 film roles over the span of his career. Some of his most noted roles included Rzeczpospolita babska (Womanish Republic), Sublokator (Lodger) and Psy (Dogs), Ostatni dzień lata (The Last Summer's Day), Rękopis znaleziony w Saragossie (A Manuscript Found in Saragossa) and Lalka (Doll).

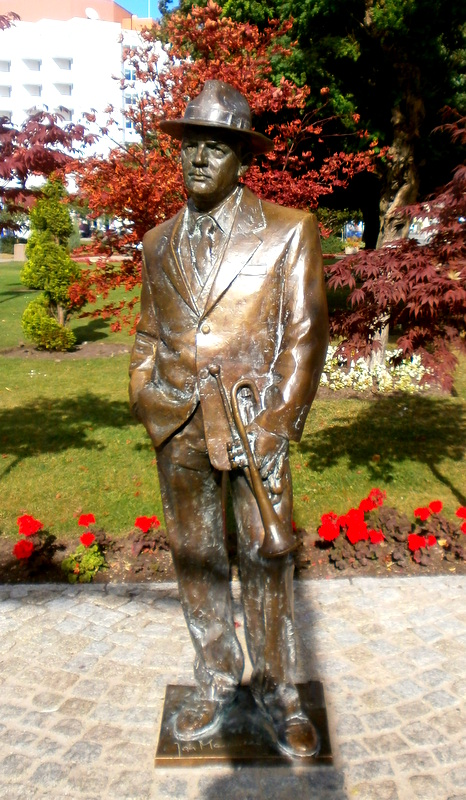
Jan Machulski monument in Międzyzdroje

Machulski appeared in a number of television shows and plays specifically for children. He appeared in the popular children's television series, Przygody Pana Samochodzika (Mr. Car Adventures) and in Podroz za jeden usmiech (A Trip for a Smile). He also played the main character in Wyspa Złoczyncow (Thieves Island).

Machulski and his son, director Juliusz Machulski, collaborated and worked together on several different films. Their first collaboration occurred in 1981 when he appeared in the film, Vabank, which was directed by Juliusz Machulski. Machulski went on to star in several of his son's other films, including Kingsajz (Kingsize), Deja vu, Kiler (Killer) and Vinci.

Machulski served as the dean of the National Film School Acting Faculty for many years. He was a recipient of the Polish Golden Order of Merit.

== Death ==
Jan Machulski died of a heart attack in Warsaw, Poland, on 20 November 2008, at the age of 80.
