= Boża podszewka =

Boża podszewka ("God's Lining") and Boża podszewka. Część druga ("God's Lining. Part Two") are Polish TV series based on the novel with the same title by Teresa Lubkiewicz-Urbanowicz about the life of petty szlachta in the backwaters of the Vilnius Region. The first part was aired in 15 episodes during 1997–1998 and covered the time period 1900-1945. The second part was aired in 16 episodes during 2005-2006 and covered the time period 1945-1948. It was the debut work of Izabella Cywińska as film director.

When the airing started, the series caused a considerable controversy across the whole Poland among the people originating from the Kresy region, which the Vilnius Region was part of. They claimed that the series created a distorted, unflattering image of the people from the Vilnius region.

== Etymology ==
The Polish expression "Boża podszewka" ("God's lining") is a dismissive reference to an unimportant, disregarded person. In an afterword to one of the editions of the book Lubkiewicz-Urbanowicz wrote that in Vilnius Region the expression referred to the last, unwanted, child. In the book and film, the protagonist Marianna/Maryśka is exactly that: the last of nine children, physically weak, treated by parents worse than her siblings.
