= Jacek Chmielnik =

Polish actor

Jacek Chmielnik (January 31, 1953, in Łódź, Poland – August 22, 2007, in Suchawa, Poland) was a Polish stage and film actor.
