= Juliusz Machulski =

Polish film director, screenwriter and producer (born 1955)

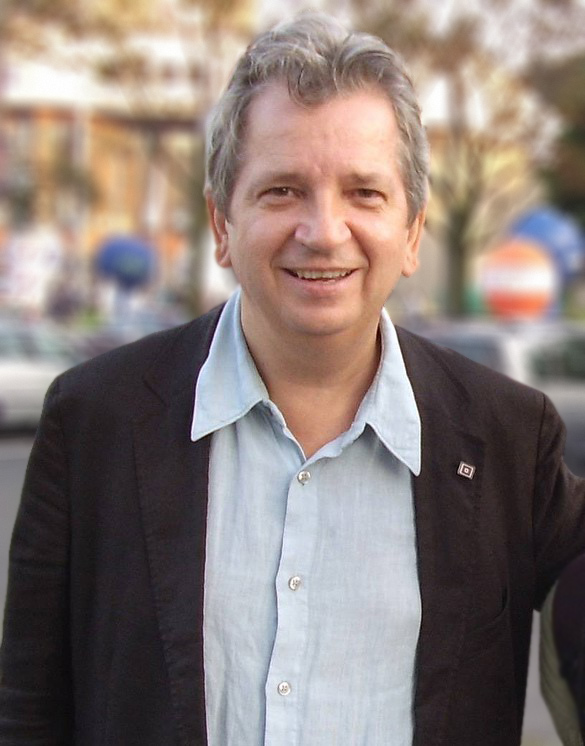
- Born: 10 March 1955 (age 71); Olsztyn, Poland
- Education: National Film School in Łódź
- Occupations: Film director; producer; screenwriter; actor
- Years active: 1981–present

Juliusz Machulski (born 10 March 1955 in Olsztyn) is a Polish film director, screenwriter, producer and actor. Son of noted actor Jan Machulski, he became notable for his comedies ridiculing the life in communist-ruled Poland of the 1970s and 1980s. He is a member of the European Film Academy and the founder of the Zebra Film Studio. In 2014, he was awarded the Officer's Cross of the Order of Polonia Restituta.

== Life and career ==
Juliusz Machulski was born 10 March 1955 in Olsztyn, Poland, to parents, Jan Machulski and Halina Machulska.

In 1973, he moved to Warsaw, where he was admitted to the Polish Philology faculty of the Warsaw University. However, in 1975 he moved to Łódź, where he graduated from the Łódź Film School. His film debut was Vabank (1981), a comedy describing a story of two Polish gangsters of the 1930s. The film was a striking success, as was the science-fiction comedy Seksmisja of 1984. Often seen as either a golden child or enfant terrible of the Polish cinema, Machulski quickly became one of the most popular Polish directors, both in Poland and abroad. His Seksmisja, although significantly shortened by the Soviet censorship, was one of the most popular pictures shown in the Soviet Union in mid-1980s. Kingsajz, a fantasy comedy made in 1987 remains one of his most important movies till date due to its great social significance. It is in many ways similar to Seksmisja but Kingsajz's message is stronger and more evident. It was also released at the time when anti-communistic society was very enthusiastic about pictures of that kind. Slogans from the film were appearing on many real walls, much to police's irritation. His ventures just after 1989 were still popular with the masses but none of them was critically acclaimed. His pictures of that time are often called "rude" in opposition to his earlier "intelligent" work. After his Matki, żony i kochanki, a television series many judged the end of director who failed to adapt to new environment. In 1997 he proved those opinions to be wrong when his Kiler became a huge hit and is now considered as cult movie along with its sequel, Kiler-ów 2-óch. Both movies are crime comedies about a simple taxi driver taken by a police for a famous killer.

Since 1988 Machulski served as the headperson of Zebra Film Studio, he also briefly appeared in a number of films as an actor. On 10 December 1998 he was honoured with his own star paved in Piotrkowska Street in Łódź.

== Filmography ==
- Vabank (1981)
- Sexmission (1984)
- Vabank II czyli Riposta (1984)
- Kingsajz (1987)
- Déjà vu (1990)
- V.I.P. (1991)
- Szwadron (1992)
- Girl Guide (1995)
- Matki, żony i kochanki (1995)
- Kiler (1997)
- Kiler-ów 2-óch (1999)
- Pieniądze to nie wszystko (2000)
- Superprodukcja (2003)
- Vinci (2004)
- Ile waży koń trojański (2008) release date - 26 December
- Kołysanka (12.02.2010)
- Ambassada (2013)
- Volta (2017)
- Vinci 2 (2025)

== Awards ==
- 1981 - Prize for Best Debut Director at the Polish Film Festival in Gdynia (for Vabank)
- 1984 - Main prize Silver Lions at the same festival (for Seksmisja)
- 1984 - Golden Thaler at the Polish Film Festival (for Seksmisja)
- 1995 - Grand Prix Golden Lions for Girl Guide at the Polish Film Festival
- 1997 - Audience Award for Kiler at the Polish Film Festival
- 2004 - Individuell Award for Vinci (script) at the Polish Film Festival
