= Zdzisław Kuźniar =

Polish theater, film, and television actor

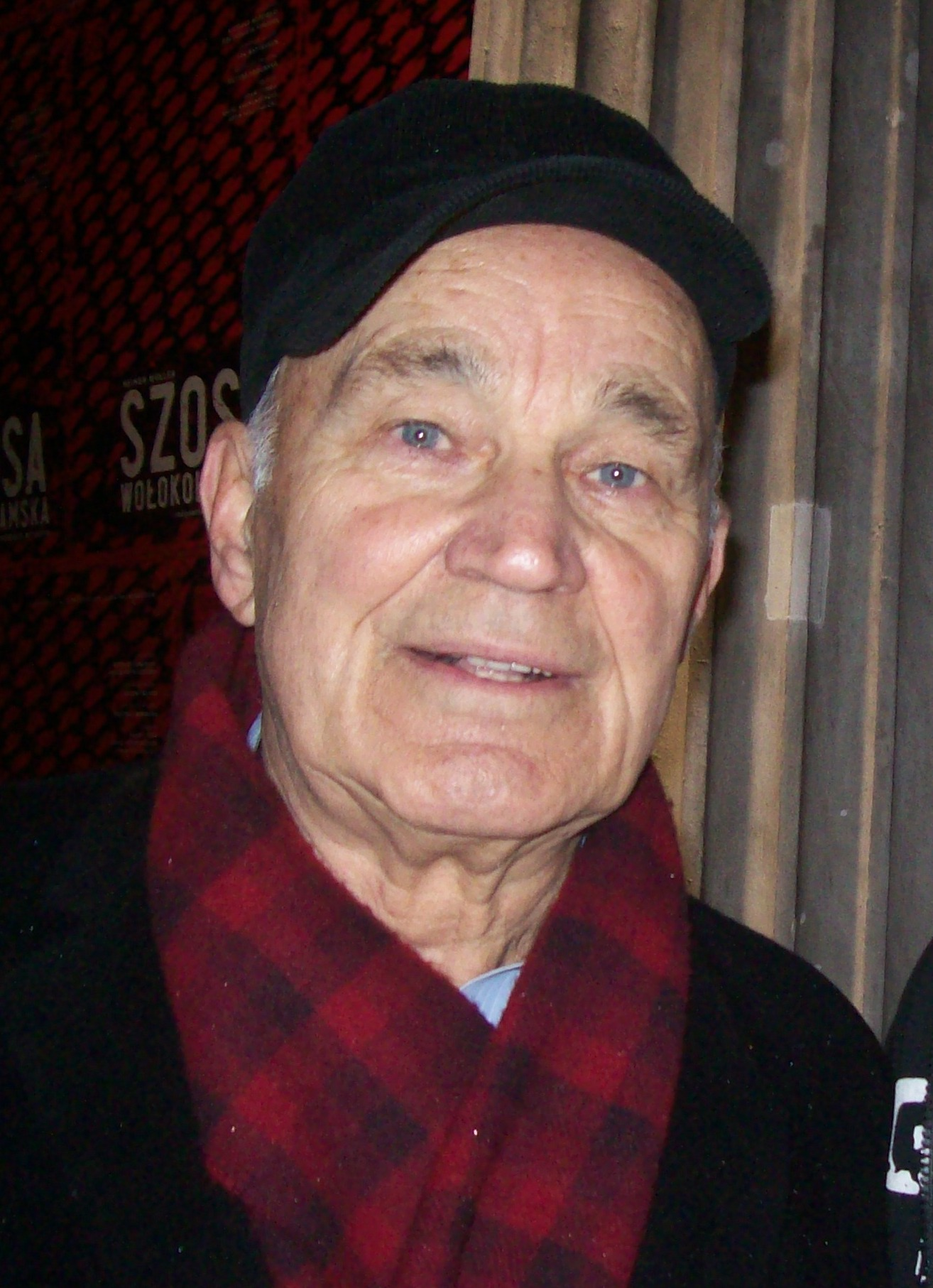
Zdzisław Kuźniar in 2010

Zdzisław Kuźniar (born 26 July 1931, in Free City of Danzig, now Gdańsk, Poland) is a Polish theater, film and television actor.

Kuźniar graduated from the Ludwik Solski Academy for the Dramatic Arts in Kraków. That same year he debuted theatrically in the role of the butler prince in the play Intrigue and Love by Friedrich Schiller, directed by Alexander Gąssowskiego at the Polish Theatre in Poznań.

He has performed on many theatre stages in Poznań, Gdańsk, and Wrocław.
