= Sławomir Szczęśniak =

Polish musician, satirist, actor, and journalist (born 1961)

- Born: 27 September 1961 (age 65); Warsaw, Poland
- Education: University of Warsaw; Warsaw University of Life Sciences
- Occupations: Musician, satirist, actor, journalist
- Years active: 1989–present
- Children: 2
- Musical career
- Genre: Hip hop
- Occupations: Singer, songwriter
- Member of: T-raperzy znad Wisły

Sławomir Szczęśniak (Polish: [swaˈvɔ.mir ˈʂt͡ʂɛw̃ɕ.ɲak, ˈʂt͡ʂɛɲɕ.ɲak]; born 27 September 1961) is a Polish musician, satirist, actor, and journalist. He co-created and co-hosted the TVP2 satirist shows Za chwilę dalszy ciąg programu (1989–1994) and KOC – Komiczny odcinek cykliczny (1995–2000). Szczęśniak is a member of the hip-hop band T-raperzy znad Wisły, which was co-founded by him in 1995 together with Andrzej Butruk, Lucyna Malec, and Grzegorz Wasowski, originally operating until 2000, and being reactivated in 2009. From 2019 to 2022, he portrayed Janusz Paździoch, one of the main characters on the Polsat sitcom television series The Lousy World.

== Biography ==
Sławomir Szczęśniak was born on 27 September 1961 in Warsaw, Poland. He graduated from the Warsaw University of Life Sciences, and later did post-graduate studies at the Faculty of Journalism of the University of Warsaw. In the 1980s, Szczęśniak was a journalist of the Polish Radio Three. In 1989, together with Jakub Strzyczkowski, he hosted an airing of the radio programme Radio Three Chart. Later, Szczęśniak worked as a journalist for the Polish Television where he co-created and co-hosted the TVP2 satirist shows Za chwilę dalszy ciąg programu (1989–1994), KOC – Komiczny odcinek cykliczny (1995–2000), and KAC – Komiczna audycja cykliczna (2001). In 2013, he also hosted the TV4 entertainment show Mega Chichot.

Szczęśniak voiced Bernie, a secondary character in Polish-language dubbed version the 2004 animated adventure film Shark Tale. In 2012, he also appeared in an episode of the TVP2 drama television series Barwy szczęścia. From 2019 to 2022, Szczęśniak portrayed Janusz Paździoch, one of the main characters on the Polsat sitcom series The Lousy World.

Szczęśniak is also a member of the hip-hop band T-raperzy znad Wisły, which released six albums. Founded in 1995 together with Andrzej Butruk, Lucyna Malec, and Grzegorz Wasowski, it operated until 2000, and was reactivated in 2009. In 1997, he wrote, composed, and performed a theme song for a pilot of the animated children's series Dynastia Miziołków. Szczęśniak also wrote songs "Czarny sport" and "Żużlu mój" for the 2020 sports drama film Speedway, having also performed in a chorus of the former. Additionally, he also works in advertising agencies and as party host.

== Personal life ==
Szczęśniak was married twice, having a son from each relationship.

== Filmography ==
Year	Title	Role	Notes	Ref.
1997	Dynastia Miziołków	—N/a	Television series; episode: "Rocznica ślubu dziadków"; songwriter, composer, and singer	
1989–1994	Za chwilę dalszy ciąg programu	Himself (co-host)	Comedy show; also co-showrunner	
1995–2000	KOC – Komiczny odcinek cykliczny	Himself (co-host)	Comedy show; also co-showrunner	
2001	KAC – Komiczna audycja cykliczna	Himself (co-host)	Comedy show; 10 episodes; also co-showrunner	
2004	Shark Tale	Bernie	Feature film; voice; Polish-language dubbed version	
2011	Barwy szczęścia	Dachshund's owner	Television series; episode no. 686	
2013	Mega Chichot	Himself (host)	Comedy show	
2019–2022	The Lousy World	Janusz Paździoch	Television series; main role; 43 episodes	
2020	Speedway	—N/a	Feature film; songwriter and singer	
