= Renata Pałys =

Polish actress

- Born: Renata Wilkowska; 12 October 1956 (age 69); Wrocław, Poland
- Education: National Academy of Theatre.
- Occupations: Actress; Director
- Years active: 1977–present
- Spouse: Krzysztof Pałys (m. 1982)
- Children: 1

Renata Pałys (Polish: [rɛˈna.ta ˈpa.wɘ̟s]; née Wilkowska, Polish: [vilˈkɔf.ska]; born 12 October 1956) is a stage and television and actress, and theater director. She is best known for her role as Helena Paździochowa, one of the main characters in the sitcom television series The Lousy World (1999–2022).

== Biography ==
Renata Pałys (née Wilkowska) was born on 12 October 1956 in Wrocław, Poland, where she grew up. Her parents were artist Henryk Wilkowski and Mira Wilkowska. In 1980, she graduated from the Wrocław Faculty of Puppetry of the National Academy of Theatre.

She performed in the Cyprian Kamil Norwid Theatre in Jelenia Góra from 1980 to 1981, the Wrocław Modern Theatre in 1981, the Wrocław Pantomime Theatre from 1982 to 1987, and the Kalambur Theatre in Wrocław from 1987 to 1989. From 1993 to 1993 she wrote for the cultural section of the Wrocław-based edition of news magazine Gazeta Wyborcza.

She appeared for the first time in a feature film in 1977 Indeks as an extra. Since then she had numerous backgrounds film roles between 1977 and 1996. From 1999 to 2021 she portrayed Helena Paździochowa, one of the main characters in a sitcom television series The Lousy World. She also directed one episode, and together with Adek Drabiński co-directed another four. She also had numerous smaller roles in television series such as in Adam i Ewa (2001), Samo życie (2003), Na Wspólnej (2004), First Love (2005, 2009, 2011), Crime Wave (2006), Family.pl (2013), and Policemen (2021).

From 2008 to 2013 she wad manager of the rock band All Sounds Allowed. From 2009 to 2012 she thought acting, and in 2015, she has founded the Wreszcie charity foundation, which supports actors over the age of 55. She is also theatre play director.

On 27 March 2022, the mayor of Wrocław, Jacek Sutryk, has honoured her work and artistic accomplishments with the Super Diamond award.

== Private life ==
In 1982 she married Krzysztof Pałys, with whom, she has a son.

== Filmography ==
=== Films ===
Year	Title	Role	Notes
1977	Indeks		
1980	Ukryty w słońcu		
1982	Wielki Szu		
1984	I Like Bats	Party attendant	Uncredited
1984	Sezon na bażanty	Party attendant	
1984	Dom Sary		
1985	Problemat profesora Czelawy	Prostitute	Uncredited
1985	By Touch		
1985	Na całość		
1986	Ucieczka	Woman dragged out of an ambulance	
1986	Pusta klatka		
1986	Mewy (fragmenty życiorysu)	Prostitute	
1989	Konsul	Nurse	
1989	Szklany dom		
1993	Magneto	Witch doctor	
1993	Obcy musi fruwać	Train passenger	
1994	Johnnie Waterman	Dead man's wife	
1997	Deszczowy żołnierz	Charity event attendant	
2022	Hela	Librarian	
2023	Ucieczka z miasteczka	Marta's mother	Short film

=== Television series ===
Year	Title	Role	Notes
1999–2021	The Lousy World	Helena Paździochowa	Main role; also director on 5 episodes
2001	Adam i Ewa	Bank employee	
2003	Samo życie	Customer service director	
2004	Na Wspólnej	Babysitter candidate	Episode no. 250
2005	First Love	Actress	Episode no. 3235
2009	First Love	Marysia Radosz, a cat owner	6 episodes
2011	First Love	Zofia Zabawa	3 episodes
2005	Tango z aniołem	Flat owner	
2006	Crime Wave	Kamila Cupryś's mother	Episode: "Chwasty" (no. 51)
2009	Rajskie klimaty	Aldona Słupska	
2012	Galeria	Client	Ep no. 163
2013	Family.pl	Małgorzata Kożuchowska, an estate agent	Episode: "Czyżby koniec" (no. 130)
2021	Policemen	Mrs. Halina, an eyewitness	Episode no. 802
