= Nasze dzieci =

Nasze dzieci ("Our Children" in Polish) may refer to:

- Polish title of the 1946 Yiddish-language Polish film Unzere kinder
- Charity organized by Polish actress Ewa Gorzelak-Dziduch
