= Mularczyk =

Mularczyk is a Polish surname, it may refer to:

- Adam Mularczyk (1923–1996), Polish theatre director
- Andrzej Mularczyk (1930–2024), Polish writer
- Arkadiusz Mularczyk (born 1971), Polish politician
- Barbara Mularczyk (born 1984), Polish actress
