= Ferdynand Feldman =

Polish actor

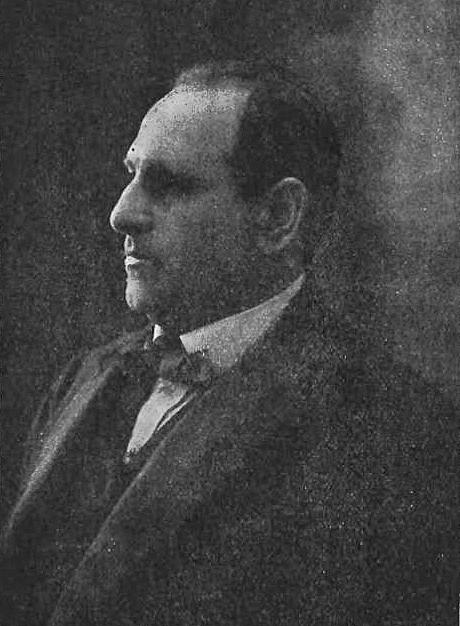
- Born: Ferdynand Feldman; 1862; Kraków, Austrian Empire
- Died: 3 June 1919 (aged 56–57); Lwów, Poland
- Occupation: Actor
- Years active: 1881–1919

Ferdynand Feldman (1862 – 3 June 1919) was a Polish-Jewish theatre actor known at the turn of the 19th and 20th century. He was also a father of a renowned Polish actress Krystyna Feldman.

== Biography ==
Feldman studied at the Jan Matejko Academy of Fine Arts in Kraków, after at the Derynga drama school in Warsaw. From 1881, he appeared in the Kraków theatre, playing first the role of footmen. Due to his hort and stock posture, he was initially successful in comedies, farces and operettas.

Feldman played in garden theatres, in Warsaw, Kraków, Poznań, Lublin, Częstochowa and Łódź. In 1890 he was involved in the ensemble of the Grand Theatre in Lwów (Lemberg), where he performed for twenty-five years. In the years 1916–19 he worked in the Juliusz Słowacki Theatre in Kraków.

He probably took part in the Polish-Ukrainian battle of Lemberg (Lwów, Lviv), (in Polish historiography known also as defense of Lwów), standing on the Polish side (his wife was Polish).

The attention of the critics was caught by his creations in the works of Aleksander Fredro (he played Benet, Chamberlain, Geldhab and Radost). Feldman often played the character of Napoleon Bonaparte and Tadeusz Pawlikowski, however, started casting the actor in dramatic roles, which allowed Feldman to develop his talent. His biggest roles are Bos in Hope and Bezsiemionow in Mieszczanach. The actor was characterized by a great diction, using gestures and facial expressions, he significantly differentiated his characters, built a character using small details and props.

== Personal life ==
Ferdynand Feldman was a Polish Jew, and before his marriage to opera singer Katarzyna Sawicka at Saint Nicholas Church in Lwów, he accepted the Catholic baptism and converted to Roman Catholicism. He was also father of actress Krystyna Feldman.

He is buried at the Lychakiv Cemetery.
