= Scott Taylor (writer) =

Australian writer

Scott Taylor is an Australian writer.

In the mid-1990s he was script producer and story editor on Neighbours.

Working for Fremantle Media he helped develop the show Na Wspólnej.

== Select Credits ==
- Neighbours - story editor (1996–97), script producer, writer
- Home and Away - story editor (1998–99, 2010), writer
