= Na Wspólnej =

Polish television soap opera

- Genre: Soap opera
- Created by: Sue Green, Dorota Chamczyk
- Written by: Marcin Cząba (head writer); Scott Taylor
- Directed by: Urszula Urbaniak
- Starring: Grażyna Wolszczak; Tomasz Schimscheiner; Robert Kudelski; Anna Korcz; Renata Dancewicz; Wojciech Majchrzak; Ewa Gawryluk; Waldemar Obłoza; Bożena Dykiel; Mieczysław Hryniewicz
- Theme music composer: Krzesimir Dębski; Grzegorz Daroń
- Country of origin: Poland
- Original language: Polish
- No. of seasons: 25
- No. of episodes: 4,282

Production
- Executive producer: Dariusz Gąsiorowski
- Running time: 25 minutes (without adverts)

Original release
- Network: TVN
- Release: 27 January 2003

Na Wspólnej (Polish pronunciation: [na ˈfspulnɛj], "On Wspólna Street") is a Polish television soap opera. It premiered on 23 January 2003 on TVN as has become its flagship primetime weekday series. It is loosely based on the Hungarian production Barátok közt and it follows the lives of the inhabitants of an apartment block in Wspólna Street, Warsaw. Episodes tend to last around 20 minutes (without commercials).

The series is shot almost entirely in Warsaw and produced by the Polish branch of Fremantle Media. Na Wspólnej is the second Polish television series to exceed the number of 4,000 episodes.

== Cast and characters ==
Actor	Role	Status
Bożena Dykiel	Maria Zięba	2003–2025
Mieczysław Hryniewicz	Włodzimierz Zięba	2003–
Katarzyna Ptasińska	Beata Wójcik	2017–
Grzegorz Kwiecień	Paweł Wójcik	2018–
Julian Studziński	Gucio Wójcik	2022–
Marta Jankowska	Renata Dziedzic	2006–
Mariusz Słupiński	Sławomir Dziedzic	2007–
Maja Andrzejczuk (2008–2013)	Daria Dziedzic	2008–2013, 2017, 2020–
Patrycja Topajew (2017, 2020–)	Daria Dziedzic	2008–2013, 2017, 2020–
Lilianna Jakubowska	Nina Raczka	2021–
Nadia Elwatorska (2021–2022)	Zosia Raczka	2021–
Julia Horyń (2022–)	Zosia Raczka	2021–
Anna Guzik	Żaneta Zięba – Szulc	2004, 2005–
Wojciech Błach	Wojciech Szulc	2011–
Zuzanna Kaszuba	Marysia Szulc	2006–
Gustaw Marczak	Ludwik Szulc	2017–
Sylwia Gliwa	Monika Cieślik	2003–
Waldemar Błaszczyk	Damian Cieślik	2010–
Stanisław i Tomasz Karnowscy (2011–2013)	Kajetan Cieślik	2011–
Mikołaj Szostek (2013–)	Kajetan Cieślik	2011–
Wojciech Brzeziński	Bogdan Berg	2012–
Anna Cieślak	Joanna Berg	2013–
Wojciech Rotowski	Jarosław Berg	2012–
Katarzyna Chorzępa	Eliza Berg	2014–
Jan Leśniewski	Jarek „Junior” Zawada	2020–
Pola Żak	Hanusia	2020–
Julia Chatys	Katarzyna Berg – Żbik	2012–
Michał Mikołajczak	Dariusz Żbik	2016–
Natan Czyżewski	Franciszek Berg	2012–
Zoe Messy	Michalina Berg	2016–
Halina Rasiakówna	Róża Paprocka	2003–2009, 2011, 2022, 2025–
Grażyna Wolszczak	Barbara Brzozowska	2003–
Łukasz Konopka	Krzysztof Smolny	2011–
Michał Tomala	Daniel Brzozowski	2003–
Nicola Czerniecka	Ada Brzozowska	2023–
Fryderyk Szczebel (2003–2007)	Jakub Brzozowski	2003–
Kacper Łukasiewicz (2008–)	Jakub Brzozowski	2003–
Ignacy Knuth-Sznajder (2014–2015, 2018–2019)	Grzegorz Smolny	2014–2015, 2018–2019, 2023–
Jakub Tofil (2023–)	Grzegorz Smolny	2014–2015, 2018–2019, 2023–
Magdalena Alexander	Natalia Smolna	2014–2015, 2018–2019, 2023, 2024–
Robert Kudelski	Michał Brzozowski	2003–
Lidia Sadowa	Iga Przybysz	2018–
Bartłomiej Kaszuba	Ignacy Brzozowski	2008–
Artur Wesołowski (2023)	Nadia Brzozowska	2023–
Marcelina Sałek (2024–)	Nadia Brzozowska	2023–
Anna Korcz	Izabela Brzozowska	2003–2022, 2023, 2024, 2025–
Wojciech Wysocki	Jerzy Dudek	2007–2015, 2017–2021, 2025–
Karolina Brzosko (2009–2013)	Klementyna Dudek	2009–2021, 2025–
Julia Kostov (2013–2021)	Klementyna Dudek	2009–2021, 2025–
Anna Samusionek	Ilona Zdybicka	2009, 2012, 2013–2014, 2015–
Michał Szyszkowski (2015–2016)	Wiktorek Brzozowski	2015–
Kajetan Borowski (2016–2021)	Wiktorek Brzozowski	2015–
Waldemar Obłoza	Roman Hoffer	2003–
Aleksandra Konieczna	Honorata Leśniewska	2008–
Kazimierz Mazur	Kamil Hoffer	2003–
Magdalena Kaczmarek	Łucja Agier	2023–
Anna Niedźwiecka (2013–2018)	Ula Hoffer	2013–
Sherazade Wolff (2018–2021)	Ula Hoffer	2013–
Julia Jurek (2022–)	Ula Hoffer	2013–
Marsel Kanchavali (2023)	Ania Hoffer	2023–
Kornelia Krynicka (2023–)	Ania Hoffer	2023–
Joanna Jabłczyńska	Marta Leśniewska	2003–
Krzysztof Wieszczek	Mikołaj Leśniewski	2009–
Jakub Wojnarowicz (2008–2009)	Ksawery Konarski	2008–
Maciej Poppe (2009–2018)	Ksawery Konarski	2008–
Adam Tomaszewski (2018–)	Ksawery Konarski	2008–
Mateusz Górka (2013–2014)	Stefan Leśniewski	2013–2014, 2016–2019, 2021–
Oliwier Bedyński-Michta (2016–2019)	Stefan Leśniewski	2013–2014, 2016–2019, 2021–
Gabriel Pakieser (2021–)	Stefan Leśniewski	2013–2014, 2016–2019, 2021–
Ewa Gawryluk	Ewa Ostrowska	2003–
Marek Kalita	Arkadiusz Ostrowski	2011–
Aleksander Kalczyński	Maciek Rybak	2024–
Jakub Wesołowski	Igor Nowak	2003–
Sonia Mietielica	Anka	2024–
Lena Jonik (2010–2013)	Julia Nowak	2010–
Maja Oświecińska (2014–)	Julia Nowak	2010–
Kazimierz Wierzbicki	Janek Nowak	2025–
Lucyna Malec	Danuta Zimińska	2005–
Grzegorz Gzyl	Marek Zimiński	2005–
Oliwia Glanowska (2017–2018)	Szymon Zimiński	2017–
Tadeusz Kawęcki (2018–)	Szymon Zimiński	2017–
Anna Kerth	Małgorzata Zimińska	2005–2008, 2009, 2010–2012, 2013, 2015–2020, 2022–
Jakub Świderski	Błażej Rybiński	2016–2020, 2022–
Ksawery Płomiński (2017–2018)	Mareczek Rybiński	2017–2018, 2022–
Edward Jędruch (2022–)	Mareczek Rybiński	2017–2018, 2022–
Marta Wierzbicka	Aleksandra Zimińska	2005–2017, 2019, 2022–
Mariusz Zaniewski	Mariusz Czerski	2013–2015, 2023–
Maja Mobrouk	Alan Novak Junior	2023–
Klementyna Karnkowska	Amelia Czerska	2023–
Jakub Wiszniewski	Alan Novak	2022–
Małgorzata Lipmann	Lidia Czerska	2013–2014, 2023–
Renata Dancewicz	Weronika Roztocka	2003–
Gabriela Jeżółkowska	Antosia Roztocka	2004–
Krystian Perdjon (2011–2017)	Kacper Roztocki	2011–
Tomasz Archacki (2017–)	Kacper Roztocki	2011–
Monika Obara	Ada Wróblewska	2012–2013, 2015, 2025–
Katarzyna Walter	Agnieszka Cheblewska	2006–
Tadeusz Huk	Ryszard Cheblewski	2015–
Martyna Dudek	Malwina Cheblewska	2016–2019, 2022–
Bartosz Głogowski	Sebastian Cheblewski	2015–
Dawid Czupryński	Bruno Krawczyk	2014–
Małgorzata Peczyńska	Helena Kopeć	2005–
Janusz Chabior	Artur Jaśkiewicz	2009–
Izabela Dąbrowska	Teresa Bednarczuk	2009–
Marcin Przybylski	Miro	2013–
Łukasz Wójcik	Tymon Życiński	2015–
Dariusz Wnuk	Robert Tadeusiak	2016–
Piotr Cyrwus	Zdzisław Muszko	2016–
Tomasz Piątkowski	Tomasz Adamski	2017–
Zbigniew Suszyński	Przemysław Gwiazda	2017–
Mariusz Zalejski (2014–2015)	Rafał Cielecki	2014–2015, 2019–
Jacek Kawalec (2019–)	Rafał Cielecki	2014–2015, 2019–
Agnieszka Korzeniowska	Eliza's mother	2014–2015, 2019–
Dariusz Niebudek	Andrzej Zakościelny	2021–
Magdalena Kacprzak	Justyna Zakościelna	2021–
Jakub Pruski	Tadeusz Zakościelny	2021–
Zuzanna Wieleba	Marysia Zakościelna	2021–
Przemysław Sadowski	Lew Nalepa	2021–
Karolina Michałus	Maja Maszecka	2021–
Robert Wrzosek	Jerzy "Szark" Szarkowski	2021–
Magdalena Majtyka	Jagoda Janowicz	2021–
Filip Czyżykowski	Norbert „Decybel”	2022–
Michał Lupa	„Wałek”	2022–
Maciej M. Tomaszewski	Karol Wolski	2022–
Jan Jakubik	Dariusz „Dex” Wolski	2022–
Julia Mika	Łucja „Luśka” Czech	2022–
Jowita Chwałek	Alicja Myszkowska	2022–
Sylwia Wysocka	Teresa Boska	2017, 2022–
Piotr Jankowski	Adrian Baliszewski	2015, 2016, 2020, 2023–
Maja Wolska	Brygida Miałczycka	2023–
Marcelina Sałek (2023)	Oliwia Miałczycka	2023–
Melisa Lesiczka (2024–)	Oliwia Miałczycka	2023–
Dorota Krempa	Aneta Siwek	2016–2021, 2023–
Adrianna Ładno	Hela Szczęsna	2023–
Paweł Dobek	Tomasz Gębowski	2023–
Bartosz Gomoła	Antek Karłowicz	2023–
Małgorzata Knothe	Krystyna Agier	2023–
Alicja Kalinowska	Kaja Kasprzyk	2023–
Katarzyna Dominiak	Matylda Joniec	2023–
Przemysław Cypryański	Jakub Wójcicki	2024–
Agnieszka Bogdan	Tamara Wójcicka	2024–
Anna Dereszowska	Judyta Bradecka	2023, 2024–
Patrycja Franczak	Wiola Wawer	2024–
Aleksandra Radwan	Agata Kochańska	2017–2020, 2024, 2025–
Miłosz Kwiecień	Staś Tadeusiak	2016–2018, 2020–2021, 2025–
Piotr Fronczewski (voice)	Wiktor Brzozowski	2003
Ewelina Ruckgaber	Sylwia Muszyńska	2003
Roksana Krzemińska	Małgorzata Reiman	2003
Marta Wiśniewska	Katarzyna Sarnecka	2003, 2004
Joanna Kurowska	Krystyna Michalska	2004
Ewa Skibińska	Joanna Rawska	2003–2004
Wojciech Starostecki	Marcin Dembiński	2004
Mariusz Pudzianowski	Przemas Zieliński	2004
Julia Pietrucha	Alicja/Julia Furga	2003–2004
Bohdan Łazuka	Lucjan Romani	2003–2004
Agnieszka Krukówna	Iwona Gładczyńska	2003–2005
Piotr Szwedes	Maciej Romani	2004–2005
Anna Grycewicz	Beata Sobolewska	2004–2005
Marcin Władyniak	Konrad Bartczak	2003–2005
Dariusz Kordek	Krzysztof Burza	2003, 2005
Olga Borys	Jola	2005
Agata Moszumańska	Anna Bednarczyk	2004–2005
Ewa Gorzelak	Gabriela Nowak	2003–2005
Krzysztof Wakuliński	Oskar Madejski	2003–2006
Maria Pakulnis	Sylwia Madejska	2005–2006
Agata Holc	Suzy Wysocki	2004–2006
Joanna Kupińska	Wiktoria Stahl	2004–2006
Filip Bobek	„Długi”	2006
Łukasz Nowicki	Zygmunt Kraszewski	2006
Matylda Damięcka	Karolina Brzozowska	2003–2005, 2006, 2007
Hanna Bieniuszewicz	Mirosława Mierzejewska	2006–2007
Edyta Herbuś	Urszula	2006–2007
Grzegorz Wojdon	Wojciech Latałko	2006–2007
Alan Andersz	Paweł	2006–2007
Michał Lesień	Przemysław G. Wiśniewski	2007
Jakub Przebindowski	Karol Kopczyński	2006–2007
Robert Janowski	Robert Malczewski	2003–2006, 2007
Artur Chamski	Patryk	2007–2008
Paulina Klimaszewska	Paula	2007–2008
Nina Czerkies	Lena Twardochleb	2008
Sara Stachowiak	Tamara Twardochleb	2008
Andrzej Deskur	Piotr Mierzejewski	2006–2008
Wojciech Alaborski	Jan Roztocki	2006–2008
Sylwia Oksiuta	Lidia Śmigielska	2007–2008
Jacek Borkowski	Mariusz Pęczek	2008
Agnieszka Czekańska	Alicja Domaniewska	2008–2009
Sylwia Juszczak	Reni Sadowska	2005, 2008–2009
Krzysztof Kalczyński	Jeremi Konarski	2007–2009
Jacek Poniedziałek	Tadeusz Nowicki	2009
Leszek Lichota	Grzegorz Zięba	2004–2006, 2007–2008, 2009
Izabela Noszczyk	Adela Wyrwał	2008–2009
Maciej Wierzbicki	Julian Szczęsny	2009
Wojciech Kowman	Tomasz Milewski	2009
Anna Karczmarczyk	Anna	2007–2010
Mateusz Mikołajczyk	Wojtek	2009–2010
Maciej Marczewski	Darek Kosiński	2009–2010
Joanna Liszowska	Anita Wrzos	2010
Wojciech Medyński	Robert Wrzos	2010
Patricia Kazadi	Beata Dolniak	2009–2010
Monika Zalewska	Marianna	2005, 2010
Tomasz Gęsikowski	Bartosz Walczak	2009–2010
Katarzyna Kurylońska	Agata	2010
Bożena Adamek	Bożena Dziedzic	2008–2011
Katarzyna Misiewicz	Marzena Dziedzic	2008–2011
Małgorzata Pieczyńska	Iga Konarska	2007–2011
Ewa Kania	Dominika	2007–2011
Joanna Moro	Edyta Dudek	2006–2008, 2009, 2011
Piotr Skarga	Szalej	2011
Jacek Rozenek	Eryk Kuśnierz	2010–2011
Monika Fronczek	Dorota	2010–2011
Dominika Figurska	Nina Lassota	2011
Andrzej Blumenfeld	Hubert Leszczyński	2006–2008, 2010–2011
Marek Lewandowski	Mirosław Czubak	2010–2011
Monika Sołubianka	Jolanta Czubak	2010–2011
Maciej Jachowski	Piotr Czubak	2010–2011
Paweł Deląg (2003, 2005, 2006)	Sebastian Petrus	2003, 2005, 2006, 2010–2011
Robert Jarociński (2010–2011)	Sebastian Petrus	2003, 2005, 2006, 2010–2011
Tomasz Dedek	Gerard	2011
Paweł Ferens	Jacek Dolniak	2009–2012
Radosław Pazura	Janusz Gajewski	2010–2012
Dorota Chotecka	Sylwia Gajewska	2011–2012
Stefano Terrazzino	Ricardo	2012
Agnieszka Żulewska	Maja Kochanowska	2008–2009, 2012
Marcin Troński	Wiktor Kiertyczak	2011–2012
Małgorzata Rożniatowska	Jadwiga	2011–2012
Kinga Ilgner	Anna	2011–2012
Paweł Marczuk	Aleks Krajewski	2009–2010, 2012
Weronika Książkiewicz	Laura Pawłowska	2010, 2012
Bronisław Biziuk	Patryk Gajewski	2010–2013
Michał Gadomski	Bartek Krzeptowski	2003–2004, 2013
Agata Piotrowska-Mastalerz	Tosia Gryzoń	2009–2013
Katarzyna Pyszyńska	Emilia Gryzoń	2009–2013
Aleksander Dąbrowa	Jaś Gryzoń	2010–2013
Mikołaj Roznerski	Olivier	2012–2013
Karolina Nolbrzak	Magdalena Żebrowska	2009–2013
Dobromir Dymecki	Kazimierz Adamiak	2013
Matylda Paszczenko	Milena Krauss	2011–2013
Joanna Trzepiecińska	Betty Sulinsky	2013
Rafał Cieszyński	Paweł Woliński	2012–2014
Jerzy Schejbal	Tadeusz Zieliński	2011–2014
Agata Góral	Dagmara Kamińska	2011–2014
Ewa Serwa	matka Magdy	2010–2014
Mirosław Oczkoś	Staszek Kopeć	2006–2008, 2010, 2011–2012, 2014
Aleksandra Mikołajczyk	Iwona Majewska	2011–2012, 2014
Teresa Sawicka (2003–2004, 2006)	Janina Kosowska	2003–2004, 2006, 2014
Wanda Neumann (2014)	Janina Kosowska	2003–2004, 2006, 2014
Jan Jankowski	Mieczysław Burzyński	2010–2011, 2014–2015
Wacław Warchoł	Szymon	2010–2012, 2014–2015
Zbigniew Stryj	Adam Roztocki	2005–2015
Tadeusz Falana	Henryk Solski	2015–2016
Aleksandra Justa	Klara Solska	2015–2016
Dagmara Bryzek	Paulina Nowaczyk	2015–2016
Patryk Bukalski	Tomasz Grudniewski	2015–2016
Renata Berger	Helena Smolna	2014–2016
Katarzyna Kołeczek	Julia Zdrojewska	2015–2016
Rafał Gerlach	Leszek Malewicz	2015–2016
Piotr Michalski	Radosław Wichrowski	2015–2016
Wojciech Pokora	Stanisław Niemirowicz	2016
Mirosław Baka	Janusz Szymaniak	2016
Kamila Salwerowicz	Teresa Miśkowiec	2016
Krzysztof Bochenek	Zdzisław Babiński	2016
Igor Obłoza	Konrad	2012–2016
Przemysław Wyszyński	Indiana	2012–2016
Dorota Kuduk	Dagmara	2012–2016
Julia Trembecka	Klaudia Bracka	2016
Ilona Lewandowska	Gabi	2015, 2017
Sylwia Boroń	Miśka Jarecka	2016–2017
Jadwiga Gryn	Wika Szymańska	2016–2017
Andrzej Niemirski	Jakub Marcinek	2015–2017
Anna Maria Jarosik	Dominika	2017
Magdalena Łoś	Łucja Pruska	2014–2017
Daria Burakowska	Barbara Kornacka	2016–2017
Malwina Dubowska	Zofia Kornacka	2016–2017
Sasha Strunin	Natasza	2018
Ilona Wrońska	Kinga Brzozowska	2003–2018
Hanna Stankówna	Ludwika Magnowska	2008–2015, 2018
Wojciech Duryasz	Henryk Magnowski	2011–2015, 2018
Adam Malecki (2005)	Marcin Galik vel Woźniak	2005, 2018
Kamil Maćkowiak (2018)	Marcin Galik vel Woźniak	2005, 2018
Laura Breszka	Natalia Popławska	2017–2018
Laura Breszka	Lena Williams	2018–2019
Wiktoria Wolańska	Ada Poznańska	2018–2019
Karolina Nowakowska	Kalina Jędrzejczyk	2016–2017, 2019
Michał Więckowski	Rafał Jędrzejczyk	2016–2017, 2019
Karol Pocheć	Sylwek Jędrzejczyk	2016–2017, 2019
Michał Jurkowski	Joachim Trzciński	2017–2019
Ostap Stupka	Antoni Siemieniuk	2017–2019
Jowita Budnik	Alicja Siemieniuk	2018–2019
Tomasz Schimscheiner	Andrzej Brzozowski	2003–2014, 2015, 2016, 2017, 2019
Maciej Brzoska	Olaf Kubicki	2014–2019
Michał Malinowski	Norbert Owczarek	2014–2019
Agnieszka Michalska	Agata	2012
Agnieszka Michalska	Wiktoria Kleczewska	2019–2020
Olha Bosova	Tatiana Uszak	2019–2020
Michalina Robakiewicz	Sandra Gawriłow	2015–2020
Mariusz Ochociński	Michaił Gawriłow	2015–2020
Łukasz Matecki	Piotr Kornacki	2015–2017, 2019–2020
Ewa Audykowska	Alicja Kornacka	2015–2017, 2020
Piotr Nowak	Marcin Bialski	2014–2020
Gabriela Frycz	Olga Tadeusiak	2016–2018, 2020–2021
Jan Pęczek	Henryk Kopeć	2006–2008, 2011–2012, 2014–2015, 2017, 2019, 2021
Rita Raider	Jagoda Myszkowiak	2020–2021
Maria Semotiuk	Sara Jaśkiewicz	2010–2012, 2021
Krzysztof Franieczek	Edward Krenz	2020–2021
Monika Pikuła	Lidia Warecka	2021
Sandra Staniszewska	Klaudia Sobieraj	2021
Lech Mackiewicz	Rafał Sobczak	2008–2015, 2016, 2017, 2018, 2021
Karolina Bacia	Anastazja Trzcińska	2017–2021
Kamil Błoch	Paweł Świerczek	2019–2020, 2021
Karolina Oldyńska	Monika Brzeska	2019–2021
Grzegorz Wons (2010–2011)	Henryk Cieślik	2010–2011, 2015, 2021
Jan Piechociński (2015, 2021)	Henryk Cieślik	2010–2011, 2015, 2021
Katarzyna Galica	Agata Sadowska	2004–2005
Katarzyna Galica	Ita	2021
Mateusz Gąsiewski	Dominik Kamiński	2011–2018, 2020, 2021
Wojciech Majchrzak	Leszek Nowak	2003–2006, 2009–2010, 2016–2017, 2018, 2019, 2021
Mateusz Burdach	Kostek	2021
Maciej Kujawski	Stefan Dębek	2008–2011, 2013–2021
Marcin Rogacewicz	Adam Namysłowski	2020–2022
Robert Tondera	Marcin Bielik	2003
Robert Tondera	Mateusz Osuchowski	2022
Marta Walesiak	Paulina Nalepa	2022
Ołeh Sawkin	Borys Orłow	2008–2012, 2022
Magdalena Nieć	Oksana Krajewska	2009–2010, 2012, 2022
Kamil Krawczykowski (2004–2005)	Tomasz Nowak	2004–2005, 2016–2022
Krzysztof Chodorowski (2016–2022)	Tomasz Nowak	2004–2005, 2016–2022
Adrian Załęgowski	Sylwek Mazurek	2021–2022
Bartłomiej Kraszewski	Jan Warecki	2021–2022
Karolina Matej	Bella Trojanowska	2021–2022
Maria Niklińska	Nicole Sulinsky	2011–2019, 2021, 2022
Elżbieta Gaertner	Irena Kłosowska	2005, 2006, 2008, 2011–2012, 2018, 2022–2023
Katarzyna Wajda	Anna Kolenda	2017–2023
Paulina Chapko	Elżbieta Marcinek	2015–2023
Hoai Nam Trinh	Pan Van	2016–2018, 2021, 2023
Piotr Ligienza	Emil Larsson	2021–2023
Magdalena Celmer	Natalia Górska	2021–2023
Pola Kowalska (2021–2022)	Zuzia Górska	2021–2023
Weronika Kurek (2023)	Zuzia Górska	2021–2023
Dariusz Karpiński	Tomasz Myszkowski	2022–2023
Julia Kamińska	Roma Lenarska	2017–2019, 2023
Bogusława Pawelec	Bożena Wielgosz	2012–2013, 2015, 2023–2024
Olgierd Jaworski	Jarogniew Bratny	2019, 2021–2022, 2023–2024
Wojciech Skibiński	Edward Leśniewski	2009, 2024
Małgorzata Socha	Zuzanna Hoffer	2006–2022, 2024
Piotr Czarnecki	Jan Kłódkowski	2022–2023, 2024
Alicja Warchocka	Mela Chojnacka	2021–2023, 2024
Eryk Cichowicz	Przemysław Smolny	2014–2015, 2018–2022, 2023, 2024
Katarzyna Ucherska	Dagmara Świerczek	2019–2020, 2021, 2023–2024
Antek Bartuzin	Kacper Świerczek	2021, 2023–2024
Julia Lewenfisz-Górka	Tosia Lipiec	2015–2020, 2023–2024
Adam Fidusiewicz	Maks Brzozowski	2003–2009, 2012–2021, 2023, 2024
Marcin Chochlew	Filip Konarski	2003–2012, 2014–2015, 2016, 2019, 2020–2021, 2023–2024
Anna Kózka	Martyna Szulc	2012, 2023–2024
Julia Lewenfisz-Górka	Tosia Lipiec	2015–2020, 2023–2024
Ada Szczepanik	Alina Urbańska	2024
Katarzyna Żak	Halina Dębek	2008–2011, 2013–2021, 2024
Katia Paliwoda	Dorota Rybak	2024
Katarzyna Krzyszkowska-Sut	Alicja Sobierajska	2023–2025
Vitalik Havryla	Natan Sobierajski	2024–2025
Justyna Karłowska	Klaudia Grzesiak	2025

Main Characters currently; Other characters

More information about the cast is available here: https://filmpolski.pl/fp/index.php?film=1211953

=== Original characters ===
Karolina Brzozowska (Matylda Damięcka), Weronika Wilk (Renata Dancewicz), Maria Zięba (Bożena Dykiel), Maks Brzozowski (Adam Fidusiewicz), Bartek Krzeptowski (Michał Gadomski), Ewa Nowak (Ewa Gawryluk), Monika Zięba (Sylwia Gliwa), Gabriela Góralczyk (Ewa Gorzelak), Włodzimierz Zięba (Mieczysław Hryniewicz), Marta Hoffer (Joanna Jabłczyńska), Izabela Brzozowska (Anna Korcz), Michał Brzozowski (Robert Kudelski), Leszek Nowak (Wojciech Majchrzak), Kamil Hoffer (Kazimierz Mazur), Roman Hoffer (Waldemar Obłoza), Andrzej Brzozowski (Tomasz Schimscheiner), Daniel Brzozowski (Michał Tomala), Igor Nowak (Jakub Wesołowski), Konrad Bartczak (Marcin Władyniak), Barbara Brzozowska (Grażyna Wolszczak), Kinga Malczyk (Ilona Wrońska). (Bold characters appear in the series).

== Series list ==
Series	Broadcast interval	Episodes	Season premiere	Season end
1	Winter–Summer 2003	1–131 (131)	27 January 2003	26 August 2003
2	2003/2004	132–330 (199)	1 September 2003	2 July 2004
3	2004/2005	331–506 (176)	6 September 2004	31 August 2005
4	2005/2006	507–670 (164)	5 September 2005	22 June 2006
5	2006/2007	671–833 (163)	4 September 2006	21 June 2007
6	2007/2008	834–994 (161)	3 September 2007	19 June 2008
7	2008/2009	995–1145 (150)	1 September 2008	28 May 2009
8	2009/2010	1146–1302 (157)	7 September 2009	10 June 2010
9	2010/2011	1303–1465 (163)	6 September 2010	16 June 2011
10	2011/2012	1466–1622 (157)	5 September 2011	7 June 2012
11	2012/2013	1623–1779 (157)	3 September 2012	13 June 2013
12	2013/2014	1780–1926 (147)	2 September 2013	29 May 2014
13	2014/2015	1927–2127 (201)	1 September 2014	27 August 2015
14	2015/2016	2128–2335 (208)	31 August 2015	1 September 2016
15	2016/2017	2336–2539 (204)	5 September 2016	31 August 2017
16	2017/2018	2540–2737 (198)	4 September 2017	30 August 2018
17	2018/2019	2738–2933 (196)	3 September 2018	29 August 2019
18	2019/2020	2934–3080 (147)	2 September 2019	28 May 2020
19	2020/2021	3081–3280 (200)	1 September 2020	31 August 2021
20	2021/2022	3281–3478 (198)	1 September 2021	25 August 2022
21	2022/2023	3479–3677 (199)	29 August 2022	17 August 2023
22	2023/2024	3678–3870 (193)	28 August 2023	14 August 2024
23	2024/2025	3871–4068	26 August 2024	14 August 2025
24	2025/2026	4069–4267 (199)	25 August 2025	20 August 2026
25	2026/2027	4268–	31 August 2026	
