= Sweet Noise =

Polish musical group

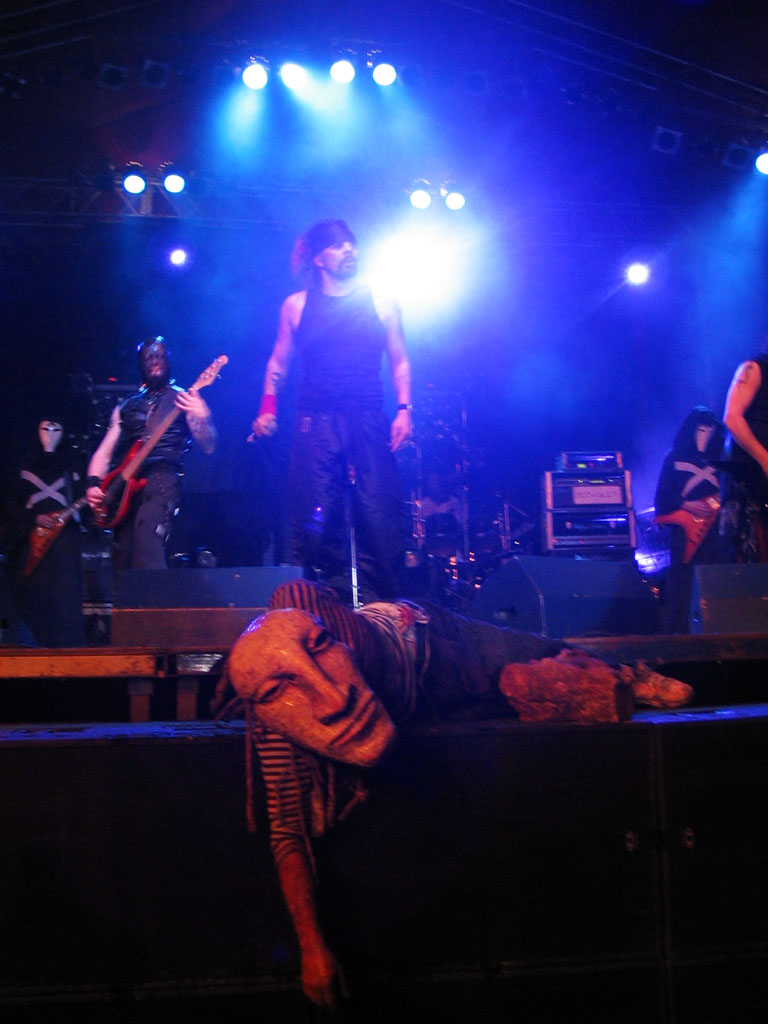
- Sweet Noise playing live

Background information
- Origin: Poland
- Genres: Alternative metal, electronic rock, industrial metal
- Years active: 1990–2008
- Labels: Jazz'N'Java, Noise Inc., EMI Music Poland, PolyGram Poland, Universal Music Poland, Izabelin Studio
- Members: Piotr "Glaca" Mohamed; Tomasz "DJ Kostek" Kościelny; Vahan Bego
- Past members: Tomasz "Magic" Osiński; Henry Tod; Krzysztof "Docent" Raczkowski; Mikołaj "Emef" Fajfer; Tomasz "Balbina" Maćkowiak; Bartłomiej "Fido" Czerniachowski; Maciej "Ślepy" Głuchowski; Tomasz "DEM" Molka; Karol "Toy" Skrzyński; Robert "Cipis" Gasperowicz; Maciej "Żuk" Żebrowski; Maciej Szymański; Tomasz "Letki" Letkiewicz; Robert "Waluś" Walczak; Jan "Yach" Wróblewski; Grzegorz "Bigozz" Bigosiński; Jarosław "China" Łabieniec
- Website: sweetnoise.org

Sweet Noise is a Polish alternative metal band. The group was formed in 1990 in Swarzędz. They have released eight CDs (included two international versions) and appeared three times at the Przystanek Woodstock festival with the special show in 2003 when more than 400,000 people watched the culmination of what the band refers to as conceptual art of Revolta White Shock. The leader and creator of the band is Peter "Glaca" Mohamed. Mohamed is the singer, musician, performer, producer and conceptual artist. He developed an experimental, multimedia project Noise Inc.. He is also involved in project Serce with Toshi Kasai and M.T.void which is a musical outfit run by Mohamed and Justin Chancellor, the bass player of Tool.

== Discography ==
=== Studio albums ===
Title	Album details	Peak chart positions
Title	Album details	POL
Respect	Released: 30 January 1995; Label: Izabelin Studio; Format: CD, CS	—
Getto	Released: 13 May 1996; Label: Izabelin Studio, PolyGram Poland; Format: CD, CS	—
Ghetto	Released: 30 May 1997; Label: PolyGram Poland; Format: CD, CS	—
Koniec wieku	Released: 13 November 1998; Label: Universal Music Poland; Format: CD, CS	—
The End of Century	Released: 8 November 1999; Label: Universal Music Poland; Format: CD, CS	—
Czas ludzi cienia	Released: 3 August 2002; Label: Jazz'N'Java, Noise Inc., EMI; Format: CD, CS	9
Revolta	Released: 8 November 2003; Label: Jazz'N'Java, Noise Inc., EMI; Format: CD	10
The Triptic	Released: 6 July 2007; Label: Noise Inc., EMI; Format: CD, CD+DVD, digital download	14
"—" denotes a release that did not chart.

=== Video albums ===
Title	Video details
Przystanek Woodstock Revolta	Released: 2004; Label: Złoty Melon; Formats: DVD

=== Music videos ===
Year	Title	Directed	Album
1995	"Godność"	—	Respect
1995	"Cisza"	—	Respect
1996	"Wyżej"	Yach Paszkiewicz	Getto
1996	"Bruk"	Jacek Taszkowski, Leszek Molski	Getto
1997	"Ghetto"	Jacek Taszkowski, Leszek Molski	Getto
1998	"W imię Boga"	Pilmotwórnia, Paweł Althamer, Grzegorz Matusik	Koniec wieku
1998	"Płomień życia"	Pilmotwórnia, Paweł Althamer, Grzegorz Matusik	Koniec wieku
2002	"Dzisiaj mnie kochasz, jutro nienawidzisz" (with Anna Maria Jopek)	Mikołaj Górecki	Czas ludzi cienia
2002	"Nie było"	Mikołaj Górecki	Czas ludzi cienia
2002	"N.U.E.R.H.A."	Mikołaj Górecki	Czas ludzi cienia
2003	"Jeden taki dzień" (with Peja)	Mikołaj Górecki, Piotr Mohamed	Revolta
2004	"Nie było" (with Edyta Górniak)	Michał Gazda, Piotr Mohamed	Revolta
2007	"Sympathy for the devil part 666"	Mikołaj Górecki	The Triptic
2007	"Give It All Away"	Piotr Mohamed, Mikołaj Górecki, Łukasz Urbanowski	The Triptic
