= Urszula Urbaniak =

Polish filmmaker and television director (born 1962)

- Born: 27 December 1962 (age 63); Oświęcim, Poland
- Years active: 1994–present
- Spouse: Simon M. Rosenberg (m. 1995)
- Children: Max Rosenberg

Urszula Urbaniak (born 27 December 1962) is a Polish filmmaker and television director.

Urszula Urbaniak graduated in directing from the National Film School in Łódź (PWSFTviT) in 1991. She then went on to gain an M.A. in Directing at the National Film and Television School in the United Kingdom. She has directed shorts, documentaries and several dramas for Polish television. Those dramas include Nina (1994), Górski Hotel (from Václav Havel's play, 1995), Myra Gets Married (from F. Scott Fitzgerald, 1996) and Room 303 (1997).

In 1999, her film The Junction (Torowisko) won several awards including First Film Special Distinction at the Montréal World Film Festival, the Jury Prize at the Sarajevo Film Festival and the Audience Award at the Torino International Festival of Young Cinema.

She has since worked on several Polish TV productions including Na Wspólnej, Egzamin z Życia and Odwróceni.
