= Natalia Rybicka =

Polish actress (born 1986)

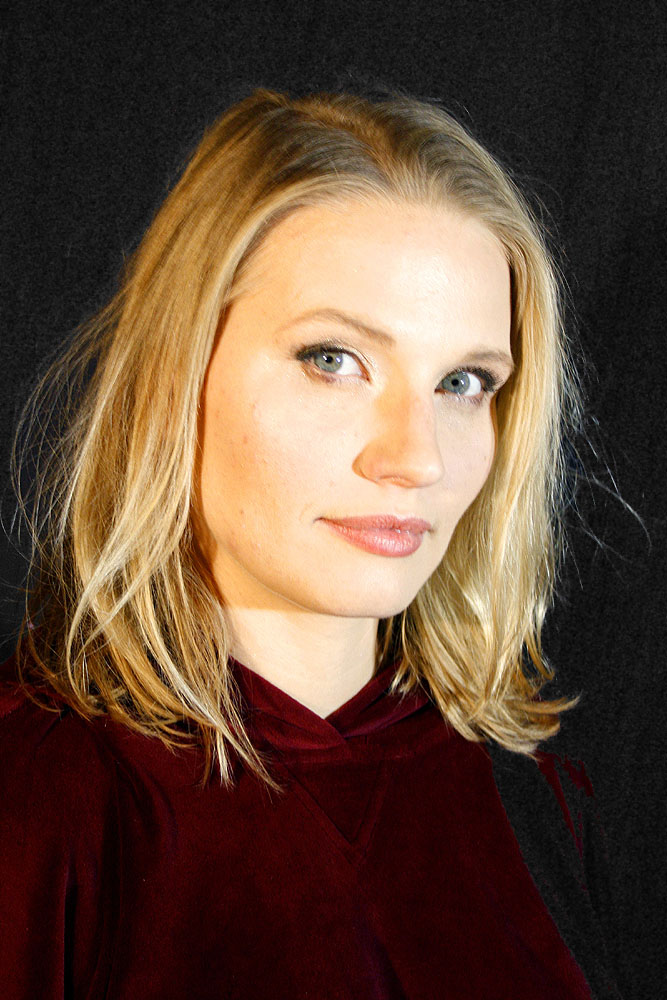
- Rybicka in 2021
- Born: 1 October 1986 (age 39); Warsaw, Poland
- Education: Aleksander Zelwerowicz National Academy of Dramatic Art
- Occupation: Actress
- Years active: 2001 – present
- Spouse: Michał Sobociński
- Children: 1

Natalia Rybicka (Polish: [naˈta.lja rɘ̟ˈbit͡s.ka]; born 1 October 1986) is a Polish film, television, and stage actress.

== Biography ==
Natalia Rybicka was born on 1 October 1986 in Warsaw. In 2010, she graduated from the Aleksander Zelwerowicz National Academy of Dramatic Art in Warsaw. From 2011 to 2012, she performed in the Contemporary Theatre in Warsaw, and since then, in the Studio Theatre in Warsaw. She trained in modern dance, classical ballet, and disco. Rybicka is a member of the Polish Film Academy.

She appeared in feature films such as White Soup (2003), The Doubles (2006), Who Never Lived (2006), All Will Be Well (2007), Time of Darkness (2008), The Christening (2010), Syberiada polska (2012), Excentrycy, czyli po słonecznej stronie ulicy (2015), Black Mercedes (2019), and Lesson Plan (2022), as well as in television series such as Więzy krwi (2001), Samo życie (2002–2006), L for Love (2003–2004, 2015), Plebania (2005), Odwróceni (2007), The Londoners (2008–2009), Father Matthew (2009, 2011, 2020), Mountain Rescue Team (2010), Szpilki na Giewoncie (2011–2012), True Law (2014), The Blonde (2016–2019), and Shadow Play (2024). She also voice acted in Polish-language dubbing, most notably, portraying Tinker Bell in her film series.

== Personal life ==
She is married to a camera operator Michał Sobociński, with whom she has a daughter, Helena.

== Filmography ==
=== Films ===
Year	Title	Role	Notes
2002	Amalia		Short film
2003	White Soup	Iwonka	Feature film
2006	The Doubles	Ola	Feature film
2006	Olek	Ola	Feature film
2006	Pastorałka	Ewa	Television play
2006	Pastorałka	Christmas caroler	Television play
2006	Sahar		Short film
2006	Who Never Lived	Kasia	Feature film
2007	All Will Be Well	Jolka	Feature film
2007	Oskarżeni. Śmierć sierżanta Karosa	Beata Towińska	Television play
2008	Avalanche	Camilla	Feature film
2008	Expecting Love	Girl with flower	Feature film
2008	Time of Darkness	Karolina	Feature film
2009	The Perfect Guy for My Girlfriend	Girl	Feature film
2010	The Christening	Marta	Feature film
2011	Onder Ons	Agnieszka	Feature film
2012	The Fifth Season of the Year	Hitchhiker	Feature film
2012	Syberiada polska	Sylwia Korcz	Feature film
2012	Wiem, że nie śpisz	"Her"	Short film
2015	Excentrycy, czyli po słonecznej stronie ulicy	Modesta Nowak	Feature film
2017	Invisible	Seamstress	Feature film
2019	Black Mercedes	Celina Ratajczak	Feature film
2019	Dzień gniewu	Julia Chomin	Television series
2019	The Turtle Cave	Lover	Short film
2021	Siostry	Sister	Television play
2022	Lesson Plan	Monika Idziorek	Feature film
2023	Salzburska kolekcja zoologiczna	Felińska	Feature film

=== Television series ===
Year	Title	Role	Notes
2001	Więzy krwi	Marysia Bronowicz	
2002–2006	Samo życie	Agata Rowicka	11 episodes
2003	L for Love	Eliza	3 episodes
2003	Lokatorzy	Julia	Episode: "W roli ojca wystąpi..., część 2" (no. 172)
2004	Na dobre i na złe	Sandra Barska	Episode: "Autokuracja" (no. 182)
2015	Na dobre i na złe	Aneta Gniewosz	5 episodes
2005	Crime Detectives	Girl	Episode: "Błękitny pokój"
2005	Plebania	Marta	11 episodes
2006	The Doubles	Ola	Miniseries
2007	Odwróceni	Lidka Sikora	10 episodes
2008–2009	The Londoners	Asia Koryn	26 episodes
2009	Father Matthew	Agnieszka	Episode: "Egzamin" (no. 29)
2011	Father Matthew	Agata Lisowska	Episode: "Adrenalina" (no. 80)
2020	Father Matthew	Klaudia Piątek	2 episodes
2010	Mountain Rescue Team	Justyna Tarnowska	12 episodes
2011–2012	Szpilki na Giewoncie	Agnieszka Lipnicka	16 episodes
2012	Hotel 52	Beata Bartniewska	Episode no. 43
2013	Komisarz Alex	Agnieszka Gordon	Episode: "Dlaczego Romeo zginął?" (no. 38)
2020	Komisarz Alex	Ewelina Sokół	Episode: "Jaszczurka" (no. 165)
2014	True Law	Julia Nawrocka	4 episodes
2015	Firefighters	Kasia	3 episodes
2016–2019	The Blonde	Sylwia Kubus	38 episodes
2019	W rytmie serca	Marta Hoffman	Episode: "Grzechy przeszłości" (no. 62)
2024	Shadow Play	Helena Bielawska	13 episodes
2025	Kibic	Gośka	

=== Polish-language dubbing ===
Year	Title	Role	Notes
2008	Tinker Bell	Tinker Bell	Feature film
2009	Curious George 2: Follow That Monkey!	Girl	Feature film
2009	Tinker Bell and the Lost Treasure	Tinker Bell	Feature film
2010	The Boy Who Cried Werewolf	KC	Feature film
2010	Tinker Bell and the Great Fairy Rescue	Tinker Bell	Feature film
2010	The Troop	Laurel	Television series
2012	The Looney Tunes Show	Carol	Television series; episode: "Devil Dog"
2013	The Sylvester & Tweety Mysteries	Trudy	Television series; episode: "The Maltese Canary"; Boomerang version
2014	The Pirate Fairy	Tinker Bell	Feature film
2015	Disney Infinity 3.0		Video game
2015	Tinker Bell and the Legend of the NeverBeast	Tinker Bell	Feature film
2019–2023	The Mandalorian	Koska Reeves	Television series; 3 episodes
