= Wiktoria Wolańska =

Polish actor (born 1980)

- Born: Wiktoria Wolańska; 31 December 1993 (age 32)
- Education: Aleksander Zelwerowicz National Academy of Dramatic Art
- Occupation: Actress
- Years active: 2015–present
- Children: 1

Wiktoria Gregorek (Polish: [vikˈtɔ.rja ɡrɛˈɡɔ.rɛk]; née Wolańska, Polish: [vɔˈlaɲ.ska]; (Note: She continues to be credited as Wiktoria Wolańska in her acting career.) born 31 January 1993) is a Polish film, television, and voice actress. She also works as a cleaner, and owns the cleaning company Czysto.tu. She starred as Aleksandra Tubilewicz, one of the main characters in the 2019 war melodrama film Legions, and as Karina in the 2021 romantic comedy drama film My Wonderful Life. Gregorek also portrayed recurring characters, such as Ada Poznańska in the soap opera series Na Wspólnej (2018–2019), Ofka in the historical soap opera The Crown of the Kings (2018–2020), Halina Zaręba in the historical war drama series Ludzie i bogowie (2020), and Iwona in the drama series Friends (2021). She also appeared in the television series such as Father Matthew (2016), L for Love (2017), Mecenas Porada (2021), Rodzina na Maxa (2023), and Profilerka. Jastrë (2025). She had numerous voice acting roles in the Polish-language dubbing, including Cruz Ramirez in Cars 3 (2017), Michelle "MJ" Jones-Watson in Spider-Man: Homecoming (2017), Spider-Man: Far From Home (2019), and Spider-Man: No Way Home (2021), Chani in Dune: Part Two (2024), and Varang in Avatar: Fire and Ash (2025).

== Biography ==
Wiktoria Gregorek (née Wolańska) was born on 31 January 1993. In 2017, she graduated from the Faculty of Acting of the Aleksander Zelwerowicz National Academy of Dramatic Art in Warsaw, Poland. From 2016 to 2018, she performed at the National Theatre in Warsaw, Poland.

Gregorek portrayed recurring characters, such as Ada Poznańska in the soap opera series Na Wspólnej (2018–2019), Ofka in the historical soap opera The Crown of the Kings (2018–2020), Halina Zaręba in the historical war drama series Ludzie i bogowie (2020), and Iwona in the drama series Friends (2021). She also appeared in the television series such as Father Matthew (2016), L for Love (2017), Mecenas Porada (2021), Rodzina na Maxa (2023), and Profilerka. Jastrë (2025). She starred as Aleksandra Tubilewicz, one of the main characters in the 2019 war melodrama film Legions. She also portrayed Karina in the 2021 romantic comedy drama film My Wonderful Life, and was a narrator for the 2021 documentary film W odmętach Ravensbrück. Gregorek is also a voice actor. She had numerous roles in the Polish-language dubbing, including Cruz Ramirez in Cars 3 (2017), Michelle "MJ" Jones-Watson in Spider-Man: Homecoming (2017), Spider-Man: Far From Home (2019), and Spider-Man: No Way Home (2021), Chani in Dune: Part Two (2024), and Varang in Avatar: Fire and Ash (2025).

In 2020, during the COVID-19 pandemic, as she could not find acting employment, she began working as a cleaner, and opened her cleaning company Czysto.tu.

== Private life ==
Gregorek is in a relationship with a male partner, with whom she has one child. She lives in Warsaw, Poland, within the neighbourhood of Saska Kępa in the Praga-South district.

== Filmography ==
=== Films ===
Year	Title	Role	Notes
2018	Nastka	Zosia	Short film
2018	Paradiso	Florist	Television play
2019	Legions	Aleksandra Tubilewicz	Feature film
2020	W odmętach Ravensbrück	Narrator	Documentary film; voice
2021	My Wonderful Life	Karina	Feature film
2023	Oddech	Sister	Short film

=== Television series ===
Year	Title	Role	Notes
2016	Father Matthew	Anka Dąbrowska	Episode: "Branzoletka"
2017	L for Love	Julia's friend	2 episodes
2018–2019	Na Wspólnej	Ada Poznańska	Recurring role; 28 episodes
2018–2020	The Crown of the Kings	Ofka	Recurring role; 16 episodes
2020	Ludzie i bogowie	Halina Zaręba	Recurring role; 8 episodes
2021	Friends	Iwona	Recurring role; 7 episodes
2021	Mecenas Porada	Szabnam Nustrat	Episode: "Dzieci bez mamy"
2023	Rodzina na Maxa	Patrycja	3 episodes
2025	Profilerka. Jastrë	Marta Myszk	Episode no. 6

=== Polish-language dubbing ===
Year	Title	Role	Notes
2015	Alvinnn!!! and the Chipmunks	Additional voices	Television series; 9 episodes
2015	BoJack Horseman	Roast attendant	Television series; episode: "Zoës and Zeldas"; original released in 2014
2015	BoJack Horseman	Koala tourist	Television series; episode: "Live Fast, Diane Nguyen"; original released in 2014
2015	BoJack Horseman	Sharona	Television series; episode: "The Telescope"; original released in 2014
2015	BoJack Horseman	Naomi Watts	Television series; episode: "One Trick Pony"; original released in 2014
2015	BoJack Horseman	Woman who slept with BoJack Horseman	Television series; episode: "Later"; original released in 2014
2015	BoJack Horseman	Cardigan Burke	Television series; episode: "Hank After Dark"
2015	BoJack Horseman	Veronica	Television series; episode: "Let's Find Out"
2015	BoJack Horseman	Improviser woman	Television series; 2 episodes
2015	BoJack Horseman	Secretary	Television series; episode: "Sabrina's Christmas Wish"
2015	Miraculous: Tales of Ladybug & Cat Noir	Juleka Couffaine	Television series; episode: "Timebreaker"
2015	Miraculous: Tales of Ladybug & Cat Noir	Nadja Chamack	Television series; episode: "Befana"
2015	Teen Beach 2	Additional voices	Television film
2015–2017	The Adventures of Puss in Boots	Additional voices	Television series
2015–2017	LoliRock	Additional voices	Television series; original released between 2014 and 2017
2015–2019	BoJack Horseman	Vanessa Gekko	Television series; 5 episodes; original released between 2014 and 2019
2016	Atomic Puppet	Additional voices	Television series
2016	BoJack Horseman	Carla Hall	Television series; episode: "That Went Well"
2016	Dying Light: The Following	Ezgi	Video game
2016	Future-Worm!	Additional voices	Television series
2017	BoJack Horseman	Worker ant	Television series; episode: "Underground"
2017	BoJack Horseman	Passerby	Television series; episode: "Underground"
2017	BoJack Horseman	Jennifer Picarelli	Television series; episode: "lovin that cali lifestyle!!"
2017	Cars 3	Cruz Ramirez	Feature film
2017	Cloudy with a Chance of Meatballs	Additional voices	Television series;
2017	The Lodge	Additional voices	Television series; original released between 2016 and 2017
2017	Mighty Magiswords	Magisword	Television series; episode: "Letter Wronging Campaign"
2017	Mighty Magiswords	Dolphin	Television series; episodes: "The Saga of Robopiggeh!"
2017	Mighty Magiswords	Little monster #2	Television series; episodes: "The Saga of Robopiggeh!"
2017	Miss Fritter's Racing Skoool	Cruz Ramirez	Short film
2017	Pirates of the Caribbean: Dead Men Tell No Tales	Shansa	Feature film
2017	Rick and Morty	Tammy Gueterman	Television series; episode: "Ricksy Business"; ordinal released in 2014; second dubbing version
2017	Rick and Morty	Nurse	Television series; episode: "Interdimensional Cable 2: Tempting Fate"; ordinal released in 2015; second dubbing version
2017	Rick and Morty	Arthricia	Television series; episode: "Look Who's Purging Now"; ordinal released in 2015; second dubbing version
2017	Spider-Man: Homecoming	Michelle "MJ" Jones-Watson	Feature film
2017	Thor: Ragnarok	Additional voices	Feature film
2017–2020	Marvel's Spider-Man	Additional voices	Television series
2018	Penny on M.A.R.S.	Lucy's mother	Television series; episode: "Parent's Open Day"
2018	Penny on M.A.R.S.	Secretary	Television series; 5 episodes
2019	Days Gone	Additional voices	Video game
2019	Descendants 3	Additional voices	Television film
2019	Kim Possible	Shego	Feature film
2019	My Little Pony: Friendship Is Magic	Auntie Lofty	Television series; episode: "The Last Crusade"
2019	No Good Nick	Lisa	Television series; 4 episodes
2019	Penny on M.A.R.S.	Nurse	Television series; episode: "A New Friend"
2019	Spider-Man: Far From Home	Michelle "MJ" Jones-Watson	Feature film
2019	The Witcher	Anica	Television series; episode: "Four Marks"
2020	Cyberpunk 2077	Susie Q	Video game
2020	Marvel's Avengers	Additional voices	Video games
2021	A Call to Spy	Noor Inayat Khan	Feature film; original released in 2019
2021	In Ned's Head	Helen	Feature film; original released in 2020
2021	Spider-Man: No Way Home	Michelle "MJ" Jones-Watson	Feature film
2021	Waffles + Mochi	Katie	Television series; episode: "Tomato"
2022	Cars on the Road	Cruz Ramirez	Television series; episode: "Gettin' Hitched"
2022	Lightyear	Additional voices	Feature film
2022	Museum	Additional voices	Documentary film
2023	Diablo IV		Video game
2023	Hero Inside	Additional voices	Television series
2024	Dune: Part Two	Chani	Feature film
2024	Inside Out 2	Ennui	Feature film
2024	Twilight of the Gods	Sigrid	Television series
2025	Avatar: Fire and Ash	Varang	Feature film
Unknown	Avengers Assemble	Additional voices	Television series; released between 2013 and 2018
