= Krystyna Feldman =

Polish actress (1916–2007)

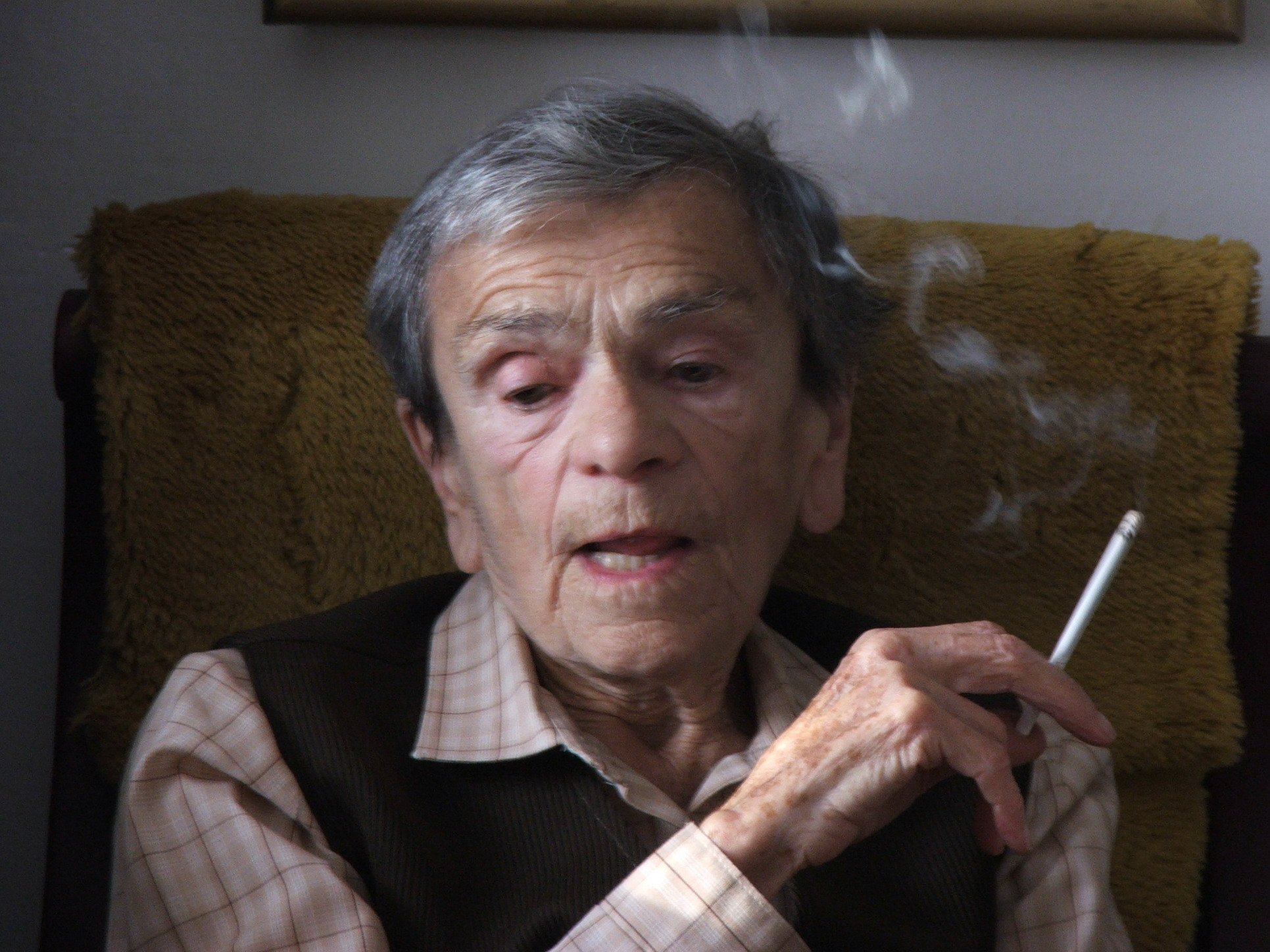
- Krystyna Feldman, during her visit to Inowrocław
- Born: 1 March 1916; Lemberg, Austria-Hungary
- Died: 24 January 2007 (aged 90); Poznań, Poland
- Occupation: Actress

Krystyna Zofia Feldman (1 March 1916 – 24 January 2007) was a Polish actress.

== Life and career ==
Born in Lemberg, Austria-Hungary (now Lviv, Ukraine) to a Catholic mother, Katarzyna Sawicka, an opera singer and a Jewish father, Ferdynand Feldman, an actor. Her father died in 1919 when she was 3 years old. At that time, Lemberg (Lwów) returned to the reborn Poland and her mother began to educate Krystyna at the Lwów acting studio run by the actor Janusz Strachocki. In 1934, she graduated from the gymnasium named Queen Jadwiga in Lwów; She passed her secondary school-leaving examination extramural in order to pass the exams to the theater school. After three years of study, in 1937, she graduated from the State Institute of Theater Arts in Warsaw. Soon after, she made her debut at the Grand Theatre in Lwów. In 1939, she was engaged to the theater in Łuck in Poland (now Lutsk, Ukraine), but after the outbreak of World War II, she returned to Lwów, which was under Soviet occupation from October 6, 1939 (read: Soviet invasion of Poland). In 1942 she was sworn in as a soldier of the Home Army. She was a liaison there. She returned to the stage of the Lwów theater in 1944 after the Red Army entered the city. At that time, she played the male role of Staszek (book character) in Wyspiański's Wesele (The Wedding - the book from 1901), directed by Aleksander Bardini. After the separation of Lwów from Poland in 1945 and the incorporation of the city into the USSR, Feldman moved to the new borders of Poland - she settled in Poznań. She starred in theatre productions there until 1944, and later in Łódź, Szczecin, Opole, and Kraków. In 1980, the Security Service initiated an operational reconnaissance case against the actress, codenamed "Aranżerka" (the feminine version of the word arranger, Polish: aranżer). Krystyna Feldman was harassed after she signed a letter defending the autonomy of the Adam Mickiewicz University in Poznań. Despite the control of correspondence, frequent searches in the apartment and many difficulties in the development of her career, the actress couldn't be broken. Since 1983, she performed at the Teatr Nowy in Poznań.

Feldman made her film debut in Celuloza (1953), directed by Jerzy Kawalerowicz. Her career continued with various supporting roles. She was best known for a male role of an elderly disabled painter Nikifor in Mój Nikifor (My Nikifor), for which she won the award for best actress in 2004 at the Polish Film Festival in Gdynia and numerous awards at other festivals in the world:

1. Best Actress at 4th International Film Festival - Pune 2006
2. Best European Film at 8th Denver International Film Festival 2005
3. Best Actress at 50th Valladolid International Film Festival 2005
4. Best Film at The 41st Chicago International Film Festival 2005
5. Best Film at The 18th Panorama Of European Cinema - Athens 2005
6. Best Actor/Actress at International Film Festival - Manila 2005
7. Best Actress at International Actor's Film Festival in Kyiv - Stozhary 2005
8. Grand Prix, Best Actress and Best Film at 40th International Film Festival Karlovy Vary 2005

She also appeared as the grandmother in the TV sitcom Świat według Kiepskich. This role brought her great fame and popularity.

Krystyna Feldman died of lung cancer in her flat in Poznań, aged 90. She was a long-term heavy smoker.
