= The Christening =

- Film poster
- Polish: Chrzest
- Directed by: Marcin Wrona
- Starring: Wojciech Zieliński; Tomasz Schuchardt
- Release date: 26 May 2010 (PFF)
- Running time: 86 minutes
- Country: Poland
- Language: Polish

The Christening (Polish: Chrzest) is a 2010 Polish drama film directed by Marcin Wrona.

== Plot ==
The action takes place over seven days. The main character, Michał, is a gangster. One day, he is caught by the police. In exchange for turning in his boss, he manages to avoid prison. He then cuts himself off from the criminal world and starts a family. He also intends to baptize his son. The situation becomes complicated when Michał is visited by his former colleague, Janek. Michał offers him the role of godfather. At the same time, Michał is haunted by the brother of the man he betrayed, the gangster boss Gruby.

== Cast ==
- Wojciech Zieliński as Michal Leba
- Tomasz Schuchardt as Janek
- Natalia Rybicka as Magda
- Adam Woronowicz as Gruby
- Michał Koterski as Lysy
- Krzysztof Czeczot as Dres
- Paweł Tomaszewski as Wyzelowany
- Aleksandra Radwańska as Agata
- Anita Poddębniak as Leśniakowa
- Drew Roden as himself
