= The Lousy World =

Polish sitcom (1999 - 2022)

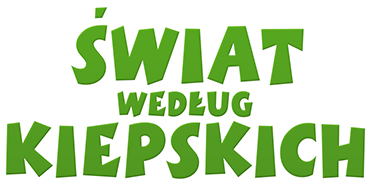
- Genre: Sitcom
- Created by: Janusz Sadza; Aleksander Sobiszewski; Piotr Kalwas
- Written by: Present: Aleksander Sobiszewski; Katarzyna Sobiszewska; Patrick Yoka
- Directed by: Okił Khamidow (1999–2008); Patrick Yoka (2008–2017); Adek Drabiński (2018-2021)
- Starring: Andrzej Grabowski; Marzena Kipiel-Sztuka; Krystyna Feldman; Bartosz Żukowski; Barbara Mularczyk; Ryszard Kotys; Renata Pałys; Dariusz Gnatowski; Bohdan Smoleń
- Opening theme: "Świat według Kiepskich" by Big Cyc
- Country of origin: Poland
- Original language: Polish
- No. of seasons: 35
- No. of episodes: 589 + 1 special

Production
- Executive producer: Anna Skowrońska
- Running time: ca. 20-35 minutes
- Production company: ATM Grupa

Original release
- Network: Polsat
- Release: 16 March 1999 – 16 November 2022

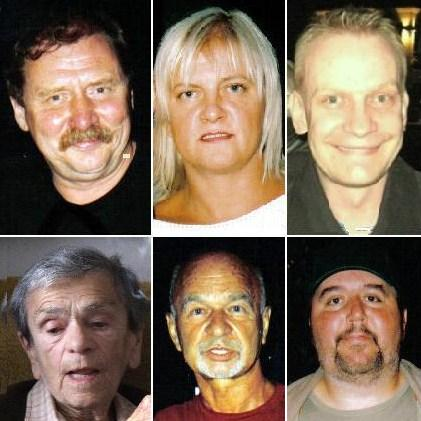
The Kiepskis and their neighbours. From left to right: Ferdynand, Halina, Waldemar and Rozalia Kiepskis, following with Marian Paździoch and Arnold Boczek.

The Lousy World (Note: Polish: Świat według Kiepskich, literally meaning: The World According to the Kiepskis (Lousys), with surname Kiepski, roughly translating to the English term lousy) is a Polish television sitcom that premiered on 16 March 1999 on Polsat. The show follows the life of a dysfunctional Polish family from Wrocław. Most episodes are centered on Ferdynand Kiepski, the family's patriarch, who schemes to improve his financial or life situation, but in most cases ultimately fails. The series is a parody of stereotypical lives of Polish families in a style similar to the American series Married... with Children.

In June 2022, Polsat announced the end of production of the show.

== Main characters ==
=== The Kiepski family ===
- Ferdynand Kiepski (Andrzej Grabowski), also called "Ferdek": Head of the family, almost continuously unemployed (since 23 April 1980) father of two, who has a penchant for canned beer and trying to prove that he is an unappreciated genius. His character is similar to that of Homer Simpson, as well as Peggy Bundy, who enjoys the finer things in life yet refuses to work for them. Ferdynand comes up with ridiculous get-rich-quick schemes that, due to his own faults and comic coincidences, usually fail (when they succeed they are usually a part of a spin-off episode, which is never referenced again). Addicted to alcohol and cigarettes. His favorite pastimes are drinking "Mocny Full" ("Strong Full") beer and watching television. He inherited his name after his German grandfather, Ferdinand Urlich Doppeldeke. Childish and optimistic, but often showing common sense. Despite his greedy, short-sighted and lazy antics, Ferdynand displays compassion and genuine care for his family and even neighbours. Ferdynand is shown in later seasons as a hypocritical zealous Roman Catholic, eager to act as a respectable patriarch of his family and to criticize any sins committed by others, but blind to his own alcoholism, laziness, xenophobia, and toxic personality. He failed to finish elementary school. When his wife asks him about employment, he always makes his signature excuse "W tym kraju nie ma pracy dla ludzi z moim wykształceniem." ("There are no jobs in this country for people with my education"). He made his debut in the first episode.
- Halina Kiepska (Marzena Kipiel-Sztuka): Ferdek's wife, who works at a nearby hospital as a nurse. In early episodes she was a cleaning lady at a hospital, but one day Ferdek had his wish granted through a miracle, and his wife got a better job. Every day she has to solve problems created by other members of the family. Addicted to cigarettes. She's the one strong-arming Ferdynand to look for a job, usually using a line "A w pośredniaku byłeś?" ("Did you go to the job centre today?"). In a self-contained episode #151 she turned out to be intersex. She also debuted in the first episode.
- Waldemar Kiepski (nicknamed "Cyc" - "Tit") (Bartosz Żukowski), also called Walduś: the adult son of Ferdynand and Halina. Like his father he is unemployed. In the early episodes his life revolved around bodybuilding or drinking beer with his father, as well as avoiding books and studying. Walduś had problems with finishing elementary school, but after many attempts he succeeded. He often helps his father with his schemes, although he often questions them and is the voice of reason. Walduś ends up leaving for the United States to sell hot dogs with his uncle Staszek in Texas, but he comes back in the 17th season and gets married with Jolanta Kopeć. After the marriage, his character is changed to a spineless man with anger issues, dominated by his wife. Although he is treated by Jolanta as little more than a machine for making money, he genuinely loves his wife, much to the dismay of Ferdynand. He debuted in the first episode.
- Mariola Kiepska (Barbara Mularczyk): Waldek’s younger sister. In the first several seasons she is an average teenager and likes to spend time outside the house - this usually involves going somewhere with her boyfriend Łysy ('Bald'). In the most recent seasons she is in her late twenties. Her personality throughout seasons: from a talkative, party-loving teenager looking for a big love she becomes a fairly smart, independent young woman - she states that she doesn't need marriage - arguing that she has a lot of divorced people among her friends. She has been under her parents' pressure to get married, for a long time with no success. She finally agrees get married, being persuaded by her sister-in-law that a woman who has never married sounds as if she was not considered attractive enough, and feeling that being called a divorcée will sound better than being an old maiden. Ultimately she remains single. As the youngest of the family, Mariola often criticizes Ferdynand, believing that he does not understand modernity. However, in difficult situations, she is happy to support her father and the rest of her family. She debuted in the first episode - Umarł odbiornik, niech żyje odbiornik! (TV is dead, long live the TV!)
- Rozalia Małolepsza (commonly known as "Babka" - "Gran") (Krystyna Feldman): Ferdynand’s mother-in-law, despite her last name being Małolepsza ('Not-much-better'); she is often referred to as Rozalia Kiepska. She was a religious senile pensioner using a wheelchair, although she could walk on two legs with great difficulty. Her pension was a key component of the family’s budget. Ferdynand constantly tried to con her out of money in order to buy more beer for himself. She was cunning and malicious, but compared to the other characters in the series, she showed some common sense. She often used false Bible quotes to spite Ferdek. She loved Dziwne przygody Koziołka Matołka, a Polish cartoon from the 1960s, and also the religious radio station Radio Maryja. One time, along with her friends, she became a member of a street gang, robbing sweets stores and knitting scarves. Feldman resigned from this role two years before her death in 2007, after which Rozalia has been established as dead. Rozalia debuted in the first episode.
- Jolanta Kiepska (nicknamed "Jolasia" and "Pupcia") (Anna Ilczuk): Waldemar's wife. A narcissist and the dominant person in the marriage, she is cunning, opportunistic and extremely ruthless, demeaning her husband whenever possible, using emotional manipulation on her mother-in-law Halina, and stealing somewhat valuable items and food from the home of her parents-in-law whenever she can. She frequently talks in verse and fashions extravagant hairstyles and vibrant hair colors.She doesn't love her husband, she's with him only for his money. She loves sex but she says her husband is bad on that case.
- Mikołaj Kopernik (Andrzej Kłak): the first fiancé of Mariola, a timid, well-read and eccentric young man who used to be Mariola's silent admirer, with no response from Mariola herself until the marriage arranged by her parents. Ultimately, she gave up and did not show up at the wedding altar, and he had a nervous breakdown. He makes his first appearance in the 517th episode.
- Oskar Sowa-Strzygoń (Sebastian Stankiewicz): the second fiancé of Mariola, an inventor working for the state. He fell in love with Mariola on the spot, and she fell in love with him in return. After proposing to her, they decided to live together in a vacant apartment next to the Paździochs' apartment. But after Mariola refused to live with his mother, who moved in with them, he threw Mariola out of their apartment. In doing so, they broke off their engagement and all relations between them.
- Zofia Sowa-Strzygoń (Hanna Śleszyńska): Oskar's mother. Calm and nice to others, although she treats Mariola with reserve. Because of her, Oskar broke off his engagement with Mariola.

=== Others ===
- Marian Paździoch (Ryszard Kotys): a neighbour of the Kiepski family who owns several unsuccessful businesses. His day job is selling lingerie at a bazaar. He is a constant rival and frenemy to Ferdynand and both are often thorns in each other's sides. He is usually called 'menda' (cunt). Many of the stories of his past are contradictory. In one episode he stated his father is German and in another, that his mother wanted him to be a priest (he keeps lying to his mother and saying that he is one). Marian's full name is Marian Janusz Heinrich Gottlieb Paździoch von Biberstein. It has been repeatedly said that he was working with intelligence agencies during the communist regime. Also, Paździoch once hinted that he had been a member of the ZOMO unit, saying that he had been using a baton on the streets of Wroclaw. In episode #363 - Uczeń czarnoksiężnika (The Sorcerer's Apprentice) he turns out to be an ancient evil sorcerer, soon defeated by Ferdek and Walduś and turned into a toilet roll, which was never referenced again. He died in several episodes, in one he has become a Christian missionary to christianise an alien race, all of which also haven't been referenced again. In several non-connected episodes he turns out to be a trans woman or a gay man. He debuted in the first episode.
- Arnold Boczek (Arnold Bacon) (Dariusz Gnatowski): another neighbour and Ferdek's frenemy, an employee of a slaughterhouse; he is obese and not very clever. Second frenemy of Ferdynand. The past of Arnold Boczek is contradictory; while in most episodes it is stated that he originates from a village near Elbląg, in one episode he is presented as a transgender man born in Italy. He enjoys eating fatty meat accompanied with vodka. He is very naive and often becomes a victim of Paździoch's business plans. He's a keen lover of Mongolian ballet. In the first two episodes Boczek appeared to live with his brother, who has never been seen or mentioned again, however other relatives of Boczek appeared during the show. Also, in the first two episodes he appeared in, Boczek was portrayed as aggressive and tough but in later episodes he became a very sympathetic and childish person. One of the frequent gags in the show consists of Boczek using the public toilet on the floor of Kiepskis and Paździochs, much to their irritation. In one episode it is shown that He never existed and were only a figment of imagination of Kiepscy, Paździochowie and other neighbors. He debuted in the second episode - Wiara czyni cuda (Faith performs miracles).
- Helena Paździoch née Meisner (Renata Pałys): Marian's wife. She is greedy, despotic, ruthless and very violent. She doesn't love her husband. She debuted in first episode - Umarł odbiornik, niech żyje odbiornik! (TV is dead, long live the TV!)
- Edzio Listonosz (Eddie Mailman) (Bohdan Smoleń): a cynic and witty mailman delivers mail to the Kiepski’s home. Always speaks in verse, and describes himself as a 'poet' and a philosopher. Sometimes he plays pranks on the residents for his own amusement. He also enjoys it when the residents get irritated by the high bills he brings. He is sometimes called "Edzio-Pedzio", by Ferdynand (Pedzio is an abbreviation of the Polish slur "pedał", which translates to faggot). He was debuted in first episode, but was written as a cameo role due to the actor's failing health, and ultimately written off due to Smoleń's death in 2016.
- Prezes Andrzej Kozłowski (Andrzej Gałła): a corrupt politician in charge of the Kiepski's neighborhood. Considers himself a friend of Ferdek, even though the people of the neighborhood generally dislike him for his incompetence and for showing off his considerable wealth. He has a wife nicknamed Foka (Seal), played by Joanna Kurowska, and a political arch-nemesis Talarek, played by Krzysztof Dracz.
- Malinowska (Zofia Czerwińska): the owner of the local shop U Stasia named after her now deceased husband Stanisław (also Krzysztof Dracz). An assertive woman, aware of the large debt that Ferdynand and Badura own her due to never having any money. After Czerwińska's death in 2019, Malinowska has been established as dead.
- Badura (Lech Dyblik): a homeless alcoholic living in a scrap-heap. A friend of Ferdynand (though the latter often insults him while Badura isn't present), a scrap hunter, a philosopher and a guitarist with an addiction to cheap wine. In one self-contained episode he was revealed to be an angel.
- Tadeusz Kopciński (Jerzy Cnota): a lonely retired man in his seventies, a nosey and assertive man, posing as a pious and devout Catholic despite the fact that during the rule of socialists he used to be an ardent follower of the Communist Party.
- Janusz Marian Paździoch da Silva Bolsonaro Haczapui (Sławomir Szczęśniak): the illegitimate adult son of Marian Paździoch and of Roma woman Esmeralda Dolores da Silva Bolsonaro Haczapui. He is 50 Years old. He lived in Paraguay until his arrival to Poland, where he reunited with his father. Initially rejected by Helena Paździoch, he is accepted by her as a son when he proves that he is very wealthy. He lives with Marian and Helena in their apartment. He first appeared in the 541st episode.
- Ziemowit Kiepski (Maciej Gołębiowski), also called "Ziomek": a cousin from the countryside, son of Ferdek's brother Staszek. He was living with the Kiepskis for a while, fulfilling the role of Waldemar when the actor who played as Waldemar had a break from the series.
- Wujek Władek (Uncle Władek): Ferdek's uncle from the countryside, played by different actors, mostly by Marek Pyś, but also by Roman Kłosowski. He is canonically dead, Ferdynand once used a licensed herbalist's help to visit Władek in the afterlife.
- Borysek (Kazimierz Ostrowicz): an old man who lives in the Kiepski's block of flats, who used to be a baker before retirement. He is a strict Catholic while also being a sexaholic. He debuted in the second episode. An abandoned character after Ostrowicz's dead, after which Borysek has been established as dead.
- Paulinka (Zuzanna Helska): an old unpleasant woman that lives in the Kiepski's block of flats. Babka's friend, a very strict Catholic. She also debuted in the second episode. A discontinued character.
- Stanisław Pączek (Michał Grudziński): local Catholic priest with a very harsh and judgemental personality. He dislikes Ferdek, Marian and Arnold for their sinful lives.

== Reception ==
Neatorama's Miss Cellania critiqued the show saying "You can tell by the picture that this production strayed a bit from the original formula instead of trying to clone the American sitcom."

== See also ==
- Married... with Children
- The Royle Family
