= Marzena Kipiel-Sztuka =

Polish actress (1965–2024)

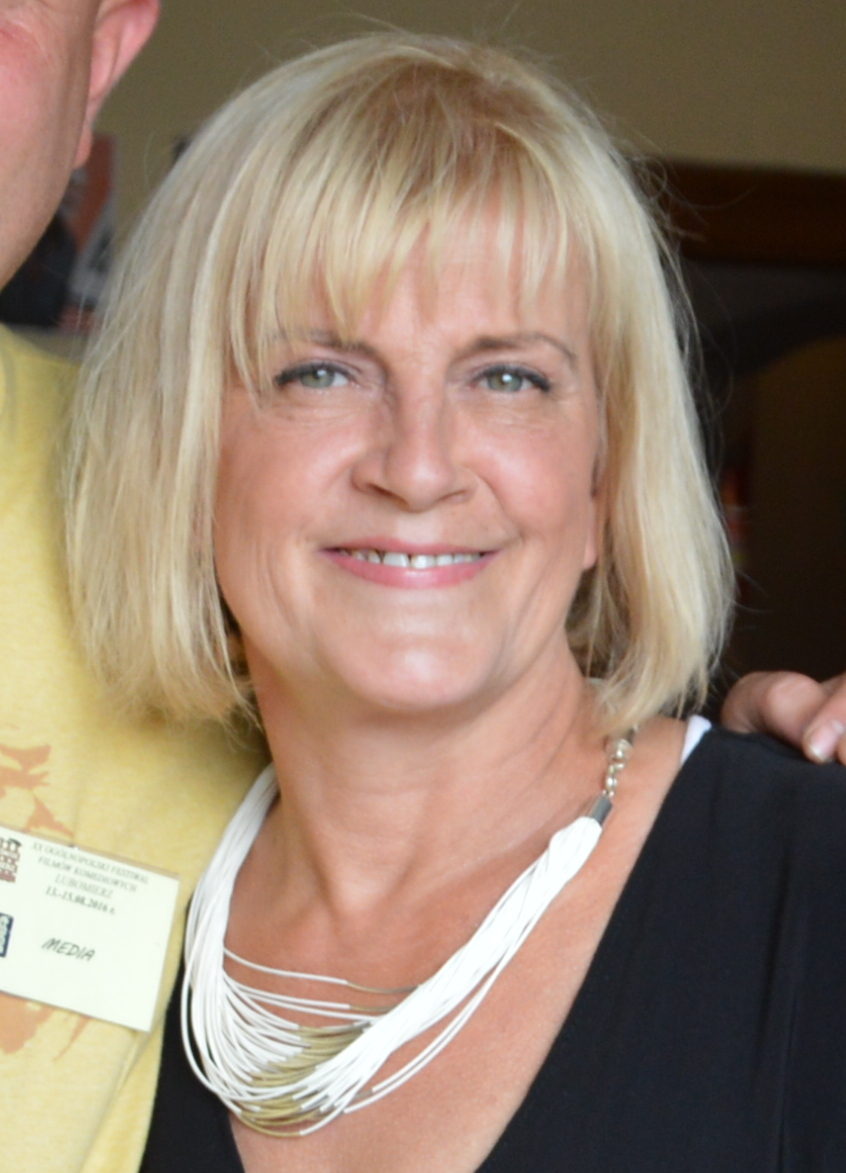
- Kipiel-Sztuka in 2016
- Born: Marzena Kipiel; 19 October 1965; Legnica, Poland
- Died: 9 June 2024 (aged 58); Wałbrzych, Poland
- Occupation: Actress
- Years active: 1989–2024

Marzena Kipiel-Sztuka (Polish: [maˈʐɛ.na ˈki.pjɛl ˈʂtu.ka]; 19 October 1965 – 9 June 2024) was a Polish stage and television actress. She was best known for her role as Halina Kiepska, one of the main characters in the sitcom television series The Lousy World (1999–2022).

== Biography ==
Marzena Kipiel-Sztuka was born on 19 October 1965 in Legnica, Poland. She graduated from the Construction Vocational School in Legnica. From 1987 to 1989, she worked as a prompter in the Aleksander Fredro Theatre in Gniezno, and from 1989 to 2000 she was an actress in the Helena Modrzejewska Theatre in Legnica. In 1991, she passed an extramural exam, and in 1993, she received the Złota Iglica award for acting. In the 1990s, she also briefly worked as a singer in Oman for a half of a year, and as a maid in Munich, Germany.

In 1997, she had a minor role in the Belgian–Dutch film Character. From 1999 to 2022, she portrayed Halina Kiepska, one of the main characters in the Polish sitcom television series The Lousy World. She became recognisable nationwide, and it remains her most famous role. She also had small roles in television series Crime Wave (2004, 2006), and First Love (2004), as well as in feature films Tricks (2007), Byzuch 2: Rewizyta (2010), and Kop głębiej (2012).

In 2007, she participated in the Polsat talent show Jak oni śpiewają. In 2014, she received Kryształowy Granat award for the best comedy performance at the 18th All-Poland Comedy Film Festival in Lubomierz.

Kipiel-Sztuka had small roles in the feature films Fighter (2019), 1:11 (2021), and Love is Nearby (2022), and in the television series Sprawiedliwi – Wydział Kryminalny (2019), and The Behaviorist (2022). In 2023 she appeared in the music film video of the song "Maradona" by SMKKPM.

Kipiel-Sztuka toured with her music show titled Życie nie jest kiepskie (Life is not so lousy). She was also a long-time supporter of the charity events of the Independent Self-Governing Trade Union of the Police Officers. In 2019, for her efforts, she was awarded the first-class Cross of Independence with Star.

=== Personal life and death ===
Her first husband was film director and producer Konrad Sztuka. They divorced, and he died in 2015. She later was in a relationship with Mariusz Piesiewicz, member of the film crew on The Lousy World, until his sudden death in 2005. She married her second husband, Przemysław Buksakowski in 2007, and was with him until his death in 2009. She did not have any children.

Kipiel-Sztuka suffered from chronic obstructive pulmonary disease and major depressive disorder. She died on 9 June 2024, at the age of 58.

== Filmography ==
=== Feature films ===
| Year | Title | Role | Notes |
|---|---|---|---|
| 1997 | Character | | |
| 2007 | Tricks | Viola's mother | |
| 2010 | Byzuch 2: Rewizyta | Marzena | |
| 2012 | Kop głębiej | Daria Nowak | |
| 2016 | Jak uratować mamę | Witch | Voice only |
| 2019 | Fighter | Nurse | |
| 2021 | 1:11 | Janina | |
| 2022 | Love is Nearby | Grażyna Kulikowska | |

=== Television series ===
| Year | Title | Role | Notes |
|---|---|---|---|
| 1999–2022 | The Lousy World | Halina Kiepska | Main role |
| 2004 | Crime Wave | Restaurant owner | Episode: "Decyzja" (no. 8) |
| 2006 | Crime Wave | Danczewska | Episode: "Krwawa szkoła" (no. 52) |
| 2004 | First Love | Nurse Jola | Episode no. 52 |
| 2007 | Jak oni śpiewają | Herself (contestant) | Talent show |
| 2012 | Galeria | Housekeeper | |
| 2019 | Sprawiedliwi – Wydział Kryminalny | Genowefa Kopczyk | |
| 2021 | Kabaret na żywo | Krystyna Pawłowicz | 1 episode |
| 2022 | The Behaviorist | Horst's aunt | 2 episodes |

== Awards and decorations ==
- Cross of Independence with Star, first-class (2019)
