= Time of Darkness =

2008 Polish film by Grzegorz Kuczeriszka

- Polish theatrical release poster
- Polish: Pora mroku
- Directed by: Grzegorz Kuczeriszka
- Written by: Mahamudul Islam Riad; Dominik W. Rettinger
- Produced by: Włodzimierz Otulak
- Starring: Natalia Rybicka; Paweł Tomaszewski; Karolina Gorczyca; Jakub Wesołowski; Jan Wieczorkowski; Katarzyna Maciąg; Jakub Strzelecki
- Cinematography: Grzegorz Kuczeriszka
- Music by: Adam Burzyński
- Release date: 2008
- Running time: 95 minutes
- Country: Poland
- Language: Polish

Time of Darkness (Polish: Pora mroku) is a 2008 Polish horror film directed by Grzegorz Kuczeriszka.

== Premise ==
Four friends go to an abandoned factory in Lower Silesia where their friend disappeared a year prior.

== Cast ==
- Natalia Rybicka as Karolina
- Paweł Tomaszewski as Zolo
- Karolina Gorczyca as Joanna Kurczewska
- Jakub Wesołowski as Michał
- Jan Wieczorkowski as Adam
- Katarzyna Maciąg as Majka
- Jakub Strzelecki as Rafał "Raffi" Zarzycki
- Ryszard Ronczewski as Von Kirchof
- Stanisława Łopuszańska as Gertruda
- Ewa Kolasińska as Dr. Heller
- Kamil Kulda as Rambo
- Marcin Juchniewicz as Budruk
- Bartosz Żukowski as Thorn
- Romuald Kłos as Heni
- Michał Kowalski as the male nurse
- Cezary Kussyk as Horst
- Marcin Artecki as Krutas
- Andrzej Gałła as the commander
- Adam Szczyszczaj as Paul
- Piotr Różański as the rental owner
- Barbara Babilińska as the nurse
- Danuta Borsuk as the patient

== Production ==
The film was shot in Osówka and Zagórze Śląskie in the Lower Silesian Voivodeship.
