= Bartosz Żukowski =

Polish actor

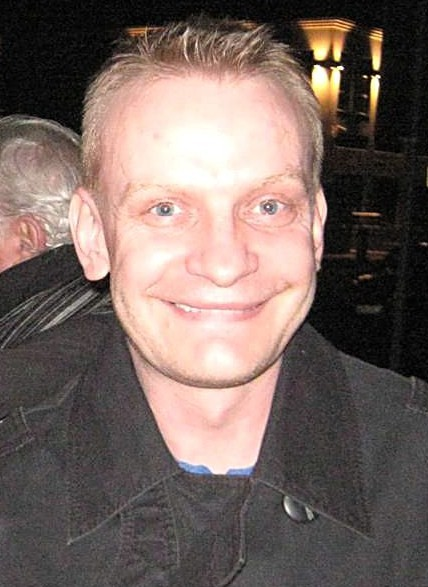

Bartosz Żukowski (born June 9, 1975, in Warsaw, Poland) is a Polish actor. He gained recognition as the actor playing the role of Waldek Kiepski in the Polsat Świat TV series Świat według Kiepskich.

== Biography ==
He lived in Miastkow Kościelny in Garwolin County. He is a graduate of the Theater Studio at the Ochota Theater in Warsaw. He studied at the PWST in Warsaw, but did not complete his studies. He also studied law at the European School of Law and Administration in Warsaw.

He was in a relationship with the star of the Ranczo series, Violetta Arlak. Then he married with Ewa Coll, with whom he is in the process of divorce. They have a daughter Pola (born December 20, 2009).

== Filmography ==
- 1992: Pierścionek z orłem w koronie – Kosior's subordinate
- 1993: Samowolka – waiter Grzelak
- 1993: This Way for the Gas, Ladies and Gentlemen (Polish: Pożegnanie z Marią) – soldier
- 1993: Palec boży (television show) – salesman
- 1993: Dwa księżyce – son of Ludwis
- 1994: Reverted (Polish: Zawrócony) – boy
- 1994: Molly – Igor, Dominik's partner
- 1995: Tato – director's assistant
- 1995: Ekscelencja (television show) – Fałalej
- 1995: At Full Gallop (Polish: Cwał) – laborer at the academy
- 1996: Szamanka – AGH student
- 1996: Nocne graffiti – soldier
- 1996: Dom (television show) – student, Marek's friend
- 1997: Wniebowstąpienie (television show) – young guy
- 1998: Brand (television show) – Einar
- 1999–2005, 2011: Świat według Kiepskich – Waldemar „Walduś / Cyc” Kiepski, Waldemar VI Kiepski, Waldemar Małolepszy
- 1999: Pierwszy milion – Witold Hoffman
- 1999: Krugerandy – Mucha
- 2001: Szkoła obmowy (television show) – Józef
- 2002: Gorący temat – Madman, Bończyk's fellow prisoner
- 2003: Warszawa – Rysio, Misia's friend
- 2003: Ubu Król – Józek
- 2004: Książę nocy (television show) – Zbyszek Młotek
- 2004: Atrakcyjny pozna panią... – mayor Wojtuś
- 2005: Lawstorant – prisoner
- 2005: Kryminalni – Dobi Bogucki
- 2006: Just Love Me (Polish: Tylko mnie kochaj) – constable
- 2006: Summer love – blond
- 2006: Jasne błękitne okna – Kamil
- 2006: Faceci do wzięcia – Mariusz Lipko, director of an advertising agency
- 2006: Egzamin z życia – Żelowy, partner of Luiza Żerwe
- 2006: Czeka na nas świat – Sproket, Piotr's friend
- 2007: Tylko miłość – gangster Mariusz "Korba"
- 2008: WW. II behind closed doors. Stalin, the nazis and the west – KGB officer
- 2008: Skorumpowani – chemist Cygara
- 2008: Pora mroku – Thorn
- 2008: Niezawodny system – Mietek, assistant to the bailiff
- 2009: Hel (film 2009) – Mały
- 2009: The Dark House (Polish: Dom zły) – Hawryluk
- 2010: Ojciec Mateusz – soldier of Łuczak
- 2010: Nowa – Radosław Jawor
- 2011: Komisarz Alex – Mrówka
- 2011: Pierwsza miłość (television show) – jeweler Olaf Łęcki
- 2012: Obława – Waniek
- 2012: Hotel 52 – Jurek
- 2013: Świat Walerego – Olek
- 2013: Traffic Department (Polish: Drogówka) – Wójcik
- 2014: Ojciec Mateusz – Jaro
- 2015: These Daughters of Mine (Polish: Moje córki krowy) – healer
- 2015: Komisarz Alex – Nowak
- 2016: Koronka – merchant
- 2017: Serce nie sługa – lawyer
- 2018: Zabawa zabawa – uncle of Magda
- 2018: Trzecia połowa – player of the opposing team
- 2018: Ojciec Mateusz – Andrzej Kowal
- 2018: Jak pokonać kaca – Łukasz
- 2018: Audsajder – prisoner
- 2019: Komisarz Alex – Edek Stefczak
- 2020: Raz, jeszcze raz – Mikser
