= Jutro idziemy do kina =

2007 television film directed by Michał Kwieciński

- Written by: Jerzy Stefan Stawiński
- Directed by: Michał Kwieciński
- Starring: Mateusz Damięcki, Antoni Pawlicki, Kuba Wesołowski
- Theme music composer: Michał Hairluin
- Country of origin: Poland
- Original language: Polish

Production
- Producer: Akson Studio
- Cinematography: Piotr Wojtowicz
- Running time: 85 minutes

Original release
- Release: September 1, 2007

Jutro idziemy do kina (English: Tomorrow we are going to the movies) is a 2007 Polish television movie, directed by Michał Kwieciński. It tells a story of three high school graduates whose lives are changed by World War II (see: Polish September Campaign).

It won Gold Magnolia Award for Best Television Film at the 14th Shanghai Television Festival in China.

== Synopsis ==
Jutro idziemy do kina follows three friends who graduate from high school in May 1938. Two of them join the army, and the third becomes a student of medicine. After graduation, they frequently meet each other, and in the summer of 1939, when war becomes imminent, they try not to keep themselves too occupied with it. However, the outbreak of World War II changes their world forever.

== Cast ==
  - Mateusz Damięcki – Andrzej Skowroński
  - Antoni Pawlicki – Piotr Dołowy
  - Jakub Wesołowski – Jerzy Bolesławski
  - Grażyna Szapołowska
  - Olgierd Łukaszewicz
  - Sylwia Oksiuta-Warmus
  - Anna Gzyra
  - Julia Pietrucha
  - Maria Niklińska – Basia
  - Marta Ścisłowicz – Ania
  - Krzysztof Banaszyk
  - Krzysztof Stelmaszyk
  - Katarzyna Gniewkowska
  - Jacek Romanowski
  - Krzysztof Skonieczny – Bzowski
  - Adam Krawczyk – Zawada
  - Piotr Żurawski – Natan Cymertopf
  - Andrzej Szenajch – Generał
  - Daniel Olbrychski
  - Grzegorz Łaguna
  - Sebastian Cybulski
  - Monika Jakowczuk
  - Magdalena Lamparska – Małgosia
  - Karol Stępkowski
  - Zofia Tomaszewska-Charewicz – Rózia
  - Jerzy Słonka
  - Michał Rolnicki
  - Bożena Adamek
