= Jakub Wesołowski =

Polish actor

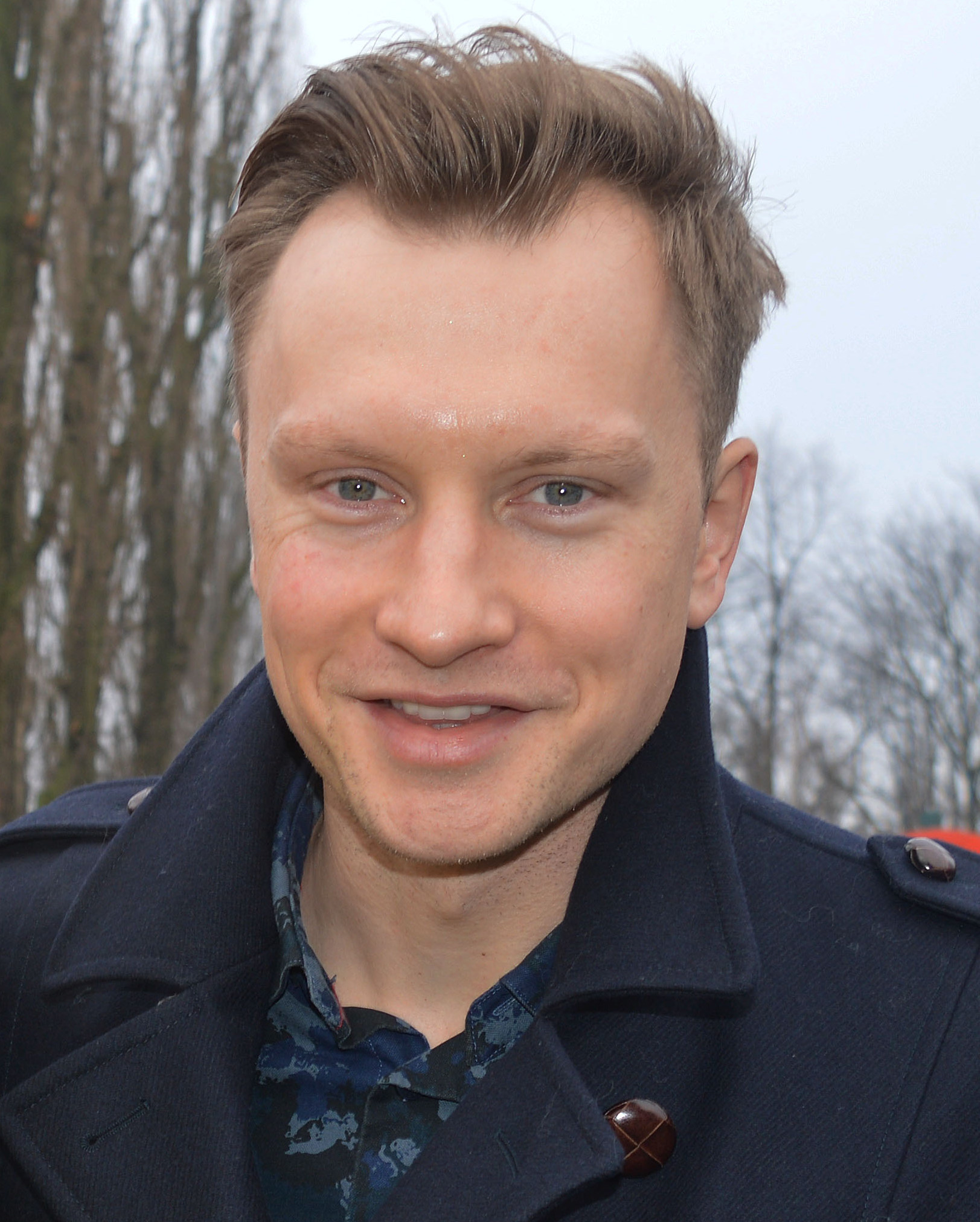
- Jakub Wesołowski in 2018
- Born: 7 May 1985 (age 41); Warsaw, Poland
- Education: Collegium Civitas
- Occupation: Actor
- Years active: 2003–present

Jakub Wesołowski, also known as Kuba Wesołowski, (born 7 May 1985, in Warsaw) is a Polish film, television and theatre actor as well as journalist.

== Life and career ==
He was born on 7 May 1985 in Warsaw. He is a graduate of the Marie Curie-Skłodowska High School No. 23 in Warsaw, as well as the Collegium Civitas.

Since 2003, he has been playing the role of Igor Nowak in TVN Channel's TV soap opera Na Wspólnej. Between 2008 and 2014, he appeared on historical television series Czas honoru where he played the character of Michał Konarski, one of the Silent Unseens and from 2011 to 2013, he played the main role in Komisarz Alex, the Polish version of Inspector Rex comedy-drama TV series. In 2013, he was nominated for the Wiktor Award for Best TV Actor.

He also participated in a number of entertainment programs such as Dancing with the Stars: Taniec z gwiazdami (2005) and Little Giants talent show (2016). He appeared on the music video to the "Od A do Z" (From A to Z) song by Queens.

== Personal life ==
In 2014, he married Agnieszka Szczurek with whom he has got a daughter Róża (born 2016).

== Appearances in film and television ==
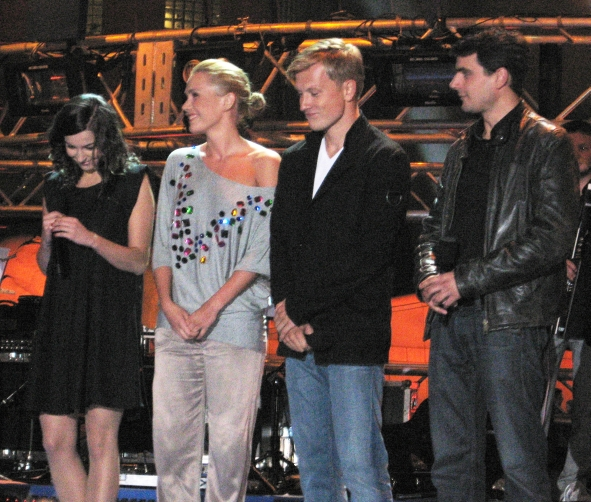
Jakub Wesołowski (second from right), 2009

- since 2003: Na Wspólnej - Igor Nowak
- 2007: Twarzą w twarz - Paweł "Brazyl" Piekarski (episode 4)
- 2007: Jutro idziemy do kina - Jerzy Bolesławski
- 2007: Dlaczego nie! - Wojtek, Gosia's friend
- 2008: Rozmowy nocą - Krzysiek, Weronika's boyfriend
- 2008: Pora mroku - Michał
- 2008: Niania - Igor Nowak (episode 92)
- 2008-2013: Czas honoru - Michał Konarski
- 2008: 39 i pół - Karol (episodes 8-10)
- 2009: Kochaj i tańcz - Platon
- 2010: Klub szalonych dziewic - Mikołaj Strabużyński
- 2010: 1920. Wojna i miłość - Bronisław Jabłoński (episodes 1–9, 11-13)
- 2012-2013: Komisarz Alex - commissioner Marek Bromski (episodes 1-32)
- 2013: Tajemnica Westerplatte - Bernard Rygielski
- 2014: Sama słodycz - Tomasz Śniadecki (episodes 5, 11, 13)
- 2014: Czas honoru. Powstanie - Michał Konarski (episodes 1-12)
- 2015-2016: Strażacy - captain Rafał Borycki (episodes 1–2, 10-20)
- 2017, 2019: Ojciec Mateusz - doctor Wojciech Schiller, Kobylicka's neighbour (episodes 220, 223, 235, 237)
- 2017-2018: O mnie się nie martw - doctor Kuba Jurkowski
- 2019: Za marzenia - Adam Wierzbicki (episodes 15, 17–21, 23-26)
- 2019: Kurier - General Sosnkowski's aide-de-camp
- since 2020: Zawsze warto - Kamil Michalski vel Radici, Ada's husband
- 2024: Go Ahead, Brother

== See also ==
- Polish cinema
- Polish Film Awards
