= Sylwia Gliwa =

Polish actress (born 1978)

- Gliwa in 2017
- Born: 7 June 1978 (age 48); Bytów, Poland
- Education: National Academy of Dramatic Art
- Occupation: Actress
- Years active: 2000–present
- Spouse: Marcin Biernacki (m. 2011; div. 2019)

Sylwia Gliwa (Polish pronunciation: [ˈsɘl.vja ˈɡli.va]; born 7 June 1978) is a Polish actress. She is best known for her role as Monika Cieślik in the soap opera Na Wspólnej, which she has played since 2003.

== Biography ==
Gliwa was born in Bytów. When she was four years old, her family moved to Tarnowskie Góry. She graduated from the in National Academy of Dramatic Art in Warsaw in 2001, and began her career at the Teatr Współczesny.

While a student, she was in a relationship with Borys Szyc. She married Marcin Biernacki, a racing driver, in 2011. Their son, Aleksander, was born in 2012. Gliwa and Biernacki divorced in 2019.

== Filmography ==
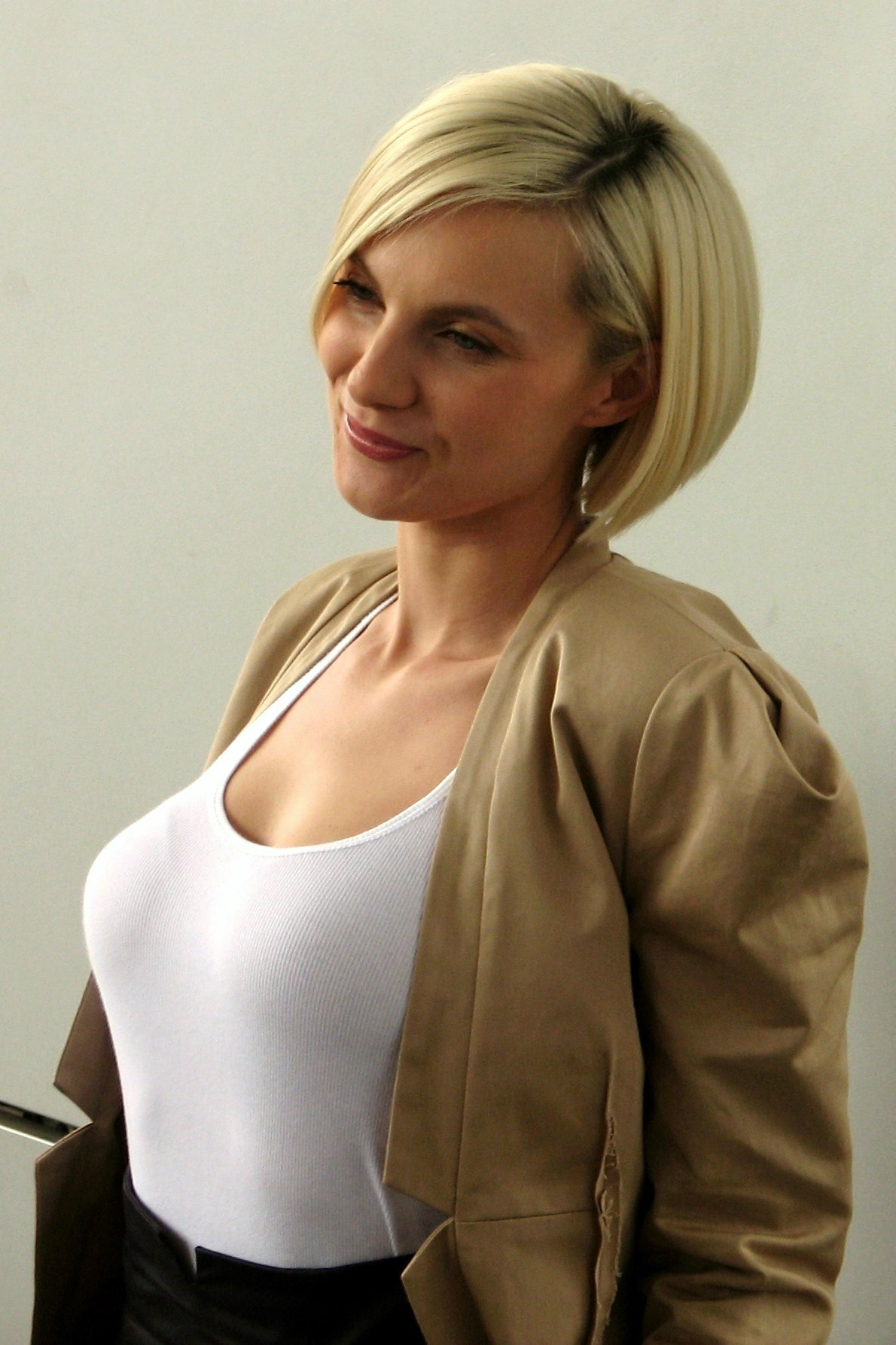
Gliwa at the Gdynia Film Festival in 2010

=== Film ===
Year	Title	Role	Ref.
2002	Chopin: Desire for Love	Concert guest	
2005	1409. Afera na zamku Bartenstein	Partisan	
2010	Fenomen	Student	
2013	Gabriel	Elwira	

=== Television ===
Year	Title	Role	Notes	Ref.
2001–2020	Na dobre i na złe	Karolina; Klara Zielińska	3 episodes	
2002–2003	Kasia i Tomek	Young woman	3 episodes	
2003	Defekt	Receptionist	1 episode	
2003–2024	Na Wspólnej	Monika Cieślik	1,144 episodes	
2005	Karol: A Man Who Became Pope	Janina Kuroń	Television film	
2006	Kopciuszek	Agnieszka	13 episodes	
2008–2009	The Ranch	Weronika	6 episodes	
2009	Doręczyciel	Justi	5 episodes	
2009–2010	First Love	Lucyna Rozen	Guest role	
2009–2016	Father Matthew	Daniela; Jolanta Danielska	2 episodes	
2011	Usta usta	Magda	2 episodes	
2015	Family.pl	Woman	1 episode	
2016	Powiedz tak!	Olga Koper	12 episodes	
2016	Artyści	Tomasz's wife	1 episode	
2021	Mecenas Porada	Hanna Borowiecka	1 episode	
2022	Komisarz Alex	Ela	1 episode	
