= PolyGram Polska =

- Parent company: PolyGram
- Founded: 1994
- Defunct: 1998
- Genre: various
- Country of origin: Warsaw, Poland
- Location: Poland

PolyGram Polska Sp. z o.o. (PolyGram Poland), was a Polish subsidiary of PolyGram. The label was founded in 1994 in Warsaw when independent record label Izabelin Studio was brought by PolyGram.

Label was closed in 1998 when PolyGram, within its Polish subsidiary was brought by Seagram and Universal Music Group was formed. PolyGram Polska catalogue have been taken over by Universal Music Polska.

PolyGram Polska bestselling artists included Edyta Bartosiewicz and Katarzyna Kowalska among others, with several albums certified Gold and Platinum in Poland.

== Selected artists ==
- Anna Maria Jopek
- Aya RL
- Closterkeller
- Edyta Bartosiewicz
- Elektryczne Gitary
- Hey
- Illusion
- Katarzyna Kowalska
- Katarzyna Nosowska
- Magma
- Maleo Reggae Rockers
- Maryla Rodowicz
- Natalia Kukulska
- Norbi
- Patrycja Kosiarkiewicz
- Perfect
- Proletaryat
- Rotary
- Sixteen
- Stare Miasto
- Subway
- Sweet Noise
- T-raperzy znad Wisły
- Wojciech Pilichowski

== See also ==
- BMG Poland
- EMI Music Poland
- Sony Music Entertainment Poland
- Sony BMG Music Entertainment Poland
- Warner Music Poland
