= Ewa Gawryluk =

Polish actress (born 1967)

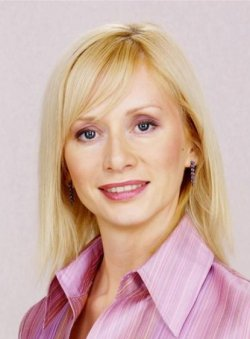

Ewa Gawryluk (born 13 December 1967 in Miastko, Poland) is a Polish actress.

A popular European film and theater actress, and widely known by her Ewa Hoffer ("Eve Hoffer") TV persona from Na Wspólnej ("The Common Folk"), Gawryluk graduated from Łódź National Higher School of Theatre and Film in 1991. She made her stage debut at the Contemporary Theatre in Warsaw, which she maintains close ties to the present day. Gawryluk also appears in the Teatr Telewizji productions as well as the TVN network's daily soap opera in Poland. She most recently appeared in Tango directed by Maciej Englert.

== Partial filmography ==
- Grzeszni i bogaci - TV series 2009
- Na Wspólnej - TV series 2003–present
- Król przedmieścia - TV series 2002
- When Grandpa Loved Rita Hayworth - 2001
- Chłop i baba
- Klan - TV series 1998-1999
- Żegnaj Rockefeller (Goodbye Rockefeller) - TV movie 1993
