= Grażyna Wolszczak =

Polish actress

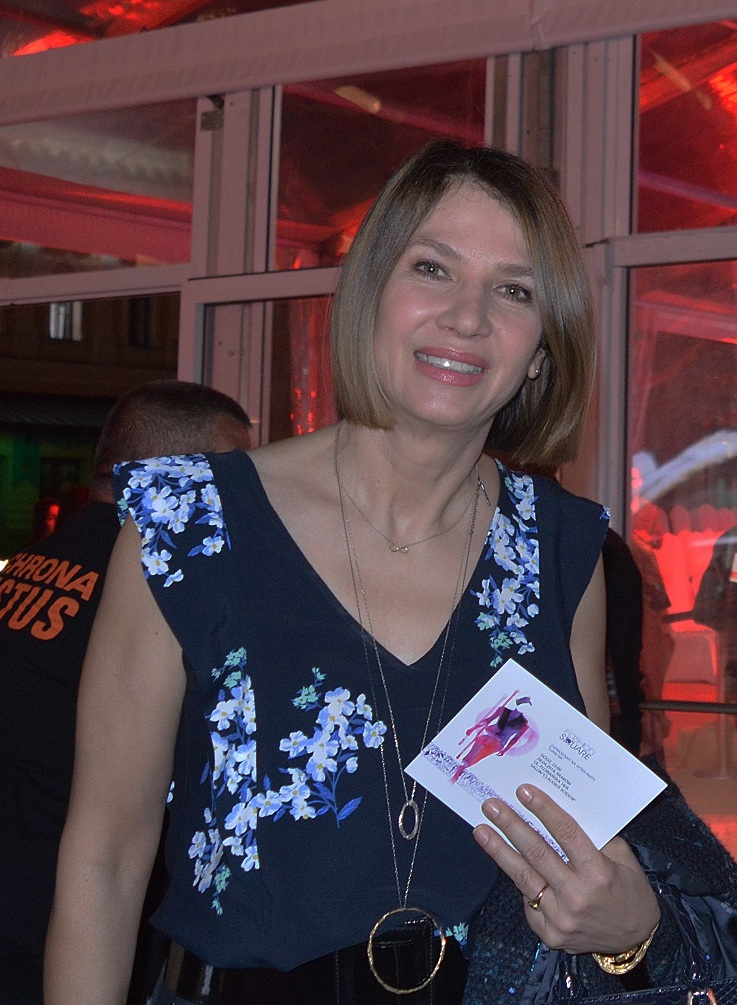
Grażyna Wolszczak

Grażyna Wolszczak (born 7 December 1958 in Gdańsk, Poland) is a Polish actress.

In 2016, she co-signed, together with hundreds of other people, a letter to Ban Ki-moon calling for a more humane drug policy.

== Filmography ==
- Na Wspólnej (2003)
- Wiedźmin TV series (2002) as Yennefer
- Wiedźmin film (2001) as Yennefer
- An Air So Pure (1997)
