= Anna Korcz =

Polish actress

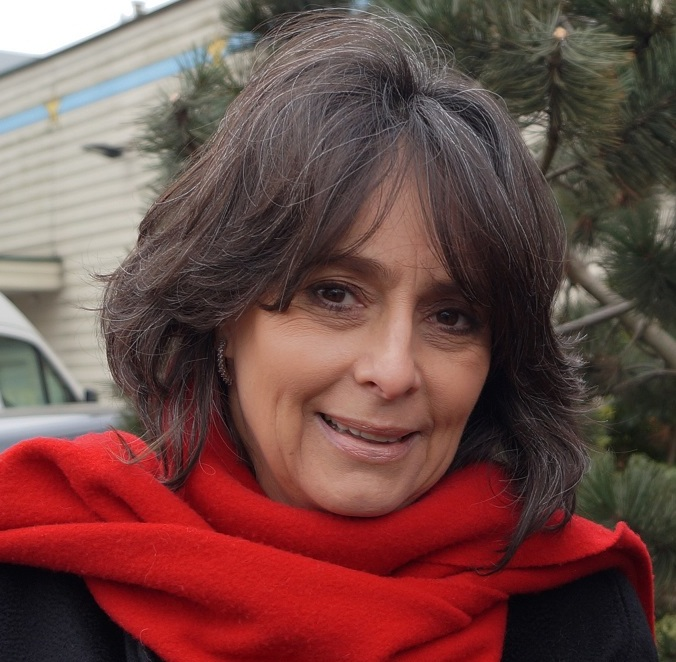
- Anna Korcz in 2019
- Born: 30 July 1968 (age 57); Warsaw, Poland
- Occupation: Actress
- Notable work: Ryś

Anna Korcz (born 30 July 1968) is a Polish actress.

== Filmography ==
- Ryś
- Ja wam pokażę!
- Na Wspólnej
- Chopin: Desire for Love (Chopin. Pragnienie miłości)
