= Julia Pietrucha =

Polish actress, singer, and model (born 1989)

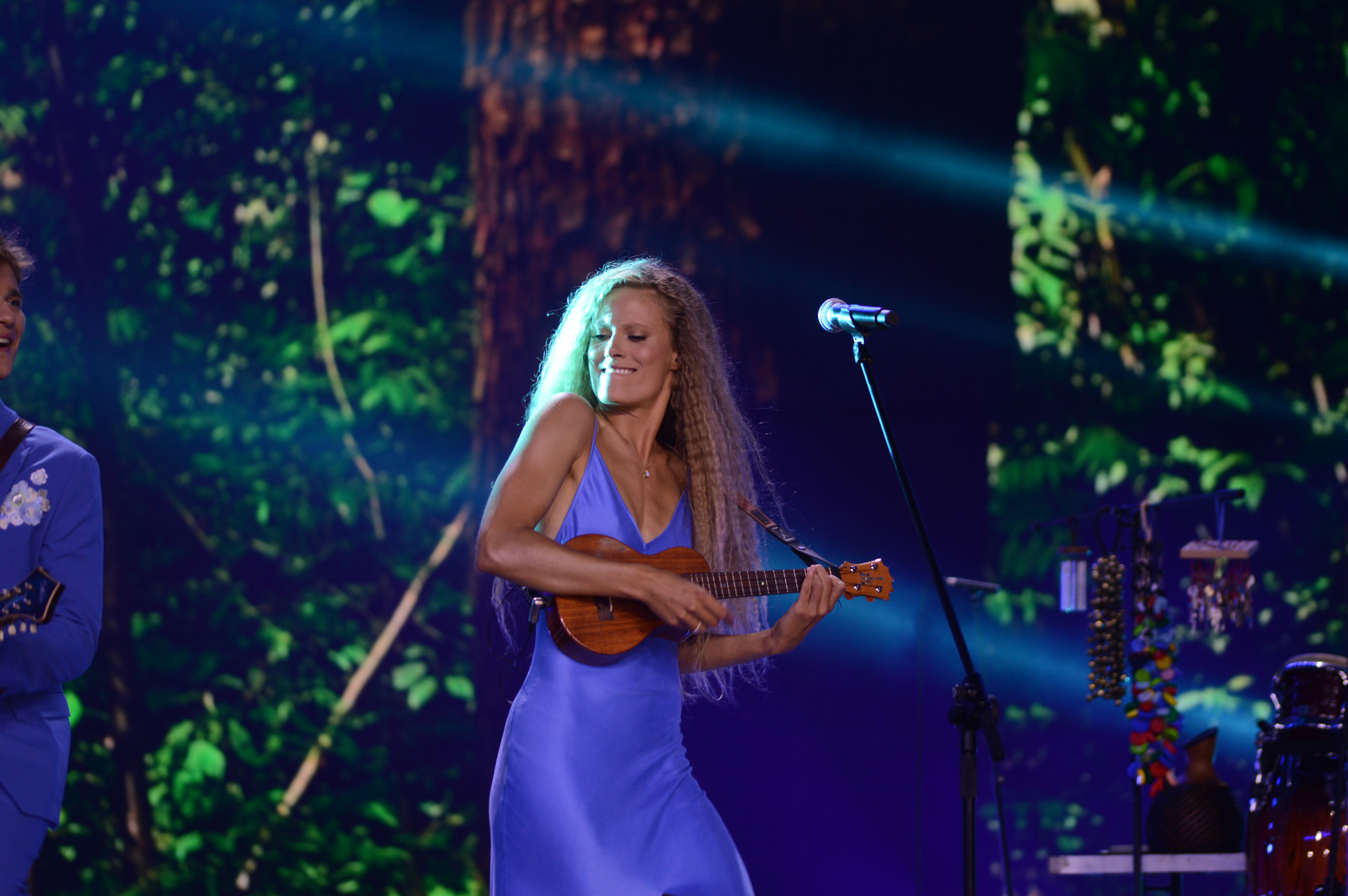
- Pietrucha in 2022
- Born: 17 March 1989 (age 37); Warsaw, Poland
- Occupations: Actress, singer, model
- Years active: 2003–present
- Website: Official website

Julia Pietrucha (Polish pronunciation: [ˈjulja pjɛˈtruxa]; born 17 March 1989 in Warsaw) is a Polish actress, singer, and model. In 2007, she won the Special Acting Award at the Gdynia Film Festival for her performance in Jutro idziemy do kina. In 2009, she played Halinka in Tatarak, a film directed by Andrzej Wajda.

Pietrucha appeared in regular roles in the television series Kochaj mnie, kochaj! and Blondynka. In 2014, she won the first episode of the Polish talent show Twoja twarz brzmi znajomo. In April 2016, she released her first album, Parsley.

== Credits ==
=== Television ===
Year	Title	Role	Notes
2003	Kasia i Tomek	Young woman (voice)	Season 2, episode 33
2003–2006	Na Wspólnej	Alicja Furga, Julia Furga	
2005–2006	Pensjonat pod Różą	Kasia Statkiewicz	
2006	Kochaj mnie, kochaj!	Julka	
2007	Jutro idziemy do kina	Zosia Paluch	TV film
2007	Regina	Kinga Stroch	
2008	39 i pół	Friend of Patryk	
2008–2011	M jak miłość	Alicja Staniszewska	
2009	Miasto z morza	Łucja Konka	
2009	Rodzina zastępcza	Marta Kowalczyk	Episode 317
2009	Naznaczony	Natalia	Episode 4
2009	Teraz albo nigdy!	Kaja	Episode 27 and 29
2009–2013	Blondynka	Sylwia Kubus	
2012	Galeria	Anita Woydatt	
2014	Ojciec Mateusz	Monika Dębowska	Episode 135

=== Films ===
Year	Title	Role	Notes
2007	Hope	Girl in phone booth	
2007	Testosteron	Mother of Tytus	
2008	Lejdis	Girl	
2009	Miasto z morza	Łucja Konka	
2009	Tatarak	Halinka	
2014	The Curse of Styria	Carmilla	
