= Maciej Kujawski =

Polish actor (1953 – 2023)

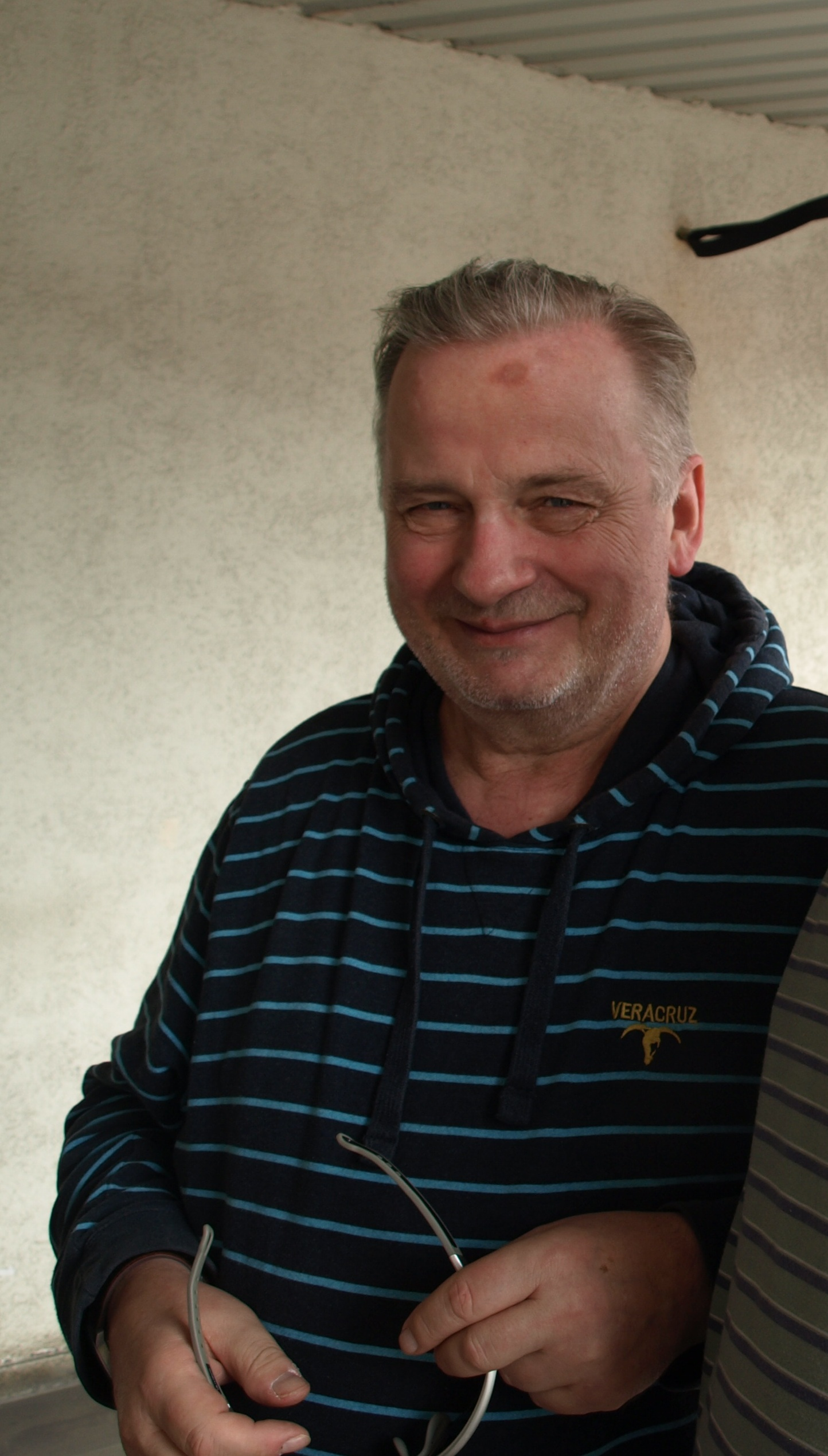
- Born: 23 February 1953; Warsaw, Poland
- Died: 25 May 2023 (aged 70)
- Years active: 1979–2023

Maciej Kujawski (23 February 1953 – 25 May 2023) was a Polish actor. He portrayed Stefan Dębek in the soap opera Na Wspólnej.

== Biography ==
Kujawski was born in Warsaw, Poland. He graduated from the Józef Wybicki High School. In 1978 he graduated from the Aleksander Zelwerowicz National Academy of Dramatic Art in Warsaw. From 1979 to 1986, he performed at the Teatr na Woli in Warsaw. From 1986 to his death, he was an actor at the Kwadrat Theatre in Warsaw. From 2002 to his death, he lent his voice to Disney productions of Winnie the Pooh. He took over this role after the late Jan Kociniak.

Kujawski died on 25 May 2023.

== Filmography ==
- 1992-2000: Ciuchcia – various roles
- 2000: Lokatorzy – Mr. Jurek (episode 4–6, 8, 12, 17, 24, 28, 31)
- 2000: Twarze i maski – theater technician (episode 4, 5)
- 2001: Graczykowie (episode 49)
- 2001-2002: Graczykowie, czyli Buła i spóła – pheromone seller (episode 8, 25, 38)
- 2006-2007: Dwie strony medalu – Marian (episode 31, 33, 35, 37, 39, 42, 44, 46–48, 50)
- 2006: Ale się kręci – Śledziewski actor (episode 3–5, 7)
- 2008–2021: Na Wspólnej – Stefan Dębek
- 2008: Egzamin z życia – Jóźwiak (episode 106)
- 2008: 39 i pół – canary (odc. 13)
- 2008: Klan – Justyna's father (episode 1590)
- 2008: Brzydula – seller (episode 50)
- 2009: Przeznaczenie – Stanisław Kustra (episode 7)
- 2011: Czas honoru – Jakubiak (episode 44)
- 2012: Prawo Agaty – security guard at Prospectrum (episode 1, 4)
- 2018: The Chairman's Ear – Lech Wałęsa (episode 39, 47)
- 2022: Tonia – Miecio
