= T-raperzy znad Wisły =

T-Raperzy Znad Wisły
- Origin: Warsaw, Poland
- Genres: hip-hop
- Years active: 1995-2000, 2009
- Labels: PolyGram Poland, Agora SA
- Members: Grzegorz Wasowski, Sławomir Szczęśniak, Lucyna Malec and Andrzej Butruk

T-Raperzy znad Wisły ("T-Rappers From Vistula") is a Polish hip-hop group founded in 1995 by Grzegorz Wasowski, Sławomir Szczęśniak, Lucyna Malec and Andrzej Butruk. In the years 1995-2000 the band was an inseparable part of a TV show called Komiczny Odcinek Cykliczny. The songs are satirical in character and can be classified as comedy hip-hop. Early in the band's career, however, they created not only rap pieces, but also disco. The group has issued 6 albums to date.

== Poczet Królów Polskich ==
T-Raperzy znad Wisły are known for their songs about Polish kings and princes, presenting their biographies with humor. Each of the band's rap songs concern a particular monarch or a summary of a well-known Polish text. T-Raperzy znad Wisły issued an album called Poczet Królów Polskich ("The List of the Kings of Poland") containing 18 tracks. Each of the songs, put chronologically, tells about the most important sovereigns of Poland, describing the crucial moments of their lives and recalling key facts. Other tracks contained on the album are funny summaries of famous books, for instance "Bolesław Prus"' Lalka, Henryk Sienkiewicz's Potop or Adam Mickiewicz's Pan Tadeusz.

The most popular piece by T-Raperzy znad Wisły is "Mieszko" - the first track of "Poczet Królów Polskich" - describing the story of Mieszko I, the first ruler of Poland. The well-known chorus "Mieszko, Mieszko, mój koleżko" ("Mieszko, Mieszko, my pal") was used in the television series Rodzina Zastępcza ("The Foster Family") and in a song by Grupa Operacyjna, a Polish hip-hop band. Billboard defined their song as "a lesson in Polish history set to a hip-hop beat".

== A 2009 album ==
After a several-year pause, on November 20, 2009, Traperzy znad Wisły issued a new album entitled "Ekshumacja 2," consisting of their songs from "Poczet Królów Polskich," remastered and with new beats added Apart from the songs concerning monarchs, the band recorded "Starfest" featuring the famous Polish artists Edyta Geppert, Stanisław Soyka, Aga Zaryan, Fisz, Kasia Nosowska, Łona, Anna Maria Jopek, Zygmunt Staszczyk, Dorota Miśkiewicz, Lech Janerka and Marek Kondrat.

Co-founder Andrzej Butruk died at 47 in 2011.
