= Ewa Gorzelak-Dziduch =

Polish actress (born 1974)

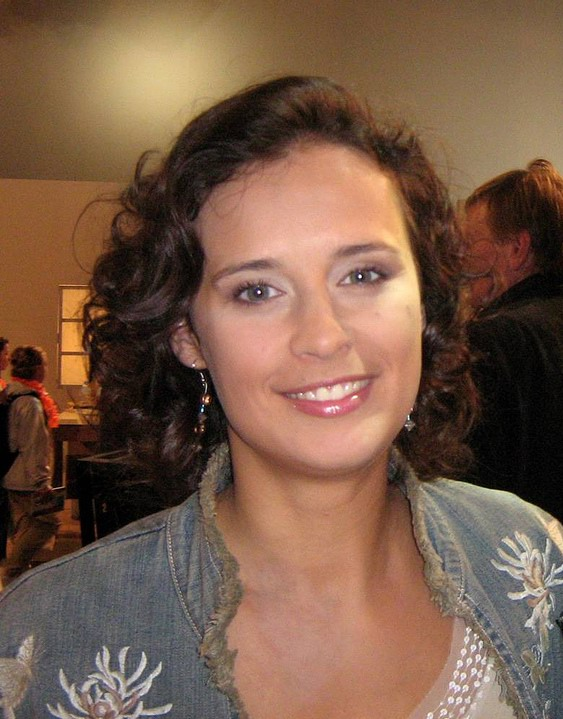
- Ewa Gorzelak-Dziduch
- Born: 3 November 1974 (age 50); Łódź, Poland

Ewa Gorzelak-Dziduch [ˈɛva ɡɔˈʐɛlak ˈd͡ʑidux], often known as Ewa Gorzelak (born 3 November 1974 in Łódź, Poland) is a Polish television and film actress. She has appeared in a number of Polish movies and television soap operas and other series, including 55 episodes of the popular soap M jak miłość, in which she played lab technician Dorota Stadnicka. She is a graduate of the State Theatre Academy in Warsaw.

In December 2005, following the experience of her son's cancer treatment, she became one of the founders of the Nasze dzieci ("Our Children") charity foundation, which provides support to children with cancer and their families.

== Filmography ==
- Matka swojej matki (1996)
- Zaklęta (1997) (TV mini-series)
- Farba (1997)
- Złotopolscy (1998) (TV series)
- Amok (1998)
- Dom (1 episode, 1999) (TV)
- Skok (1999)
- Czułość i kłamstwa (1999) (TV series)
- Ostatnia misja (2000)
- Zakochani (2000)
- Na dobre i na złe (1 episode, 2000) (TV)
- Tam i z powrotem (2002)
- As (2002) (TV mini-series)
- Na Wspólnej (2003) (TV series)
- Pensjonat Pod Różą (2 episodes, 2006)
- Falszerze. Powrót sfory (2007) (TV mini-series)
- PitBull (1 episode, 2008) (TV)
- M jak miłość (55 episodes, 2006–2009) (TV)
- Ojciec Mateusz (1 episode, 2009) (TV)
