= Barbara Mularczyk =

Polish actress (born 1984)

- Born: Barbara Mularczyk; 5 April 1984 (age 42); Wrocław, Poland
- Education: National Academy of Theatre Arts; University of Wrocław
- Occupations: Actress, journalist
- Years active: 1999–present
- Spouse: Rafał Potocki (m. 2011)
- Children: 2

Barbara Mularczyk-Potocka (Polish: [barˈba.ra muˈlar.t͡ʂɘ̟k pɔˈtɔt͡s.ka]; born 5 April 1984) is a Polish journalist and television actress. She is best known for her role as Mariola Kiepska, one of the main characters in the Polsat sitcom television series The Lousy World (1999–2022). She also appeared in the thriller drama film D.I.L. (2002), as well as in the Polsat drama television series First Love (2011), the TV Puls drama television series Pawned & Perilous (2024), and the TV Puls crime television series Fear District (2024–2025).

== Biography ==
Barbara Mularczyk was born on 5 April 1984 in Wrocław, Poland. She is a daughter of an actor Jerzy Mularczyk. As a child, she performed in the children's section of the Kalambur Theatre in Wrocław, and later in the New Kalambur theatre group. Mularczyk graduated with a degree in acting from the Wrocław Faculty of Acting of the National Academy of Theatre Arts, and with a degree in journalism from the Institute of Journalism and Social Communications of the Wrocław University.

From 1999 to 2022, Mularczyk portrayed Mariola Kiepska, one of the main characters in the Polsat sitcom television series The Lousy World. It made her recognizable nation-wide in Poland, and remains her most famous performance. She also appeared on the thriller drama film D.I.L. (2002), as well as in the Polsat drama television series First Love (2011), the TV Puls drama television series Pawned & Perilous (2024), and the TV Puls crime television series Fear District (2024–2025). Mularczyk also works as a journalist specialised in the public relations.

== Personal life ==
In 2011, she married Rafał Potocki, with whom, she has two children, Aleksandra (born 2012), and Jan (born 2016).

== Filmography ==
Year	Title	Role	Notes	Ref.
1999–2022	The Lousy World	Mariola Kiepska	Television series; main role; 373 episodes	
2002	D.I.L.	Aleksandra	Feature film	
2008	Cień	Girl in love	Short film	
2011	First Love	Hanna	Television series; episode no. 1340	
2024	Fear District	Weronika Nowaczyk	Television series; episode: "Królowa śniegu"	
2024	Pawned & Perilous	Tapik's mother	Television series; episode no. 50	
2025	Fear District	Beata Ekert	Television series; episode: "Kamav tut – chcę ciebie"	
