= Lucyna Malec =

Polish actress and singer (born 1966)

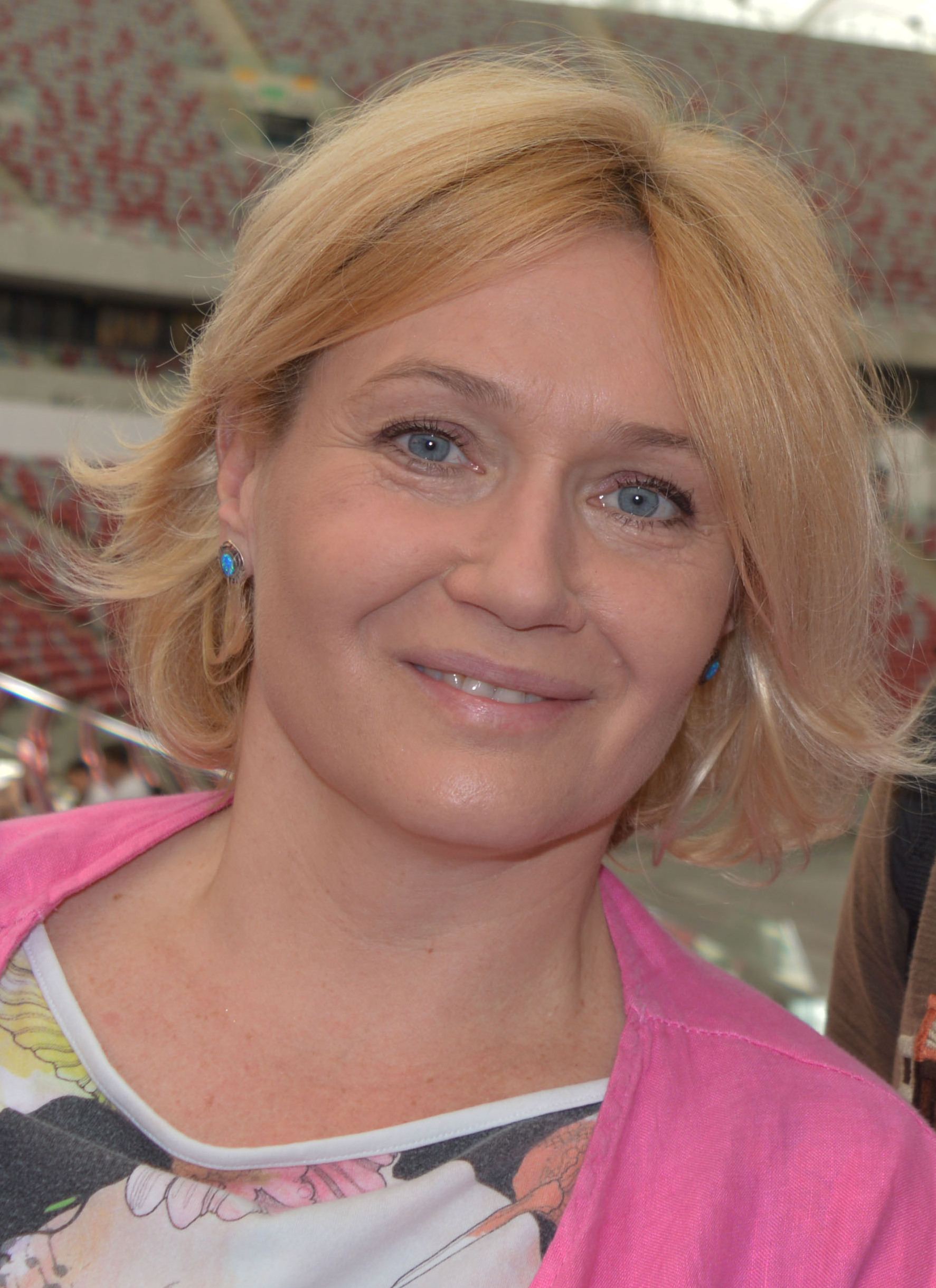
Lucyna Malec, 2017

Lucyna Malec, also Lucyna Malec-Mayer (born July 27, 1966) Polish theater, film, television and dubbing actress, and singer.

She was born in Bielsko-Biała and graduated from the acting department of the National Higher School of Theatre in 1989.

In 1989 she co-founded T-raperzy znad Wisły ("T-Rappers From Vistula"). a Polish hip-hop group.

== Awards ==
- 2024:Gloria Artis Medal for Merit to Culture
- 2021:Theatre of Polskie Radio Award "Wielki Splendor", for "sensitivity in building her heroines; and for a huge heart for working at the Polish Radio Theatre"
