= Zdrójkowski =

Zdrójkowski (Polish: [zdrujˈkɔf.ski]; feminine: Zdrójkowska, plural: Zdrójkowscy) is a Polish surname.

Notable people with this surname include:

- Adam Zdrójkowski (born 2000), a Polish actor;
- Jakub Zdrójkowski (born 2000), a Polish actor;
- Krystian Zdrojkowski (born 1982), a Polish short track speed skater.
