= Adam Zdrójkowski =

Polish actor (born 2000)

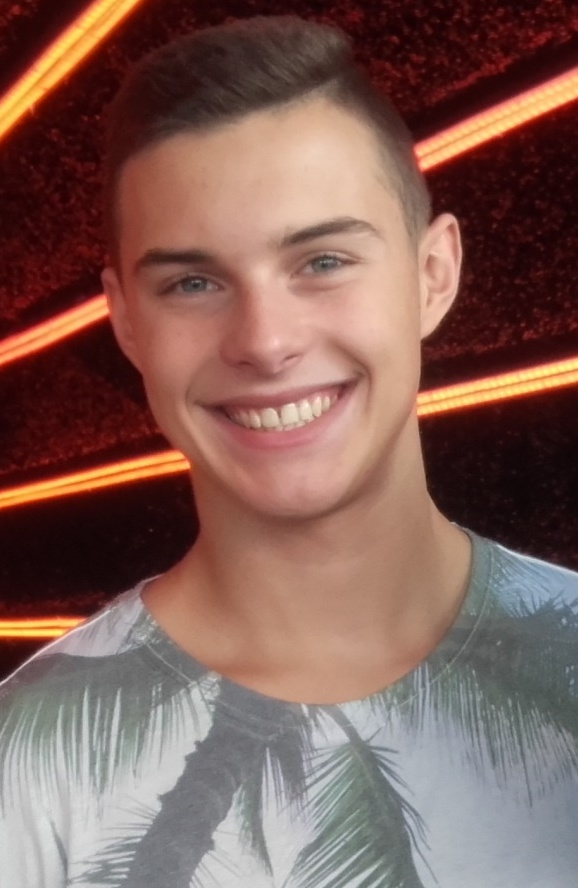
- Adam Zdrójkowski in 2016.
- Born: 29 May 2000 (age 26); Warsaw, Poland
- Occupations: Actor, television presenter
- Years active: 2008–present
- Relatives: Jakub Zdrójkowski (brother)

Adam Zdrójkowski (Polish: [ˈa.dam zdrujˈkɔf.ski]; born 29 May 2000) is a Polish television and film actor, and television presenter. He is best known for portraying Kuba Boski, one of the main characters in the TVP2 comedy series Family.pl (2011–2020, 2025–2026). Zdrójkowski also portrayed Paweł in the Polsat sitcom television series Foster Family, Filip in the Polsat soap opera series First Love (2016), Jacek in the TVP1 drama series The Blonde (2020), hairdresser Patryk in the Polsat drama series Friends (2022–2025), and Gromek in the TVP1 period soap opera series The Crown of the Kings (2023–2024), and its sequel, Kings (2024–2025). He also starred as Szymon, one of the main characters in the 2022 romantic comedy film Holidays Backwards: Christmas. Zdrójkowski also appeared in films Superheroes (2010), Futro z misia (2019), Love Tasting (2020), Furioza (2021), and Krime Story. Love Story (2022).

Zdrójkowski was a backstage host in the TVP2 talent shows The Voice Kids in 2018, and The Voice of Poland in 2019 and 2020. Since 2025, he hosts the Polsat game show Must Be the Music. He was also a contestant in game shows such as Dancing with the Stars. Taniec z gwiazdami (2016), Twoja twarz brzmi znajomo (2021), and Azja Express (2023).

== Biography ==
Adam Zdrójkowski was born on 29 May 2000, in Warsaw, Poland. He is the son of Dariusz Zdrójkowski and Edyta Zdrójkowska, and the twin brother of actor Jakub Zdrójkowski.

In 2003, he and his brother appeared on the TVN game show Chwila prawdy, on which his mother was a contestant.

In 2008, Zdrójkowski was an extra in a feature film The Offsiders. In 2009, he and his brother, Jakub, portrayed twin brothers Paweł and Piotr in the Polsat sitcom television series Foster Family. The same year, they also portrayed twin brothers Jimmy and Matthew in the TVP1 drama series The Londoners. From 2011 to 2020, he portrayed Kuba Boski, one of the main characters in the TVP2 comedy series Family.pl, for which he is best known. From 2025, Zdrójkowski also appears in its revival continuation. He also portrayed recurring characters of Filip in the Polsat soap opera series First Love (2016), Jacek in the TVP1 drama series The Blonde (2020), hairdresser Patryk in the Polsat drama series Friends (2022–2025), and Gromek in the TVP1 period soap opera series The Crown of the Kings (2023–2024), and its sequel, Kings (2024–2025). Zdrójkowski also appeared in the television series Na dobre i na złe (2011, 2015), Father Matthew (2015), First Love (2016), and The Blonde (2020). He also starred as Szymon, one of the main characters in the 2022 romantic comedy film Holidays Backwards: Christmas. Zdrójkowski also appeared in films Superheroes (2010), Futro z misia (2019), Love Tasting (2020), Furioza (2021), and Krime Story. Love Story (2022).

In 2012, Zdrójkowski was a contestant in the TVP2 game show Familiada, in a team consisting of child actors. In 2016, he participated in the Polsat talent show Dancing with the Stars. Taniec z gwiazdami. In 2018, Zdrójkowski was a backstage host of the TVP2 talent show The Voice Kids. He participated and won in the TVP2 talent show Dance Dance Dance, in a team together with Wiktoria Gąsiewska, with whom he was in a romantic relationship at the time. Zdrójkowski was a backstage host of the TVP2 talent show The Voice of Poland in 2019 and 2020. In 2021, participated in the Polsat talent show Twoja twarz brzmi znajomo. In 2023, he was one of the contestants in the TVN reality reality show Azja Express, forming a team together with his father. Since 2025, Zdrójkowski co-hosts the Polsat game show Must Be the Music.

== Filmography ==
=== Films ===
Year	Title	Role	Notes	Ref.
2008	The Offsiders	No data	Feature film	
2010	Superheroes	Antoś	Feature film	
2012	Being Like Deyna	Altar server	Feature film	
2019	Futro z misia	Janusz's son	Feature film	
2020	Love Tasting	Kowal	Feature film	
2021	Furioza	Drug dealer	Feature film	
2021	Świat pełen Niespodzianek	Raccoon	Television play	
2022	Krime Story. Love Story	Kica	Feature film	
2022	Holidays Backwards: Christmas	Szymon	Feature film	

=== Television series ===
Year	Title	Role	Notes	Ref.
2009	Foster Family	Paweł	Main role; 16 episodes	
2009	The Londoners	Jimmy	3 episodes	
2011	Na dobre i na złe	Rudy	Episode: "Zniknięcie Agaty" (no. 469)	
2015	Na dobre i na złe	Dominik Lesiak	Episode: "Granica bezpieczeństwa" (no. 608)	
2011–2020, 2025–2026	Family.pl	Kuba Boski	Main role; 277 episodes	
2013	Boscy w sieci	Kuba Boski	Web miniseries; main role; 13 episodes	
2014	I'll Be Fine	Patryk Radwan	Episode no. 12	
2014	Father Matthew	Adrian Lewandowski	Episode: "Żart" (no. 155)	
2015	Spokojnie, to tylko ekonomia!	Krystian Walczak	2 episodes	
2016	First Love	Filip	9 episodes	
2018	W rytmie serca	Michał Wawrykiewicz	Episode: "Romeo i Julia" (no. 23)	
2020	The Blonde	Jacek	7 episodes	
2021	Komisarz Mama	Tadeusz Dewódzki	Episode no. 7	
2022–2025	Friends	Patryk, a hairdresser	Recurring role; 65 episodes	
2023	Camera Café. Nowe parzenie	Delivery person	Episode no. 13	
2023–2024	The Crown of the Kings	Gromek	Recurring role; 38 episodes	
2024	Algorytm miłości	Pablo	6 episodes	
2024–2025	Kings	Gromek	Recurring role; 7 episodes	

=== Television programmes ===
Year	Title	Role	Notes	Ref.
2003	Chwila prawdy	Himself (guest)	Game show; 1 episode	
2012	Familiada	Himself (contestant)	Game show; 1 episode	
2015	Kuba Wojewódzki	Himself (guest)	Talk show; 1 episode	
2015	Mamy cię!	Himself (guest)	Reality show' 1 episode	
2016	Dancing with the Stars. Taniec z gwiazdami	Himself (contestant)	Talent show; 8 episodes	
2016	Lip Sync Battle. Ustawka	Himself (contestant)	Game show; 1 episode	
2018	Big Music Quiz	Himself (contestant)	Game show; 1 episode	
2018	The Voice Kids	Himself (co-host)	Talent show	
2018	The Story of My Life. Historia naszego życia	Himself (guest)	Talk show; 1 episode	
2019	Dance Dance Dance	Himself (contestant)	Talent show; 12 episodes	
2019–2020	The Voice of Poland	Himself (co-host)	Talent show	
2021	Twoja twarz brzmi znajomo	Himself (contestant)	Talent show; 10 episodes	
2023	Azja Express	Himself (contestant)	Reality show; 11 episodes	
2023	MasterChef Junior	Himself (contestant)	Game show; 1 episode	
2024	Czas na Show. Drag Me Out	Himself (guest)	Talent show	
2025–2026	Must Be the Music	Himself (co-host)	Talent show; 21 episodes	

=== Polish-language dubbing ===
Year	Title	Role	Notes	Ref.
2016	Sing	Johnny	Feature film	
2017	The Emoji Movie	Hysterical Laughter Emoji	Feature film	
2019	Birds of a Feather	Manou	Feature film	
2020	Red Shoes and the Seven Dwarfs	Hans	Feature film; original released in 2019	

=== Audio plays ===
Year	Title	Role
2022	Szatan z siódmej klasy	Adam Cisowski

== Accolades and nominations ==
Awards and nominations received by Adam Zdrójkowski
Award	Year	Category	Nominated work	Result	Ref.
Nickelodeon Kids' Choice Awards	2019	Favorite Polish Star	—N/a	Nominated	
Telecameras	2017	Hope of Television	—N/a	Nominated	
