= Krzysztof Dracz =

Polish actor

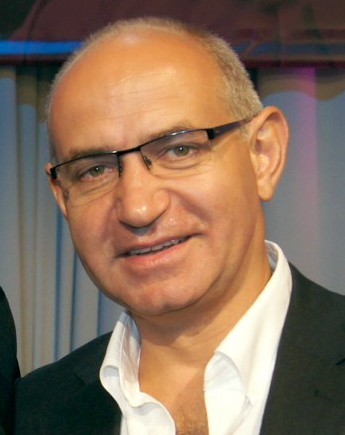
- Krzysztof Dracz in 2012.
- Born: September 20, 1961 (age 64); Brzeg Dolny, Poland
- Education: AST National Academy of Theatre Arts
- Occupations: Actor; Directo; Screenwriter; Academic
- Years active: 1980–present

Krzysztof Dracz (Polish: [ˈkʂɘʂ.tɔf ˈdrat͡ʂ]; born 20 September 1961) is a stage, television, film, and voice actor, theatre director, and screenwriter. He is also an academic of theater arts at the Faculty of Acting of Wrocław branch of the AST National Academy of Theatre Arts.

== Biography ==
Krzysztof Dracz was born on 20 September 1961 in Brzeg Dolny, Poland.

In 1984, he graduated from the Faculty of Acting of Wrocław branch of the AST National Academy of Theatre Arts. He defended his diploma in 1989. He is a professor of theater arts at the said university.

From 1984 to 2004, he was a member of the Wrocław Polish Theatre. From 2004, he has been a member of the Warsaw Dramatic Theatre.

== Filmography ==
=== Films ===
Year	Title	Role	Notes	Ref.
1991	Ósmy krąg	Stolarz	Television play	
1992	Herkules i Stajnia Augiasza	Tantalos	Television play	
1992	Zbrodnia z premedytacją	Antoni	Television play	
1992	Safari, czyli ostatnia jednoaktówka z życia...	Journalist	Television play	
1993	Gra o brzasku	Van Bogner	Television play	
1993	Komediant	Ferucio	Television play	
1994	Złowiony. Rekonstrukcje		Television play	
1994	Pijacy	Ebriacki	Television play	
1994	Polska śmierć	Colonel's assistant		
1995	Kasia z Heilbronnu	Gottschaliik	Television play	
1995	W krainie Oz	Lumberjack	Television play	
1996	Kiedyś w roku dwudziestym	Chaim Szmukler	Television play	
1996	Improwizacje wrocławskie	Boverio	Television play	
1997	Śledztwo	Dr. Soerensen	Television play	
1997	Farba	Gynaecologist		
1997	Immanuel Kant	Fryderyk	Television play	
1997	Immanuel Kant	Parrot	Television play	
1997	Diabeł Przewrotny	Pedagogue	Television play	
1998	Kartoteka rozrzucona	Peasant	Television play	
1998	Figurki Pana Gracjana	Poet	Television play	
1998	Prawiek i inne czasy	Paweł	Television play	
1998	Kartoteka rozrzucona	Peasant	Television play	
1999	Mania czy Ania	Narrator	Television play; also assistant director	
1999	Ostatnia misja	Muran's informator		
1999	Samoobrona	Zięba	Television play	
1999	Niech no tylko zakwitną jabłonie		Television play	
1999	Historia PRL według Mróżka	Teacher	Television play	
1999	Historia PRL według Mróżka	Tree hollow beehive carver	Television play	
1999	Historia PRL według Mróżka	Camp commandant	Television play	
2000	Czarodziejskie krzesiwo	King	Television play	
2000	Republika Marzeń	Leopold	Television play	
2000	Noga dla Józefa	Inmate	Television play	
2000	Żelazna konstrukcja	Michał Johnson	Television play	
2001	Czarodziejskie krzesiwo	King	Television play	
2001	Siedem dalekich rejsów	August Leter	Television play	
2001	Przemiana 1999	Physician #2	Television play	
2002	Wizyta starszej pani	Teacher	Television play	
2002	Sfora: Bez litości	District attorney		
2003	Guanipa	Physician	Short film	
2004	W dół kolorowym wzgórzem	Wiesiek		
2004	Długi weekend	Major, Bogdan's commander		
2004	Obrona	Bolesław Kulicki	Television play	
2004	Dobry adres	Karol Goldfarb	Television play	
2004	Miłości	Physician	Television play	
2004	Mary Stuart	Raul		
2005	Profesor	Ludwik	Short film	
2005	Doskonałe popołudnie	Marek		
2005	The Collector	Romański		
2006	Hiena	Police officer		
2006	Co słonko widziało	Czajkowski		
2007	Oskarżeni. Śmierć sierżanta Karosa	Cezary Towiński	Television play	
2007	Generał polskich nadziei... Władysław Anders 1892–1970	Lavrentiy Beria	Documentary film	
2008	Little Moscow	General Secretary of the Polish United Workers' Party		
2008	Willa szczęśćia	Lavrentiy Beria	Television play	
2008	Kryptonim Gracz	Suppervisor of the Polish sportsteam	Television play	
2008	Ballada o kluczu	Boss	Television play	
2010	Wymazywanie	Distant relative	Television play	
2010	Mała matura 1947	Prosecutor		
2011	Suicide Room	Minister of Finance		
2011	Battle of Warsaw 1920	Leon Trotsky		
2011	Hotel Lux	Lavrentiy Beria		
2011	Wyjazd integracyjny	Świat Deserów manager		
2011	80 Million	Docent		
2011	Powidoki	Włodzimierz Sokorski	Television play	
2012	Daas	Physician		
2013	Naturalni	Pshychologist	Short film	
2013	Traffic Department	Świtoń		
2014	Jack Strong	Wojciech Jaruzelski		
2014	Obywatel	Head teacher		
2014	Ontologiczny dowód na moje istnienie	Shelley's father	Short film	
2015	Karbala	Antczak		
2015	Chryzantemy	Piotr Jasiński, Kinga's father	Short film	
2015	Zgaga	Husband	Television play	
2016	Humani	Father	Television play	
2017	The Art of Loving: Story of Michalina Wislocka	Bishop Józef		
2017	Cudzoziemcy w powstaniu warszawskim	Cook from Italy	Documentary film	
2017	Córka	Kuba's father	Short film	
2018	Playing Hard	Piotr		
2019	List z tamtego świata	Adam Dziurawiec	Television play	
2019	Ekspedycja	Vodun	Television play	
2019	A niech to gęś kopnie	Woolf	Television play	
2021	The Hero	Uncle	Short film	
2021	Polowanie	Witold	Television play	
2022	Prophet	Wojciech Jaruzelski		
2022	8 rzeczy, których nie wiecie o facetach			
2023	Doppelgänger. The Double	Colonel		
2024	Justice	Henryk Szwed		
2025	Zaprawdę Hitler umarł	Berek		

=== Television series ===
Year	Title	Role	Notes	Ref.
1986	Na kłopoty… Bednarski	Jockey	Episode: "Statek nadziei" (no. 4)	
1988	The Master and Margarita	Piatnażko	Episode: "The Master" (no. 2)	
2000	Chłop i baba	Roberto	Main cast	
2000	O czym szumią kierpce	Adolf Hitler	Episode: "Tajemnice starego domu" (no. 2)	
2002	Miodowe lata	Jerzy Grad	Episode: "Kanalersi" (no. 83)	
2002	Sfora	District attorney	Episodes no. 7–8	
2002	The Lousy World	Member of Sejm	Episode: "Słuchacz przysięgły: (no. 104)	
2002	The Lousy World	Rodrigez	Episode: "Flamingo" (no. 111)	
2002	The Lousy World	Jerzy Bimbał	Episode: "Uśmiech losu" (no. 127)	
2002	The Lousy World	Stefan Kozłowski	Episode: "Ostatni cham" (no. 129)	
2003	The Lousy World	City councilmember	Episode: "Expo" (no. 136)	
2003	The Lousy World	Jan Kantyn Berbeć	Episode: "...a robić nie ma komu" (no. 141)	
2003	The Lousy World	Zorro	Episode: "Zorro" (no. 147)	
2004	The Lousy World	Parson	Episode: "Krypta" (no. 162)	
2004	The Lousy World	Meditation Master	Episode: "Nieznośna letkość bytu" (no. 165)	
2004	The Lousy World	Ricardo Santos "Diablo" Crossfallos Posampa	Episode: "Odlot" (no. 167)	
2007	The Lousy World	Ireneusz Nabrzeżny	Episode: "Bezpieczeństwo i higiena życia" (no. 227)	
2007	The Lousy World	Salomon Baba	Episode: "Salomon Baba" (no. 253)	
2007	The Lousy World	Józef Szyszka	Episode: "Marsz" (no. 256)	
2007	The Lousy World	Engeener Kozłowski	Episode: "Kicha kręcona" (no. 258)	
2007	The Lousy World	Clerk	Episode: "Kocham biurokrację" (no. 270)	
2007	The Lousy World	Minister Edgar Pacierz	Episode: "Euro" (no. 276)	
2007, 2016	The Lousy World	Art patron	Episodes: "Kicha kręcona" (no. 258), "Sto jaj" (no. 482)	
2008	The Lousy World	Minister Kossak	Episode: "Pułapka na myszy" (no. 281)	
2008, 2019	The Lousy World	Vendor Stasiek	Episodes: "Ładne pieniążki" (no. 285), "Morfeusz" (no. 306), "Duch Malinowskiej" (no. 555)	
2009	The Lousy World	Brus	Episode: "Kochaj albo tańcz" (no. 311)	
2009	The Lousy World	Dr. Molęda	Episode: "Syn Nilu" (no. 318)	
2009	The Lousy World	Pastor O'Hara	Episode: "Wszechobecny" (no. 319)	
2010	The Lousy World	Janusz Marini	Episode: "Dla dorosłych" (no. 329)	
2010	The Lousy World	Vittorio	Episode: "Czosnkowy Dziad" (no. 341)	
2010	The Lousy World	Member of Sejm	Episode: "Rzeczy, o których się fizjologom nie śniło" (no. 342)	
2010	The Lousy World	Professor Twardowski	Episode: "Kosmiczna odyseja"	
2010	The Lousy World	Witch	Episode: "Świąteczna ballada o problemach sąsiada" (no. 351)	
2010, 2013	The Lousy World	Jan Kobielak	Episodes: "Ósme dziecko stróża" (no. 336), "Bomboni" (no. 429)	
2011	The Lousy World	Native American chief	Episode: "Tryptyk dolnośląski cz.I Ostatni Wódz Plemienia Szoszonów" (no. 353)	
2011	The Lousy World	Krzysztof Krawczyk	Episode: "Salto" (no. 361)	
2011	The Lousy World	Marian Paździoch disguised as a lawyer	Episode: "Uczeń czarnoksiężnika" (no. 363)	
2011	The Lousy World	Fikuś	Episode: "Czułe słówka" (no. 366)	
2011	The Lousy World	Party member	Episode: "Trzystu" (no. 368)	
2011	The Lousy World	Paragwajski	Episode: "Coming Out" (no. 369)	
2011	The Lousy World	Professor	Episode: "Pożegnanie z Afryką" (no. 372)	
2011	The Lousy World	Death	Episode: "Dzieje grzechu" (no. 374)	
2011	The Lousy World	Pietrucha	Episode: "Dzieje grzechu" (no. 374)	
2012	The Lousy World	Man	Episode: "Kapelusz Dżeksona" (no. 383)	
2012	The Lousy World	Dr. Andrzej Częścik	Episode: "Chłopi" (no. 385)	
2012	The Lousy World	Cook	Episode: "Poszukiwana poszukiwany" (no. 389)	
2012	The Lousy World	Janusz	Episode: "Od Judasza do Kamasza" (no. 390)	
2012	The Lousy World	Physician	Episode: "Erotikon" (no. 394)	
2012	The Lousy World	Therapist	Episode: "Bełkot" (no. 396)	
2012	The Lousy World	Stasio	Episode: "EuroKoko" (no. 397)	
2013	The Lousy World	Mechanic Kurdzielak	Episode: "Gorzelak, Kobielak i Majster Kurdzielak" (no. 409)	
2013	The Lousy World	Dr. Kochanek	Episode: "Fakty i mity" (no. 425)	
2013	The Lousy World	Vendor	Episode: "Sekrety i kłamstwa" (no. 427)	
2013	The Lousy World	Stefano	Episode: "Królowa balu" (no. 431)	
2013–2015, 2019	The Lousy World	Priest	Episodes: "Krótki film o męskości" (no. 416), "Sceny z życia małżeńskiego" (no. 437), "Lśnienie" (no. 439), "Okazja" (no. 448), "Ja to załatwię" (no. 457), "Paradoks" (no. 465), "Memento mori" (no. 477), "Nasz człowiek z Paragwaju" (no. 542), "Wewnętrzny ogród" (no. 559)	
2014	The Lousy World	Politician	Episode: "Żarty żarciki" (no. 433)	
2014	The Lousy World	Man	Episode: "Zagraniczniak" (no. 435)	
2014	The Lousy World	Wiśniak	Episode: "Ludzie bezdomni" (no. 442)	
2014	The Lousy World	Stupid Piotruś	Episode: "Głupi Piotruś" (no. 446)	
2014	The Lousy World	Sister Irena	Episode: "Kobieta za ladą" (no. 456)	
2014	The Lousy World	Engeenger Mąka	Episode: "Kobieta za ladą" (no. 456)	
2014, 2017	The Lousy World	Professor	Episodes: "Nacopoco" (no. 436), "Złoty pociąg" (no. 505), "Poza zasięgiem" (no. 510), "Tłusty czwartek" (no. 514)	
2015	The Lousy World	Piszczyk	Episode: "Piszczyk" (no. 464),	
2015	The Lousy World	Elderly woman from Klecin	Episode: "Paradoks" (no. 465)	
2015	The Lousy World	Kurczynoga	Episode: "Bliżej człowieka" (no. 466)	
2015	The Lousy World	Docent	Episode: "Małpia grypa" (no. 474)	
2015	The Lousy World	Bronisław Wawrzyniec	Episode: "Dinozaur" (no. 476)	
2015	The Lousy World	Police officer	Episode: "Wyjadacz" (no. 479)	
2015–2016, 2018	The Lousy World	Physician	Episodes: "Gdzie jest Karolak?" (no. 472), "La la la" (no. 485), "Ciuciubabka" (no. 533)	
2016	The Lousy World	Talarek	Episode: "Diabelski młyn" (no. 489)	
2016	The Lousy World	Roman	Episode: "Ukulele" (no. 494)	
2016	The Lousy World	Dr. Wiktor Frankenstein	Episode: "Upiór" (no. 495)	
2016	The Lousy World	Elderly man	Episode: "Dziki Dziad" (no. 496)	
2016	The Lousy World	Clavichord player	Episode: "Dzień Ojca" (no. 500)	
2016	The Lousy World	Company chairperson	Episode: "Motywator" (no. 503)	
2017	The Lousy World	Hypnotist	Episode: "Okruchy pamięci" (no. 511)	
2017	The Lousy World	Staszka	Episode: "Okruchy pamięci" (no. 511)	
2017	The Lousy World	Adolf Hitler	Episode: "Zmiana czasu" (no. 520)	
2017	The Lousy World	Kieliszkowski	Episode: "Non profit" (no. 523)	
2017	The Lousy World	Kościej	Episode: "Arcyfakt" (no. 524)	
2017	The Lousy World	Kobielak	Episode: "Fachowiec" (no. 525)	
2017	The Lousy World	Grzegorz Czyżyk	Episode: "Orinoko" (no. 526)	
2018	The Lousy World	President of Poland	Episode: "Zmiana" (no. 535)	
2018	The Lousy World	Member of Sejm	Episode: "Trudno powiedzieć" (no. 538)	
2019	The Lousy World	Kotlarczyk	Episode: "Alternatywy 3/4" (no. 547)	
2019	The Lousy World	Professor Pączek	Episode: "Europejski obywatel" (no. 561)	
2019	The Lousy World	Antique dealer	Episode: "Naprawa Ferdka" (no. 564)	
2021	The Lousy World	Scollar from the United Kingdom	Episode: "Jaszczurze oko" (no. 565)	
2021	The Lousy World	Taper Nowak	Episode: "Młoda kanapa" (no. 567)	
2022	The Lousy World	Professor Ociepko	Episode: "Tajemnica Arnolda Boczka" (no. 583)	
2022	The Lousy World	Professor Masa Kasy	Episode: "Święta kluska" (no. 585)	
2003	Zaginiona	Igor Kryński	Main role	
2003	Na dobre i na złe	Andrzej, Anna's husband	Episode: "Zamknięta wrażliwość" (no. 149)	
2017	Na dobre i na złe	Florian	Episode: "Wstydliwe tajemnice" (no. 684)	
2003	Na Wspólnej	Davric International chairperson	Episodes no. 29–30	
2003–2007	Na Wspólnej	Piotr Szymczak	Recurring role	
2004	Fala zbrodni	Leon Jastrzębski	Episode: "Bitwa" (no. 13)	
2004	Kryminalni	Zbigniew Kawecki	Episode: "Gdzie jest Maciek" (no. 9)	
2005	Timewatch	Lavrentiy Beria	Episode: "Who Killed Stalin?" (no. 50)	
2009–2010	Pierwsza miłość	Mieczyslaw Bogucki		
2005	Biuro kryminalne	Teodor Wysocki	Episode no. 2	
2005–2008	Egzamin z życia	Karol Chełmicki	65 episodes	
2006	Fałszerze. Powrót Sfory	Leman	Episodes no. 4, 7, 11, 12, 14	
2006	Mrok	Kazimierz Gajda	Episode: "Być czy mieć" (no. 2)	
2007	Odwróceni	Tadeusz Feliniak	8 episodes	
2008	Agentki	Artur Muzyka, Joanna's father		
2008	Doręczyciel	Maks	Episodes: "Boogie" (no. 5), "Reklama" (no. 6)	
2008–2009	Foster Family	Włodzimierz Kercz, Michał's father	12 episodes	
2009	Ranczo	Gufi	Episode: "W samo popołudnie" (no. 47)	
2009	World War II Behind Closed Doors: Stalin, the Nazis and the West	Lavrentiy Beria		
2009	Naznaczony	Pathologist	Episode: "Wyścig z czasem" (no. 10)	
2009	Rajskie klimaty	Rosak		
2011	Usta usta	Foreigners Affairs Office employee	Episodes no. 31–32	
2011	Licencja na wychowanie	Wiesław Kowalik	Episode: "Wszyscy i tak skończymy w (d)zupie" (no. 83)	
2012	Siła wyższa	Tashi Ga		
2012	Father Matthew	Maciej Tolak	Episode: "Obrączka" (no. 108)	
2017	Father Matthew	Museum director	Episode: "Sarkofag" (no. 216)	
2014	Na krawędzi 2	Waxman		
2016	Druga szansa	Monika's lawyer	Episodes: "180 stopni" (no. 1), "Wyjście awaryjne" (no. 3)	
2016	Druga szansa	Lawyer	Episodes: "Terapia" (no. 15), "Nadzieja" (no. 16)	
2016	Artyści	Jerzy "Nestor"	Main role	
2018	The Chairman's Ear	Jan Maria	Episode: "Jak żyć (bez polityki)" (no. 33)	
2018	Młody Piłsudski	Staniewski	Episodes: Pilot, 2	
2018	1983	Gustaw Zioła	Episodes: "Rollback" (no. 2), "Subversion" (no. 6)	
2019–2020	A Polish Family	Jan, Magda's father	24 episodes	
2020	The Elements of Sasza – Fire	Leon Ziębiński	4 episodes	
2021	Pajęczyna	Wojciech Jaruzelski	3 episodes	
2021	Kuchnia	Health inspector	Episode no. 6	
2021	Kowalscy kontra Kowalscy	Therapist	Episodes: "O krok za daleko" (no. 13), "Stracona szansa" (no. 27)	
2023–present	Servant of the People	Cezary Kujawa	Main role	
2023	My Agent	Janusz Rymarz	Episode: "Odcinek 12" (no. 12)	

== Awards ==
- Gold Cross of Merit (5 July 2004)
