= Robert Mazurkiewicz =

Polish actor (born 1954)

- Born: 26 April 1954 (age 71)
- Education: Aleksander Zelwerowicz National Academy of Dramatic Art
- Occupation: Actor
- Years active: 1979–present

Robert Mazurkiewicz (Polish: [ma.zurˈkjɛ.vit͡ʂ]; born 26 April 1954) is a Polish stage, film, and television actor.

== Biography ==
Robert Mazurkiewicz was born on 26 April 1954. In 1982, he has graduated from the Aleksander Zelwerowicz National Academy of Dramatic Art in Warsaw, Poland. He performed in the Wanda Siemaszkowa Theatre in Rzeszów from 1979 and 1985, and in the Stefan Żeromski Theater in Kielce from 1985 to 1988. In 1979, he had his cinematic debut as an extra in a war drama film Lesson of a Dead Language. He had multiple secondary and background roles in films such as Pope John Paul II (2005), Death of Captain Pilecki (2006), Ryś (2007), Little Moscow (2008), General Nil (2009), Essential Killing (2010), Letters to Santa 4 (2020), and Screw Mickiewicz (2024), as well as in television series such as Na dobre i na złe (2003, 2023), Plebania (2004–2005, 2010), Crime Detectives (2005), L for Love (2005), The Determinator (2007), War and Peace (2007), Samo życie (2009), The Blonde (2009–2018), 1920. War and Love (2010), Father Matthew (2010, 2022–2023), Na Wspólnej (2011, 2020), The Clan (2013–2014, 2019–2021), Komisarz Alex (2014, 2022), Przypadki Cezarego P. (2015), The Chairman's Ear (2018), The Crown of the Kings (2018, 2020), Friends (2019), The Forest House (2019, 2022), Conspirators (2019), Diagnosis (2018–2019), First Love (2021), and Na sygnale (2022–2024).

In 2016, he portrayer main character of a grandfather in Christmas-themed commercial of an online retail site Allegro, titled Czego szukasz w Święta? English for beginners. It gained huge popularity both domesticly and internationally, and was covered by news outlets such as BBC News, The Daily Telegraph, The Guardian, HuffPost, NBC News, and USA Today. He reprised this role in a 2025 interactive film Allegroverse 25: Legenda Allegrowicza.

== Filmography ==
=== Films ===
Year	Title	Role	Notes
1979	Lesson of a Dead Language		Feature film; uncredited
1982	Most	Janek	Television play
1986	Kino obyczajowe		Television film
2005	Pope John Paul II	Karol Wojtyła (senior)	Television film
2006	Death of Captain Pilecki	Makary Sieradzki	Feature film
2007	Ryś	General Minerał	Feature film
2007	Wednesday, Thursday Morning	Ticket inspector	Feature film
2008	Little Moscow	Head of jury	Feature film
2009	Copernicus's Star		Feature film; voice
2009	General Nil	Polish exile to Siberia	Feature film
2009	Within the Whirlwind	Man in Moscow	Feature film
2010	Essential Killing	Hunter	Feature film
2011	Heritage	Veterinarian	Feature film
2018	Julius	Dog owner	Feature film
2018	Love is Everything	Actor at Szwarc's funeral	Feature film; uncredited
2018	Miasto nad Łyną	Kłobuk	Short film; voice
2020	Letters to Santa 4	Elderly man	Feature film
2023	Pilotka	Zbigniew	Short film
2024	Screw Mickiewicz	Teacher	Feature film
2024	Justice	Janitor in an orphanage	Feature film
2025	Allegroverse 25: Legenda Allegrowicza	Grandfather	Interactive film
2025	Putin		Feature film

=== Television series ===
Year	Title	Role	Notes
2003	Na dobre i na złe	Patient	Episode: "Po drugiej stronie życia" (no. 133); uncredited
2004–2005	Plebania	Brzeziny resident	4 episodes
2005	Crime Detectives	Jan Pawłowski	Episode: "Fotel biskupa" (no. 19)
2005	L for Love	Patient	Episode no. 365
2006–2010	Errata do biografii	Narrator	Voice; 11 episodes
2007	The Determinator	Cecot	6 episodes
2007	War and Peace	Marshal Davout	Miniseries
2008	Little Moscow	Head of jury	Miniseries; episode no. 1
2008	Trzeci oficer	Guard in the Palace of Culture and Science	Episode: "Mechanizm zegarowy" (no. 12)
2009	Samo życie	Neurologist	Episode no. 1330
2009–2018	The Blonde	Błażej Palimąka	16 episodes
2010	1920. War and Love	Dr. Górski	Episode: "Do broni" (no. 9)
2010	Father Matthew	Photographer	Episode: "Lot" (no. 49); uncredited
2010	Plebania	Nawrocki	3 episodes
2011	Na Wspólnej	Patient	3 episodes
2013–2014	The Clan	Hotel owner	2 episodes
2014	The Border	Doorman	Episode no. 2
2014	Komisarz Alex	Veterinarian	Episode: "Koń wart miliony" (no. 77)
2015	Firefighters	Head of the disciplinary board	Episode no. 10
2015	Przypadki Cezarego P.	Priest	Episode: "Ksiądz" (no. 10)
2017	Lekarze na start	Jan Nowak's friend	Episode no. 39
2018	The Chairman's Ear	Jean-Claude	Episode: "Crocodile's Teeth" (no. 31)
2018	The Crown of the Kings	Bohemian scibe	6 episodes
2018	Friends	Physician	Episode no. 146
2018	The Forest House	Dr. Lis	2 episodes
2018–2019	Diagnosis	Judge	2 episodes
2019	Conspirators	Pliszko	Episode no. 5
2019	The Crown of the Kings	Priest from Vienna	4 episodes
2019	Na Wspólnej	Mirosław Zdybicki	Episode no. 2869
2019–2021	The Clan	Henryk Stróżewski	17 episodes
2021	First Love	Tadeusz Nytko	6 episodes
2021	The Mire	Neighbour from Wałbrzych	Episode no. 11
2022	Angel of Death	Neighbour	Episode no. 20
2022	The Forest House	Dr. Stanisław Denkowski	2 episodes
2022	Komisarz Alex	Piotr Szostak	Episode: "Stary znajomy" (no. 228)
2022–2024	Na sygnale	Stefan	2 episodes
2023	Father Matthew	Dog owner	Episode: "Zimna fuzja" (no. 374)
2023	Na dobre i na złe	Olek	Episode: "Obietnica" (no. 873)
2023–2024	Na dobre i na złe	Kiszka Potocki	2 episodes
2024	The Green Glove Gang	Shopping centre security guard	2 episodes
