= Hanna Konarowska =

Polish actress (born 1983)

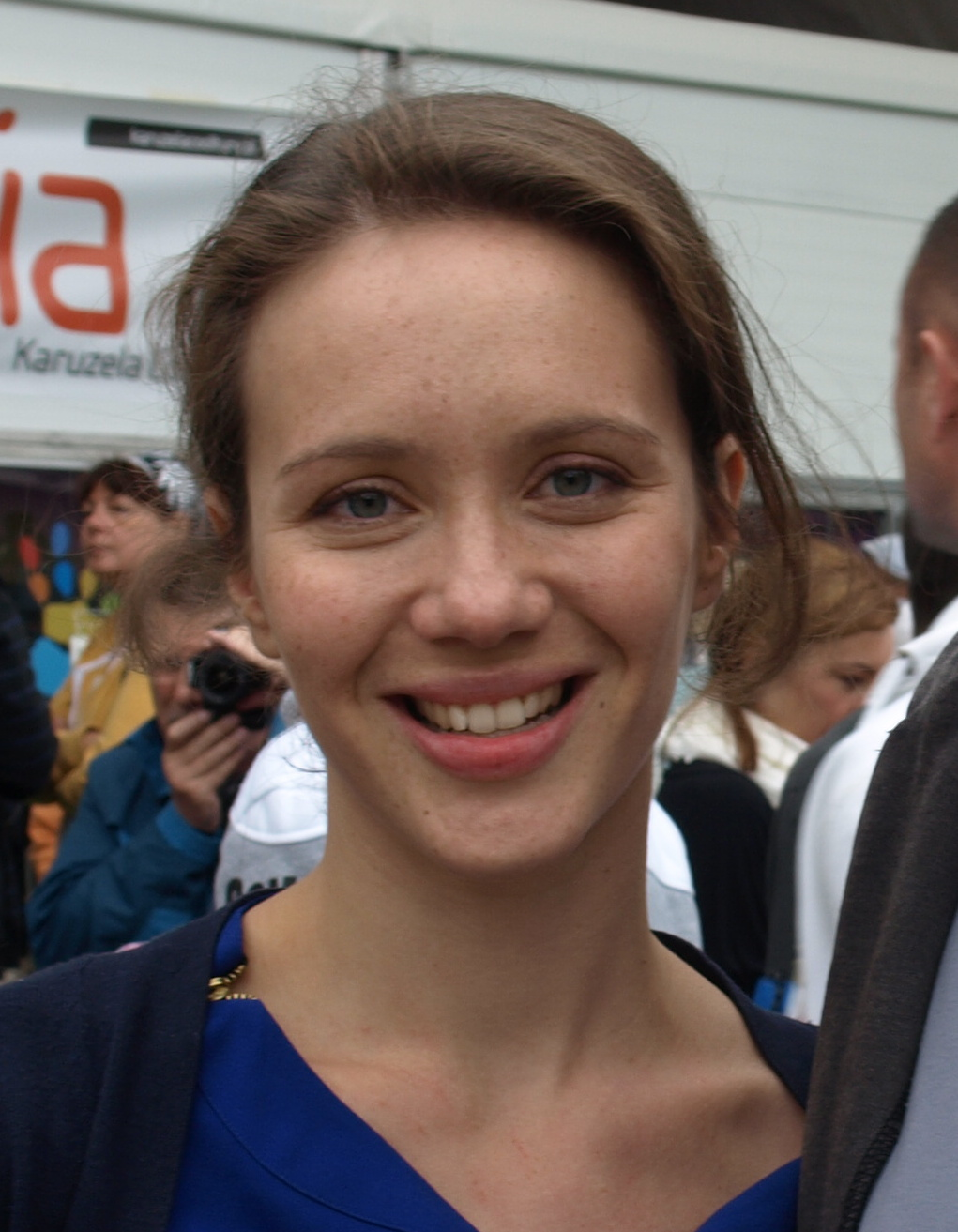
- Konarowska in 2012.
- Born: Hanna Konarowska; 24 May 1983 (age 42); Warsaw, Poland
- Education: Lee Strasberg Theatre and Film Institute
- Occupation: Actress
- Years active: 2002 – present
- Spouses: Jakub Wons (m. 2008; div. 2018); Łukasz Nowiński (m. 2021)
- Children: 3
- Relatives: Mirosław Konarowski (father); Joanna Szczepkowska (mother); Maria Konarowska (sister)

Hanna Konarowska-Nowińska (Note: Polish pronunciation: [ˈxan.na kɔ.naˈrɔf.ska nɔˈviɲ.ska]) (born 24 May 1983) is a Polish stage, television, film, and voice actress. She is best known for her television roles of Albina Węgrzyk in Barwy szczęścia (2019), Kasia Jeżewska in Planet Single: Eight Stories (2021), Elka in L for Love (2023–2024), and Alicja Halicka in Servant of the People (2023–2024).

== Biography ==
Hanna Konarowska was born on 24 May 1983 in Warsaw, Poland. She is the daughter of actors Mirosław Konarowski and Joanna Szczepkowska, and sister of actress Maria Konarowska. Her grandfather was actor Andrzej Szczepkowski, and her great-grandfather writer Jan Parandowski. In 2006, Konarowska graduated from the Lee Strasberg Theatre and Film Institute in New York City, United States.

Konarowska first appeared on television in 2002, with a small role in the series Na dobre i na złe. In the following years, she also had roles in Kosmici (2004), Na Wspólnej (2004–2005), Tango z aniołem (2005–2006), Pitbull (2006), Father Matthew (2010, 2017), L for Love (2012), Friends (2014), DNA (2019), The Defence (2020), and I'll Be Fine (2020). Her notable roles include Renata in Pitbull (2008), Zuzanna in Trzecia połowa (2018), Albina Węgrzyk in Barwy szczęścia (2019), Kasia Jeżewska in Planet Single: Eight Stories (2021), Elka in L for Love (2023–2024), and Alicja Halicka in Servant of the People (2023–2024). She also appeared in films such as Czarny (2008), Ladies (2008), Million Dollars (2010), and Nad życie (2012). Konarowska also had numerous roles on stage, in numerous theatre venues in Warsaw, such as Polonia, 2. Strefa, IMKA, and Kamienica. She is also a voice actress, most notably portraying Cat Valentine in the Polish-language dubbing of Victorious (2010–2013), and Sam & Cat (2013–2014).

== Private life ==
From 2008 to 2018, she was married to actor Jakub Wons, with whom she had a daughter, born in 2011. Her second daughter was born in 2018. In 2021, she married actor Łukasz Nowiński, with whom she has a son, born in 2022.

== Filmography ==
=== Films ===
Year	Title	Role	Notes
2007	Gra	Tennis player	Short film
2007	Scherzo		Short film
2008	Czarny	Gosia	Feature film
2008	Ladies	Maria	Feature film
2010	Million Dollars	Matylda	Feature film
2011	Leśne Doły	Monika	Feature film
2012	Nad życie	Basia	Feature film
2014	Citizen	Nurse on strike	Feature film
2015	Wata cukrowa	Greta	Short film
2015	Wkręceni 2	Nurse	Feature film
2017	Gardenia	Woman #4	Television play
2017	PolandJa	Szymon's wife	Feature film; voice
2018	Tamtej nocy	Zuzanna Szwarc	Short film
2020	Zieja	Conspirator	Feature film
2024	ADHD i inne cudowne zjawiska – wykład nieprzewidywalny	Bride	Television play

=== Television series ===
Year	Title	Role	Notes
2002	Na dobre i na złe	Izabela	Episode: "Lekarski debiut"
2003	Ludzie wśród ludzi		Episode: "Chesz to pij – Alicja"
2004	Kosmici	Beata Majewska	Miniseries; main role; 3 episodes
2004–2005	Na Wspólnej	Klaudia Wiaderna	2 episodes
2005	Crime Detectives	Kuna's daughter	Episode: "Gorzki weekend"
2005–2006	Tango z aniołem	Zuzanna Wojnar	
2006	Oficerowie	Nun	2 episodes
2008	Pitbull	Renata	Recurring role; 12 episodes
2010	Father Matthew	Sylwia Orska	Episode: "Śmierć na żywo"
2011	Na dobre i na złe	Joanna Bień	Episode: "Zaginięcie Agaty"
2012	L for Love	Wioletta	3 episodes
2012	Paradoks	Sylwia	Episode: "Paradoks"
2012	Piąty Stadion	Anna's friend	Episode: "Napad"
2014	Friends	Agnieszka	3 episodes
2014	Lekarze nocą	Intern	Episode no. 3
2016	Druga szansa	Pregnant plane passenger	Episode: "Daleko, blisko"
2016	Dwoje we troje	Anna	2 episodes
2016	Komisarz Alex	Bożena Bogusz	Episode: "Sława ze wszelką cene"
2017	Father Matthew	Alicja Miller	Episode: "Gwiazdor"
2018	Trzecia połowa	Zuzanna	Recurring role; 13 episodes
2019	Barwy szczęścia	Albina Węgrzyk	6 episodes
2019	The Better Half	Zuzanna	Episode no. 4
2019	DNA	Paulina Kalinowska	2 episodes
2020	The Defence	Receptionist	5 episodes
2020	I'll Be Fine	Natalia	5 episodes
2021	Komisarz Mama	Natalia Wołowiec	Episode no. 1
2021	Planet Single: Eight Stories	Kasia Jeżewska	Episode: "Grzesznica"
2022	Zieja	Conspirator	Episode: "Trzeba wybaczyć"
2023	Lokatorka	Zofia	2 episodes
2023–2024	L for Love	Elka	10 episodes
2023–2024	Servant of the People	Alicja Halicka	Main role; 32 episodes
2025	Glina. Nowy rozdział	Psychologist	Episode no. 4

=== Radio dramas ===
Year	Title	Role
2012	Marlon Story	Girl #1

=== Polish-language dubbing ===
Year	Title	Role	Notes
2010–2013	Victorious	Cat Valentine	Television series; 58 episodes
2011	iCarly	Cat Valentine	Television series; episode: "iParty with Victorious"
2013	The Jadagrace Show	Heidi Ham	Television series; 4 episodes; original aired in 2012
2013–2014	Sam & Cat	Cat Valentine	Television series; 36 episodes
2014	Swindle	Amanda Benson	Television film; original aired in 2013
2019–2021	Butterbean's Café	Dalia	Television series; 60 episodes; original aired in 2018–2020
