= Marcin Hycnar =

Polish actor (born 1983)

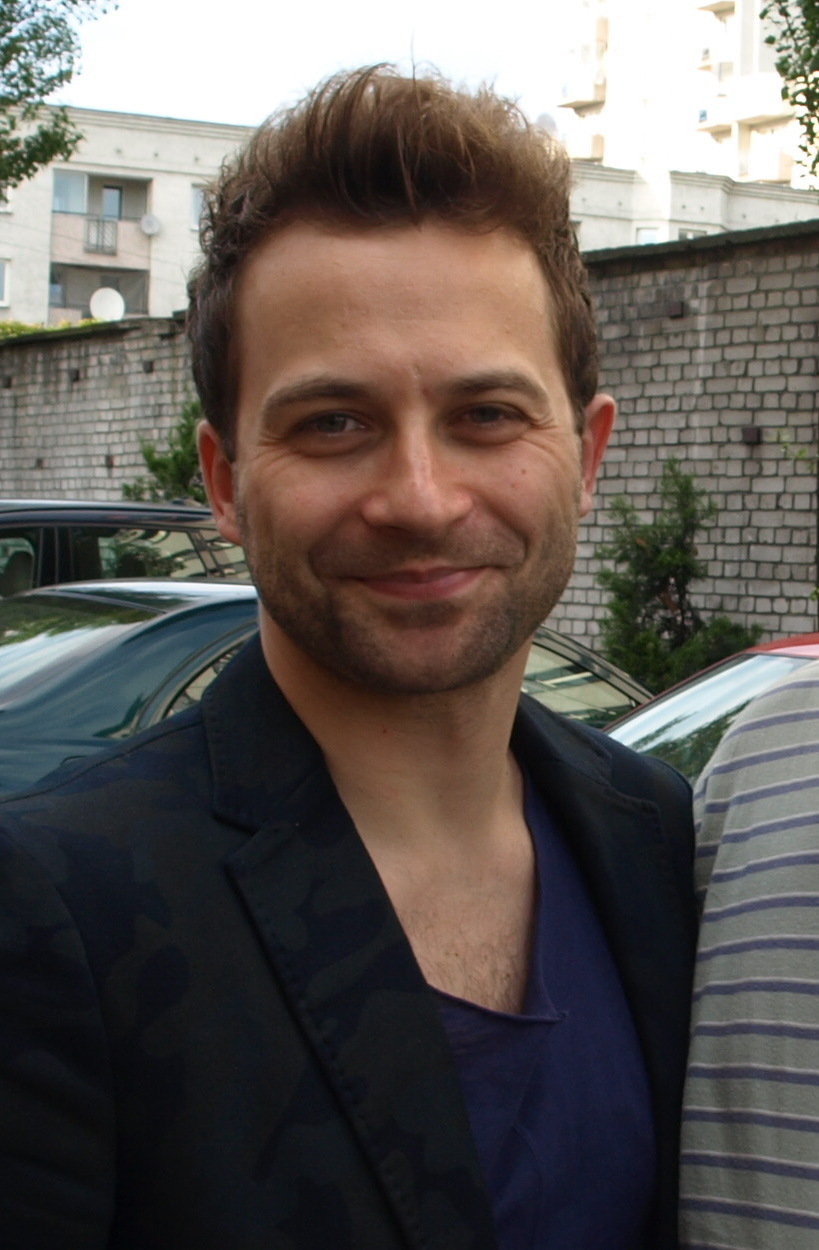
- Marcin Hycnar in 2014.
- Born: 18 January 1983 (age 43); Tarnów, Poland
- Education: Aleksander Zelwerowicz National Academy of Dramatic Art; SGH Warsaw School of Economics
- Occupations: Actor; Director; Cultural manager
- Years active: 2002–present
- Spouse: Kamila Boruta (m. 2011; div. 2017)

Marcin Hycnar (Polish: [ˈmar.t͡ɕin ˈxɘ̟t͡s.nar]; born 18 January 1983) is a stage, television, film, and voice actor, play director, and cultural manager.

== Biography ==
Marcin Hycnar was born on 18 January 1983 in Tarnów, Poland, where he grew up. His mother was a physician, and his father, was the owner of a photography studio. He has two younger siblings: a sister, and a brother, Jędrzej Hycnar, who is also an actor.

He studied acting in 2006, and directing in 2016, at the Aleksander Zelwerowicz National Academy of Dramatic Art in Warsaw, Poland. He is a lecturer of acting at this university. He also graduated the cultural management at the SGH Warsaw School of Economics.

His acting debut was in 2002, in the Ludwik Solski Theatre in Tarnów. From 2006 to 2016, he was a member of the National Theatre in Warsaw. From 2017 to 2020, he was an art director of the Ludwik Solski Theatre, and from 2020 to 2020, a director of the Stefan Jaracz Theatre in Łódź.

== Personal life ==
From 2011 to 2017 he was married to actress Kamila Boruta.

== Filmography ==
=== Films ===
Year	Title	Role	Notes	Ref.
2004	Pamiętnik z Powstania Warszawskiego		Television play	
2004	Od dziś będziemy dobrzy	Żelazko	Television play	
2004	Do potomnego		Documentary film	
2006	Pieniądze i przyjaciele	Martin	Television play	
2006	Kosmos	Fuks	Television play	
2007	Dobrze	Grandson	Television play	
2007	Louise's Garden	Marian		
2007	Pan Much		Short film	
2008	Kryptonim Gracz	Young Jerzy Pawłowski	Television play	
2009	Drzazgi	Bartek		
2011	George the Hedgehog	Krzyś	Voice	
2012	Tango	Artur	Television play	
2013	Rzecz o banalności miłości	Michael Ben Szaked	Television play	
2013	Being Like Deyna	Kazik's voice (narrator)	Voice	
2013	Walesa: Man of Hope	Rysiek		
2017	Volta	Xawery Teysseire		
2017	Śluby panieńskie	Gustaw	Television play	
2017	Mrok	Marek	Television play	
2017	Horace Vernet "Bitwa pod Somosierrą"	Napoleon	Documentary film	
2018	Pożegnania	Paweł	Television play	
2018	Fryderyk	Adam Mickiewicz	Television play	
2019	Piłsudski	Witold Jodko-Narkiewicz		
2019	Supernova	Adam Nowak		
2019	Solid Gold	Maks		
2022	The Perfect Number	Kidnapper		

=== Television series ===
Year	Title	Role	Notes	Ref.
2005	Na dobre i na złe	Emil Wilga	Episode: "Oskarżony" (no. 219)	
2005	Boża podszewka II	Herd's friend	3 episodes	
2006	Daleko od noszy	Operating room assistant	Episode: "Największy przyjacieł człowieka" (no. 80)	
2007–2015:	Barwy szczęścia	Paweł Zwoleński	Main role; 257 episodes	
2008	Teraz albo nigdy!	Driver	Uncredited; episode no. 5	
2008	Agentki	Jacek Migdałek	Episode: "Paparazzi czyli naga prawda" (no. 10)	
2013	Days of Honor	Okoń	6 episodes	
2013	Hotel 52	Irek Gorczyński	2 episodes	
2013–2014	True Law	Robert Dębski	7 episodes	
2014	Sama słodycz	Wiktor	12 episodes	
2016	Kacperiada	Father	Voice; 13 episodes	
2016	Kacperiada	Materialist man	Voice; episode: "Takie buty" (no. 3)	
2017	The Chairman's Ear	Michał from the Platform	Episode: "Stork's nest" (no. 25)	
2020	Bez skrupułów	Maks	4 episodes	
2021	Better Half	Commissioner Walc	2 episodes	
2023	Servant of the People	Ignacy Konieczny	Leading role; 24 episodes	
2023	Mój agent	Borys Warecki	Episode no. 10	
