= Career Girl =

Career Girl may refer to:

- Career woman
- Career Girl (1944 film), an American film by Wallace Fox
- Career Girls, a 1997 British and French film by Mike Leigh
- Career Girl (1960 film), an American film featuring June Wilkinson
- Career Girl (2015 film), a Polish film featuring Sebastian Perdek

== See also ==
- Career Girls Murders, a double murder that occurred in New York City, 1963
