= Sebastian Perdek =

Polish actor (b. 1987)

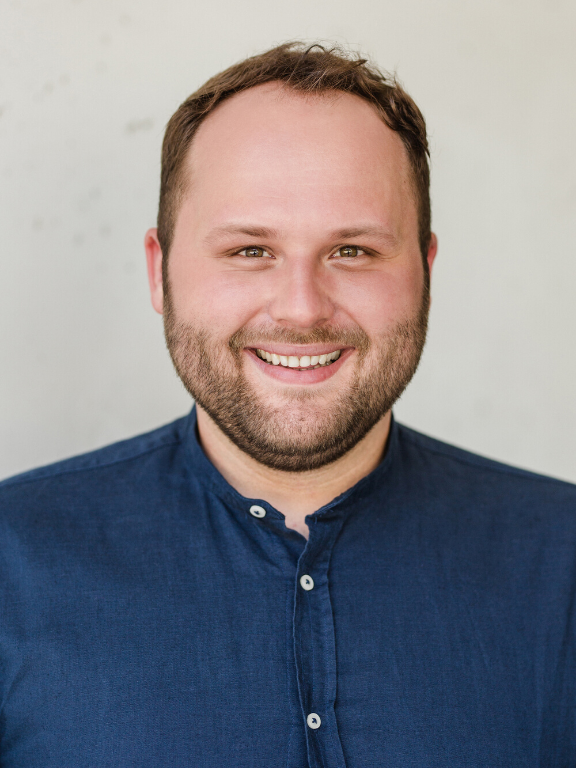
- Sebastian Perdek
- Born: 30 June 1987 (age 39); Bytom, Poland
- Education: National Academy of Theatre Arts in Kraków
- Occupation: Actor
- Years active: 2013–present

Sebastian Perdek (Polish: [sɛˈbas.tjan ˈpɛr.dɛk]; born 30 June 1987) is a film, television and stage actor.

== Biography ==
Sebastian Perdek was born on 30 July 1987 in Bytom, Poland.

He began acting in television series in 2013. In 2014, he had his stage debut in the Aleksander Fredro Theatre in Gniezno, Poland.

In 2016, he graduated from the Wrocław branch of the Kraków National Academy of Theatre Arts, with a degree in acting.

== Filmography ==
=== Film ===
Year	Title	Role	Notes	Ref.
2013	Olena	Police officer	Short film	
2013	Kołysanka	Father	Short film	
2015	Career Girl	Nurse		
2015	Letters to Santa 2	Person in an angel costiume		
2016	Kochaj!	Artur		
2017	A Heart Of Love	Kebab vendor		
2017	PolandJa	Man with a wedding dress		
2017	Gotowi na wszystko. Exterminator	Drummer		
2017	Ksiądz	Police officer	Short film	
2017	Dregs	Fortune-teller Rafał	Short film	
2018	Love is Everything	Norbert		
2018	Clergy	Sergeant Madecki		
2018	The Atlas	Nurse	Short film	
2019	Klify namiętności	Alfred	Short film	
2020	Zieja	Chancellor		
2021	Squared Love	Przemek Matysiak		
2021	Warning	Paweł		
2021	The In-Laws	Cook		
2021	Stancja	Melchior	Short film	
2021	How I Fell in Love with a Gangster	German border guard		
2021	Other People	Mateusz Myta		
2022	Dad			
2022	Święta inaczej	Young father		
2022	Alpha Male	A. Schmidt		
2022	Czy wiesz, kto mieszka pod ósemką	Jacek	Television play	
2023	Ślub doskonały	Rock star aganet		
2023	Horror Story	Seweryn		

=== Television ===
Year	Title	Role	Notes	Ref.
2013	True Law	Sylwek	Episode no. 42	
2013	2XL	Man	Episode no. 7	
2013	Komisarz Alex	Fitter	Episode: "Miasto w strachu" (no. 37)	
2020	Komisarz Alex	Waiter	Episode: "Nadchodzi zemsta" (no. 174)	
2023	Komisarz Alex	Oskar Różycki	Episode: "Maska śmierci" (no. 246)	
2014	Friends	Store client	Episode no. 47	
2014	Baron24	Johnny Silence's agent	Episode: "Święto kina" (no. 14)	
2014–2023	Barwy szczęścia	Klemens Górecki	Recurring role; 160 episodes	
2015	Firefighters	Jakub	Episode no. 7	
2015	Mąż czy nie mąż	Frantisek Ruzicka	Episode: "Mężczyzna w opałach" (no. 11)	
2015	Singielka	Police officer	Episode no. 18	
2015	I'll Be Fine	Delivery person	Episode no. 35	
2017–2018	I'll Be Fine	Przemek	3 episodes	
2016	The Ranch	Client	Episode: "Kto tu rządzi" (no. 118)	
2016	Na dobre i na złe	Waldek	Episode no. 623	
2016	Second Chance. What Matters Most?	Bartender	Episode: "Nagranie" (no. 10)	
2016	The Teacher	Albert	Episode no. 4	
2016	First Love	Jan "Chudy" Wesołowski	2 episodes	
2020	First Love	Wojciech Czajka	6 episodes	
2016	Father Matthew	Staszek Bronisz	Episode: "Porzeczki" (no. 208)	
2021	Father Matthew	Zbigniew Gołąb	Episode: "Warszawski adres" (no. 342)	
2017	Girls From Ukraine	Cook's helper	2 episodes	
2018	Diagnosis	Konrad's friend	2 episodes	
2018–2019	The Crown of the Kings	Dobiesław, Katarzyna's servant	13 episodes	
2020	The Crown of the Kings	Jean le Maingre's squire		
2019	Chasing Dreams	Veterinarian	Episode no. 14	
2019	W rytmie serca	Police officer	Episode: "Ukryte" (no. 49)	
2019	The Trap	Prison chaplain	Episode no. 8	
2019	Insiders. Dads and Daughters	Vendor	Episode no. 6	
2019	Under the Surface	School guard	Episode no. 8	
2019	Heartbeat	Patryk	Episode no. 9	
2019	39 and Half Weeks	Gruby	Episode no. 6	
2019	Żmijowisko	Fashion designer	Episode no. 1	
2020	Miasto Długów	Dariusz	Episode: "Gracze" (no. 30)	
2020	Rysa	Janek	4 episodes	
2020	People and Gods	Stanisław Rzeszot	Episode: "Duet" (no. 1)	
2020	The King of Warsaw	Nationalist student	Episode: "Part 3" (no. 3)	
2020, 2023	The Archivist	Karol Maszek	10 episodes	
2020–2022	Święty	Hubert	21 episodes	
2021	Układ	Janek	2 episodes	
2021	Komisarz Mama	Bernard Kutrzeba	Episode no. 5	
2022	Mental	Police officer	2 episodes	
2022	Zieja	Chancellor	Episode: "Trzeba wybaczać" (no. 2)	
2022	Hold Tight	Marek	4 episodes	
2022	Powrót	Strange bakery customer	Episode no. 4	
2023	Swaci	Person in a hospital	2 episodes	
2023	Servant of the People	Grzegorz Jarosz	11 episodes	
2023	Krew	Kamil Zarębski	3 episodes	
2023	Infamy	Coffin vendor	Episode no. 5	
