= Okil Khamidov =

Film and television director, producer and screenwriter

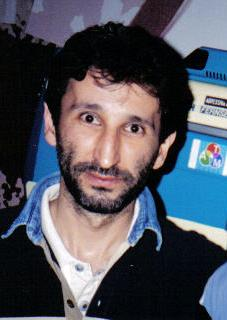
- Okil Khamidov in 2007.
- Born: 6 September 1961 (age 64); Dushanbe, Tajik SSR, Soviet Union (now part of Tajikistan)
- Education: Gerasimov Institute of Cinematography
- Occupations: Television and film director, producer, and screenwriter
- Years active: 1984–present

Okil Khamidov (Tajik: Оқил Ҳамидов; born 6 October 1961), also known as Okił Khamidow, and Okił Chamidow, is a film and television director, producer and screenwriter. He owns the Polot Media filmmaking company. He is best known for his work on television series The Lousy World (1999–2008), Crime Wave (2003–2004), First Love (2004–2007), Ślad (2018–2020), Kowalscy kontra Kowalscy (2021–2022), Kuchnia (2021–2022), and Servant of the People (2023–2024).

== Biography ==
Okil Khamidov was born on 6 October 1962, in Dushanbe, Tajik SSR, Soviet Union (now part of Tajikistan).

He came from a filmmaking family. His father, Obid Khamidov, was the boss of film studio Tajikfilm. Okil has two brothers; Olim who is a film studies expert, and Tolib, who is a film director. As a child, Okil worked as an extra in film productions, and a voice actor in Tajik-language dubbing productions.

In 1984, he graduated in cinematography from the Gerasimov Institute of Cinematography in Moscow. From 1984 to 1994 he was the cinematographer on 14 feature films, and several documentary films made in Tajikistan.

In 1994, he moved to Wrocław, Poland, where he began working in the technical support of the production of the TVP Polonia programme Pałer. Later, he became camera operator and producer in Wrocław-based television station TeDe. From 1997 to 2003, he co-created Polsat television series Telewizyjne Biuro Śledcze, including being the camera operator, screenwriter, and director. At the time, he also worked as a vendor of cooking books.

Later, he directed Polsat television series The Lousy World (1999–2008), Crime Wave (2003–2004), and First Love (2004–2008). He also co-created reality shows Dwa światy (2001) and Bar (2002), and game shows Życiowa szansa (2000), Cash Battle (2005), and Clueless (2005). In 2003, he was granted Polish citizenship.

In 2008, he created filmmaking company TAKO Media, which was renamed to Polot Media in 2021. In 2008, he and his company created Yaka to melodiya? (Ukrainian: Яка то мелодія?), a Ukrainian-language version of Polish-language game show Jaka to melodia?. His company also created multiple Polsat paradocumentary television series, such as Dlaczego ja? (2010–present), Trudne sprawy (2011–present), and Na ratunek 112 (2016–present), which he also directed.

In 2021, he wrote and directed Polsat comedy television series Kowalscy kontra Kowalscy, and Kuchnia, which were based on Russian-made television series The Ivanovs vs. The Ivanovs, and Kitchen, respectively. In 2022, he has written and directed comedy television series Servant of the People, which was based on the 2015 Ukrainian-made television series of the same name.

== Filmography ==
=== Film production ===
Year	Title	Position	Notes
2004	Yagnob	Cinematographer	Documentary film
2019	Jestem M. Misfit	Producer	Feature film

=== Television production ===
Year	Title	Position	Notes
1997–2003	Telewizyjne Biuro Śledcze	Director, screenwriter, cinematographer	
1999–2008	The Lousy World	Director and cinematographer	282 episodes
1999–2008	The Lousy World	Screenwriter	5 episodes
2000–2002	Życiowa szansa	Director	Game show
2001	Dwa światy	Director	Reality show
2001–2002	Zerwane więzi	Director	Talk show
2002	Bar	Director	Reality show
2002–2004	Rosyjska ruletka	Director	Game show
2002–2005	Cash Battle	Director	Game show
2003–2004	Crime Wave	Director, screenwriter, and cinematographer	14 episodes
2004–2007	First Love	Director, cinematographer	671 episodes
2005	Biuro kryminalne	Director, screenwriter, cinematographer	16 episodes
2005–2007	Clueless	Director	Game show
2009	Gra wstępna	Director	Game show
2010–2024	Dlaczego ja?	Director, screenwriter, producer	
2011	Stop Drogówka	Producer	
2011–2013, 2016	Pamiętniki z wakacji	Director, screenwriter, producer	
2011–2024	Trudne sprawy	Director, screenwriter, producer	
2012	Nieprawdopodobne, a jednak	Director, screenwriter	
2013	Sex Doctors	Director	
2013	Czyja wina	Director	
2013–2017, 2020–2024	Zdrady	Director, screenwriter	
2014	Na patrolu	Director	
2014	Zagadki kryminalne	Director	
2015	Poznaj swoje prawa	Director	
2014–2015	Dzień, który zmienił moje życie	Director, producer	
2014–2015	Sekrety sąsiadów	Director	
2015–2017	Detektywi w akcji	Director	
2018–2020	Ślad	Director, producer, screenwriter, cinematographer	
2018–2024	The Beautiful. Wygraj sukces	Director	Game show
2020	Sąsiedzkie porachunki	Producer	
2020–2021	Tatuśkowie	Producer	
2021	Backdoor. Wyjście awaryjne	Producer	
2021	Akademik	Producer	
2021–2022	Komisarz Mama	Producer	
2021–2022	Kowalscy kontra Kowalscy	Director, producer, screenwriter	44 episodes
2021–2022	Kuchnia	Director, producer, screenwriter	40 episodes
2022	Domek na szczęście	Producer	
2022	Lulu	Producer	
2022–2023	Swaci	Producer	
2023	Grzechy sąsiadów	Producer	
2023	Krejzi Patrol	Producer	
2023	Krew	Producer	
2023–2024	Servant of the People	Director, producer, screenwriter	46 episodes

=== Acting ===
Year	Title	Role	Notes
2021	Kowalscy kontra Kowalscy	Tajik language teacher	Episode no. 3
2023	Servant of the People	Film director	Episode no. 8
