= Jakub Zdrójkowski =

Polish television, film and voice actor

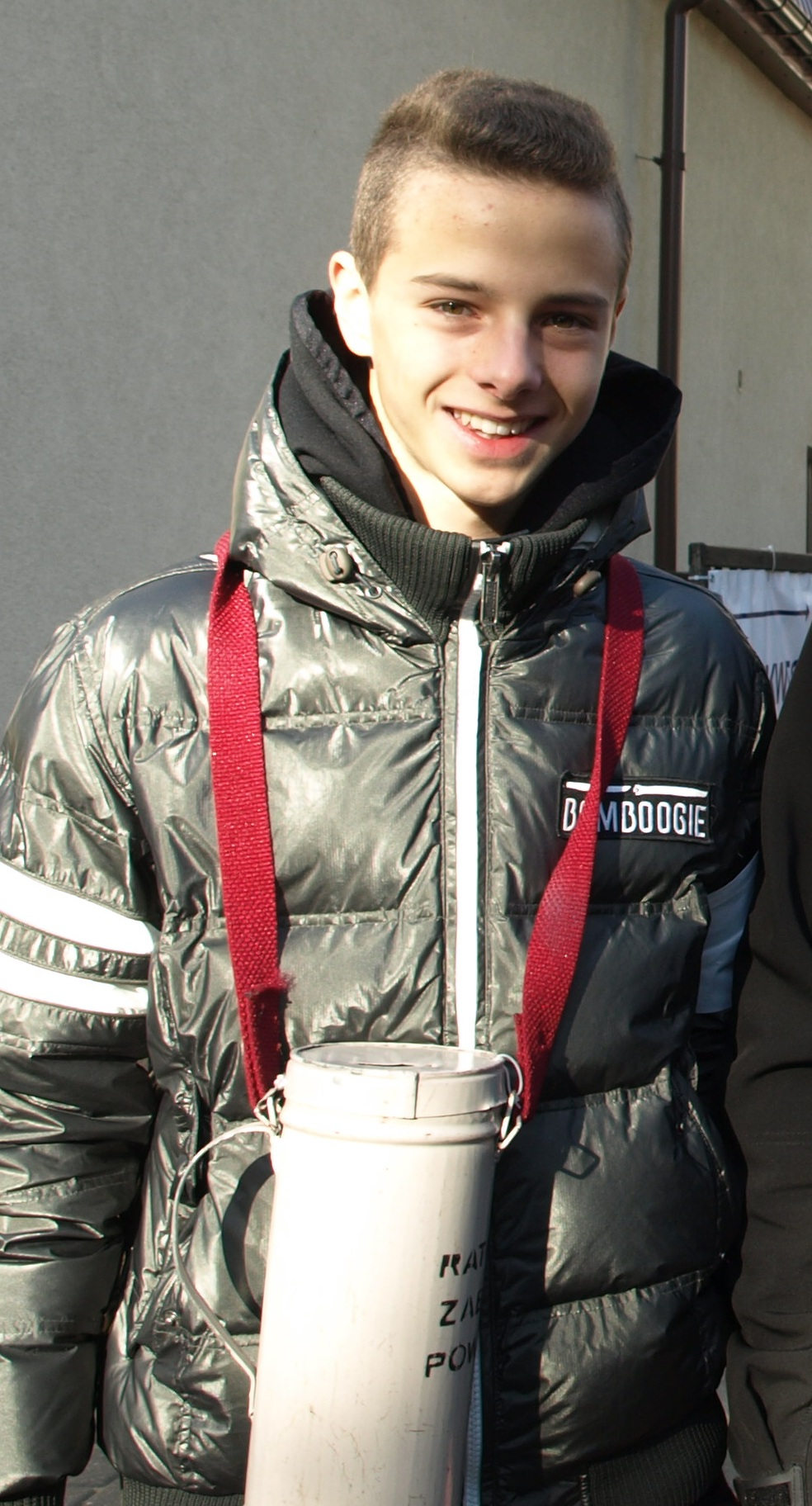
- Jakub Zdrójkowski in 2015.
- Born: 29 May 2000 (age 25); Warsaw, Poland
- Occupation: Actor
- Years active: 2005–present
- Relatives: Adam Zdrójkowski (brother)

Jakub Zdrójkowski (Polish: [ˈja.kup zdrujˈkɔf.ski]; born 29 May 2000) is a television, film, and voice actor. He is best known for portraying Piotr in Foster Family (2009), and Nikodem Kowalski in Kowalscy kontra Kowalscy.

== Biography ==
Jakub Zdrójkowski was born on 29 May 2000, in Warsaw, Poland. He is the son of Dariusz Zdrójkowski and Edyta Zdrójkowska, and has a twin brother Adam Zdrójkowski, who is also an actor.

In 2003, his family participated in the TVN game show Chwila prawdy.

In 2005, he portrayed Kuba Waligóra, a five-year-old child of main characters in the TVN television series Magda M. In 2009, he and his brother, Adam, portrayed twin brothers Piotr and Paweł in the television series Foster Family. The same year they also portrayed twin brothers Matthew and Jimmy in the television series The Londoners. From 2012 to 2014, he was a host of the Teletoon+ children's cooking show Deserownia. He also had various guest roles in television series such as Family.pl (2011), Hotel 52 (2012), Reguły gry (2012), Father Matthew (2013, 2020), and minor roles in films such as Superheroes (2010) and Battery Number One (2015). From 2021 to 2022, he portrayed Nikodem Kowalski, one of the main characters of the Polsat television series Kowalscy kontra Kowalscy. In 2022, he participated in the Polsat talent show Twoja twarz brzmi znajomo.

== Filmography ==
=== Films ===
Year	Title	Role	Notes	Ref.
2010	Superheroes	Gabryś	Feature film	
2012	Being Like Deyna	Altar server	Feature film	
2015	Battery Number One	Andrzej	Feature film	

=== Television series ===
Year	Title	Role	Notes	Ref.
2003	Chwila prawdy	Himself	Game show; 1 episode	
2005	Magda M.	Kuba Waligóra	6 episodes	
2009	Foster Family	Piotr	Main role; 16 episodes	
2009	The Londoners	Matthew	3 episodes	
2011	Family.pl	Kuba's friend	Episode: "Narada rodzinna" (no. 43)	
2012	Reguły gry	Jurek	Episode: "Stary donry grzech" (no. 12)	
2012	Hotel 52	Bartek Konieczny	Episode no. 69	
2012–2014	Deserownia	Himself (host)	Cooking show	
2013	Father Matthew	Boy	Episode: "Układ" (no. 129)	
2020	Father Matthew	Robert Stępień	Episode: "Zamęt" (no. 295)	
2015	Kuba Wojewódzki	Himself (guest)	1 episode	
2020	Barwy szczęścia	Bogdan	7 episodes	
2021–2022	Kowalscy kontra Kowalscy	Nikodem Kowalski	Main role; 44 episodes	
2022	Twoja twarz brzmi znajomo	Himself (contestant)	Talent show	
2023	Camera Café. Nowe parzenie	Delivery person	Episode no. 13	
2023	First Love	Mikołaj, Filip Wenerski's stepbrother	4 episodes	
2023–2024	The Crown of the Kings	Hynek	Recurring role; 28 episodes	
2024	Kings	Hynek		
