= Warning (2021 film) =

2021 film by Agata Alexander

- Theatrical release poster
- Directed by: Agata Alexander
- Written by: Agata Alexander; Rob Michaelson; Jason Kaye
- Produced by: Cybill Lui; Stanislaw Dziedzic
- Starring: Alex Pettyfer; Alice Eve; Annabel Mullion; Annabelle Wallis; Benedict Samuel; Charlotte Le Bon; Garance Marillier; Kylie Bunbury; Patrick Schwarzenegger; Rupert Everett; Sebastian Perdek; Thomas Jane; Tomasz Kot; Toni Garrn; James D’Arcy
- Cinematography: Jakub Kijowski
- Edited by: Nikodem Chabior; Cam Mclauchlin
- Music by: Gregory Tripi
- Production companies: Grindstone Entertainment Group; Anova Pictures; Film Produkcja; Studio Mao; Lost Lane Entertainment; Particular Crowd; Needle's Eye Entertainment
- Distributed by: Lionsgate
- Release date: October 13, 2021 (Sitges)
- Running time: 85 minutes
- Countries: United States; Poland
- Language: English
- Box office: $188,173

Warning is a 2021 science fiction thriller film directed by Agata Alexander in her directorial debut, from a screenplay by Alexander, Jason Kaye and Rob Michaelson. It stars Alex Pettyfer, Alice Eve, Annabelle Wallis, Benedict Samuel, Charlotte Le Bon, Thomas Jane, Patrick Schwarzenegger, Rupert Everett, Tomasz Kot, Kylie Bunbury and Garance Marillier. The film premiered at the 2021 Sitges Film Festival.

== Synopsis ==
"Set in the not-too-distant future, this intense sci-fi thriller explores the repercussions that humanity faces when omniscient technology becomes a substitute for human contact. But life begins to unravel when a meteor shower and a global storm causes electronics to go haywire, leading to terrifying, deadly consequences."

== Cast ==
- Alex Pettyfer as Liam
- Alice Eve as Claire
- Annabel Mullion as Dora
- Annabelle Wallis as Nina
- Benedict Samuel as Vincent
- Charlotte Le Bon as Charlotte
- Garance Marillier as Magda
- Kylie Bunbury as Anna
- Patrick Schwarzenegger as Ben
- Rupert Everett as Charlie
- Sebastian Perdek as Pawel
- Thomas Jane as David
- Tomasz Kot as Brian
- Toni Garrn as Olivia
- Richard Pettyfer as Ron
- James D’Arcy as the voice of God

== Production ==
In September 2018, it was announced James D'Arcy, Laura Harrier, Mena Massoud, Alex Pettyfer, Charlotte Le Bon, Lana Condor and Benedict Samuel would star in the film, with Agata Alexander directing from a screenplay by herself, Jason Kaye and Rob Michaelson. Cybill Lui will produce under her Anova Pictures banner. In October 2018, Alice Eve joined the cast of the film. Unfortunately, Harrier, Massoud and Condor didn't make the cut. In November 2018, Annabelle Wallis joined the cast of the film. In February 2019, Raúl Castillo and Thomas Jane joined the cast of the film. In March 2019, it was announced Patrick Schwarzenegger, Rupert Everett, Tomasz Kot, Kylie Bunbury and Garance Marillier had joined the cast of the film. In April 2019, Toni Garrn, Annabel Mullion and Richard Pettyfer joined the cast of the film.

Principal photography began on March 13, 2019.

== Reception ==
=== Critical response ===
On review aggregator Rotten Tomatoes, Warning holds an approval rating of 30% based on 10 reviews, with an average rating of 4.8/10." On Metacritic, the film holds a score of 53 out of 100, based on 5 critics, indicating "mixed or average reviews".

=== Box office ===
As of April 7, 2024, Warning grossed $188,173 in United Kingdom, Australia, and New Zealand.
