= Justice (2024 film) =

2024 film by Michał Gazda

- Polish Netflix poster
- Polish: Napad
- Directed by: Michał Gazda
- Written by: Bartosz Staszczyszyn
- Produced by: Magdalena Szwedkowicz
- Starring: Olaf Lubaszenko; Jędrzej Hycnar
- Cinematography: Tomasz Augustynek
- Edited by: Piotr Kmiecik
- Production company: MAG Entertainment
- Distributed by: Netflix
- Release date: 16 October 2024
- Running time: 113 minutes
- Country: Poland
- Language: Polish

Justice (Polish: Napad, lit. 'Robbery') is a 2024 Polish crime drama film directed by Michał Gazda, based on the 2001 Warsaw Kredyt Bank robbery. It was released on Netflix on 16 October 2024.

== Cast ==
- Olaf Lubaszenko as Tadeusz Gadacz
- Jędrzej Hycnar as Kacper Surmiak
- Wiktoria Gorodeckaja as Aleksandra Janicka
- Magdalena Boczarska as the prosecutor
- Łukasz Szczepanowski as Bartek Sawczuk
- Stanisław Linowski as Marek Nowak
- Nel Kaczmarek as Monika
- Dariusz Toczek as Drabik
- Mirosław Haniszewski as the minister
- Jowita Budnik as Bartek's mother
- Karol Bernacki as Jacek
- Marcin Czarnik as the police commander
- Krzysztof Dracz as Henryk Szwed
- Szymon Kukla as Emil
- Jakub Kornacki as the caretaker
- Dymitr Hołówko as Marek's grandfather
- Agnieszka Dulęba-Kasza as Celina
- Karolina Staniec as Sylwia
- Weronika Warchoł as Anna
- Michał Grzybowski as Celina's husband
- Adam Nawojczyk as the bank branch manager
- Barbara Tkaczow as Ewa Surmiak
- Jacek Mikołajczak as Madejski
- Anna Krotoska as Anna Lewicka
- Ewa Kaim as the orphanage director
- Robert Mazurkiewicz as the orphanage janitor
- Milena Lisiecka as a caretaker
- Arkadiusz Smoleński as Officer Walczak
- Jeremi Jaworski as Wacek
- Kazik Mazur as Sirocki
- Paulina Komenda as Basia
- Artur Krajewski as the coroner
- Łukasz Matecki as a businessman
- Ireneusz Dydliński as Mieczysław Wielgusz
- Grzegorz Falkowski as Karaś
- Anna Maria Chrostowska as Pańcia
- Piotr Rogucki as a gravedigger
- Adam Szyszkowski as Rysio
- Klara Grzybowska as Madzia
- Sławomir Pacek as a waiter
- Bartłomiej Skowron as Officer Kalski
- Andrzej Kozłowski as an employee

== Release ==
The film was released on Netflix on 16 October 2024.

== Reception ==
Julia Właszczuk of Vogue Polska called the film "competently made, if somewhat predictable" and wrote, "As the action progresses, the film loses momentum, devoting too much attention to attempts to absolve the main characters. Meanwhile, the ending does not bring the desired salvation."
