= Clueless (game show) =

2005 Polish TV game show

- Created by: ATM Grupa
- Directed by: Okił Khamidow
- Starring: Krzysztof Ibisz
- Country of origin: Poland
- Original language: Polish
- No. of episodes: 343

Original release
- Network: Polsat
- Release: 13 April 2005 – June 2007

Clueless (Polish: Gra w ciemno, lit. "Blind Game") was a Polish game show hosted by Krzysztof Ibisz that ran from 2005 to 2007 on Polsat. This game show was known for showing amounts in the contestant's envelopes to the TV viewers (thanks to the on-screen graphics), while not showing those amounts to the contestant until the end of the game.

== Gameplay ==
Each game of Clueless consists of three parts:

=== Part 1: Picks ===
At the start of the game, the contestant picks several envelopes from a pool of 50 - initially they picked 10, then reduced to 8 and 5 in later episodes. Each envelope has a cheque with the smallest amount being 0 zlotys, and the highest being 100,000 zlotys. There are also two special cheques labeled -50% and -100%, which, if taken to the end of the game, reduce the contestant's final winnings by 50% and 100% respectively.

The contents in each envelope is shown to home viewers, while the contestant does not know which envelope contains what amount.

=== Part 2: Questions ===
After picking the envelopes, the contestant is asked a series of multiple-choice questions, one for each envelope they have. The contestant is first shown the question, then chooses an envelope to play for in that question, before 4 possible answers are revealed. If the contestant answers correctly, they get to keep the chosen envelope. If not, they destroy the envelope using a paper shredder. The host may allow the contestant to open the envelope before putting it in the shredder.

=== Part 3: Offers ===
After answering all questions, if the contestant has no envelopes left, the game ends immediately and the contestant leaves with nothing. Otherwise, the host offers an amount of money for one or more envelopes. The contestant can reject the offer; they can also suggest a new offer, but it has to be approved by the host. Once an offer is accepted, the traded envelopes are opened to reveal the amount inside, then destroyed in the same manner as Part 2. The contestant can also choose to open an envelope and immediately claim the amount inside.

=== Conclusion ===
Once all envelopes have been opened, either as part of an offer or for the contestant to keep, the game ends. The contestant wins any money inside the envelope(s) they chose to keep as well as any money won as part of offers; this amount is reduced by 50% or 100% if the contestant chooses to keep the corresponding envelopes.

== International versions ==
Country	Name	Host	Channel	Airdates	Highest envelope value
Czech Republic	Naslepo	Marek Vašut	ČT1	13 January – 19 July 2008	150,000 Kč
Greece	Λεφτά στα τυφλά Lefta sta tyfla	Christos Simardanis and Eleftheria Pantelidaki	Mega Channel	2006–2007	200,000 €
Spain	El negociador	Javier Capitán	La 1	July 2007 – 2008	60,000 €
United Arab Emirates	المفاوض; Almfawd	?	DMI	2010	AED 100,000
Vietnam	Thử tài thách trí	Bình Minh	HTV7	2 October 2011 – 1 February 2016	50,000,000₫

The format was also sold to several other countries (including Italy), where it was ultimately not broadcast. A pilot episode was produced in Ukraine for ICTV, under the name Гра на темно (Gra na temno), with Pavlo Shilko as the host.

== Memorable moments and statistics ==
A woman picked 5 envelopes with 100,000 zl in each one of them, but sold them all for 12,000 zl. The host gave her a reward for that, which was 20,000 zl. In all, she won 32,000 zl. This was the only time somebody picked these envelopes.

The least you could win is 6 zl and 25 gr, having 5 envelopes, a 100 and 4 -50%, and the highest is 500,000, each envelope containing 100,000.
