= DNA (Danish TV series) =

Danish television drama

- Also known as: Kidnapping
- Genre: Drama, police procedural
- Created by: Torleif Hoppe
- Written by: Torleif Hoppe, Nanna Westh
- Directed by: Kasper Gaardsøe; Henrik Ruben Genz; Fabian Wullenweber
- Starring: Anders W. Berthelsen; Zofia Wichlacz; Charlotte Rampling; Olivia Joof Lewerissa; Johanne Louise Schmidt; Sigurd Holmen le Dous
- Original languages: Danish; French; English
- No. of seasons: 2
- No. of episodes: 14

DNA, or Kidnapping, is a Danish television police procedural drama, which was broadcast from 9 September 2019. It was created by Torleif Hoppe, who is the principal scriptwriter with five episodes of season one co-written by Nanna Westh. It was directed by Kasper Gaardsøe and Henrik Ruben Genz (both 2019) and Fabian Wullenweber (2022–2023). The main protagonist, Rolf (Anders W. Berthelsen) is a police officer, he is joined by French-based investigator, Claire (Charlotte Rampling). Season one has Rolf's daughter disappearing during a ferry trip. Five years later, Rolf learns of flaws in the police's DNA database and, while investigating another kidnapping, determines to find his missing daughter. He works with policewoman Neel (Olivia Joof Lewerissa). Meanwhile, action flashes back to five years earlier when unmarried Polish teenager Julita (Zofia Wichlacz) has her daughter, Hania at a convent. Julita's told Hania died, however, Julita trails baby traffickers and recovers an infant girl, who she raises as her own in France. Season two was broadcast from 18 December 2022 with Berthelsen, Wichlacz, Rampling and Lewerissa reprising their roles.

== Plot ==
Season one. Rolf hunts a child, Minna, who's been kidnapped. As his wife, Maria is away in London, Rolf brings his daughter Andrea onto a ferry to travel to a witness in Poland. While on-board, Andrea, is herself kidnapped but fellow police determine she was washed overboard. Earlier, in Poland, young mother Julita had given birth to a daughter, who is stolen by nuns, who claim she died in childbirth. Her child is sold to baby traffickers, Melanie and Oliver, working for adoption agaency Bliss. Julita trails them to Denmark. She sees Rolf collecting Andrea's pram from colleague Jarl and his wife Ewa. On the ferry, Julita grabs Andrea believing she's her daughter, Hania.

Five years later, Neel catches serial rapist-murderer "Tranum Man", however his DNA is not on the police database. Rolf alerts Jarl to the problem. Jarl resolves an undiscovered systemic error. Rolf re-tests samples from Minna's case, which provides DNA link to a recent corpse, Victoria, found in France. Claire joins Rolf, Neel, Jarl and IT specialist, Staahl in re-opening Minna's case. Eventually police discover Bliss has a connection with a youth care centre run by Bror, who also arranges his foster daughters to become surrogate mothers. Melanie's sister Victoria had argued with Oliver about handing over a baby. Oliver claims Victoria was accidentally killed. Melanie recalls that Julita's daughter had died of SIDS, so Oliver kidnapped Minna. Rolf, Claire and team find Minna, who was put up for adoption and reunite her with her mother however it goes poorly as she has no memory of her real mother and doesn’t want to be separated from her adoptive parents.Rolf and Neel discover that Jarl’s wife Eva is secretly the leader of Bliss and it was Jarl himself who caused the systemic error in order to hide her involvement. At the end, Rolf trails Julita to France, where she's raised Hania. He meets them, posing as a fellow school parent. Recalling how badly Minna took it and not wanting the same to happen for Andrea/Hania, Rolf resolves not to separate Julita and Hania.

== Cast and characters ==
- Anders W. Berthelsen as Rolf Larsen: Vestegnen police officer, later posted to North Jutland county. Andrea's father, Maria's husband, later divorced.
- Zofia Wichlacz as Julita Sienko a.k.a. Dorota: Stalowa Wola woman, lives with her grandmother, Tadek's fiancée. Her daughter's kidnapped by nuns, given to Bliss agents, Oliver and Melanie. Raises Hania as her daughter.
- Charlotte Rampling as Claire Bobain: French Judicial Police investigator, works with Rolf on child trafficking network
- Olivia Joof Lewerissa as Neel Skipsted: Hjørring police assistant; reassigned to work with Rolf
- Johanne Louise Schmidt as Maria Larsen: Rolf's wife, Andrea's mother, later divorced. Flight attendant
- Sigurd Holmen le Dous as Staahl: DNA profiler, worked for Jarl.
- Lars Berge as Torstein Bakkemoe: Maria's second husband

=== Season one only ===
- Nicolas Bro as Jarl Skaubo: police DNA profiler, Rebekka and Markus' father. Later heads Forensic Medical Centre.
- Trine Pallesen as Astrid Oxlev: Vestegnen chief superintendent, Rolf's boss
- Louise Mieritz as Eva Skaubo (née Nowak) a.k.a. "Aunt Nova": Jarl's wife, Rebekka and Markus' mother. Familay Affairs agent, Bliss leader
- Dariusz Toczek as Karol Kozlowski: Twaróg municipal policeman, helps Rolf and Claire with baby trafficking case
- Grażyna Zielińska as "Babka" (English: "Grandmother"): Julita's grandma
- Maria Erwolter as Gunvor: Minna's mother, Zaid's ex-wife
- Peter Gilsfort as Bror Randrup: youth care centre manager, Vibeke's husband
- Wojciech Blach as Wladek: Polish policeman, Karol's subordinate
- Jadwiga Jankowska-Cieślak as Prior Apolonia: Mandorla clinic's leader; organises care for pregnant unmarried women
- Anders Heinrichsen as Jannik Vidt: ambitious Vestegnen police officer, Rolf's rival, falsified evidence
- Hanna Dunowska as Renata: Tadek's mother
- Uffe Kristensen as "Tranum mand" (English: "Tranum Man"): serial rapist, murderer. Caught by Neel
- Clara Ellegaard as Melanie: Victoria's older sister, lived at Bror's youth care centre, worked with Oliver, surrogate mother for Bliss
- Frederik Christian Johansen as Oliver Lassen: child kidnapper, worked for Bliss (adoption agency), lived at Bror's youth centre
- Piotr Polk as Piotr Kalinowski: Warsaw resident, adopted Minna as Alicja
- Hanna Konarowska as Paulina Kalinowski: Piotr's wife, adopted Minna
- Quentin Faure as Grégoire Moreau: Parisienne man, Fabien's partner, adopted Victoria's baby
- Samuel Brafman-Moutier as Fabien Moreau: Grégoire's partner, adopted Victoria's baby
- Zuzanna Pulawska as Irenka: Julita's contemporary, pregnant with twins, told they were stillborn

=== Season two only ===
- Mario Montescu as Mario Zaharia: Cluj-born, Nicoleta's younger brother, trafficked to Denmark for Work-Force
- Afshin Firouzi as Hooman Møller: Copenhagen Deputy Chief Superintendent, Rolf's new boss.
- Șerban Pavlu as Lazâr: Work-Force's Romanian-based human trafficker, organised Nicoleta's and Cosma's abductions
- Theodora Sandu as Nicoleta Zaharia: Mario's older sister, trafficked to Denmark, forced into prostitution as "Venus"
- Jens Jørn Spottag as Christian Hoxa: Board of Integration member, Ethnic Minorities in Denmark (EMIDA) treasurer; front for Work-Force human trafficking for prostitution, cheap labour
- Kaja Halse Gramkow as Hania: Julita's presumptive daughter, seven-year-old
- Adrian Anghel as Bebe: operates Work-Force's West Zealand slaughterhouse, buys Mario; Lazâr's henchman
- Carsten Bjørnlund as Frank Krøjer Jensen: former footballer, owns Panacea Baltic, providing migrant workers, subcontracts Work-Force
- Calita Nantu as Lavinia: trafficked to Denmark alongside Mario, met Nicoleta, forced into prostitution
- Ciprian Nicula as Florin: trafficked to Denmark alongside Mario
- Charles Martins as Capitain Alex Dupont: Parisian policeman, assists Rolf and Claire
- Valentin Gheorghe as Cosma a.k.a. "Navigator": Nicoleta's boyfriend, trafficked to Denmark, works for Lazâr
- Eliska Materankova & Dominika Tlatová as Baby Siw: Maria and Lars' daughter
- Jim Latrache-Qvortrup as Alfons Oliver/Pimp: brothel chain owner, buys Nicoleta, Dorina, Livinia forced them into prostitution
- Meda Topirceanu as Dorina: trafficked to Denmark alongside Nicoleta, forced into prostitution
- Sofia Khuong as Pige i Koma (English:"Girl in a Coma")/Lin Nath Hùng: survivor from human trafficking

== Episode guide ==
=== Season one ===
No. overall	No. in season	Title	Directed by	Written by	Original release date
1	1	"Minna" (Minna)	Henrik Ruben Genz	Torleif Hoppe	9 September 2019
Rolf, aboard Baltic Sea ferry, searches for Andrea. He begs captain to stop. Rolf believes Andrea's kidnapped. Three days before: After fishing, Rolf returns to Andrea and Maria. Rolf investigates Minna's kidnapping. Gunvor's separated from Minna's father, Zaid. Police search for Zaid. Minna's clothes scattered near highway. Rolf catches Zaid running from Gunvor's flat. His lawyer alibis Zaid. Rolf publicises Minna's abduction against Astrid's orders: too many irrelevant calls. Kidnapper's DNA's found on cigarette: not registered. Rolf meets Jarl, who has spare pram. Rolf finds Polish cigarette pack near crime scene, which matches kidnapper's DNA. Rolf takes Maria and Andrea to collect Jarl's pram. They meet Eva and stay for dinner. Maria leaves for London conference. Rolf brings Andrea to work. Nanny calls: isolated by storm; cannot mind Andrea. He receives tip from Tworóg, Poland: Minna at petrol station. Rolf informs Jarl: travelling to Tworóg. Jarl joins Rolf, so he can care for Andrea. They take Jarl's car to ferry. Rolf becomes seasick; tries getting Andrea asleep. Leaves pram on deck, rushes to toilet to vomit. When he returns, Andrea's gone. Jarl finds Rolf yelling for Andrea. Ferry docks at Rostock. Rolf begins searching cars, preventing them leaving. He's stopped by security.
2	2	"Tranum Man" (Tranummanden)	Henrik Ruben Genz	Torleif Hoppe	16 September 2019
North Jutland: Maria phones Rolf: five years since Andrea's disappearance. Police determine Andrea washed overboard. Rolf hears stolen car report. Neel checks car's driver for DUI. While checking registration, car drives off. Rolf arrives; stolen car aflame. He meets Neel, who explains driver ran off. Rolf ordered to take driver's breathalyser for DNA testing. Stalowa Wola: Julita asks gynaecologist for abortion. He requires 3000złoty: Julita cannot pay. Copenhagen: Rolf hands sample to Jarl. Jarl: Zaid organised Minna's kidnapping. Neel learns of Andrea's disappearance. She finds B&B keys inside burnt car. In Løkken, Neel discovers surfer Molly's been abducted. Tadek visits Julita; they get engaged. Rolf and Maria tend Andrea's memorial. Neel updates Rolf on Molly. Jarl to Astrid: car thief's DNA; no matches. Jarl returns sample to Rolf. Neel encounters local woman, area frequented by "Tranum Man". Neel net searches for Man's photo, which matches driver. She updates Rolf; proceeds into mink farm, where Man once lived. She finds Molly locked inside, Man approaches: then runs away. Neel pursues Man; they struggle. Renata coerces Julita into travelling towards Germany for abortion. Rolf learns of errors in DNA database. Tadek rushes to stop Julita; dies in vehicle collision. Neel: arrested Man, Molly's released.
3	3	"Babylugen" (Babylugen)	Henrik Ruben Genz	Torleif Hoppe	23 September 2019
Julita, still pregnant, attends Tadek's funeral with his family. Neel brings Rolf's files to Copenhagen. Rolf outraged that Minna archive has scant evidence. He accuses Jannik of only retaining evidence, which supported his theory of Zaid organising kidnapping. DNA from Minna's boot matches French killer. "Grandmother" advises Julita: give baby away. Gynaecologist cautions Julita about pre-eclampsia due to her high blood pressure. Police management berate Astrid for allowing Jannik to close Minna's case without finding kidnapper. They re-open Minna's case; Rolf's appointed to liaise with French authorities. Jannik gets investigated for evidence tampering. Astrid to Rolf: focus investigation on Minna's case. Neel and Staahl join Rolf's team. Rolf welcomes Claire to Copenhagen. He provides Minna's case files. Claire: murder victim ate krówki; stuck in her teeth. Rolf resides at Jarl and Eva's home. Rolf collects his fishing gear from Maria; meets Lars. Julita stays at Mandorla birth clinic for childbirth. Rolf and Claire travel to Tworóg. They meet local policeman, Karol. Karol: did not send any evidence to Denmark. Staahl updates Neel on situation. Rolf has Polish police check cars on Andrea's ferry. Neel questions Minna's mother, who remembers receiving Polish phone call. Staahl informs Claire of caller's name.
4	4	"Victoria" (Victoria)	Henrik Ruben Genz	Torleif Hoppe, Nanna Westh	30 September 2019
Rolf, Claire and Karol interview Polish phone caller, Sandra. She saw Minna with kidnapper and woman. Sandra provides cellphone video of kidnapper. Neel researches murder victim's identity from her tattoo. Jarl does not recognise kidnapper or Mandorla's symbol. Julita meets fellow pregnant women at clinic. Most women leave their baby for adoption. Julita and Irenka refuse to sign adoption form. Neel interviews tattooist: victim was accompanied by kidnapper. Neel identifies Victoria. Back in Denmark, Rolf meets Victoria's carers, Bror and Vibeke. Bror recently returned from Bangladesh; does not recognise kidnapper. Prior continues coercing Julita into signing adoption form. Irenka has her twins; nuns take them away. Melanie does not recognise kidnapper. Astrid scolds Rolf for investigating Andrea's disappearance while in Poland. He learnt ferry had stolen car, which was later found with baby's bottle and Mandorla's symbol. Maria helps Rolf move into neighbouring flat. Rolf describes stolen car on Andrea's ferry. Nuns claim Irenka's twins were stillborn. Julita prevented from leaving clinic; she goes into labour. Claire reiterates that Rolf must focus on Minna's case; not pursue own agenda. Claire traced Victoria's phone to Parisienne building. Inside, they find that Grégoire and Fabien have newborn child. Rolf discovers Danish toys.
5	5	"Cloister" (Klosteret)	Kasper Gaardsøe, Henrik Ruben Genz	Torleif Hoppe, Nanna Westh	7 October 2019
Julita births her daughter; nuns immediately remove baby. Police sample Grégoire and Fabien's DNA. Grégoire: met Victoria and kidnapper. Kidnapper employed by Bliss. Grégoire: provided sperm for Victoria, surrogate mother. Astrid and Neel interview Bror and Vibeke. They deny Victoria was pregnant or gave birth. Forensics: Victoria was never pregnant. Claire: Grégoire's not father; child removed. Karol to Claire: several missing children, considerable illegal adoptions. Rolf updates Maria on finding child; no news on Andrea. Karol: Stalowa Wola clinic's women complained about baby stealing. Nun tells Julita: baby was stillborn. Julita searches clinic for baby. She locks herself in office, phones police to report child stealing. Rolf and Karol meet Prior. Prior explains their adoption protocols. Rolf asks about Julita's case. Five years earlier: Policeman disbelieves Julita, she's contradicted by Prior, who displays dead baby. Present: Prior to Rolf: Julita had puerperal psychosis after stillbirth. Karol: numerous mothers claimed baby stealing. Prior: some mothers cannot accept stillbirths. Rolf visits Julita's former home; receives her keepsakes. Julita arrives home, grabs her car, drives to clinic. Julita sees nuns put twins and girl into car. Julita follows car. Petrol station CCTV shows Victoria shopping. Kidnapper joins Victoria, they drive towards Mandorla convent.
6	6	"Bliss" (Bliss)	Kasper Gaardsøe, Henrik Ruben Genz	Torleif Hoppe, Nanna Westh	14 October 2019
Julita continues following car, which enters convent. Five years later: Rolf's team arrive at convent-orphanage. Abbess does not recognise Victoria or kidnapper. Nuns burning birth records. Abbess: obsolete confidential records. Rolf rescues logbook. Kidnapper's car registered to Oliver. Neel fights Oliver, who takes her gun. Julita infiltrates convent posing as nun. Neel updates Rolf and Claire: Oliver lived near Minna. Neel to Claire: Rolf's daughter was taken. Bliss linked to Beaulieus fertility clinic. Astrid berates Rolf for investigating Andrea. Cornelia takes Julita to her room. Julita sees Irenka's twins. Claire cautions Rolf: show restraint with Beaulieus. Nicolas: do not know Bliss nor Mandorla; nothing to do with surrogacy. Rolf approaches Beaulieus' daughter, Emma. Claire warns Rolf to leave her alone. Neel believes Melanie lied in her interview. Staahl: Malanie's had three children to three different Frenchmen. Rolf takes Emma's sample. He tells Maria about finding link between French clinic and baby trafficking. Claire confronts Rolf about his sampling. Julita learns her baby's transferred tomorrow. Cornelia discovers Julita's identity; nuns lock her up. Beaulieus admit to approaching Mandorla via Bliss but they rejected Minna, as too old. Emma was born to Canadian surrogate mother. Julita sees child leaving in another car.
7	7	"Aunt Nova" (Moster Nova)	Kasper Gaardsøe, Henrik Ruben Genz	Torleif Hoppe, Nanna Westh	21 October 2019
At Bror's centre, Neel asks for Melanie. Bror: gone to Sweden. Neel doubts Bror. Oliver knocks out Neel. Staahl: Bror and Oliver know each other. Rolf rushes to centre. Nuns coerce Julita to remain at convent. Nun Beata provides Julita's room key. Neel guarded by Oliver. Oliver recalls he accidentally ran over Victoria. Neel: Bror will abandon Oliver. Rolf arrives, blocks Bror's car. Oliver arrives with gun. Bror orders Oliver to place Rolf in police car. As Bror drives towards Oliver, he shoots and kills Bror. Jarl: Bror's centre had mothers of 27 children. Rolf to Astrid: Minna returned to convent. As Julita leaves convent, Melanie arrives with Minna. Julita confronts Victoria. Melanie: Bror claimed Minna was abused. Convent baby taken; Oliver grabbed Minna. Julita follows Melanie to Bror. Melanie to Julita: baby left with "Aunt Nova". Torstein: Maria's pregnant. Rolf and Karol visit Piotr. Karol: check Minna's DNA. Paulina arrives with Minna. Rolf: need link between Bror and Mandorla. Centre's babies signed over by family affairs agent. Rolf notes Eva's Catholic. Jarl apologises to Rolf. Julita confronts Eva, who denies baby trafficking. Jarl warns Julita to leave, displays his police badge. Neel arrests Eva and Jarl.
8	8	"Pass It On" (Giv det videre)	Kasper Gaardsøe, Henrik Ruben Genz	Torleif Hoppe, Nanna Westh	28 October 2019
Jarl charged with criminal interference in investigation, manipulating DNA database. Eva's Bliss network's leader. Jarl bribed Zaid to obscure evidence. Astrid: do not know whether Jarl's connected to Andrea's disappearance. Rolf and Neel observe meeting: Piotr, Paulina and Minna with Gunvor. Minna cannot return to Poland. Maria and Lars help Rolf move into house. Neel: Julita arrived days after Minna's kidnapping. Rolf confronts Jarl in jail. Jarl denies arranging Andrea's kidnapping; Julita took Andrea. Rolf assaults Jarl. Jarl: Julita's baby had died. Julita followed Jarl, Rolf and Andrea onto ferry. Julita took Andrea, believing she's Hania. Neel: Julita's baby died of SIDS. Claire: Julita took Andrea? Astrid and Claire learn: Jarl assaulted. Guard: Jarl mentioned Maison Marguerite, single mothers' home. When Julita returns home, "Grandmother" has died. Jarl bribes Julita to keep quiet: identity documents, money for herself and Hania. Advises Julita: dump Tadek's car. Eva had worked for Maison Marguerite. Rolf sees Julita with Hania at Maison Marguerite. Neel phones Rolf: wanted for assault. Rolf meets Julita and Hania; buys Hania an icecream. Police arrive in area, surveille Rolf and Julita. Claire sees Rolf collect Hania's icecream stick. Claire phones Rolf; he disposes of stick. Police arrest Rolf.

=== Season two ===
No. overall	No. in season	Title	Directed by	Written by	Original release date
9	1	"Hepatitis" (Hepatitis)	Fabian Wullenweber	Torleif Hoppe	18 December 2022
Men unload numerous people from truck, leaving others inside. Hania's fishing, while Julita reads. Rolf approaches; invites Julita and Hania for fishing trip. Rolf meets Hooman, who reports Jarl dropped charges. Rolf's reinstated, working alongside Neel. Maria and Torstein's daughter's born. Rolf learns their baby has hepatitis, requires liver transplant. Cluj: Mario and family farewell Nicoleta, who boards minibus to work for Lazâr. France: Julita and Hania arrive at lake. Rolf admits he's divorced. Hania catches fish. Julita orders Rolf to stay away from Hania; he reveals Hania's his daughter, Andrea. Torstein to Rolf: looking for donors. Transplant doctor recommends website to find potential living donors. Website lists organs for sale. Thug films Mario getting beaten. Family report Mario's assault and Nicoleta's kidnapping to policeman Dalca. Mario searches for Nicoleta. Rolf becomes Torstein's agent: contacts illegal donor. Mario boards Lazâr's minibus; other passengers believe they are getting work in Denmark. Rolf and Torstein travel to meet donor. When they arrive, vehicles drive off. Inside house they find human organs in fridge. Rolf calls Neel: bring forensics; at least four people's organs. Staahl: phone registered to unwitting woman. Minibus arrives, passengers herded into barn. Rolf and Neel find abandoned truck; inside are numerous mutilated corpses.
10	2	"19 Dead" (19 døde)	Fabian Wullenweber	Torleif Hoppe	18 December 2022
Hooman, police and forensic teams arrive. Neel: 19 bodies, many with abdomen slashed by box cutter. Victims were all Vietnamese, drivers were Romanian. Julita ignores Rolf's calls. Mario finds Nicoleta and Cosma's names etched on barn wall. Lazâr displays people to buyers. Mario's sold to Bebe. Forensic analyst: victims suffocated; cut after death. Organs in fridge belong to victims. Neel: masked perpetrator filmed at petrol station, same phone Rolf called. Perpetrator rang Christian. Mario taken to slaughterhouse. Mario owes Bebe and Lazâr; payments deducted from wages. Mario's fellow worker, Vasilica warns: do not describe family. Rolf, Neel question Christian. Christian: unknown man wanted Romanian doctor, Kovacik. Mario, Florin work at construction site. Bebe assigns Mario to drive. Neel: Kovacki operated on Romanians, sold their organs. Staahl: tracing house owner's transactions. Florin's bashed for trying to run off. Vasilica: use internet app to search for sister. Staahl: tracked victim's phone; her father's in Denmark. Father recalls being trafficked to barn in Sovang. Mario observes buried tank unearthed. Mario receives message: Livinia saw Nicoleta. Mario to Bebe: no message from sister. Rolf and Neel travel towards Sovang, they discover car following them, which leads to barn. Lavinia messages Mario: Nicoleta's here. Mario escapes from Bebe.
11	3	"Box People" (Græsruten)	Fabian Wullenweber	Torleif Hoppe	1 January 2023
Hooman photographs names on barn wall. Barn's owner: workers from Panacea Baltic. Mario enters brothel, meets Dorina: cannot see Nicoleta. Vietnamese victims travelled through France. Suspect called French number. Claire joins investigation. Rolf visits Maria, Torstein and Siw. Siw's poor liver function slightly improved. Upon spotting minivan, Rolf has Neel find number plate. Staahl: car stolen; Frank owns Panacea. Mario police report: Nicoleta forced into prostitution. Policeman: Mario requires passport. Rolf and Claire meet Alex, who traced suspect's call. Neel visits Panacea offices. Frank: provide employees to employers. Neel: want details of employees; Frank's database protected by offshore laws. Claire and Rolf pose as restaurateurs, looking for workers. They encounter Quyen, victim of trafficking, who journeyed from Asia to France. Quyen recognises truck, from Romania onwards. Drivers were masked, company was Work-Force. Dropped off in Paris, truck continued to Denmark. Neel confirms Work-Force subcontracted by Panacea. Staahl: workers withdraw from their accounts daily. Mario generates money from recycling; steals shop assistant's jacket. Mario enters brothel, asks for "Venus" gives payment for madam. Lazâr and Alfons arrive looking for Nicoleta, but they are gone. Rolf reaches Julita's home, but she's left. Rolf gets message: threatening Maria. Maria's being observed by Cosma.
12	4	"Work-Force" (De ukendtes grav)	Fabian Wullenweber	Torleif Hoppe	8 January 2023
Rolf warns Maria: lock doors. Upon arrival, Rolf sees Cosma drive off in minivan. Maria castigates Rolf for endangering her. Torstein, police arrive. Neel: tracing Work-Force's financials. Workers withdraw their pay, immediately pay another man. Neel: money trail to slaughterhouse. She sneaks in, Cosma runs away. Other men approach Neel. Mario and Nicoleta find Romanian embassy's closed. Lazâr chases them. Vasilica to Rolf: slaughterhouse boss' Silviu. Staahl: Romanian and Bulgarian passports. Mario escaped to find Nicoleta. Claire: various mafia groups involved. Julita visits Rolf, who explains: Julita took Andrea thinking she was Hania. Julita meets Maria. Rolf, Julita visit Tomb of Unknowns for her baby. Europol's Alonzo: Vietnamese Happy Trails donates to charities. Mario, Nicoleta on internet app: Livinia's helped by EMIDA. Neel, Hooman interview Frank and lawyers. Frank: comply with all regulations, only contacted Work-Force by email, no knowledge of human trafficking. Staahl: Mario's police complaint about Nicoleta's abduction. Hooman: Mario, Nicoleta were at barn. At brothel, Rolf questions prostitutes. Dorina: Nicoleta ran away with Mario. Dorina realises someone else posed as Livinia. Mario, Nicoleta approach EMIDA's office; Lazâr and Bebe chase them. Claire to Rolf: money leads to EMIDA. Mario, Nicoleta board Christian's van. Julita kidnapped by Cosma.
13	5	"Transylvanian Contractors" (Bortført)	Fabian Wullenweber	Torleif Hoppe	15 January 2023
Rolf, Staahl discover Julita's phone. CCTV shows Cosma abducting Julita. Rolf to Neel: arrest Christian. Christian takes Mario, Nicoleta to his estate; Lazâr and Bebe are waiting. They seriously assault Mario; Nicoleta's caged. Two weeks later: Rolf, Neel arrest Christian for trafficking. He admits to helping Mario, Nicoleta. Earlier: Alfons collects Nicoleta. Christian orders Lazâr: get rid of Mario. Present: Christian denies trafficking. Staahl: Mario matches truck driver's DNA. Lazâr orders Mario to drive truck with Cosma. Mario understands Cosma betrayed Nicoleta to Lazâr. Hooman: must gather enough evidence to hold Christian. Neel, Staahl: Vietnamese mafia used Romanian network. In France Rolf, Claire meet Hania. Rolf uses Claire's car to drive Hania to Denmark. Neel: Cosma's van burnt out. Mario, Cosma arrive in Romania. Cosma explains Work-Force operations. They herd Vietnamese refugees into truck. Rolf arrives home. Maria, Torstein, Siw visit Rolf, who introduces Hania as Julita's daughter. Claire has dinner with Happy Trails' owner, Dai. Claire sees photo: Dai, Christian, Frank. Mario's truck offloads 20 Vietnamese in France, rest leave for Denmark. Dai orders Mario: keep truck closed until payment sorted. Neel: asks Christian about Dai. Christian: did business years ago. Staahl: Cosma took Julita to Romania.
14	6	"Donor" (Donor)	Fabian Wullenweber	Torleif Hoppe	15 January 2023
Mario's truck arrives at Sovang; refugees are dead. Lazâr orders Cosma: sell organs to Kovacik. Hania minded by Maria. Rolf searches for Julita. Cosma advertises body parts. Rolf arrives; Lazâr: Cosma transport Mario. Mario notices Julita tied up. Rolf follows them to Romania. At Transylvanian Contrators, Dalca to Rolf: Cosma photographed at transplant hospital. Frank denies arrangements with Christian or Dai. Transplant Doctor: donor left. CCTV shows Mario, Cosma. Mario disarms and questions Cosma; Nicoleta's at Danish farm. Mario shoots Cosma's leg. Julita drives Mario back to Denmark. Accountant: Christian owns Work-Force, financially linked to Frank and Dai. Christian, Frank, Dai charged with trafficking. Hooman: Mario sold kidney, yesterday. Staahl: money funded Danish brothels. Romanian police arrest Cosma. Rolf, Claire back in Denmark. Mario at farm, finds Nicoleta, but is knocked out. Julita takes Hania from Maria's to Rolf's. Rolf explains to Maria how Andrea became Hania. At farm, Neel finds Mario's van; Lazâr, Alfons arrive. Neel enters; Mario and Lazâr struggle. Gun shoots Alfons, Neel injured. Rolf arrives, Lazâr holds knife to Nicoleta's neck. Mario shoots Lazâr's shoulder. Police arrive; Mario hospitalised. Maria: Julita to continue raising Hania, but maintain contact. Claire takes Julita, Hania back to France.
