= Wiktoria Gąsiewska =

Polish actress (born 1999)

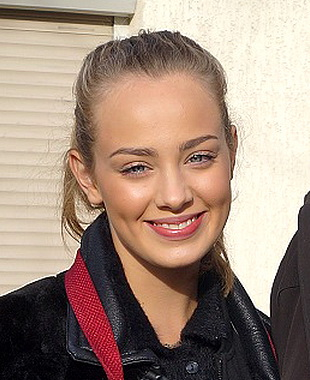
- Wiktoria Gąsiewska in 2018.
- Born: 11 March 1999 (age 27); Warsaw, Poland
- Occupation: Actress
- Years active: 2005–present

Wiktoria Aneta Gąsiewska (Polish: [vikˈtɔ.rja aˈnɛ.ta ɡɔw̃ˈɕɛf.ska]; born 11 March 1999) is a Polish television and film actress.

== Biography ==
Wiktoria Gąsiewska was born on 11 March 1999 in Warsaw, Poland. She has three siblings: Mateusz (also an actor), Nicola, and Oskar.

As a child, she was a member of a children's music band Gawęda. She had her acting debut in 2005, with an episodic role in the television series Na dobre i na złe. After that she also had main and reoccurring roles in the series such as Foster Family (2007–2009), Family.pl (2012–2013, 2016–2020), I'll Be Fine (2015), Friends (2015–2016), Barwy szczęścia (2016–present), and Kowalscy kontra Kowalscy (2021–2022). She also had numerous film roles, including in Jasminum (2006), Katyń (2007), Afonia and the Bees (2009), Baby Bump (2015), An Almost Perfect Scam (2019), Nobody Sleeps in the Woods Tonight (2020), Krime story. Love story (2022), and Święta inaczej (2022). She also had numerous voice acting roles in the Polish dubbing.

She was a judge in the TVP2 children's talent show Mini szansa in 2007, a co-host of Disney Channel talkshow I love Violetta from 2014 to 2015, a contestant in the talent shows Dancing with the Stars. Taniec z gwiazdami in 2018, and Dance Dance Dance in 2019, and a guest in the talkshow The Story of My Life. Historia naszego życia in 2018. Since 2020, together with Krzysztof Ibisz, she hosts the Polsat gameshow Łowcy nagród.

== Filmography ==
=== Films ===
| Year | Title | Role | Notes |
|---|---|---|---|
| 2006 | Jasminum | Eugenia | |
| 2007 | Katyń | Weronika | |
| 2007 | Koniec lata | Karolina | Short film |
| 2008 | Ladies | 9-years-old Łucja | |
| 2009 | Afonia and the Bees | Young Anielka | |
| 2011 | Battle of Warsaw 1920 | Background voices | Voice |
| 2015 | Baby Bump | Woman | |
| 2018 | 303 Squadron | Girl | |
| 2019 | An Almost Perfect Scam | Janusz's daughter | |
| 2020 | Nobody Sleeps in the Woods Tonight | Aniela Turek | |
| 2020 | Wielcy polscy ekonomiści | | Short film |
| 2021 | Świat pełen niespodzianek | Gąsia | Television film |
| 2022 | Krime story. Love story | Kamila Wójcik | |
| 2022 | Święta inaczej | Emma | |

=== Television series ===
| Year | Title | Role | Notes |
|---|---|---|---|
| 2005 | Na dobre i na złe | Marcelka Domańska | Episode: "Babcia do wynajęcia" (no. 223) |
| 2006 | The Darkness | Mrs. Orska's daughter | Episode: "Król życia" (no. 6) |
| 2007 | Codzienna 2 m. 3 | Klara | Episode no. 60 |
| 2007–2009 | Foster Family | Dorotka | Main role; 52 episodes |
| 2008 | Giraffe and Rhino Hotel | Zuza Miłobędzka | Voice; 6 episodes |
| 2011 | Komisarz Alex | Magda | Episode: "Pierwsza nagroda" (no. 8) |
| 2012–2013, 2016–2020 | Family.pl | Agata | Recurring role; 102 episodes |
| 2013 | True Law | Ania Czerwińska | Episode no. 40 |
| 2015 | I'll Be Fine | Karolina | 3 episodes |
| 2015–2016 | Friends | Sonia | Recurring role; 8 episodes |
| 2016–2024 | Barwy szczęścia | Oliwka Zbrowska | Main role; 392 episodes |
| 2018 | W rytmie serca | Natalia | Episode: "Romeo i Julia" (no. 23) |
| 2019–2024 | First Love | Jagoda Rogalska | Recurring role |
| 2020 | Everything's Gonna Be All Right, Darling | Justyna | Recurring role; 15 episodes |
| 2021 | Happiness Guaranteed | Bianka | Recurring role; 33 episodes |
| 2021–2022 | Kowalscy kontra Kowalscy | Ela Wołodyjowska | Recurring role; 21 episodes |
| 2023 | Father Matthew | Wiktoria Łempicka | Episode: "Znikający basen i alpaka" (no. 388) |
| 2023–2024 | Dzielnica strachu | Amelia Wiktorska | 3 episodes |
| 2024 | Algorytm miłości | Iwona | 7 episodes |

=== Television programmes ===
| Year | Title | Role | Notes |
|---|---|---|---|
| 2007 | Mini szansa | Judge | Talent show |
| 2014–2015 | I love Violetta | Co-host | Talkshow |
| 2018 | Dancing with the Stars. Taniec z gwiazdami | Contestant | Talent show |
| 2018 | The Story of My Life. Historia naszego życia | Guest | Talkshow |
| 2019 | Dance Dance Dance | Contestant | Talent show |
| 2020–2024 | Łowcy nagród | Co-host | Gameshow |
