= Magdalena Stużyńska =

Polish actress (born 1974)

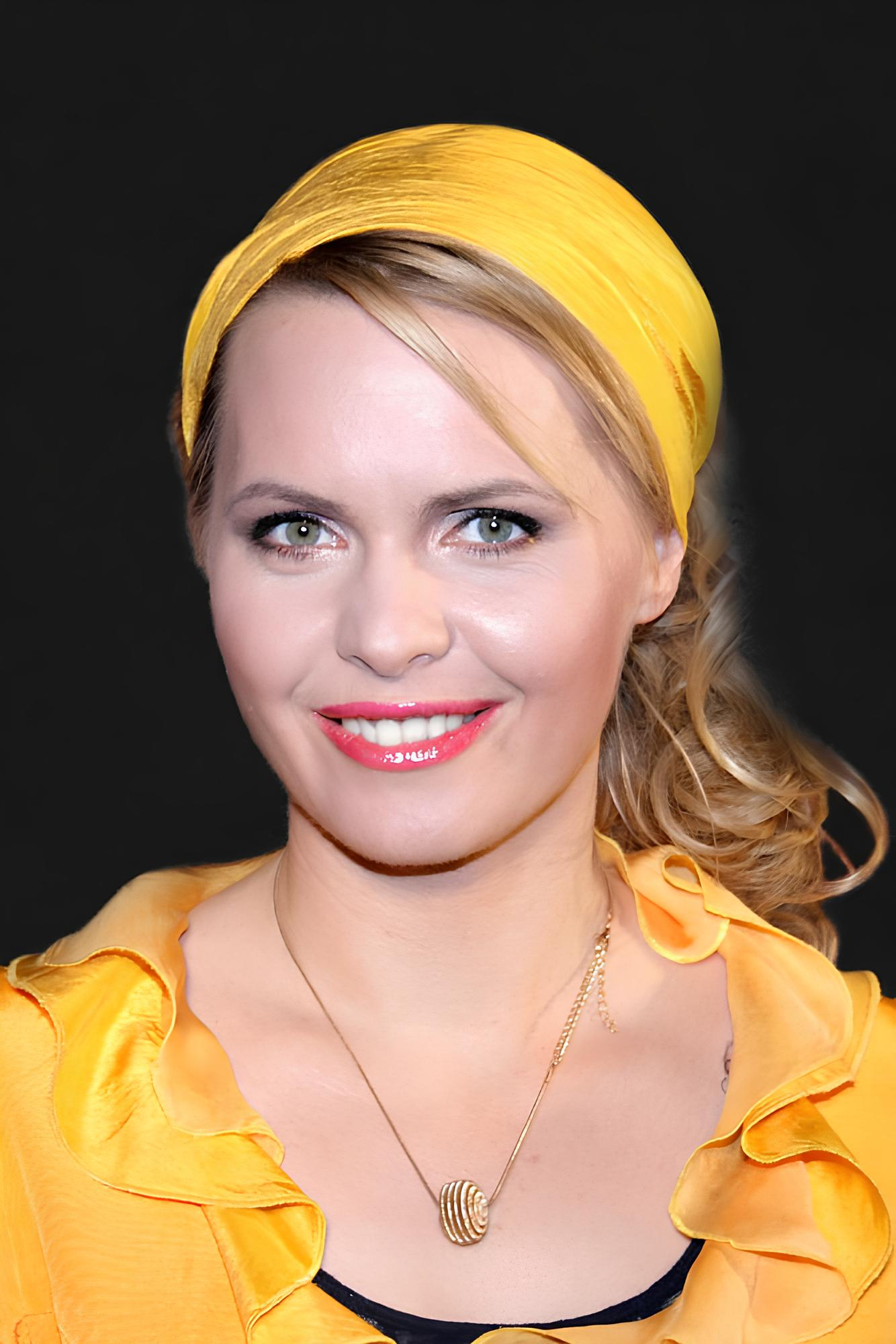
- Stużyńska in 2008
- Born: 25 March 1974 (age 51); Giżycko, Poland
- Occupation: Actress
- Spouse: Łukasz Brauer
- Children: 2

Magdalena Stużyńska-Brauer (born 25 March 1974) is a Polish actress, TV presenter and cabaret performer.

== Early life ==
Stużyńska was born in Giżycko on 25 March 1974. She graduated from the VIII LO im. Władysława IV in Warsaw.

== Career ==
As a young girl, Stużyńska belonged to the theater group at the Ochota Theater. At the age of 15, she appeared in the stage play Experiment directed by Halina Machulska. A year later, she made her debut on the big screen in the film Brama do raju directed by Ryszard Moch, where she portrayed a drug addict. Her role as Marcysia in the TV series Złotopolscy brought her popularity. Since 1999, he has been performing at the Kwadrat Theater in Warsaw.

In 1997, Stużyńska graduated from the Faculty of Theater Knowledge of the Theater Academy Aleksander Zelwerowicz in Warsaw. She co-hosted the program "Pytanie na breakfast" on TVP2.

In June 2012, Stużyńska joined the Kabaret Moralny Niepokoju. The same year, she started working on the set of the new Polsat television series Przyjaciółki, in which she plays the role of Anka Strzelecka. For this role, she was nominated for the Telekamery 2013 award in the Actress category. She also played in the series Na dobre i na evil (1999–2000), Hotel 52 (2010–2013) and Rodzinka.pl (2013, 2015–2020). In April 2017, she ended her activity in Kabaret Moranych Niepokoju.

== Personal life ==
Stużyńska is married to businessman, Łukasz Brauer. They have two sons, born May 2005 and April 2011.
