= Servant of the People (2023 TV series) =

2023 political satire comedy-drama television series

- Official poster
- Genre: Comedy drama; political satire
- Based on: Servant of the People by Volodymyr Zelenskyy
- Developed by: Okil Khamidov
- Directed by: Maciej Bieliński; Okil Khamidov
- Starring: Marcin Hycnar; Krzysztof Dracz; Danuta Stenka; Dorota Kolak; Sławomir Orzechowski; Magdalena Popławska; Hanna Konarowska
- Country of origin: Poland
- Original language: Polish
- No. of seasons: 1
- No. of episodes: 24

Production
- Executive producer: Krzysztof Landsberg
- Producers: Tamara Aagten-Margol; Beata Barcz; Okil Khamidov
- Cinematography: Tomasz Dobrowolski
- Editor: Michał Żytkowski
- Running time: 24 minutes
- Production company: Polot Media

Original release
- Network: Polsat
- Release: 4 March 2023 – present

Servant of the People (Polish: Sługa narodu) is a Polish-language political satire comedy-drama television series created by Okil Khamidov, and directed by Khamidov and Maciej Bieliński. The series follows Ignacy Konieczny, portrayed by Marcin Hycnar, who becomes the president of Poland. It was based on a 2015 Ukraine-made television series titled Servant of the People, created by Volodymyr Zelenskyy. The series premiered on Polsat television station and Polsat Box Go streaming service on 4 March 2023, and as of July 2023 has one season of 24 episodes, and a second season in production.

== Plot ==
Ignacy Konieczny (Marcin Hycnar), a 36-year-old teacher, while talking with his colleague, makes a passionate speech about the current political situation in Poland. The speech gets recorded by a bystander, and uploaded to the Internet, where it becomes viral. Konieczny becomes famous across the country and is seen as a hero of the people. Soon, he is elected the president of Poland. After being elected, he refuses the presidential privileges, determined to lead a simplistic life, which leads to comical situations.

== Cast ==
- Marcin Hycnar as Ignacy Konieczny, the president of Poland
- Krzysztof Dracz as Cezary Kujawa, the Prime Minister of Poland
- Danuta Stenka as Maria Nowacka, the chief of the Office of the President
- Hanna Konarowska as Alicja Halicka, Ignacy's ex-wife and the president of the National Bank of Poland
- Magdalena Popławska as Basia Mazur, Ignacy's sister
- Sławomir Orzechowski as Lucjan Konieczny, Ignacy's father
- Dorota Kolak as Ewa Konieczna, Ignacy's mother
- Ewa Sadowska, as Oliwia Mazur, Ignacy's niece
- Marcin Bosak, as the chief of secret services
- Michał Lewandowski, as Kazik Zawada, the chairperson of the Supreme Audit Office
- Sebastian Perdek, as captain Grzegorz Jarosz, the Minister of National Defence
- Mariusz Ostrowski, as Michał Zieliński, the Minister of Foreign Affairs

== Production ==
The television series was based on Servant of the People, a Ukraine-made 2015 television series, with a similar premise of a high school teacher becoming the president of Ukraine, created and produced by Volodymyr Zelenskyy. The rights to make a Poland-focused remake were bought by Okil Khamidov, however no studio in Poland was originally interested in picking it up. Zelenskyy became the president of Ukraine in 2019. In 2022, in the wake of the Russian invasion of Ukraine and Zelenskyy's wartime leadership, the show's popularity received a notable boost internationally. Considering that, the Polish remake was picked up by Polsat.

The Polish-language remake was created by Okil Khamidov, and directed by Khamidov and Maciej Bieliński. The series was ordered by Polsat, and made by Polot Media, between 2022 and 2023. The executive producer was Krzysztof Landsberg, the producers were Beata Barcz, Tamara Aagten-Margol, and Okil Khamidov, the editor was Michał Żytkowski, and the cinematographer was Tomasz Dobrowolski. The main cast included: Marcin Hycnar, Krzysztof Dracz, Danuta Stenka, Dorota Kolak, Sławomir Orzechowski, Magdalena Popławska, and Hanna Konarowska.

The series premiered on 4 March 2023 on Polsat television station. The series was also simultaneously published on Polsat Box Go streaming service. Its first season has 24 episodes, each lasting 24 minutes. It was watched by 587 000 viewers. The first episode of the series was sent by Okil Khamidov to Volodymyr Zelenskyy, who reportedly liked it, and was glad that the series was finally made, after years of attempts.

Polsat had ordered the second season, with its production beginning on 14 June 2023. It will have 30 episodes, directed by Okil Khamidov and Mariusz Palej. The main cast will be joined by Tomasz Ciachorowski and Andrzej Grabowski.
