= Marcin Rogacewicz =

Polish actor

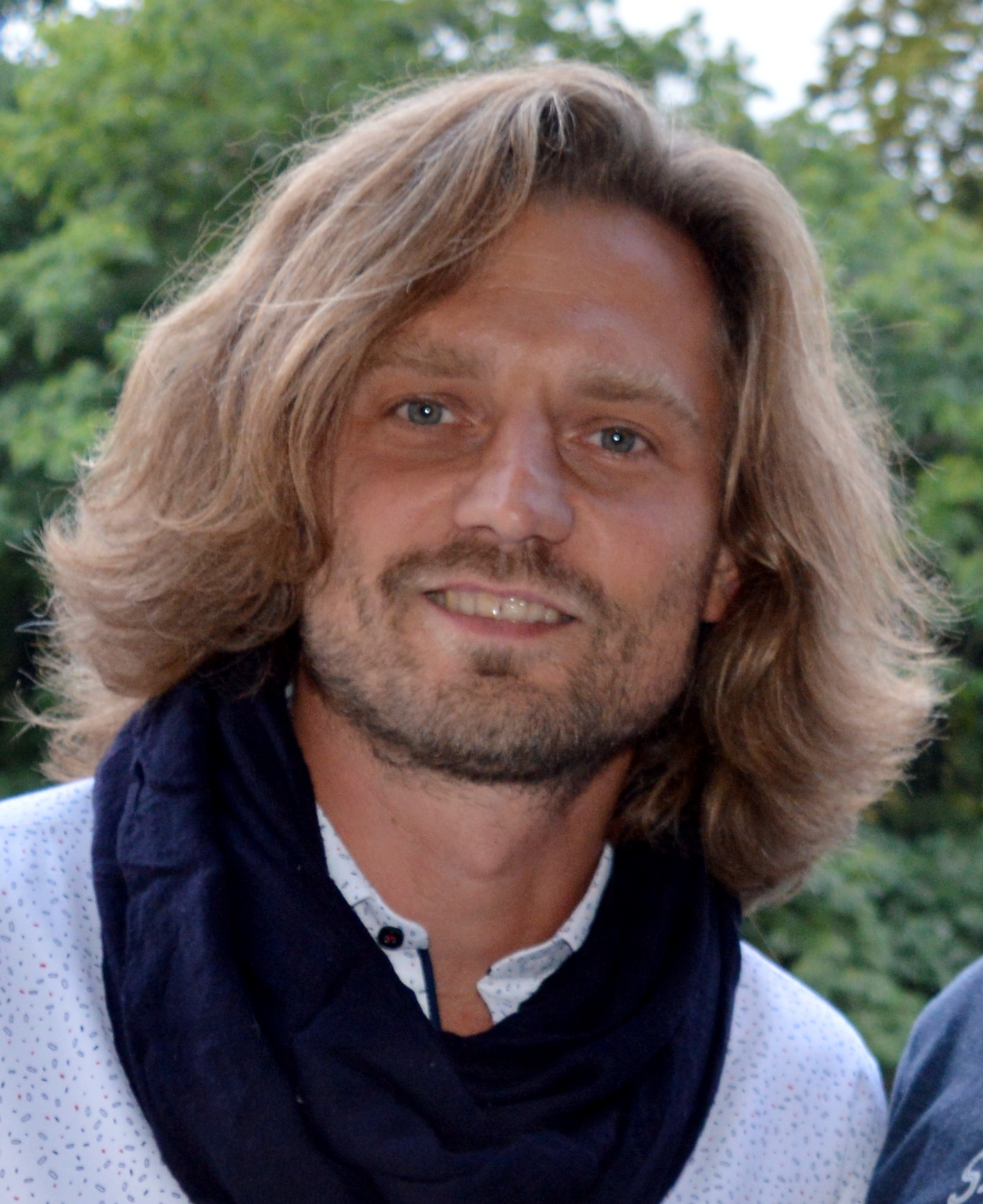
- Marcin Rogacewicz, 2018
- Born: 25 March 1980 (age 45); Ciechanów, Poland
- Occupation: Actor

Marcin Rogacewicz (born 25 March 1980 in Ciechanów) is a Polish television actor.

In 2007 he graduated from the Faculty of Acting School in Łódź. He debuted in a TV series Kryminalni.

== Filmography ==
- 2008: Agentki, as Tomasz Muszyński vel Irina Dowbor
- 2008: Kryminalni, as Michał Adamski
- 2008–2018: Na dobre i na złe, as Przemysław Zapała
- 2010–2012: Szpilki na Giewoncie, as Grzegorz Zwoliński
- 2012–2017: Friends, as Michał Zalewski
- 2018–2019: Korona królów, as Jan of Melsztyn
