= Kowalscy kontra Kowalscy =

- Genre: Comedy drama
- Based on: The Ivanovs vs. The Ivanovs
- Written by: Okil Khamidov
- Directed by: Okil Khamidov
- Starring: Piotr Adamczyk; Marieta Żukowska; Wojciech Mecwaldowski; Katarzyna Kwiatkowska; Paweł Wawrzecki; Patryk Cebulski; Jakub Zdrójkowski; Wiktoria Gąsiewska; Mikołaj Cieślak; Joanna Orleańska; Bartosz Obuchowicz; Jerzy Bończak
- Music by: Akhmad Bakaev
- Country of origin: Poland
- Original language: Polish
- No. of seasons: 2
- No. of episodes: 44

Production
- Producers: Okil Khamidov; Krzysztof Hansz; Tamara Aagten-Margol
- Cinematography: Tomasz Dobrowolski; Maciej Tarapacz
- Editors: Paweł Sitkiewicz (season 1); Paweł Potocki
- Running time: 22 minutes
- Production company: Tako Media Polska

Original release
- Network: Polsat
- Release: March 6, 2021 – May 28, 2022

Kowalscy kontra Kowalscy (Polish: [kɔˈval.st͡sɘ̟ ˈkɔn.tra kɔˈval.st͡sɘ̟]; lit. 'The Kowalskis vs. the Kowalskis') is a Polish-language comedy drama television series written and directed by Okil Khamidov, and produced by Khamidov, Krzysztof Hansz, and Tamara Aagten-Margol. The series was produced in Poland by Tako Media Polska for Polsat. It has 2 seasons, consisting of a total of 44 episodes, each lasting 22 minutes. The first episode aired on 6 March 2021, and the final episode, on 28 May 2022. It was based on a 2017 Russian-language television series titled The Ivanovs vs. The Ivanovs.

== Premise ==
After being born, Jan and Nikodem, two children from two unrelated families, both with the surname Kowalski, get mixed up in the hospital, ending up with the wrong families. Jan ends up with businessperson Piotr Kowalski, and his wife, Anna, who are a rich family living in a luxurious villa. Meanwhile, Nikodem ends up with Henryk and Jadwiga Kowalski, a poor uneducated family living in a ramshackle cottage. After 17 years two families discover the truth about their children.

== Cast ==
- Piotr Adamczyk as Piotr Kowalski
- Marieta Żukowska as Anna Orłowska-Kowalska
- Wojciech Mecwaldowski as Henryk Kowalski
- Katarzyna Kwiatkowska as Jadwiga Kowalska
- Paweł Wawrzecki as Zenon Kowalski
- Patryk Cebulski as Janek Kowalski
- Jakub Zdrójkowski as Nikodem Kowalski
- Elżbieta Firek-Wójcik as Kasia
- Kazimierz Mazur as Sławomir Janiak
- Mikołaj Cieślak as Hamlet Wołodyjowski
- Joanna Orleańska as Milana Wołodyjowska
- Wiktoria Gąsiewska as Ofelia "Ela" Wołodyjowska
- Bartosz Obuchowicz as Stefan
- Martyna Solska as Diana
- Przemysław Bluszcz as Albert
- Leszek Żukowski as Grzechu
- Michał Zakrzewski as Tadziu
- Andrzej Kłak as Stachu
- Arkadiusz Nader as Wacek
- Anna Czartoryska-Niemczycka as Laura
- Jerzy Bończak as Józef Orłowski

== Production ==
The series is based on a 2017 Russian-language television series titled The Ivanovs vs. The Ivanovs, produced for STS television network, and directed by Anton Fedotov, Andrei Elinson, Sergey Znamenskiy, Fyodor Stukov, and Alyona Korchagina.

Kowalscy kontra Kowalscy was written and directed by Okil Khamidov, and produced by Khamidov, Krzysztof Hansz, and Tamara Aagten-Margol. The cinematography was done by Tomasz Dobrowolski and Maciej Tarapacz, music by Akhmad Bakaev, editing by Paweł Sitkiewicz (season 1) and Paweł Potocki (season 2), and scenography by Małgorzata Skwarek. The show was filmed in Warsaw, Poland, and produced by Tako Media Polska for Polsat television network.

The production began on 7 June 2020. The main cast included: Piotr Adamczyk, Marieta Żukowska, Wojciech Mecwaldowski, Katarzyna Kwiatkowska, Paweł Wawrzecki, Patryk Cebulski, Jakub Zdrójkowski, Wiktoria Gąsiewska, Mikołaj Cieślak, Joanna Orleańska, and Bartosz Obuchowicz. The first episode of the season aired on 6 March 2021, and its final episode, on 8 May 2021.

The production of the second season began on 26 May 2021. The main cast was joined by Jerzy Bończak. Its first season aired on 5 March 2022, and the final episode, on 28 May 2022.

In June 2022, the management of Polsat informed that the production of the third season was halted, and the series was canceled. Such decision was made due to the Russian origin of the show, in a wake of the 2022 Russian invasion of Ukraine.

== Episodes ==
Season	Episodes	Airdate	
Season	Episodes	First episode	Last episode
1	20	6 March 2021	8 May 2021
2	24	5 March 2022	28 May 2022
