= Cultural manager =

Person who promotes, manages, and executes cultural projects

A cultural manager (Spanish: gestor/gestora cultural) is a person who is motivated by the improvement of art, works independently and professionally with knowledge of the subject, and develops work as a mediator between governmental and/or private cultural institutions with artists from different areas to articulate their work in the market with promotion and national and international dissemination.

In the English-speaking world, the equivalent is an arts administrator (or arts manager).

The cultural manager works by looking for specific measures of success, always intending to improve the level of culture, seeking active cohesion between society, the governmental sector, the private sector, and the artists. The work of culture management poses learning challenges in diverse areas such as the administration of economic resources, training, and artistic communication.

Cultural management is a new profession. A person who is dedicated to this work is characterized by having abilities to visualize and interpret talent, knowing how to establish a dialogue with artists to link them to cultural projects to develop.

Universities that offer degree programs in cultural management include the University of Antioquia, the Latin American Social Sciences Institute, the University of Chile, the University of Córdoba, the National University of Colombia, the University of Barcelona, the Open University of Catalonia, the Pontifical Catholic University of Valparaíso, and the University of Piura.
