= First Love (2004 TV series) =

Polish television soap opera

- Genre: Soap opera
- Created by: Okil Khamidov
- Written by: Paweł Nowicki; Grażyna Wilczyńska; Ilona Morusek; Andrzej Staszczyk; Maura Ładosz
- Directed by: Okil Khamidow (from 2004); Paweł Chmielewski (2006–2007); Krzysztof Łebski (from 2008); Dominik Matwiejczyk (2008–2009); Ireneusz Engler (2009–2010); Ewa Pytka (from 2011)
- Country of origin: Poland
- Original language: Polish
- No. of seasons: 23
- No. of episodes: 4,300

Production
- Running time: 33 minutes

Original release
- Network: Polsat: Polsat 2; Polsat Film; ATM Rozrywka; TV4
- Release: 4 November 2004 – present

Pierwsza miłość (English: "First Love") is a Polish soap opera set in Wrocław. It has been broadcast continually on the Polsat television channel since 4 November 2004. Scenes from the show were redubbed for a sketch in the 2006 British television comedy series Time Trumpet, and they later formed the basis of the 2007 Irish sitcom Soupy Norman.

== Cast and characters ==
Actor	Character	Stint
Aneta Zając	Maria Radosz	2004–
Ewa Skibińska	Teresa Kopytko–Żukowska	2004–2012; 2019–
Maciej Tomaszewski	Marek Żukowski	2004–
Aleksandra Zienkiewicz	Kinga Kulczycka	2004–
Anna Ilczuk	Emilia Miedzianowska	2004–
Łukasz Płoszajski	Artur Kulczycki	2004–
Paweł Okoński	Marian Śmiałek	2004–
Tomasz Lulek	Antoni Turczyk	2004–
Rafał Kwietniewski	Bartek Miedzianowski	2005–
Jan Jankowski	Grzegorz Król	2008–
Paweł Krucz	Błażej Król	2008–
Dominika Kojro	Aleksandra Król	2008–
Grażyna Wolszczak	Grażyna Weksler	2008–
Urszula Dębska	Sabina Weksler	2008–
Karol Strasburger	Karol Weksler	2009–
Aleksandra Kisio	Agata Skowrońska	2009; 2013–
Maria Pakulnis	Aneta Wróbel–Pałkowska	2004–2007; 2009–
Michał Koterski	Henryk "Kaśka" Saniewski	2009–
Błażej Michalski	Mikołaj "Mikser" Serczyński	2010–
Joanna Kupińska	Izabela Czaja–Kulczycka	2010–2017; 2019–
Lech Dyblik	Roman Kłosek	2010–
Maurycy Torbicz	Mirek Jedliński	2010–
Halszka Lehman	Wiktoria Dąbek	2010–
Agnieszka Wielgosz	Malwina Dąbek–Florek	2010–
Michał Czernecki	Hubert Schultz	2011–
Marcin Krajewski	Adam Wysocki	2011–
Marek Kaliszuk	Robert Szymczak	2011–
Anna Szymańczyk	Dagmara Maciejewska	2011–
Małgorzata Sadowska	Aurelia Walicka	2011–
Łucja Kawczak	Julka Radosz (#2)	2011–
Patryk Pniewski	Krystian Domański	2012–
Julia Pogrebińska	Amelia Długosz	2013–
Wojciech Błach	Michał Domański	2015–
Elżbieta Romanowska	Karolina Kazan–Krojewicz	2015–
Ewa Gawryluk	Ewa Nowak	2015–
Agnieszka Suchora	Anna Radziwiłł	2016–2021
Katarzyna Sawczuk	Marianna Radziwiłł	2016–
Marcin Rogacewicz	Ksawery Jarząbek	2017–
Edyta Herbuś	Sylwia Konecka	2017–
Magdalena Wróbel	Dorota Marska	2018–
Aleksandra Gintrowska	Goska	2018–
Lesław Żurek	Mateusz Stik	2019–
Zbigniew Waleryś	Jacek Marski	2019–
Aneta Zając	Dominika Porcz	2019–
Wiktoria Gąsiewska	Jagoda Rogalska	2019–
Alina Kamińska	Jadwiga Rogalska	2019–
Janusz Onufrowicz	Janusz Rogalski	2019–
Karolina Sawka	Magdalena Matuszewska	2020–
Przemysław Cypryański	i Marcin Zabawa	2020–
Honorata Witańska	Marta Andruszkiewicz	2020–
Joanna Moro	Basia	2021–
Rafał Maserak	Maks	2021–
Tomasz Oświeciński	Fabian Tomczak	2021–
Piotr Cyrwus	Kazimierz Wąs	2021–
Przemysław Sadowski	Jakub Wenerski	2021–
Katarzyna Maciąg	Laura Kowalik	2021–
Dariusz Wieteska	Arkadiusz Wolak	2022–
Patryk Cebulski	Borys Wojnar	2023–
Jowita Budnik	Paulina Sawicka	2023–
Małgorzata Szeptycka	Krystyna Kania	2023–
Alan Andersz	Alan Korzeniowski	2024–
Bogdan Kalus	Zdzisław Kowalski	2024–
Anna Samusionek	Łucja Reterska	2025–
Adriana Kalska	Adelajda Żak	2026–
