= Friends (2012 TV series) =

- Also known as: Przyjaciółki
- Genre: Drama Series
- Written by: Beata Pasek
- Directed by: Grzegorz Kuczeriszka
- Starring: Małgorzata Socha; Anita Sokołowska; Joanna Liszowska; Magdalena Stużyńska; Bartłomiej Kasprzykowski; Lesław Żurek; Marcin Rogacewicz; Mariusz Zaniewski; Michał Rolnicki; Adam Krawczyk; Agnieszka Sienkiewicz
- Composer: Łukasz Targosz
- Country of origin: Poland
- Original language: Polish
- No. of seasons: 26
- No. of episodes: 314

Production
- Production locations: Warsaw, Poland
- Running time: 45 minutes
- Production companies: Akson Studio; Polsat

Original release
- Network: Polsat
- Release: 6 September 2012 – 27 November 2025

Friends (Polish: Przyjaciółki) is a Polish TV-drama which premiered on 6 September 2012 on Polsat.

== Plot ==
The series follow the story of four friends who met in high school. Their paths then diverged. They meet again years later at a class meeting and realise that they need each other like they never did before. The action happens in Warsaw.

== Production ==
The pilot episode was filmed in April 2012. Then it was watched by a group of people similar to the profile of the typical Polsat's viewer. The study found that people are willing to come back to it after an advertising break. A positive test result was reflected in the 13 episodes that filmed from July to September 2012.

== Casts ==
- Małgorzata Socha as Inga Gruszewska
- Joanna Liszowska as Partycja Kochan
- Anita Sokołowska as Zuzanna Markiewicz
- Magdalena Stużyńska as Anna Strzelecka
- Bartłomiej Kasprzykowski as Paweł, Anna's husband
- Marcin Rogacewicz as Michał, Patrycja's boyfriend
- Adam Krawczyk as Andrzej, Inga's husband
- Agnieszka Sienkiewicz as Dorota, Andrzej's paramour
- Lesław Żurek as Wojtek
- Mariusz Zaniewski as Piotr
- Michał Rolnicki as Rafał
- Pola Figurska/Alicja Wieniawa-Narkiewicz/Maja Szopa as Hania, Inga's and Andrzej's daughter
- Antoni Borowski as Staś, Anna's and Paweł's son
- Kajetan Borowski as Franek, Anna's and Paweł's son
- Nicole Bogdanowicz as Julka, Anna's and Paweł's daughter
- Zofia Cybul as Marysia, Inga's daughter
- Mateusz Janicki as Maks, Inga's husband
- Paweł Małaszyński as Artur Morawski, Patrycja's neighbour
- Laura Breszka as Marta
- Mateusz Damięcki as Błażej

== Ratings ==
Friends premiered on Polsat on Thursday, 6 September 2012 at 10 pm and attracted the audience of 2.604 million. It reached the share of 25.22% in group "16–49" and 25.05% among all viewers. It was the most watched program in its timeslot.

List of ratings by series
Series	Episodes	Timeslot	Series premiere	Series finale	TV season	Viewers (in millions)	Average share (16-49)
1	13	Thursday 10 pm	6 September 2012	29 November 2012	Fall 2012	2 395 984	22,72%
2	13	Thursday 9:10 pm	28 February 2013	23 May 2013	Spring 2013	2 586 742	19,82%
3	13	Thursday 9:10 pm	6 March 2014	29 May 2014	Spring 2014	2 004 531	14,70%
4	11	Thursday 9:10 pm	11 September 2014	20 November 2014	Fall 2014	2 056 695	13,73%
5	12	Thursday 9:10 pm	5 March 2015	21 May 2015	Spring 2015	2 181 597	14,19%
6	12	Thursday 9:10 pm	3 September 2015	26 November 2015	Fall 2015	2 020 881	12,67%
7	12	Thursday 9:10 pm	3 March 2016	19 May 2016	Spring 2016	1 989 944	13,80%
8	12	Thursday 9:10 pm	1 September 2016	17 November 2016	Fall 2016	1 959 775	
9	12	Thursday 9:10 pm	2 March 2017	18 May 2017	Spring 2017	1 792 162	
10	12	Thursday 9:10 pm	7 September 2017	23 November 2017	Fall 2017	1 946 658	
11	12	Thursday 9:10 pm	1 March 2018	17 May 2018	Spring 2018	1 792 469	
12	12	Thursday 9:10 pm	6 September 2018	22 November 2018	Fall 2018	1 795 557	
13	12	Thursday 9:10 pm	28 February 2019	23 May 2019	Spring 2019	1 677 362	
14	12	Thursday 9:10 pm	5 September 2019	21 November 2019	Fall 2019	1 594 399	
15	12	Thursday 9:10 pm	5 March 2020	21 May 2020	Spring 2020	1 435 871	
16	12	Thursday 9:10 pm	3 September 2020	26 November 2020	Fall 2020	1 279 988	
17	12	Thursday 9:10 pm	4 March 2021	20 May 2021	Spring 2021	1 230 806	
18	12	Thursday 9:10 pm	2 September 2021	25 November 2021	Fall 2021	1 085 844	
19	12	Thursday 9:10 pm	3 March 2022	19 May 2022	Spring 2022	938 562	
20	12	Thursday 9:10 pm	1 September 2022	24 November 2022	Fall 2022	876 133	
21	12	Thursday 9:10 pm	2 March 2023	18 May 2023	Spring 2023	781 816	
22	12	Thursday 9:10 pm	7 September 2023	23 November 2023	Fall 2023	752 622	
23	12	Thursday 9:10 pm	29 February 2024	23 May 2024	Spring 2024	725 000	
24	12	Thursday 9:10 pm	12 September 2024	28 November 2024	Fall 2024	700 000	
25	12	Thursday 9:10 pm	6 March 2025	22 May 2025	Spring 2025	665 000	
26	12	Thursday 9:40 pm	11 September 2025	27 November 2025	Fall 2025	637 000	
