= Taniec z gwiazdami season 31 =

Polish TV show

Taniec z gwiazdami
- Season 31
- Hosted by: Krzysztof Ibisz; Paulina Sykut-Jeżyna
- Judges: Rafał Maserak; Ewa Kasprzyk; Tomasz Wygoda; Iwona Pavlović
- Celebrity winner: Gamou Fall
- Professional winner: Hanna Żudziewicz
- No. of episodes: 10

Release
- Original network: Polsat
- Original release: 1 March – 10 May 2026

Season chronology
- ← Previous; Season 30 Next → Season 32

The 31st season of Taniec z gwiazdami, the Polish edition of Dancing with the Stars, began on 1 March 2026. This is the eighteenth season aired on Polsat. Iwona Pavlović, Rafał Maserak, Ewa Kasprzyk and Tomasz Wygoda returned as judges. Krzysztof Ibisz and Paulina Sykut-Jeżyna reprised their role as hosts.

Michał Bartkiewicz, Jacek Jeschke, Albert Kosiński, Wojciech Kucina, Mieszko Masłowski, Klaudia Rąba, Izabela Skierska, Julia Suryś, Daria Syta, Magdalena Tarnowska, Stefano Terrazzino and Hanna Żudziewicz returned to the series.

On 10 May, Gamou Fall and his partner Hanna Żudziewicz were crowned the champions.

== Couples ==
Celebrity	Notability	Professional partner	Status	Source(s)
Małgorzata Potocka	Film and television actress	Mieszko Masłowski	Eliminated 1st on 8 March 2026	
Emilia Komarnicka	Actress and singer	Stefano Terrazzino	Eliminated 2nd on 15 March 2026	
Natalia „Natsu” Karczmarczyk	Social media personality	Wojciech Kucina	Eliminated 3rd on 29 March 2026	
Mateusz Pawłowski	Rodzinka.pl actor	Klaudia Rąba	Eliminated 4th on 29 March 2026	
Kamil Nożyński	Actor and rapper	Izabela Skierska	Eliminated 5th on 12 April 2026	
Izabella Miko	Actress, ballet dancer and model	Albert Kosiński	Eliminated 6th on 12 April 2026	
Kacper „Jasper” Porębski	Social media personality	Daria Syta; Julia Suryś (Week 7)	Eliminated 7th on 26 April 2026	
Piotr Kędzierski	Television & radio presenter	Magdalena Tarnowska; Hanna Żudziewicz (Week 7)	Withdrew on 3 May 2026	
Paulina Gałązka	Film and television actress	Michał Bartkiewicz; Jacek Jeschke (Week 7)	Runners-up on 10 May 2026	
Sebastian Fabijański	Actor and musician	Julia Suryś; Daria Syta (Week 7)	Runners-up on 10 May 2026	
Magdalena Boczarska	Film and television actress	Jacek Jeschke; Michał Bartkiewicz (Week 7)	Runners-up on 10 May 2026	
Gamou Fall	Actor & model	Hanna Żudziewicz; Magdalena Tarnowska (Week 7)	Winners on 10 May 2026	

== Scoring chart ==
Couple	Place	1	2	1+2	3	4	5	4+5	6	7	8	7+8	9	10
Gamou & Hanna	1	35	37	72	48	39	40†	79	40†	40+38=78	37+3=40	118	36+40=76	40+40=80†
Magdalena & Jacek	2	38†	38†	76†	45	40†	37	77	37	40+40=80†	40+4=44	124†	38+40=78	40+40=80†
Sebastian & Julia	2	36	30	66	48	34	38	72	40†	37+40=77	40+6=46†	123	40+40=80†	40+40=80†
Paulina & Michał	2	31	37	68	50†	36	40†	76	33	38+36=74	40+5=45	119	40+40=80†	40+40=80†
Piotr & Magdalena	5	24‡	23	47	31‡	26‡	18‡	44‡	24‡	25+32=57‡	33+1=34‡	91‡	31+33=64‡	
Kacper & Daria	6	25	31	56	34	26‡	31	57	29	36+33=69	35+2=37	106		
Izabella & Albert	7	37	33	70	48	40†	40†	80†	31					
Kamil & Izabela	8	27	26	53	32	32	34	66	—					
Mateusz & Klaudia	9	26	26	52	41	30	27	57						
Natalia & Wojciech	10	25	19‡	44‡	42	27	27	54						
Emilia & Stefano	11	34	37	71	39									
Małgorzata & Mieszko	12	24‡	20	44‡										

Red numbers indicate the lowest score for each week.
Green numbers indicate the highest score for each week.
indicates the couple eliminated that week.
indicates the couple that was eliminated but later returned to the competition.
indicates the returning couple that finished in the bottom two, three or four.
indicates the winning couple.
indicates the runner-up.
indicates the couple in third place.
indicates the couple in fourth place.
indicates the couple withdrew from the competition.

== Average score chart ==
This table only counts for dances scored on a 40-points scale.

Rank by average	Place	Couple	Total points	Number of dances	Average
1	2	Magdalena & Jacek	503	13	38.7
2	1	Gamou & Hanna	500	13	38.5
3	2	Sebastian & Julia	493	13	37.9
4	2	Paulina & Michał	491	13	37.8
5	7	Izabella & Albert	219	6	36.5
6	11	Emilia & Stefano	100	3	33.3
7	6	Kacper & Daria	270	9	30.0
8	8	Kamil & Izabela	141	5	28.2
9	9	Mateusz & Klaudia	140	5	28.0
10	5	Piotr & Magdalena	290	11	26.4
11	10	Natalia & Wojciech	130	5	26.0
12	12	Małgorzata & Mieszko	44	2	22.0

== Highest and lowest scoring performances ==
The best and worst performances in each dance according to the judges' 40-point scale:

Dance	Best dancer(s)	Highest score	Worst dancer(s)	Lowest score
Cha-cha-cha	Gamou Fall	38	Piotr Kędzierski	18
Viennese Waltz	Gamou Fall; Sebastian Fabijański	40	Mateusz Pawłowski; Piotr Kędzierski	26
Jive	Izabella Miko; Gamou Fall	40	Małgorzata Potocka	20
Quickstep	Paulina Gałązka	40	Piotr Kędzierski	21
Waltz	Magdalena Boczarska; Sebastian Fabijański; Gamou Fall; Paulina Gałązka	40	Piotr Kędzierski	23
Paso Doble	Gamou Fall; Paulina Gałązka	40	Mateusz Pawłowski	27
Rumba	Paulina Gałązka; Magdalena Boczarska; Sebastian Fabijański	40	Kacper „Jasper” Porębski	29
Tango	Paulina Gałązka; Sebastian Fabijański	40	Natalia „Natsu” Karczmarczyk	19
Foxtrot	Paulina Gałązka; Magdalena Boczarska	38	Emilia Komarnicka	29
Samba	Sebastian Fabijański	34	Kacper „Jasper” Porębski	24
Argentine Tango	Magdalena Boczarska	40	Gamou Fall	38
Salsa	Gamou Fall	39	Piotr Kędzierski	31
Disco	Sebastian Fabijański	38		
Hip-hop	Natalia „Natsu” Karczmarczyk	27		
Vogue	Izabella Miko	40		
Charleston	Sebastian Fabijański	40	Piotr Kędzierski	25
Broadway Jazz	Magdalena Boczarska	40		
Contemporary	Paulina Gałązka; Magdalena Boczarska	40		
Freestyle	Magdalena Boczarska; Sebastian Fabijański; Gamou Fall; Paulina Gałązka	40		

== Couples' highest and lowest scoring dances ==
According to the 40-point scale:

Couples	Highest scoring dance(s)	Lowest scoring dance(s)
Gamou & Hanna	Jive, Viennese Waltz (twice), Paso Doble, Waltz, Freestyle (40)	Quickstep (35)
Magdalena & Jacek	Argentine Tango, Broadway Jazz, Waltz (twice), Contemporary, Rumba, Freestyle (40)	Cha-cha-cha (35)
Sebastian & Julia	Viennese Waltz (twice), Tango, Charleston, Waltz, Rumba, Freestyle (40)	Tango (30)
Paulina & Michał	Rumba, Tango, Contemporary, Paso Doble, Quickstep, Waltz, Freestyle (40)	Cha-cha-cha (31)
Piotr & Magdalena	Paso Doble, Foxtrot (33)	Cha-cha-cha (18)
Kacper & Daria	Quickstep (36)	Samba (24)
Izabella & Albert	Jive, Vogue (40)	Tango (31)
Kamil & Izabela	Rumba (34)	Cha-cha-cha (22)
Mateusz & Klaudia	Samba (31)	Cha-cha-cha, Viennese Waltz (26)
Natalia & Wojciech	Salsa (32)	Tango (19)
Emilia & Stefano	Rumba (37)	Foxtrot (29)
Małgorzata & Mieszko	Cha-cha-cha (24)	Jive (20)

== Weekly scores ==
Unless indicated otherwise, individual judges scores in the charts below (given in parentheses) are listed in this order from left to right: Rafał Maserak, Ewa Kasprzyk, Tomasz Wygoda, Iwona Pavlović.

=== Week 1: Premiere ===
Running order

Couple	Score	Dance	Music
Paulina & Michał	31 (8,8,8,7)	Cha-cha-cha	"California Gurls"—Katy Perry
Kamil & Izabela	27 (7,8,6,6)	Viennese Waltz	"Lose Control"—Teddy Swims
Natalia & Wojciech	25 (7,7,6,5)	Jive	"Objection (Tango)"—Shakira
Gamou & Hanna	35 (8,10,9,8)	Quickstep	"Walking On Sunshine"—Katrina and the Waves
Małgorzata & Mieszko	24 (7,8,5,4)	Cha-cha-cha	"She Bangs"—Ricky Martin
Piotr & Magdalena	24 (6,9,6,3)	Jive	"Wolne duchy"—Męskie Granie Orkiestra
Mateusz & Klaudia	26 (7,9,6,4)	Cha-cha-cha	"Rodzinka.pl"—Feel
Emilia & Stefano	34 (8,9,9,8)	Waltz	"Ocalić od zapomnienia"—Jola Wolters
Kacper & Daria	25 (7,8,5,5)	Jive	"Shake It Off"—Taylor Swift
Izabella & Albert	37 (9,10,9,9)	Paso Doble	"Symphony No. 5"—Ludwig van Beethoven
Sebastian & Julia	36 (9,9,9,9)	Cha-cha-cha	"Bills"—LunchMoney Lewis
Magdalena & Jacek	38 (10,10,9,9)	Waltz	"Hello"—Lionel Richie

=== Week 2: Women's Day ===
Running order

Couple	Score	Dance	Music	Result
Emilia & Stefano	37 (9,10,9,9)	Rumba	"Jestem kobietą"—Edyta Górniak	Safe
Małgorzata & Mieszko	20 (6,7,4,3)	Jive	"Man! I Feel Like A Woman!"—Shania Twain	Eliminated
Mateusz & Klaudia	26 (7,7,6,6)	Viennese Waltz	"When a Man Loves a Woman"—Michael Bolton	Safe
Izabella & Albert	33 (8,9,8,8)	Rumba	"Girl on Fire"—Alicia Keys	Safe
Natalia & Wojciech	19 (6,6,5,2)	Tango	"Womanizer"—Britney Spears	Safe
Paulina & Michał	37 (10,10,9,8)	Viennese Waltz	"What's a Woman?"—Vaya Con Dios	Safe
Gamou & Hanna	37 (9,10,10,8)	Cha-cha-cha	"Oh, Pretty Woman"—Roy Orbison	Safe
Kacper & Daria	31 (8,9,7,7)	Waltz	"Jej portret"—Bogusław Mec	Safe
Magdalena & Jacek	38 (9,10,9,10)	Foxtrot	"W co mam wierzyć"—Mira Kubasińska & Breakout	Safe
Sebastian & Julia	30 (7,8,8,7)	Tango	"Only Girl (In the World)"—Rihanna	Safe
Kamil & Izabela	26 (7,8,6,5)	Quickstep	"Dziewczyna z Mercedesa"—Kamil Nożyński	Bottom two
Piotr & Magdalena	23 (7,7,5,4)	Waltz	"(You Make Me Feel Like) A Natural Woman"—Aretha Franklin	Safe

=== Week 3: Kayah Night ===
Individual judges scores in the charts below (given in parentheses) are listed in this order from left to right: Rafał Maserak, Ewa Kasprzyk, Kayah, Tomasz Wygoda, Iwona Pavlović.

Running order

Couple	Score	Dance	Music	Result
Kacper & Daria	34 (6,7,10,6,5)	Samba	"Ramię w ramię"—Kayah feat. Viki Gabor	Safe
Magdalena & Jacek	45 (8,10,10,9,8)	Cha-cha-cha	"Testosteron"—Kayah	Safe
Emilia & Stefano	39 (7,9,10,7,6)	Foxtrot	"Supermenka"—Kayah	Eliminated
Kamil & Izabela	32 (5,8,10,5,4)	Cha-cha-cha	"Proszę tańcz"—Kayah feat. Dawid Kwiatkowski	Bottom two
Sebastian & Julia	48 (9,10,10,9,10)	Paso Doble	"Po co"—Kayah feat. Idan Raichel	Safe
Paulina & Michał	50 (10,10,10,10,10)	Rumba	"Prócz ciebie, nic"—Kayah & Krzysztof Kiljański	Safe
Piotr & Magdalena	31 (5,8,10,5,3)	Quickstep	"Prawy do lewego"—Kayah	Safe
Gamou & Hanna	48 (10,10,10,9,9)	Argentine Tango	"Tabakiera"—Kayah & Goran Bregovic	Safe
Mateusz & Klaudia	41 (7,9,10,8,7)	Samba	"Śpij kochanie, śpij"—Kayah & Goran Bregovic	Safe
Izabella & Albert	48 (9,10,10,10,9)	Waltz	"Jestem kamieniem"—Kayah	Safe
Natalia & Wojciech	42 (8,9,10,8,7)	Salsa	"Fleciki"—Kayah	Safe

=== Week 4: Family Night ===
Running order

Couple	Score	Dance	Music
Gamou & Hanna (Olivier Drabek, nephew)	39 (9,10,10,10)	Salsa	"Nuevayol"—Bad Bunny
Kamil & Izabela (Antoni Nożyński, son)	32 (8,9,8,7)	Tango	"Ballada o Jasiu charakternym"—Witold Nożyński
Paulina & Michał (Eugenia Gałązka, mother)	36 (9,9,9,9)	Waltz	"Do Ciebie, mamo"—Violetta Villas
Natalia & Wojciech (Andrzej Karczmarczyk, father)	27 (7,7,7,6)	Viennese Waltz	"Dance With Me"—Bruno Mars
Magdalena & Jacek (Mateusz Banasiuk, boyfriend, contestant Season 15)	40 (10,10,10,10)	Argentine Tango	"Libertango"—Astor Piazzolla
Izabella & Albert (Aleksander Mikołajczak, father)	40 (10,10,10,10)	Jive	"Jailhouse Rock"—Elvis Presley
Piotr & Magdalena (Maria Narojek, mother)	26 (7,7,7,5)	Viennese Waltz	"Słucham cię w radiu co tydzień"—Anna Karwan
Kacper & Daria (Izabela Kalińska, mother)	26 (6,8,7,5)	Cha-cha-cha	"Americano"—Vito Bambino
Mateusz & Klaudia (Kornelia Gębura, girlfriend)	30 (8,9,7,6)	Waltz	"Let Her Go"—Passenger
Sebastian & Julia (Weronika Fabijańska, sister)	34 (8,10,8,8)	Samba	"Hey Mama"—Black Eyed Peas

=== Week 5: Guilty Pleasures Night ===
Running order

Couple	Score	Dance	Music	Result
Sebastian & Julia	38 (9,10,10,9)	Disco	"Halo tu Londyn"—Weekend	Safe
Gamou & Hanna	40 (10,10,10,10)	Jive	"Dżaga"—Virgin	Safe
Natalia & Wojciech	27 (7,7,7,6)	Hip-hop	"Falochrony"—Roksana Węgiel & Mata	Eliminated
Paulina & Michał	40 (10,10,10,10)	Tango	"Ev'ry Night"—Mandaryna	Safe
Izabella & Albert	40 (10,10,10,10)	Vogue	"Gonna Make You Sweat"—C+C Music Factory feat. F. Williams	Bottom four
Kamil & Izabela	34 (8,9,9,8)	Rumba	"You're My Heart, You're My Soul"—Modern Talking	Bottom four
Magdalena & Jacek	37 (9,10,9,9)	Paso Doble	"Poison"—Alice Cooper	Safe
Kacper & Daria	31 (8,8,8,7)	Viennese Waltz	"Lover"—Taylor Swift	Safe
Piotr & Magdalena	18 (5,6,5,2)	Cha-cha-cha	"Kolorowe sny"—Just 5	Safe
Mateusz & Klaudia	27 (7,8,6,6)	Paso Doble	"Star Wars Main Theme"—John Williams	Eliminated

=== Week 6: Influencers Night ===
Dance-off performances

Couple	Dance	Music	Result
Izabella & Albert	Foxtrot	"Back to Black"—Amy Winehouse	Safe
Kamil & Izabela	Foxtrot	"Back to Black"—Amy Winehouse	Eliminated

Judges' votes to save

- Maserak: Izabella & Albert
- Kasprzyk: Kamil & Izabela
- Wygoda: Kamil & Izabela
- Pavlović: Izabella & Albert

Running order

Couple	Score	Dance	Music	Supportive influencer	Result
Paulina & Michał	33 (8,9,8,8)	Samba	"Lush Life"—Zara Larsson	Ewa Chodakowska	Safe
Kacper & Daria	29 (8,8,7,6)	Rumba	"Ain't No Sunshine"—Bill Withers	Piotr Charaziński (Charazinsky)	Safe
Gamou & Hanna	40 (10,10,10,10)	Viennese Waltz	"Die with a Smile"—Bruno Mars & Lady Gaga	Jessica Mercedes	Safe
Magdalena & Jacek	37 (9,10,9,9)	Jive	"Candyman"—Christina Aguilera	Zoja Skubis	Safe
Piotr & Magdalena	24 (6,7,6,5)	Tango	"Bad Romance"—Lady Gaga	Michał Marszał	Safe
Izabella & Albert	31 (8,8,8,7)	Tango	"Training Season"—Dua Lipa	Kamil Szymczak	Eliminated
Sebastian & Julia	40 (10,10,10,10)	Viennese Waltz	"Snowman"—Sia	Krzysztof Stanowski	Safe
Kamil & Izabela	N/A	Salsa	"Empire State of Mind"—Alicia Keys	—	

=== Week 7: Switch-Up Night ===
Running order

Couple	Score	Dance	Music
Kacper & Daria (Julia Suryś)	36 (9,9,9,9)	Quickstep	"Nic do stracenia"—Mrozu & Sound'n'Grace
Kacper & Daria (Julia Suryś)	33 (8,10,8,7)	Jive	"Halo"—Beyoncé
Piotr & Magdalena (Hanna Żudziewicz)	25 (6,8,6,5)	Charleston	"We No Speak Americano"—Yolanda Be Cool & DCUP
Piotr & Magdalena (Hanna Żudziewicz)	32 (8,9,8,7)	Waltz	"Nothing Compares 2 U"—Sinéad O'Connor
Sebastian & Julia (Daria Syta)	37 (9,10,9,9)	Jive	"Tańcz głupia"—Margaret
Sebastian & Julia (Daria Syta)	40 (10,10,10,10)	Tango	"Hej hej!"—Daria Zawiałow
Magdalena & Jacek (Michał Bartkiewicz)	40 (10,10,10,10)	Broadway Jazz	"Fever"—Peggy Lee
Magdalena & Jacek (Michał Bartkiewicz)	40 (10,10,10,10)	Waltz	"When We Were Young"—Adele
Gamou & Hanna (Magdalena Tarnowska)	40 (10,10,10,10)	Paso Doble	"Malagueña"—Ernesto Lecuona
Gamou & Hanna (Magdalena Tarnowska)	38 (10,10,10,8)	Cha-cha-cha	"Crush"—Jennifer Paige
Paulina & Michał (Jacek Jeschke)	38 (10,10,10,8)	Foxtrot	"L-O-V-E"—Nat King Cole
Paulina & Michał (Jacek Jeschke)	36 (9,10,9,8)	Cha-cha-cha	"Treasure"—Bruno Mars

=== Week 8: Instant Dance Challenge ===
Individual judges scores in the charts below (given in parentheses) are listed in this order from left to right: Rafał Maserak, Agata Kulesza, Tomasz Wygoda, Iwona Pavlović.

Running order

Couple	Score	Dance	Music	Result
Sebastian & Julia	40 (10,10,10,10)	Charleston	"That Man"—Caro Emerald	Safe
Sebastian & Julia	6	Paso Doble	"Eye of the Tiger"—Survivor	Safe
Kacper & Daria	35 (8,10,9,8)	Paso Doble	"Wrecking Ball"—Miley Cyrus	Eliminated
Kacper & Daria	2	Cha-cha-cha	"Sway"—Michael Bublé	Eliminated
Gamou & Hanna	37 (10,10,9,8)	Foxtrot	"Feeling Good"—Nina Simone	Safe
Gamou & Hanna	3	Quickstep	"Nah Neh Nah"—Vaya Con Dios	Safe
Paulina & Michał	40 (10,10,10,10)	Contemporary	"Comptine d'un autre été, l'après-midi"—Yann Tiersen	Bottom two
Paulina & Michał	5	Rumba	"Purple Rain"—Prince	Bottom two
Piotr & Magdalena	33 (8,10,8,7)	Paso Doble	"Freed from Desire"—Gala	Safe
Piotr & Magdalena	1	Cha-cha-cha	"Smooth Operator"—Sade	Safe
Magdalena & Jacek	40 (10,10,10,10)	Contemporary	"Trudno jest być sobą"—Daria ze Śląska	Safe
Magdalena & Jacek	4	Foxtrot	"Cheek to Cheek"—Fred Astaire	Safe

=== Week 9: The Semifinals ===
Running order

Couple	Score	Dance	Music	Result
Gamou & Hanna	36 (9,10,9,8)	Rumba	"What's Love Got to Do with It"—Tina Turner	Safe
Gamou & Hanna	40 (10,10,10,10)	Waltz	"I Dreamed a Dream"—Anne Hathaway (from Les Misérables)	Safe
Magdalena & Jacek	38 (9,10,10,9)	Viennese Waltz	"Litania"—Edyta Górniak (from Metro)	Bottom two
Magdalena & Jacek	40 (10,10,10,10)	Rumba	"Zawsze tam, gdzie ty"—Lady Pank	Bottom two
Paulina & Michał	40 (10,10,10,10)	Paso Doble	"El Conquistador"—José Esparza	Bottom two
Paulina & Michał	40 (10,10,10,10)	Quickstep	"Dancing Queen"—ABBA (from Mamma Mia!)	Bottom two
Sebastian & Julia	40 (10,10,10,10)	Waltz	"Can You Feel the Love Tonight"—Elton John (from The Lion King)	Safe
Sebastian & Julia	40 (10,10,10,10)	Rumba	"Shape of My Heart"—Sting	Safe
Piotr & Magdalena	31 (8,8,8,7)	Salsa	"Cambio Dolor"—Natalia Oreiro	Withdrew
Piotr & Magdalena	33 (9,9,8,7)	Foxtrot	"All That Jazz"—Liza Minnelli (from Chicago)	Withdrew

Dance-off performances

Couple	Dance	Music	Result
Paulina & Michał	Cha-cha-cha	"Let's Get Loud"—Jennifer Lopez	Safe
Magdalena & Jacek	Cha-cha-cha	"Let's Get Loud"—Jennifer Lopez	Safe

=== Week 10: The Finals ===
Running order

Couple	Score	Dance	Music	Result
Magdalena & Jacek	40 (10,10,10,10)	Waltz	"Imagine"—John Lennon	Runners-up
Magdalena & Jacek	40 (10,10,10,10)	Freestyle	"Arrival of The Birds"—The Cinematic Orchestra	Runners-up
Sebastian & Julia	40 (10,10,10,10)	Viennese Waltz	"Crazy"—Aerosmith	Runners-up
Sebastian & Julia	40 (10,10,10,10)	Freestyle	"Tańcz" and "Listopad"—Sebastian Fabijański & Zalucki	Runners-up
Gamou & Hanna	40 (10,10,10,10)	Viennese Waltz	"I Have Nothing"—Whitney Houston	Winners
Gamou & Hanna	40 (10,10,10,10)	Freestyle	"I Ciebie też, bardzo"—Daria Zawiałow, Dawid Podsiadło & Vito Bambino	Winners
Paulina & Michał	40 (10,10,10,10)	Waltz	"Against All Odds (Take a Look at Me Now)"—Phil Collins	Runners-up
Paulina & Michał	40 (10,10,10,10)	Freestyle	"The Danish Girl"—Alexandre Desplat	Runners-up

Other Dances

Couple	Dance	Music
Piotr & Magdalena	Freestyle	"Night Fever" — Bee Gees
Kacper & Daria	Freestyle	"Night Fever" — Bee Gees
Izabella & Albert	Freestyle	"Night Fever" — Bee Gees
Kamil & Izabela	Freestyle	"Night Fever" — Bee Gees
Mateusz & Klaudia	Freestyle	"Night Fever" — Bee Gees
Natalia & Wojciech	Freestyle	"Night Fever" — Bee Gees
Emilia & Stefano	Freestyle	"Night Fever" — Bee Gees
Małgorzata & Mieszko	Freestyle	"Night Fever" — Bee Gees

== Dance chart ==
The celebrities and professional partners danced one of these routines for each corresponding week:

- Week 1 (Premiere): Cha-cha-cha, Viennese Waltz, Jive, Quickstep, Waltz, Paso Doble
- Week 2 (Women's Day): One unlearned dance (introducing Tango, Rumba, Foxtrot)
- Week 3 (Kayah Night): One unlearned dance (introducing Argentine Tango, Salsa, Samba)
- Week 4 (Family Night): One unlearned dance
- Week 5 (Guilty Pleasures Night): One unlearned dance (introducing Hip-hop, Vogue, Disco)
- Week 6 (Influencers Night): One unlearned dance
- Week 7 (Switch-Up Night): One unlearned dance and one repeated dance (introducing Charleston, Broadway Jazz)
- Week 8 (Instant Dance Challenge): One unlearned dance and one instant repeated dance (introducing Contemporary)
- Week 9 (The Semifinals): Two unlearned dances
- Week 10 (The Finals): Viennese Waltz or Waltz and Freestyle

Couple	1	2	3	4	5	6	7		8		9		10	
Gamou & Hanna	Quickstep	Cha-cha-cha	Argentine Tango	Salsa	Jive	Viennese Waltz	Paso Doble	Cha-cha-cha	Foxtrot	Quickstep	Rumba	Waltz	Viennese Waltz	Freestyle
Magdalena & Jacek	Waltz	Foxtrot	Cha-cha-cha	Argentine Tango	Paso Doble	Jive	Broadway Jazz	Waltz	Contemporary	Foxtrot	Viennese Waltz	Rumba	Waltz	Freestyle
Sebastian & Julia	Cha-cha-cha	Tango	Paso Doble	Samba	Disco	Viennese Waltz	Jive	Tango	Charleston	Paso Doble	Waltz	Rumba	Viennese Waltz	Freestyle
Paulina & Michał	Cha-cha-cha	Viennese Waltz	Rumba	Waltz	Tango	Samba	Foxtrot	Cha-cha-cha	Contemporary	Rumba	Paso Doble	Quickstep	Waltz	Freestyle
Piotr & Magdalena	Jive	Waltz	Quickstep	Viennese Waltz	Cha-cha-cha	Tango	Charleston	Waltz	Paso Doble	Cha-cha-cha	Salsa	Foxtrot		Freestyle
Kacper & Daria	Jive	Waltz	Samba	Cha-cha-cha	Viennese Waltz	Rumba	Quickstep	Jive	Paso Doble	Cha-cha-cha				Freestyle
Izabella & Albert	Paso Doble	Rumba	Waltz	Jive	Vogue	Tango								Freestyle
Kamil & Izabela	Viennese Waltz	Quickstep	Cha-cha-cha	Tango	Rumba	Salsa								Freestyle
Mateusz & Klaudia	Cha-cha-cha	Viennese Waltz	Samba	Waltz	Paso Doble									Freestyle
Natalia & Wojciech	Jive	Tango	Salsa	Viennese Waltz	Hip-hop									Freestyle
Emilia & Stefano	Waltz	Rumba	Foxtrot											Freestyle
Małgorzata & Mieszko	Cha-cha-cha	Jive												Freestyle

Highest scoring dance
Lowest scoring dance
Performed, but not scored
Bonus points
Not performed due to withdrawal
Gained bonus points for winning this dance-off
Gained no bonus points for losing this dance-off

== Guest performances ==
Date	Artist(s)	Song(s)	Dancers
1 March 2026	Tomasz Szymuś's Orchestra	"Let's Dance"	Collective Group and all couples
8 March 2026	Ania Rusowicz	"Być kobietą"	All female celebrities and dancers
8 March 2026	Ania Rusowicz	"W co mam wierzyć"	Magdalena Boczarska & Jacek Jeschke
15 March 2026	Kayah	"Na językach"	Collective Group and all couples
22 March 2026	Tomasz Szymuś's Orchestra	"Opowiadaj mi tak"	All professional dancers and Collective Group
29 March 2026	Tomasz Szymuś's Orchestra	"You Spin Me Round"	Collective Group
29 March 2026	Bartek Wrona	"Kolorowe sny"	Piotr Kędzierski & Magdalena Tarnowska
3 May 2026	Kaeyra	"Sour"	All professional dancers and Collective Group
10 May 2026	Julia Wieniawa	"Kocham"	

== Rating figures ==
Date	Episode	Official rating 4+	Share 4+	Official rating 16–49	Share 16–49	Official rating 16–59	Share 16–59
1 March 2026	1						
8 March 2026	2						
15 March 2026	3						
22 March 2026	4						
29 March 2026	5						
12 April 2026	6						
19 April 2026	7						
26 April 2026	8						
3 May 2026	9						
10 May 2026	10						
Average	Spring 2026						
