= Rusowicz =

Rusowicz is a Polish surname. Notable people with the surname include:

- Ada Rusowicz (1944–1991), Polish singer
- Ania Rusowicz (born 1983), Polish singer, daughter of Ada
