= Taniec z gwiazdami season 32 =

Polish TV show

Taniec z gwiazdami
- Season 32
- Hosted by: Krzysztof Ibisz; Paulina Sykut-Jeżyna
- Judges: Tomasz Wygoda; Julia Wieniawa; Rafał Maserak; Iwona Pavlović
- No. of episodes: 12

Release
- Original network: Polsat
- Original release: 6 September – 29 November 2026

Season chronology
- ← Previous; Season 31

The 32th season of Taniec z gwiazdami, the Polish edition of Dancing with the Stars, the Polish edition of Dancing with the Stars, began in 6 September 2026. This was the nineteenth season aired on Polsat. Krzysztof Ibisz and Paulina Sykut-Jeżyna reprised their role as hosts. Iwona Pavlović, Rafał Maserak, and Tomasz Wygoda returned as judges while Ewa Kasprzyk was replaced by Julia Wieniawa as new judge.

Michał Bartkiewicz, Sara Janicka, Michał Kassin, Kamil Kuroczko, Roman Osadchiy, Izabela Skierska, Julia Suryś-Stromecka, Daria Syta-Grobelna and Magdalena Tarnowska returned to the series. New dancers Estelle François, Kacper Rutka and Krystian Rzymkiewicz take part in the program.

Initially, singer Andrzej Rosiewicz was scheduled to participate in this edition. However, he was later forced to withdraw for health reasons before training began.

== Couples ==
| Celebrity | Notability | Professional partner | Status | Source(s) |
|---|---|---|---|---|
| Monika Borzym | Jazz singer | Michał Kassin | Eliminated 1st on 13 September 2026 | |
| Matteo Brunetti | Chef & MasterChef semi-finalist | Izabela Skierska | Eliminated 2nd on 20 September 2026 | |
| Kaeyra | Singer-songwriter and American Idol contestant | Kacper Rutka | Eliminated 3rd on 27 September 2026 | |
| Joanna Jędrzejczyk | MMA & Muay Thai fighter and kickboxer | Kamil Kuroczko | Eliminated 4th on 11 October 2026 | |
| Krzysztof Kwiatkowski | M jak miłość actor | Sara Janicka | Eliminated 5th on 18 October 2026 | |
| Dominik Smaruj | Pierwsza miłość actor | Magdalena Tarnowska | Eliminated 6th on 25 October 2026 | |
| Jasper Sołtysiewicz | Barwy szczęścia actor | Daria Syta-Grobelna | Eliminated 7th on 15 November 2026 | |
| Piotr „Guma” Gumulec | Comedian | Julia Suryś-Stromecka | Eliminated 8th on 22 November 2026 | |
| Mandaryna | Singer, hip-hop dancer and actress | Krystian Rzymkiewicz | Participating | |
| Helena Englert | Actress and singer | Roman Osadchiy | Participating | |
| Dominik Rupiński | Social media personality | Estelle François | Participating | |
| Izabela Kuna | Film & television actress | Michał Bartkiewicz | Participating | |

== Scoring chart ==
| Couple | Place | 1 | 2 | 1+2 | 3 | 4 | 5 | 6 | 5+6 | 7 | 8 | 9 | 10 | 9+10 | 11 | 12 |
|---|---|---|---|---|---|---|---|---|---|---|---|---|---|---|---|---|
| Mandaryna & Krystian | | 28† | 22 | 50 | 39 | 31 | 40† | 34 | 74 | 45 | 36 | 40+36=76 | 36+38=74 | 150 | 6+38=44 | |
| Helena & Roman | | 28† | 30 | 58† | 41† | 35† | 38 | 38 | 76 | 46 | 38 | 40+38=78† | 40+40=80† | 158† | 8+40=48 | |
| Dominik & Estelle | | 26 | 30 | 56 | 35 | 28 | 34 | 39 | 73 | 50† | 39† | 37+38=75 | 29+34=63‡ | 138 | 10+40=50† | |
| Izabela & Michał | | 23 | 31† | 54 | 35 | 34 | 35 | 40† | 75 | 37‡ | 39† | 38+36=74 | 40+40=80† | 154 | 4+37=41 | |
| Piotr & Julia | 5 | 14‡ | 23 | 37‡ | 28‡ | 28 | 37 | 22‡ | 59‡ | 46 | - | 27+34=61‡ | 35+40=75 | 136 | 2+33=35‡ | |
| Jasper & Daria | 6 | 18 | 25 | 43 | 40 | 26 | 35 | 29 | 64 | 37‡ | 33 | 38+30=68 | 28+36=64 | 132‡ | | |
| Dominik & Magdalena | 7 | 25 | 24 | 49 | 36 | 29 | 35 | 25 | 60 | 48 | 31‡ | | | | | |
| Krzysztof & Sara | 8 | 23 | 25 | 48 | 35 | 22 | 38 | 40† | 78† | 42 | | | | | | |
| Joanna & Kamil | 9 | 22 | 22 | 44 | 37 | 26 | 33‡ | 33 | 66 | | | | | | | |
| Kaeyra & Kacper | 10 | 26 | 22 | 48 | 37 | 20‡ | | | | | | | | | | |
| Matteo & Izabela | 11 | 22 | 26 | 48 | 30 | | | | | | | | | | | |
| Monika & Michał | 12 | 19 | 19‡ | 38 | | | | | | | | | | | | |

Red numbers indicate the lowest score for each week.
Green numbers indicate the highest score for each week.
indicates the couple eliminated that week.
indicates the couple that was eliminated but later returned to the competition.
indicates the returning couple that finished in the bottom two, three or four.
indicates the couple was immune from elimination.
indicates the winning couple.
indicates the runner-up.
indicates the couple in third place.
indicates the couple in fourth place.

== Average score chart ==
This table only counts for dances scored on a 40-points scale.

| Rank by average | Place | Couple | Total points | Number of dances | Average |
|---|---|---|---|---|---|
| 1 | | Helena & Roman | 472 | 13 | 36.3 |
| 2 | | Izabela & Michał | 445 | 13 | 34.2 |
| 3 | | Mandaryna & Krystian | 443 | 13 | 34.1 |
| 4 | | Dominik & Estelle | 440 | 13 | 33.9 |
| 5 | 6 | Jasper & Daria | 355 | 12 | 29.6 |
| 6 | 8 | Krzysztof & Sara | 205 | 7 | 29.3 |
| 7 | 7 | Dominik & Magdalena | 233 | 8 | 29.1 |
| 8 | 5 | Piotr & Julia | 347 | 12 | 28.9 |
| 9 | 9 | Joanna & Kamil | 163 | 6 | 27.2 |
| 10 | 10 | Kaeyra & Kacper | 95 | 4 | 23.8 |
| 11 | 11 | Matteo & Izabela | 68 | 3 | 22.7 |
| 12 | 12 | Monika & Michał | 38 | 2 | 19.0 |

== Highest and lowest scoring performances ==
The best and worst performances in each dance according to the judges' 40-point scale:

| Dance | Best dancer(s) | Highest score | Worst dancer(s) | Lowest score |
|---|---|---|---|---|
| Cha-cha-cha | Helena Englert | 35 | Piotr „Guma” Gumulec | 14 |
| Viennese Waltz | Helena Englert | 40 | Joanna Jędrzejczyk | 22 |
| Jive | Dominik Rupiński | 40 | Monika Borzym | 19 |
| Samba | Helena Englert | 40 | Krzysztof Kwiatkowski; Piotr „Guma” Gumulec | 22 |
| Foxtrot | Izabela Kuna | 40 | Dominik Smaruj | 25 |
| Argentine Tango | Izabela Kuna; Helena Englert | 40 | Monika Borzym | 19 |
| Quickstep | Krzysztof Kwiatkowski | 32 | Jasper Sołtysiewicz | 18 |
| Tango | Piotr „Guma” Gumulec | 40 | Dominik Rupiński | 26 |
| Waltz | Piotr „Guma” Gumulec | 36 | Mandaryna | 22 |
| Rumba | Dominik Rupiński | 39 | Krzysztof Kwiatkowski | 25 |
| Salsa | Dominik Rupiński | 39 | Piotr „Guma” Gumulec | 18 |
| Paso Doble | Krzysztof Kwiatkowski; Helena Englert; Dominik Rupiński | 40 | Jasper Sołtysiewicz | 26 |
| Contemporary | Dominik Smaruj | 38 | Dominik Rupiński | 28 |
| Charleston | Jasper Sołtysiewicz | 38 | Jasper Sołtysiewicz; Piotr „Guma” Gumulec | 35 |
| Funk | Mandaryna | 40 | | |
| Medley | Helena Englert | 38 | | |
| Polish Dance | Mandaryna (Mazurek) | 40 | Jasper Sołtysiewicz (Csárdás) | 30 |
| Freestyle | | | | |

== Couples' highest and lowest scoring dances ==
According to the 40-point scale:

| Couples | Highest scoring dance(s) | Lowest scoring dance(s) |
|---|---|---|
| Mandaryna & Krystian | Funk & Mazurek (40) | Waltz (22) |
| Helena & Roman | Viennese Waltz, Argentine Tango, Samba & Paso Doble (40) | Samba (28) |
| Dominik & Estelle | Jive & Paso Doble (40) | Tango & Foxtrot (26) |
| Izabela & Michał | Argentine Tango & Foxtrot (40) | Cha-cha-cha (23) |
| Piotr & Julia | Tango (40) | Cha-cha-cha (14) |
| Jasper & Daria | Charleston (38) | Quickstep (18) |
| Dominik & Magdalena | Contemporary (38) | Cha-cha-cha (24) |
| Krzysztof & Sara | Paso Doble (40) | Samba (22) |
| Joanna & Kamil | Jive & Tango (33) | Viennese Waltz & Cha-cha-cha (22) |
| Kaeyra & Kacper | Quickstep (27) | Cha-cha-cha (20) |
| Matteo & Izabela | Waltz (26) | Cha-cha-cha (20) |
| Monika & Michał | Argentine Tango & Jive (19) | Argentine Tango & Jive (19) |

== Weekly scores ==
Unless indicated otherwise, individual judges scores in the charts below (given in parentheses) are listed in this order from left to right: Tomasz Wygoda, Julia Wieniawa, Rafał Maserak, Iwona Pavlović.

=== Week 1: Season Premiere (Italian Week) ===
Running order

| Couple | Score | Dance | Music |
|---|---|---|---|
| Krzysztof & Sara | 23 (6,7,5,5) | Cha-cha-cha | "Mambo Italiano"—Dean Martin |
| Joanna & Kamil | 22 (5,6,6,5) | Viennese Waltz | "Ti amo"—Umberto Tozzi |
| Matteo & Izabela | 22 (5,7,6,4) | Jive | "Buona Sera, Signorina"—Louis Prima |
| Helena & Roman | 28 (7,8,7,6) | Samba | "Quando Quando Quando"—Tony Renis & Alberto Testa |
| Kaeyra & Kacper | 26 (6,8,6,6) | Foxtrot | "Felicità"—Al Bano & Romina Power |
| Piotr & Julia | 14 (4,5,3,2) | Cha-cha-cha | "Espresso Macchiato"—Tommy Cash |
| Monika & Michał | 19 (5,6,4,4) | Argentine Tango | "Love Theme from The Godfather"—Nino Rota |
| Dominik & Magdalena | 25 (6,8,6,5) | Foxtrot | "L'Italiano"—Toto Cutugno |
| Izabela & Michał | 23 (6,7,5,5) | Cha-cha-cha | "Baila morena"—Zucchero |
| Jasper & Daria | 18 (5,6,4,3) | Quickstep | "We No Speak Americano"—Yolanda Be Cool & DCUP |
| Dominik & Estelle | 26 (7,7,6,6) | Tango | "Italodisco"—The Kolors |
| Mandaryna & Krystian | 28 (7,8,7,6) | Samba | "Volare"—Domenico Modugno |

=== Week 2: Black Mamba Academy ===
Running order

| Couple | Score | Dance | Music | Result |
|---|---|---|---|---|
| Dominik & Estelle | 30 (7,9,7,7) | Cha-cha-cha | "A Night like This"—Caro Emerald | Safe |
| Joanna & Kamil | 22 (5,7,5,5) | Cha-cha-cha | "Dance the Night"—Dua Lipa | Bottom two |
| Dominik & Magdalena | 24 (6,8,5,5) | Cha-cha-cha | "Kokomo"—The Beach Boys | Safe |
| Krzysztof & Sara | 25 (5,8,6,6) | Viennese Waltz | "Love on the Brain"—Rihanna | Safe |
| Helena & Roman | 30 (7,9,7,7) | Viennese Waltz | "Stop!"—Sam Brown | Safe |
| Piotr & Julia | 23 (5,7,6,5) | Viennese Waltz | "Weź nie pytaj"—Paweł Domagała | Safe |
| Kaeyra & Kacper | 22 (6,7,5,4) | Jive | "Proud Mary"—Ike & Tina Turner | Safe |
| Monika & Michał | 19 (5,7,4,3) | Jive | "All About That Bass"—Meghan Trainor | Eliminated |
| Jasper & Daria | 25 (6,7,6,6) | Jive | "Sex on Fire"—Kings of Leon | Safe |
| Matteo & Izabela | 26 (6,8,6,6) | Waltz | "Oczarowanie"—Zbigniew Wodecki | Safe |
| Mandaryna & Krystian | 22 (6,7,5,4) | Waltz | "What the World Needs Now Is Love"—Jackie DeShannon | Safe |
| Izabela & Michał | 31 (7,9,8,7) | Waltz | "When I Need You"—Leo Sayer | Safe |

=== Week 3: Maryla Night ===
Individual judges scores in the charts below (given in parentheses) are listed in this order from left to right: Tomasz Wygoda, Julia Wieniawa, Maryla Rodowicz, Rafał Maserak, Iwona Pavlović.

Running order

| Couple | Score | Dance | Music | Result |
|---|---|---|---|---|
| Matteo & Izabela | 30 (5,7,10,4,4) | Cha-cha-cha | "Remedium"—Maryla Rodowicz | Eliminated |
| Krzysztof & Sara | 35 (6,7,10,6,6) | Rumba | "Wielka woda"—Maryla Rodowicz | Safe |
| Izabela & Michał | 35 (6,7,10,6,6) | Samba | "Małgośka"—Maryla Rodowicz | Safe |
| Kaeyra & Kacper | 37 (6,8,10,7,6) | Quickstep | "Do łezki łezka"—Maryla Rodowicz | Safe |
| Piotr & Julia | 28 (4,6,10,5,3) | Salsa | "Ballada wagonowa"—Maryla Rodowicz | Bottom two |
| Joanna & Kamil | 37 (6,8,10,7,6) | Foxtrot | "Ludzkie gadanie"—Maryla Rodowicz | Safe |
| Mandaryna & Krystian | 39 (6,9,10,7,7) | Rumba | "Wariatka tańczy"—Maryla Rodowicz | Safe |
| Helena & Roman | 41 (7,9,10,8,7) | Jive | "Sing-sing"—Maryla Rodowicz | Safe |
| Dominik & Estelle | 35 (6,9,9,6,5) | Foxtrot | "Gaj"—Maryla Rodowicz feat. Marek Grechuta | Safe |
| Jasper & Daria | 40 (7,9,10,7,7) | Tango | "Tango na głos, orkiestrę i jeszcze jeden głos"—Maryla Rodowicz | Safe |
| Dominik & Magdalena | 36 (6,9,10,6,5) | Viennese Waltz | "Niech żyje bal"—Maryla Rodowicz | Safe |

=== Week 4: Time Machine Night ===
Running order

| Couple | Score | Dance | Music | Result |
|---|---|---|---|---|
| Kaeyra & Kacper | 20 (5,7,4,4) | Cha-cha-cha | "Señorita"—Shawn Mendes & Camila Cabello | Eliminated |
| Jasper & Daria | 26 (6,8,6,6) | Paso Doble | "Wrecking Ball"—Miley Cyrus | Safe |
| Piotr & Julia | 28 (6,8,7,7) | Rumba | "Miłość miłość"—Krzysztof Zalewski | Safe |
| Dominik & Magdalena | 29 (7,9,7,6) | Jive | "Candyman"—Christina Aguilera | Safe |
| Krzysztof & Sara | 22 (6,7,5,4) | Samba | "Za Tobą pójdę jak na bal"—Krzysztof Krawczyk | Safe |
| Izabela & Michał | 34 (8,10,8,8) | Rumba | "Tuyo"—Rodrigo Amarante | Safe |
| Joanna & Kamil | 26 (6,8,6,6) | Salsa | "Despacito"—Luis Fonsi ft. Daddy Yankee | Bottom two |
| Helena & Roman | 35 (8,10,9,8) | Cha-cha-cha | "Training Season"—Dua Lipa | Safe |
| Mandaryna & Krystian | 31 (8,9,7,7) | Paso Doble | "Biała armia"—Bajm | Safe |
| Dominik & Estelle | 28 (7,7,7,7) | Contemporary | "Wyglądasz tak pięknie"—Sobel | Safe |

=== Week 5: Family Night ===
Running order

| Couple | Score | Dance | Music |
|---|---|---|---|
| Jasper & Daria (Kalina Kwiatkowska, sister) | 35 (9,10,8,8) | Charleston | "Ale jazz!"—Sanah & Vito Bambino |
| Joanna & Kamil (Krzysztof and Ignacy Ostrowscy, brother-in-law and nephew) | 33 (9,9,8,7) | Jive | "La Bamba"—Los Lobos |
| Mandaryna & Krystian (Xavier Wiśniewski, son) | 40 (10,10,10,10) | Funk | "Zawsze z Tobą chciałbym być"—Ich Troje |
| Krzysztof & Sara (Zofia Nowakowska, partner) | 38 (10,10,9,9) | Salsa | "Bailando"—Enrique Iglesias, Gente De Zona & Descemer Bueno |
| Dominik & Magdalena (Urszula Kobiela, wife) | 35 (9,10,8,8) | Rumba | "Somethin' Stupid"—Robbie Williams & Nicole Kidman |
| Izabela & Michał (Nadia Kurzelewska, daughter) | 35 (9,9,8,9) | Salsa | "Carnaval de Sao Vicente"—Cesária Évora |
| Dominik & Estelle (Aldona Kozicka, grandmother) | 34 (9,10,8,7) | Viennese Waltz | "Tylko mnie poproś do tańca"—Anna Jantar |
| Piotr & Julia (Bartosz Gumulec, brother) | 37 (9,10,9,9) | Tango | "Takie tango"—Budka Suflera |
| Helena & Roman (Jan Englert, father) | 38 (10,10,9,9) | Viennese Waltz; Rock and Roll | "Trędowata"—Wojciech Kilar "Rock Around the Clock"—Bill Haley & His Comets |

=== Week 6: Latin Night ===
Running order

| Couple | Score | Dance | Music | Result |
|---|---|---|---|---|
| Dominik & Magdalena | 25 (7,7,6,5) | Samba | "Cambio Dolor"—Natalia Oreiro | Safe |
| Mandaryna & Krystian | 34 (8,9,9,8) | Cha-cha-cha | "Let's Get Loud"—Jennifer Lopez | Safe |
| Piotr & Julia | 22 (6,7,5,4) | Samba | "Macarena"—Los Del Rio | Safe |
| Joanna & Kamil | 33 (8,10,8,7) | Tango | "Objection (Tango)"—Shakira | Eliminated |
| Helena & Roman | 38 (9,10,9,10) | Salsa | "La Bomba"—Ricky Martin | Safe |
| Krzysztof & Sara | 40 (10,10,10,10) | Paso Doble | "El Gato Montes"—Manuel Penella | Safe |
| Dominik & Estelle | 39 (10,10,10,9) | Salsa | "Nuevayol"—Bad Bunny | Safe |
| Izabela & Michał | 40 (10,10,10,10) | Argentine Tango | "La cumparsita"—Gerardo Matos Rodríguez | Safe |
| Jasper & Daria | 29 (7,8,8,6) | Rumba | "Hero"—Enrique Iglesias | Bottom two |

=== Week 7: Disney Night ===
Individual judges scores in the charts below (given in parentheses) are listed in this order from left to right: Tomasz Wygoda, Julia Wieniawa, Edyta Górniak, Rafał Maserak, Iwona Pavlović.

Running order

| Couple | Score | Dance | Music | Animated film | Result |
|---|---|---|---|---|---|
| Helena & Roman | 46 (9,9,10,9,9) | Contemporary | "Mam tę moc" | Frozen | Safe |
| Krzysztof & Sara | 42 (8,8,10,8,8) | Quickstep | "I Wan’na Be Like You (The Monkey Song)" | The Jungle Book | Eliminated |
| Jasper & Daria | 37 (7,8,10,7,5) | Samba | "Trashin' the Camp" | Tarzan | Safe |
| Mandaryna & Krystian | 45 (9,10,10,9,7) | Viennese Waltz | "Kiedyś we śnie" | Sleeping Beauty | Safe |
| Dominik & Estelle | 50 (10,10,10,10,10) | Jive | "Hakuna Matata" | The Lion King | Safe |
| Izabela & Michał | 37 (7,7,10,7,6) | Viennese Waltz | "Le Festin" | Ratatouille | Safe |
| Dominik & Magdalena | 48 (9,10,10,9,10) | Contemporary | "Waiting on a Wish" | Snow White | Safe |
| Piotr & Julia | 46 (8,10,10,9,9) | Waltz | "Beauty and the Beast" | Beauty and the Beast | Safe |

=== Week 8: Immunity Challenge Night ===
Running order

| Couple | Score | Dance | Music | Result |
|---|---|---|---|---|
| Piotr & Julia; Mandaryna & Krystian; Helena & Roman; Jasper & Daria; Dominik & Estelle; Izabela & Michał; Dominik & Magdalena | Winner - - - - - - | Boogie-woogie; Marathon | "Boogie Woogie Bugle Boy"—The Andrews Sisters | |
| Dominik & Magdalena | 31 (7,10,8,6) | Quickstep | "Płynie w nas gorąca krew"—Bajm | Bottom three |
| Helena & Roman | 38 (10,10,9,9) | Rumba | "Beneath Your Beautiful"—Labrinth featuring Emeli Sandé | Safe |
| Mandaryna & Krystian | 36 (9,10,8,9) | Jive | "Be The One"—Dua Lipa | Bottom three |
| Izabela & Michał | 39 (9,10,10,10) | Paso Doble | "España cañí"—Pascual Marquina Narro | Safe |
| Dominik & Estelle | 39 (10,10,9,10) | Rumba | "Set Fire to the Rain"—Adele | Safe |
| Jasper & Daria | 33 (8,10,8,7) | Waltz | "(You Make Me Feel Like) A Natural Woman"—Aretha Franklin | Bottom three |
| Piotr & Julia | N/A | Paso Doble | "Smooth Criminal"—Michael Jackson | Safe (Immunity) |

Dance-off performances

| Couple | Dance | Music | Result |
|---|---|---|---|
| Mandaryna & Krystian | Jive | "Be The One"—Dua Lipa | Safe |
| Jasper & Daria | Waltz | "(You Make Me Feel Like) A Natural Woman"—Aretha Franklin | Safe |
| Dominik & Magdalena | Quickstep | "Płynie w nas gorąca krew"—Bajm | Eliminated |

=== Week 9: Irena Santor Night ===
Individual judges scores in the charts below (given in parentheses) are listed in this order from left to right: Tomasz Wygoda, Jolanta Kwaśniewska, Rafał Maserak, Iwona Pavlović.

Running order

| Couple | Score | Dance | Music |
|---|---|---|---|
| Helena & Roman | 40 (10,10,10,10) | Viennese Waltz | "Embarras"—Irena Santor |
| Helena & Roman | 38 (9,10,9,10) | Taniec góralski | "Hej, bystra woda" |
| Dominik & Estelle | 37 (9,10,9,9) | Oberek | "Dziura w desce" |
| Dominik & Estelle | 38 (10,10,9,9) | Tango | "Serce"—Irena Santor |
| Piotr & Julia | 27 (7,10,6,4) | Cha-cha-cha | "Już nie ma dzikich plaż"—Irena Santor |
| Piotr & Julia | 34 (8,10,9,7) | Krakowiak | "Krakowiaczek jeden" |
| Izabela & Michał | 38 (9,10,10,9) | Polka | "Ech, poleczko" |
| Izabela & Michał | 36 (9,10,9,8) | Viennese Waltz | "Powrócisz tu"—Irena Santor |
| Jasper & Daria | 38 (10,10,9,9) | Charleston | "Najpiękniejsze Warszawianki to przyjezdne"—Irena Santor |
| Jasper & Daria | 30 (7,10,7,6) | Csárdás | "Tycha woda" |
| Mandaryna & Krystian | 40 (10,10,10,10) | Mazurek | "Uciekła mi przepióreczka" |
| Mandaryna & Krystian | 36 (9,10,9,8) | Viennese Waltz | "Na prawo most, na lewo most"—Irena Santor |

=== Week 10: Trio Challenge Night ===
Running order

| Couple | Score | Dance | Music | Result |
|---|---|---|---|---|
| Dominik & Estelle (Żaklina Ta Dinh) | 29 (8,8,7,6) | Samba | "Hips Don't Lie"—Shakira feat. Wyclef Jean | Safe |
| Dominik & Estelle (Żaklina Ta Dinh) | 34 (9,9,9,7) | Foxtrot | "Budapest"—George Ezra | Safe |
| Mandaryna & Krystian (Jan Błachowicz) | 36 (9,9,9,9) | Cha-cha-cha | "Sex Bomb"—Tom Jones | Safe |
| Mandaryna & Krystian (Jan Błachowicz) | 38 (9,10,10,9) | Charleston | "Freedom! '90"—George Michael | Safe |
| Helena & Roman (Magdalena Boczarska, finalist Season 31) | 40 (10,10,10,10) | Argentine Tango | "Tango de los Exilados"—Vanessa-Mae | Safe |
| Helena & Roman (Magdalena Boczarska, finalist Season 31) | 40 (10,10,10,10) | Samba | "24K Magic"—Bruno Mars | Safe |
| Izabela & Michał (Marek Modzelewski) | 40 (10,10,10,10) | Argentine Tango | "Por una Cabeza"—Carlos Gardel | Safe |
| Izabela & Michał (Marek Modzelewski) | 40 (10,10,10,10) | Foxtrot | "Back to Black"—Amy Winehouse | Safe |
| Piotr & Julia (Agnieszka Litwin, contestant Season 26) | 35 (8,10,9,8) | Charleston | "Charleston"—Elisabeth Welch | Safe |
| Piotr & Julia (Agnieszka Litwin, contestant Season 26) | 40 (10,10,10,10) | Tango | "Och, życie kocham cię nad życie"—Edyta Geppert | Safe |
| Jasper & Daria (Kuba Szmajkowski) | 28 (8,8,7,5) | Quickstep | "That Man"—Caro Emerald | Eliminated |
| Jasper & Daria (Kuba Szmajkowski) | 36 (9,10,9,8) | Argentine Tango | "Natural"—Imagine Dragons | Eliminated |

=== Week 11: The Semifinals ===
Running order

| Couple | Score | Dance | Music | Result |
|---|---|---|---|---|
| Mandaryna & Krystian; Piotr & Julia; Helena & Roman; Dominik & Estelle; Izabela & Michał | 6; 2; 8; 10; 4 | Rumba-thon | "Shape of My Heart"—Sting "When We Dance"—Sting "Fields of Gold"—Sting "It's Probably Me"—Sting and Eric Clapton "Every Breath You Take"—The Police | |
| Mandaryna & Krystian | 38 (10,10,9,9) | Salsa | "María"—Ricky Martin | Bottom three |
| Helena & Roman | 40 (10,10,10,10) | Paso Doble | "Les Toreadors"—Georges Bizet | Safe |
| Piotr & Julia | 33 (9,9,8,7) | Jive | "Wake Me Up Before You Go-Go"—Wham! | Bottom three |
| Dominik & Estelle | 40 (10,10,10,10) | Paso Doble | "It's My Life"—Bon Jovi | Safe |
| Izabela & Michał | 37 (9,10,9,9) | Jive | "Bad Guy"—Billie Eilish | Bottom three |

Dance-off performances

| Couple | Dance | Music | Result |
|---|---|---|---|
| Mandaryna & Krystian | Viennese Waltz | "Can I Call You Rose?"—Thee Sacred Souls | Safe |
| Piotr & Julia | Waltz | "Against All Odds (Take a Look at Me Now)"—Phil Collins | Eliminated |
| Izabela & Michał | Waltz | "W czarnej urnie"—Kult | Safe |

=== Week 12: The Finals ===
Running order

| Couple | Score | Dance | Music | Result |
|---|---|---|---|---|
| Mandaryna & Krystian | | | | |
| Mandaryna & Krystian | | Freestyle | | |
| Helena & Roman | | | | |
| Helena & Roman | | Freestyle | | |
| Dominik & Estelle | | | | |
| Dominik & Estelle | | Freestyle | | |
| Izabela & Michał | | | | |
| Izabela & Michał | | Freestyle | | |

== Dance chart ==
The celebrities and professional partners danced one of these routines for each corresponding week:

- Week 1 (Season Premiere - Italian Week): Cha-cha-cha, Viennese Waltz, Jive, Samba, Foxtrot, Argentine Tango, Quickstep and Tango
- Week 2 (Black Mamba Academy): One unlearned dance (introducing Waltz)
- Week 3 (Maryla Night): One unlearned dance (introducing Rumba and Salsa)
- Week 4 (Time Machine Night): One unlearned dance (introducing Paso Doble and Contemporary)
- Week 5 (Family Night): One unlearned dance (introducing Charleston, Funk and Rock and Roll)
- Week 6 (Latin Night): One unlearned dance
- Week 7 (Disney Night): One unlearned dance
- Week 8 (Immunity Challenge Night): Boogie-woogie Marathon and one unlearned dance
- Week 9 (Irena Santor Night): One redemption dance & one Polish folk dance
- Week 10 (Trio Challenge Night): One unlearned dance and one repeated dance
- Week 11 (The Semifinals): Rumba-thon, one unlearned latin dance (solo dance) and one reapeated ballroom dance (dance off)
- Week 12 (The Finals): TBA and Freestyle

| Couple | 1 | 2 | 3 | 4 | 5 | 6 | 7 | 8 | | 9 | | 10 | | 11 | | 12 |
|---|---|---|---|---|---|---|---|---|---|---|---|---|---|---|---|---|
| Mandaryna & Krystian | Samba | Waltz | Rumba | Paso Doble | Funk | Cha-cha-cha | Viennese Waltz | Boogie-woogie (Marathon) | Jive | Mazurek | Viennese Waltz | Cha-cha-cha | Charleston | Rumba-thon | Salsa | Freestyle |
| Helena & Roman | Samba | Viennese Waltz | Jive | Cha-cha-cha | Viennese Waltz; Rock and Roll | Salsa | Contemporary | Boogie-woogie (Marathon) | Rumba | Viennese Waltz | Taniec góralski | Argentine Tango | Samba | Rumba-thon | Paso Doble | Freestyle |
| Dominik & Estelle | Tango | Cha-cha-cha | Foxtrot | Contemporary | Viennese Waltz | Salsa | Jive | Boogie-woogie (Marathon) | Rumba | Oberek | Tango | Samba | Foxtrot | Rumba-thon | Paso Doble | Freestyle |
| Izabela & Michał | Cha-cha-cha | Waltz | Samba | Rumba | Salsa | Argentine Tango | Viennese Waltz | Boogie-woogie (Marathon) | Paso Doble | Polka | Viennese Waltz | Argentine Tango | Foxtrot | Rumba-thon | Jive | Freestyle |
| Piotr & Julia | Cha-cha-cha | Viennese Waltz | Salsa | Rumba | Tango | Samba | Waltz | Boogie-woogie (Marathon) | Paso Doble | Cha-cha-cha | Krakowiak | Charleston | Tango | Rumba-thon | Jive | |
| Jasper & Daria | Quickstep | Jive | Tango | Paso Doble | Charleston | Rumba | Samba | Boogie-woogie (Marathon) | Waltz | Charleston | Csárdás | Quickstep | Argentine Tango | | | |
| Dominik & Magdalena | Foxtrot | Cha-cha-cha | Viennese Waltz | Jive | Rumba | Samba | Contemporary | Boogie-woogie (Marathon) | Quickstep | | | | | | | |
| Krzysztof & Sara | Cha-cha-cha | Viennese Waltz | Rumba | Samba | Salsa | Paso Doble | Quickstep | | | | | | | | | |
| Joanna & Kamil | Viennese Waltz | Cha-cha-cha | Foxtrot | Salsa | Jive | Tango | | | | | | | | | | |
| Kaeyra & Kacper | Foxtrot | Jive | Quickstep | Cha-cha-cha | | | | | | | | | | | | |
| Matteo & Izabela | Jive | Waltz | Cha-cha-cha | | | | | | | | | | | | | |
| Monika & Michał | Argentine Tango | Jive | | | | | | | | | | | | | | |

Highest scoring dance
Lowest scoring dance
Performed, but not scored
Bonus points
Not performed due to withdrawal
Gained bonus points for winning this dance-off
Gained no bonus points for losing this dance-off

== Guest performances ==
| Date | Artist(s) | Song(s) | Dancers |
|---|---|---|---|
| 6 September 2026 | Julia Wieniawa | "27 (Do gwiazd!)" | Collective Group |
| 6 September 2026 | Tomasz Szymuś's Orchestra | "Blame It on the Boogie" | All judges and Collective Group |
| 6 September 2026 | Tomasz Szymuś's Orchestra | "Pedro" | All couples and Collective Group |
| 13 September 2026 | Tomasz Szymuś's Orchestra | "Shut Up and Dance" | All couples |
| 20 September 2026 | Maryla Rodowicz | "Czadu Maryla" | All couples and Collective Group |
| 27 September 2026 | Tomasz Szymuś's Orchestra | "Gdzie są dzisiaj tamci ludzie" | All professional dancers and Collective Group |
| 4 October 2026 | Cleo | "Dom" | |
| 4 October 2026 | Michał Wiśniewski & Etiennette Wiśniewska | "Zawsze z tobą chciałbym być" | Mandaryna, Krystian Rzymkiewicz & Xavier Wiśniewski |
| 11 October 2026 | Tomasz Szymuś's Orchestra | "Conga" | All couples |
| 18 October 2026 | Edyta Górniak | "Kolorowy wiatr" | |
| 18 October 2026 | Tomasz Szymuś's Orchestra | "A Million Splashes of Colour" | Rafał Maserak, Donald Duck & Daisy Duck |
| 18 October 2026 | Natalia Kukulska | "Ani słowa" | Collective Group |
| 25 October 2026 | Tomasz Szymuś's Orchestra | "I Wanna Dance with Somebody" | All couples and Collective Group |
| 1 November 2026 | Ludowy Zespół Artystyczny "Promni" | "Karczmareczka"/"Tych lat nie odda nikt" | Ludowy Zespół Artystyczny "Promni" |
| 22 November 2026 | Tomasz Szymuś's Orchestra | "Hedwig's Theme"/"Sing Sing Sing"/"Libertango"/"Where Is My Husband" | Various Dancers |
| 22 November 2026 | Anita Lipnicka | "I wszystko się może zdarzyć" | |
| 22 November 2026 | Margaret | "Primabalerina", "Tańcz głupia" | |

== Rating figures ==
| Date | Episode | Official rating 4+ | Share 4+ | Official rating 16–49 | Share 16–49 | Official rating 16–59 | Share 16–59 |
|---|---|---|---|---|---|---|---|
| 6 September 2026 | 1 | | | | | | |
| 13 September 2026 | 2 | | | | | | |
| 20 September 2026 | 3 | | | | | | |
| 27 September 2026 | 4 | | | | | | |
| 4 October 2026 | 5 | | | | | | |
| 11 October 2026 | 6 | | | | | | |
| 18 October 2026 | 7 | | | | | | |
| 25 October 2026 | 8 | | | | | | |
| 1 November 2026 | 9 | | | | | | |
| 15 November 2026 | 10 | | | | | | |
| 22 November 2026 | 11 | | | | | | |
| 29 November 2026 | 12 | | | | | | |
| Average | Fall 2026 | | | | | | |
