= Taniec z gwiazdami season 30 =

Polish TV show

Taniec z gwiazdami
- Season 30
- Hosted by: Krzysztof Ibisz; Paulina Sykut-Jeżyna
- Judges: Rafał Maserak; Ewa Kasprzyk; Tomasz Wygoda; Iwona Pavlović
- Celebrity winner: Mikołaj Bagiński
- Professional winner: Magdalena Tarnowska
- No. of episodes: 10

Release
- Original network: Polsat
- Original release: 14 September – 16 November 2025

Season chronology
- ← Previous; Season 29 Next → Season 31

The 30th season of Taniec z gwiazdami, the Polish edition of Dancing with the Stars, began on 14 September 2025. This was the seventeenth season aired on Polsat.

Iwona Pavlović, Rafał Maserak, Ewa Kasprzyk and Tomasz Wygoda returned as judges. Beata Kozidrak joined them for 4th episode and Maciej Musiał joined them for the special round during 7th episode.

Krzysztof Ibisz and Paulina Sykut-Jeżyna reprised their role as hosts. Due to show's 30th season some previous hosts returned to the show: Magda Mołek (hostess of season 1) and Hubert Urbański (seasons: 1–5) co-hosted the first episode of the season and Katarzyna Skrzynecka (seasons: 2–12) and Piotr Gąsowski (seasons: 6–13) co-hosted the 3th, "jubilee" episode.

Michał Bartkiewicz, Sara Janicka, Agnieszka Kaczorowska, Michał Kassin, Albert Kosiński, Kamil Kuroczko, Janja Lesar, Piotr Musiałkowski, Izabela Skierska, Julia Suryś, Daria Syta and Magdalena Tarnowska returned to the series.

On 16 November, Mikołaj Bagiński and his partner Magdalena Tarnowska were crowned the champions.

== Couples ==
Celebrity	Notability	Professional partner	Status	Source(s)
Michał Czernecki	Film & television actor	Julia Suryś	Withdrew on 20 August 2025	
Ewa Minge	Fashion designer	Michał Bartkiewicz	Eliminated 1st on 21 September 2025	
Lanberry	Singer-songwriter	Piotr Musiałkowski	Eliminated 2nd on 5 October 2025	
Maja Bohosiewicz	Actress & Love Never Lies Polska host	Albert Kosiński	Withdrew on 16 October 2025	
Aleksander Sikora	Polsat presenter	Daria Syta	Eliminated 3rd on 19 October 2025	
Marcin Rogacewicz	Film and television actor	Agnieszka Kaczorowska	Eliminated 4th on 26 October 2025	
Barbara Bursztynowicz	Former Klan actress	Michał Kassin	Eliminated 5th on 2 November 2025	
Tomasz Karolak	Actor and singer	Izabela Skierska	Eliminated 6th & 7th on 9 November 2025	
Katarzyna Zillmann	Olympic rower	Janja Lesar	Eliminated 6th & 7th on 9 November 2025	
Wiktoria Gorodecka	Film and television actress & model	Kamil Kuroczko	Third place on 16 November 2025	
Maurycy Popiel	M jak miłość actor	Sara Janicka	Runners-up on 16 November 2025	
Mikołaj Bagiński	Social media personality	Magdalena Tarnowska	Winners on 16 November 2025	

== Scoring chart ==
Couple	Place	1	2	1+2	3	4	3+4	5	6	5+6	7	8	9	10
Mikołaj & Magdalena	1	29	28	57	29	35	64	40†	33	73	36	32+37=69	31+40=71	37+35+40=112‡
Maurycy & Sara	2	30	32	62	40†	34	74	40†	35	75	38	40+36=76	37+40=77	40+38+40=118
Wiktoria & Kamil	3	35	39†	74†	38	37	75	40†	40†	80†	40	40+40=80†	40+40=80†	40+40+40=120†
Katarzyna & Janja	4	36†	37	73	37	40†	77†	40†	38	78	40+1=41†	37+40=77	40+40=80†	
Tomasz & Izabela	4	23‡	22‡	45‡	18‡	27	45‡	31	28‡	59	33+3=36	32+31=63	30+35=65‡	
Barbara & Michał	6	27	26	53	22	24‡	46	30‡	28‡	58‡	23+2=25‡	23+32=55‡		
Marcin & Agnieszka	7	34	34	68	37	38	75	37	40†	77	33			
Aleksander & Daria	8	33	33	66	30	40†	70	32	28‡	60				
Maja & Albert	9	28	28	56	25	31	56	36	—	—				
Lanberry & Piotr	10	28	35	63	36	31	67							
Ewa & Michał	11	24	29	53										

Red numbers indicate the lowest score for each week.
Green numbers indicate the highest score for each week.
indicates the couple eliminated that week.
indicates the couple that was eliminated but later returned to the competition.
indicates the returning couple that finished in the bottom two or three.
indicates the winning couple.
indicates the runner-up.
indicates the couple in third place.
indicates the couple withdrew from the competition.

== Average score chart ==
This table only counts for dances scored on a 40-points scale.

Rank by average	Place	Couple	Total points	Number of dances	Average
1	3	Wiktoria & Kamil	549	14	39.2
2	4	Katarzyna & Janja	425	11	38.6
3	2	Maurycy & Sara	520	14	37.1
4	7	Marcin & Agnieszka	253	7	36.1
5	1	Mikołaj & Magdalena	482	14	34.4
6	8	Aleksander & Daria	196	6	32.7
7	10	Lanberry & Piotr	130	4	32.5
8	9	Maja & Albert	148	5	29.6
9	4	Tomasz & Izabela	310	11	28.2
10	11	Ewa & Michał	53	2	26.5
11	6	Barbara & Michał	235	9	26.1

== Highest and lowest scoring performances ==
The best and worst performances in each dance according to the judges' 40-point scale:

Dance	Best dancer(s)	Highest score	Worst dancer(s)	Lowest score
Cha-cha-cha	Marcin Rogacewicz; Wiktoria Gorodecka	40	Tomasz Karolak	23
Jive	Wiktoria Gorodecka	40	Lanberry; Maja Bohosiewicz	28
Quickstep	Aleksander Sikora	40	Maja Bohosiewicz; Mikołaj Bagiński	28
Viennese Waltz	Mikołaj Bagiński; Wiktoria Gorodecka	40	Tomasz Karolak	27
Paso Doble	Maurycy Popiel; Katarzyna Zillmann; Wiktoria Gorodecka	40	Lanberry; Mikołaj Bagiński	31
Waltz	Maurycy Popiel; Katarzyna Zillmann; Wiktoria Gorodecka	40	Tomasz Karolak	22
Charleston	Katarzyna Zillmann	40	Tomasz Karolak	18
Argentine Tango	Maurycy Popiel; Wiktoria Gorodecka	40	Maja Bohosiewicz	25
Contemporary	Katarzyna Zillmann	40	Marcin Rogacewicz	33
Samba	Wiktoria Gorodecka	40	Aleksander Sikora; Tomasz Karolak	28
Swing	Barbara Bursztynowicz	24		
Rumba	Wiktoria Gorodecka; Katarzyna Zillmann; Maurycy Popiel	40	Barbara Bursztynowicz	23
Tango	Katarzyna Zillmann	40	Barbara Bursztynowicz	28
Broadway Jazz	Maurycy Popiel	37	Tomasz Karolak	31
Salsa	Mikołaj Bagiński	40	Barbara Bursztynowicz	23
Foxtrot	Katarzyna Zillmann; Maurycy Popiel	38	Tomasz Karolak	33
Mambo	Wiktoria Gorodecka	40	Mikołaj Bagiński	32
Freestyle	Mikołaj Bagiński; Maurycy Popiel; Wiktoria Gorodecka	40		

== Couples' highest and lowest scoring dances ==
According to the 40-point scale:

Couples	Highest scoring dance(s)	Lowest scoring dance(s)
Mikołaj & Magdalena	Salsa, Viennese Waltz, Freestyle (40)	Quickstep (28)
Maurycy & Sara	Argentine Tango (twice), Waltz, Paso Doble, Rumba, Freestyle (40)	Cha-cha-cha (30)
Wiktoria & Kamil	Jive, Rumba, Samba, Cha-cha-cha, Waltz, Argentine Tango, Mambo, Paso Doble, Viennese Waltz, Freestyle (40)	Viennese Waltz (35)
Katarzyna & Janja	Tango, Charleston, Rumba, Contemporary, Waltz, Paso Doble (40)	Paso Doble (36)
Tomasz & Izabela	Viennese Waltz (35)	Charleston (18)
Barbara & Michał	Quickstep (32)	Charleston (22)
Marcin & Agnieszka	Cha-cha-cha (40)	Contemporary (33)
Aleksander & Daria	Quickstep (40)	Samba (28)
Maja & Albert	Broadway Jazz (36)	Argentine Tango (25)
Lanberry & Piotr	Cha-cha-cha (36)	Jive (28)
Ewa & Michał	Waltz (29)	Cha-cha-cha (24)

== Weekly scores ==
Unless indicated otherwise, individual judges scores in the charts below (given in parentheses) are listed in this order from left to right: Rafał Maserak, Ewa Kasprzyk, Tomasz Wygoda, Iwona Pavlović.

=== Week 1: Season Premiere ===
Running order

Couple	Score	Dance	Music
Maurycy & Sara	30 (8,8,7,7)	Cha-cha-cha	"Moves like Jagger"—Maroon 5 featuring Christina Aguilera
Lanberry & Piotr	28 (7,7,7,7)	Jive	"Co ja robię tu"—Lanberry
Maja & Albert	28 (8,8,6,6)	Quickstep	"Lush Life"—Zara Larsson
Wiktoria & Kamil	35 (9,9,9,8)	Viennese Waltz	"Nie proszę o więcej"—Edyta Górniak
Aleksander & Daria	33 (8,9,8,8)	Paso Doble	"Sexyback"—Justin Timberlake
Ewa & Michał	24 (6,7,6,5)	Cha-cha-cha	"Strong Enough"—Cher
Marcin & Agnieszka	34 (9,9,8,8)	Quickstep	"Valerie"—Amy Winehouse
Barbara & Michał	27 (8,8,7,4)	Waltz	"Życie jest nowelą"—Ryszard Rynkowski
Mikołaj & Magdalena	29 (8,8,7,6)	Jive	"Treat You Better"—Shawn Mendes
Katarzyna & Janja	36 (9,9,9,9)	Paso Doble	"Try"—Pink
Tomasz & Izabela	23 (6,6,6,5)	Cha-cha-cha	"King Bruce Lee"—Franek Kimono

=== Week 2 ===
Running order

Couple	Score	Dance	Music	Result
Maja & Albert	28 (7,8,7,6)	Jive	"Nie mówię tak, nie mówię nie"—Wiktor Dyduła	Safe
Maurycy & Sara	32 (8,9,8,7)	Quickstep	"It's Not Unusual"—Tom Jones	Safe
Lanberry & Piotr	35 (9,9,8,9)	Viennese Waltz	"Stop!"—Sam Brown	Safe
Ewa & Michał	29 (7,8,7,7)	Waltz	"When I Need You"—Rod Stewart	Eliminated
Mikołaj & Magdalena	28 (7,7,7,7)	Quickstep	"Kurier"—Krzysztof Zalewski	Safe
Katarzyna & Janja	37 (10,10,9,8)	Viennese Waltz	"Still Got The Blues"—Gary Moore	Safe
Wiktoria & Kamil	39 (10,10,9,10)	Paso Doble	"Frozen"—Madonna	Safe
Aleksander & Daria	33 (8,9,8,8)	Viennese Waltz	"To, co chciałbym Ci dać"—Pectus	Safe
Barbara & Michał	26 (7,8,6,5)	Cha-cha-cha	"Unchain My Heart"—Joe Cocker	Bottom two
Tomasz & Izabela	22 (6,6,5,5)	Waltz	"To świt, to zmrok" from Fiddler on the Roof	Safe
Marcin & Agnieszka	34 (9,9,8,8)	Paso Doble	"Pride (In the Name of Love)"—U2	Safe

=== Week 3: 20th Anniversary ===
Running order

Couple	Score	Dance	Music
Mikołaj & Magdalena	29 (7,8,7,7)	Cha-cha-cha	"Mystical Magical"—Benson Boone
Barbara & Michał	22 (6,7,5,4)	Charleston	"Vabank"—Henryk Kuźniak
Marcin & Agnieszka	37 (9,10,9,9)	Waltz	"I Will Always Love You"—Whitney Houston
Maurycy & Sara	40 (10,10,10,10)	Argentine Tango	"Melodia ta"—Doda
Aleksander & Daria	30 (7,8,8,7)	Jive	"Be The One"—Dua Lipa
Wiktoria & Kamil	38 (9,10,9,10)	Quickstep	"Nic do stracenia"—Mrozu & Sound'n'Grace
Katarzyna & Janja	37 (10,10,9,8)	Cha-cha-cha	"Freed From Desire"—Indiiana
Maja & Albert	25 (7,7,6,5)	Argentine Tango	"Czułe miejsce"—Baranovski
Lanberry & Piotr	36 (9,10,9,8)	Cha-cha-cha	"Cuba"—Gibson Brothers
Tomasz & Izabela	18 (4,7,4,3)	Charleston	"Chodź na Pragę"—Staszek Wielanek

=== Week 4: Beata Night ===
Individual judges scores in the charts below (given in parentheses) are listed in this order from left to right: Rafał Maserak, Beata Kozidrak, Tomasz Wygoda, Iwona Pavlović.

Running order

Couple	Score	Dance	Music	Result
Lanberry & Piotr	31 (7,10,7,7)	Paso Doble	"Biała Armia"—Bajm	Eliminated
Tomasz & Izabela	27 (7,9,6,5)	Viennese Waltz	"Piechotą do lata"—Bajm	Safe
Wiktoria & Kamil	37 (9,10,9,9)	Contemporary	"Szklanka wody"—Bajm	Safe
Maja & Albert	31 (8,9,7,7)	Samba	"O Tobie"—Bajm	Bottom two
Barbara & Michał	24 (6,9,5,4)	Swing	"Nie ma wody na pustyni"—Bajm	Safe
Mikołaj & Magdalena	35 (9,10,8,8)	Viennese Waltz	"Dwa serca, dwa smutki"—Bajm	Safe
Aleksander & Daria	40 (10,10,10,10)	Quickstep	"Płynie w nas gorąca krew"—Bajm	Safe
Maurycy & Sara	34 (8,9,9,8)	Jive	"Józek, nie daruję Ci tej nocy"—Bajm	Safe
Marcin & Agnieszka	38 (10,10,9,9)	Rumba	"Taka Warszawa"—Bajm	Safe
Katarzyna & Janja	40 (10,10,10,10)	Tango	"Co mi Panie dasz"—Bajm	Safe

=== Week 5: Family Night ===
Running order

Couple	Score	Dance	Music
Aleksander & Daria (Ewelina Maniak, cousin)	32 (8,9,8,7)	Cha-cha-cha	"Nie musisz się bać"—Oskar Cyms
Wiktoria & Kamil (Konstanty Veizdžiunas, brother)	40 (10,10,10,10)	Jive	"Płonie stodoła"—Czesław Niemen
Tomasz & Izabela (Lena Kołakowska, daughter)	31 (7,8,8,8)	Broadway Jazz	"Muppet Show"—Joanna Newsom
Barbara & Michał (Jacek Bursztynowicz, husband)	30 (8,9,7,6)	Viennese Waltz	"Can't Help Falling in Love"—Elvis Presley
Maja & Albert (Leonia Kwaśniewska, daughter)	36 (9,10,9,8)	Broadway Jazz	"New York, New York"—Frank Sinatra
Maurycy & Sara (Lidia Bogaczówna, mother)	40 (10,10,10,10)	Waltz	"Na paluszkach"—Kayah
Katarzyna & Janja (Ludwika Zillmann, mother)	40 (10,10,10,10)	Charleston	"Charleston"—Sam Levine
Marcin & Agnieszka (Ewa Rogacewicz, mother)	37 (9,10,9,9)	Viennese Waltz	"Don't Let Me Go"—Tom Odell
Mikołaj & Magdalena (Matylda Bagińska, sister)	40 (10,10,10,10)	Salsa	"Santa Cruz"—Ekipa

=== Week 6: Memorable Dances ===
Running order

Couple	Score	Dance	Music	Original Dance	Result
Maurycy & Sara	35 (8,10,8,9)	Rumba	"Senza una donna"—Zucchero & Paul Young	Kinga Rusin & Stefano Terrazzino; Season 4	Safe
Mikołaj & Magdalena	33 (8,9,8,8)	Tango	"Santa Maria (Del Buen Ayre)"—Gotan Project	Klaudia Halejcio & Tomasz Barański; Season 14	Safe
Aleksander & Daria	28 (7,7,7,7)	Samba	"Dancing Queen"—ABBA	Dawid Kwiatkowski & Janja Lesar; Season 14	Eliminated
Wiktoria & Kamil	40 (10,10,10,10)	Rumba	"Wspaniały świat" from Aladdin	Agata Kulesza & Stefano Terrazzino; Season 8	Safe
Barbara & Michał	28 (7,8,7,6)	Tango	"El Tango de Roxanne" from Moulin Rouge!	Edyta Górniak & Jan Kliment; Season 12	Safe
Katarzyna & Janja	38 (9,10,10,9)	Foxtrot	"Jesienne róże"—Mieczysław Fogg	Jacek Jelonek & Michał Danilczuk; Season 26	Safe
Marcin & Agnieszka	40 (10,10,10,10)	Cha-cha-cha	"Cry to Me"—Solomon Burke	Julia Wieniawa & Stefano Terrazzino; Season 24	Safe
Tomasz & Izabela	28 (7,7,7,7)	Samba	"All My Loving"—The Beatles	Piotr Gąsowski & Anna Głogowska; Season 2	Bottom two
Maja & Albert	—	Contemporary	"Napraw"—LemON	Agnieszka Sienkiewicz & Stefano Terrazzino; Season 15	Withdrew

=== Week 7: Italian Night ===
Running order

Couple	Score	Dance	Music	Result
Katarzyna & Janja	40 (10,10,10,10)	Rumba	"La Mia Storia Tra Le Dita"—Laura Pausini	Safe
Barbara & Michał	23 (6,6,6,5)	Salsa	"Quando, Quando, Quando"—Tony Renis	Bottom two
Marcin & Agnieszka	33 (8,9,8,8)	Contemporary	"Meravigliosa creatura"—Gianna Nannini	Eliminated
Wiktoria & Kamil	40 (10,10,10,10)	Samba	"Volare"—Domenico Modugno	Safe
Mikołaj & Magdalena	36 (9,9,9,9)	Rumba	"Cose della vita"—Eros Ramazzotti	Safe
Tomasz & Izabela	33 (8,9,8,8)	Foxtrot	"Felicità"—Al Bano & Romina Power	Safe
Maurycy & Sara	38 (9,10,10,9)	Foxtrot	"L'Italiano"—Toto Cutugno	Safe
Tomasz & Izabela; Barbara & Michał; Katarzyna & Janja; Maurycy & Sara; Wiktoria & Kamil; Mikołaj & Magdalena; Marcin & Agnieszka	3; 2; 1 x x x x	Potańcówka	"Już taki jestem zimny drań"—Eugeniusz Bodo "Sex appeal"—Eugeniusz Bodo "Już nie zapomnisz mnie"—Aleksander Żabczyński	

=== Week 8: Winners Trio Challenge ===
Running order

Couple	Score	Dance	Music	Result
Wiktoria & Kamil (Joanna Mazur, Season 22)	40 (10,10,10,10)	Cha-cha-cha	"She Bangs"—Ricky Martin	Safe
Wiktoria & Kamil (Joanna Mazur, Season 22)	40 (10,10,10,10)	Waltz	"No Time To Die"—Billie Eilish	Safe
Barbara & Michał (Aneta Zając, Season 14)	23 (6,7,6,4)	Rumba	"We Don't Need Another Hero"—Tina Turner	Eliminated
Barbara & Michał (Aneta Zając, Season 14)	32 (8,8,8,8)	Quickstep	"Cheri Cheri Lady"—Modern Talking	Eliminated
Katarzyna & Janja (Anita Sokołowska, Season 27)	37 (9,10,9,9)	Jive	"Part-Time Lover"—Stevie Wonder	Bottom two
Katarzyna & Janja (Anita Sokołowska, Season 27)	40 (10,10,10,10)	Contemporary	"Imagine"—John Lennon	Bottom two
Maurycy & Sara (Anna Mucha, Season 10)	40 (10,10,10,10)	Paso Doble	"España cañí"—Pascual Marquina Narro	Safe
Maurycy & Sara (Anna Mucha, Season 10)	36 (9,9,9,9)	Viennese Waltz	"Tears In The Sky"—Benson Boone feat. Billie Eilish (AI generated)	Safe
Mikołaj & Magdalena (Rafał Mroczek, Season 3)	32 (8,8,8,8)	Mambo	"Ran Kan Kan"—Tito Puente	Safe
Mikołaj & Magdalena (Rafał Mroczek, Season 3)	37 (9,10,9,9)	Foxtrot	"L-O-V-E"—Nat King Cole	Safe
Tomasz & Izabela (Robert Wabich, Season 19)	32 (7,9,8,8)	Paso Doble	"Los Torreadores"—Georges Bizet	Safe
Tomasz & Izabela (Robert Wabich, Season 19)	31 (8,9,7,7)	Argentine Tango	"Tango libido"—Püdelsi	Safe

=== Week 9: The Semifinals ===
Running order

Couple	Score	Dance	Music	Result
Mikołaj & Magdalena	31 (8,8,8,7)	Paso Doble	"Numb"—Linkin Park	Safe
Mikołaj & Magdalena	40 (10,10,10,10)	Viennese Waltz	"Letni deszcz"—EMO	Safe
Tomasz & Izabela	30 (7,10,7,6)	Rumba	"Shallow"—Lady Gaga & Bradley Cooper	Bottom three
Tomasz & Izabela	35 (8,9,10,8)	Viennese Waltz	"Noce i dnie"—Waldemar Kazanecki	Bottom three
Katarzyna & Janja	40 (10,10,10,10)	Waltz	"Hero"—Mariah Carey	Bottom three
Katarzyna & Janja	40 (10,10,10,10)	Paso Doble	"Bad Romance"—Lady Gaga	Bottom three
Maurycy & Sara	37 (9,10,9,9)	Broadway Jazz	"Express"—Christina Aguilera	Safe
Maurycy & Sara	40 (10,10,10,10)	Rumba	"A Thousand Kisses Deep"—Leonard Cohen	Safe
Wiktoria & Kamil	40 (10,10,10,10)	Argentine Tango	"Och, życie kocham cię nad życie"—Edyta Geppert	Bottom three
Wiktoria & Kamil	40 (10,10,10,10)	Mambo	"Pacific Mambo Dance"—Pacific Mambo Orchestra	Bottom three

Dance-off performances

Couple	Dance	Music	Result
Wiktoria & Kamil	Cha-cha-cha	"Why Don't You Do Right"—Della Reese	Safe
Katarzyna & Janja	Cha-cha-cha	"Why Don't You Do Right"—Della Reese	Eliminated
Tomasz & Izabela	Cha-cha-cha	"Why Don't You Do Right"—Della Reese	Eliminated

=== Week 10: Final ===
Running order

Couple	Score	Dance	Music	Result
Maurycy & Sara	40 (10,10,10,10)	Argentine Tango	"Melodia ta"—Doda	Runners-up
Maurycy & Sara	38 (10,10,9,9)	Cha-cha-cha	"Moves like Jagger"—Maroon 5 featuring Christina Aguilera	Runners-up
Maurycy & Sara	40 (10,10,10,10)	Freestyle	"Wstyd"—Varius Manx	Runners-up
Wiktoria & Kamil	40 (10,10,10,10)	Paso Doble	"Frozen"—Madonna	3rd place
Wiktoria & Kamil	40 (10,10,10,10)	Viennese Waltz	"Nie proszę o więcej"—Edyta Górniak	3rd place
Wiktoria & Kamil	40 (10,10,10,10)	Freestyle	"Smooth Criminal"—Michael Jackson "You Are Not Alone"—Michael Jackson	3rd place
Mikołaj & Magdalena	37 (9,10,9,9)	Foxtrot	"L-O-V-E"—Nat King Cole	Winners
Mikołaj & Magdalena	35 (9,9,9,8)	Jive	"Treat You Better"—Shawn Mendes	Winners
Mikołaj & Magdalena	40 (10,10,10,10)	Freestyle	"Wiśnia"—Kaśka Sochacka	Winners

Other Dances

Couple	Dance	Music
Katarzyna & Janja	Viennese Waltz	"You Are the Reason"—Calum Scott
Tomasz & Izabela	Viennese Waltz	"You Are the Reason"—Calum Scott
Barbara & Michał	Viennese Waltz	"You Are the Reason"—Calum Scott
Marcin & Agnieszka	Viennese Waltz	"You Are the Reason"—Calum Scott
Aleksander & Daria	Viennese Waltz	"You Are the Reason"—Calum Scott
Maja & Albert	Viennese Waltz	"You Are the Reason"—Calum Scott
Lanberry & Piotr	Viennese Waltz	"You Are the Reason"—Calum Scott
Ewa & Michał	Viennese Waltz	"You Are the Reason"—Calum Scott

== Dance chart ==
The celebrities and professional partners danced one of these routines for each corresponding week:

- Week 1 (Season Premiere): Cha-cha-cha, Jive, Quickstep, Viennese Waltz, Paso Doble, Waltz
- Week 2: One unlearned dance
- Week 3 (20th Anniversary): One unlearned dance (introducing Charleston, Argentine Tango)
- Week 4 (Bajm Night): One unlearned dance (introducing Tango, Samba, Rumba, Contemporary, Swing)
- Week 5 (Family Night - Trios): One unlearned dance (introducing Broadway Jazz, Salsa)
- Week 6 (Memorable Dances): One unlearned dance (introducing Foxtrot)
- Week 7 (Italian Night): One unlearned dance and "Potańcówka u Maćka" Marathon
- Week 8 (Winners Trio Challenge): Two unlearned dances (introducing Mambo)
- Week 9 (The Semifinals): One unlearned dance and one repeated dance
  Wiktoria & Kamil: Two unlearned dances
- Week 10 (The Finals): Judges' choice, rivals' choice (Week 1) and Freestyle

Couple	1	2	3	4	5	6	7		8		9		10		
Mikołaj & Magdalena	Jive	Quickstep	Cha-cha-cha	Viennese Waltz	Salsa	Tango	Rumba	Potańcówka (Marathon)	Mambo	Foxtrot	Paso Doble	Viennese Waltz	Foxtrot	Jive	Freestyle
Maurycy & Sara	Cha-cha-cha	Quickstep	Argentine Tango	Jive	Waltz	Rumba	Foxtrot	Potańcówka (Marathon)	Paso Doble	Viennese Waltz	Broadway Jazz	Rumba	Argentine Tango	Cha-cha-cha	Freestyle
Wiktoria & Kamil	Viennese Waltz	Paso Doble	Quickstep	Contemporary	Jive	Rumba	Samba	Potańcówka (Marathon)	Cha-cha-cha	Waltz	Argentine Tango	Mambo	Paso Doble	Viennese Waltz	Freestyle
Katarzyna & Janja	Paso Doble	Viennese Waltz	Cha-cha-cha	Tango	Charleston	Foxtrot	Rumba	Potańcówka (Marathon)	Jive	Contemporary	Waltz	Paso Doble			Viennese Waltz
Tomasz & Izabela	Cha-cha-cha	Waltz	Charleston	Viennese Waltz	Broadway Jazz	Samba	Foxtrot	Potańcówka (Marathon)	Paso Doble	Argentine Tango	Rumba	Viennese Waltz			Viennese Waltz
Barbara & Michał	Waltz	Cha-cha-cha	Charleston	Swing	Viennese Waltz	Tango	Salsa	Potańcówka (Marathon)	Rumba	Quickstep					Viennese Waltz
Marcin & Agnieszka	Quickstep	Paso Doble	Waltz	Rumba	Viennese Waltz	Cha-cha-cha	Contemporary	Potańcówka (Marathon)							Viennese Waltz
Aleksander & Daria	Paso Doble	Viennese Waltz	Jive	Quickstep	Cha-cha-cha	Samba									Viennese Waltz
Maja & Albert	Quickstep	Jive	Argentine Tango	Samba	Broadway Jazz	Contemporary									Viennese Waltz
Lanberry & Piotr	Jive	Viennese Waltz	Cha-cha-cha	Paso Doble											Viennese Waltz
Ewa & Michał	Cha-cha-cha	Waltz													Viennese Waltz

Highest scoring dance
Lowest scoring dance
Performed, but not scored
Bonus points
Not performed due to withdrawal
Gained bonus points for winning this dance-off
Gained no bonus points for losing this dance-off

== Guest performances ==
Date	Artist(s)	Song(s)	Dancers
14 September 2025	Tomasz Szymuś's Orchestra	"Star Wars (Main Title)"	All professional dancers & Collective Group
28 September 2025	Tomasz Szymuś's Orchestra	"Give Me Your Love"	Kamila Kajak-Mosejcuk & Andrej Mosejcuk, Magdalena Soszyńska & Robert Kochanek, Aneta Piotrowska & Robert Rowiński, Sylwia Madeńska & Wojciech Kucina, Katarzyna Vu Manh & Mieszko Masłowski, Julia Suryś & Michał Jeziorowski, Hanna Żudziewicz & Jacek Jeschke, Wiktoria Omyła & Wojciech Jeschke and Nina Tyrka & Krzysztof Hulboj
28 September 2025	Tomasz Szymuś's Orchestra	"Ostatni"	Anna Mucha & Rafał Maserak
28 September 2025	Tomasz Szymuś's Orchestra	"Ai No Corrida"	Rafał Mroczek & Magdalena Tarnowska
5 October 2025	Beata Kozidrak	"Bingo"	
5 October 2025	Beata Kozidrak & Kamp!	"Siedzę i myślę"	
12 October 2025	Roksana Węgiel	"Błękit"	
12 October 2025	Tomasz Szymuś's Orchestra	"Nic dwa razy"	Hanna Żudziewicz-Jeschke & Jacek Jeschke
26 October 2025	Tomasz Szymuś's Orchestra	"Pronto come va"	Collective Group
2 November 2025	Tomasz Szymuś's Orchestra	"Jeden dzień"	Teatr Muzyczny ROMA
9 November 2025	Natalia Muianga	"Och, życie kocham cię nad życie"	Wiktoria Gorodecka & Kamil Kuroczko
16 November 2025	Tomasz Szymuś's Orchestra	"Training Season"	Collective Group
16 November 2025	Tomasz Szymuś's Orchestra	"Cell Block Tango" "Roxanne"	Justyna Steczkowska & Stefano Terrazzino
16 November 2025	Calum Scott	"You Are the Reason"	All couples
16 November 2025	Calum Scott	"I Wanna Dance with Somebody (Who Loves Me)"	

== Rating figures ==
Date	Episode	Official rating 4+	Share 4+	Official rating 16–49	Share 16–49	Official rating 16–59	Share 16–59
14 September 2025	1						
21 September 2025	2						
28 September 2025	3						
5 October 2025	4						
12 October 2025	5						
19 October 2025	6						
26 October 2025	7						
2 November 2025	8						
9 November 2025	9						
16 November 2025	10						
Average	Fall 2025						
