= Helena Englert =

Polish actress (born 2000)

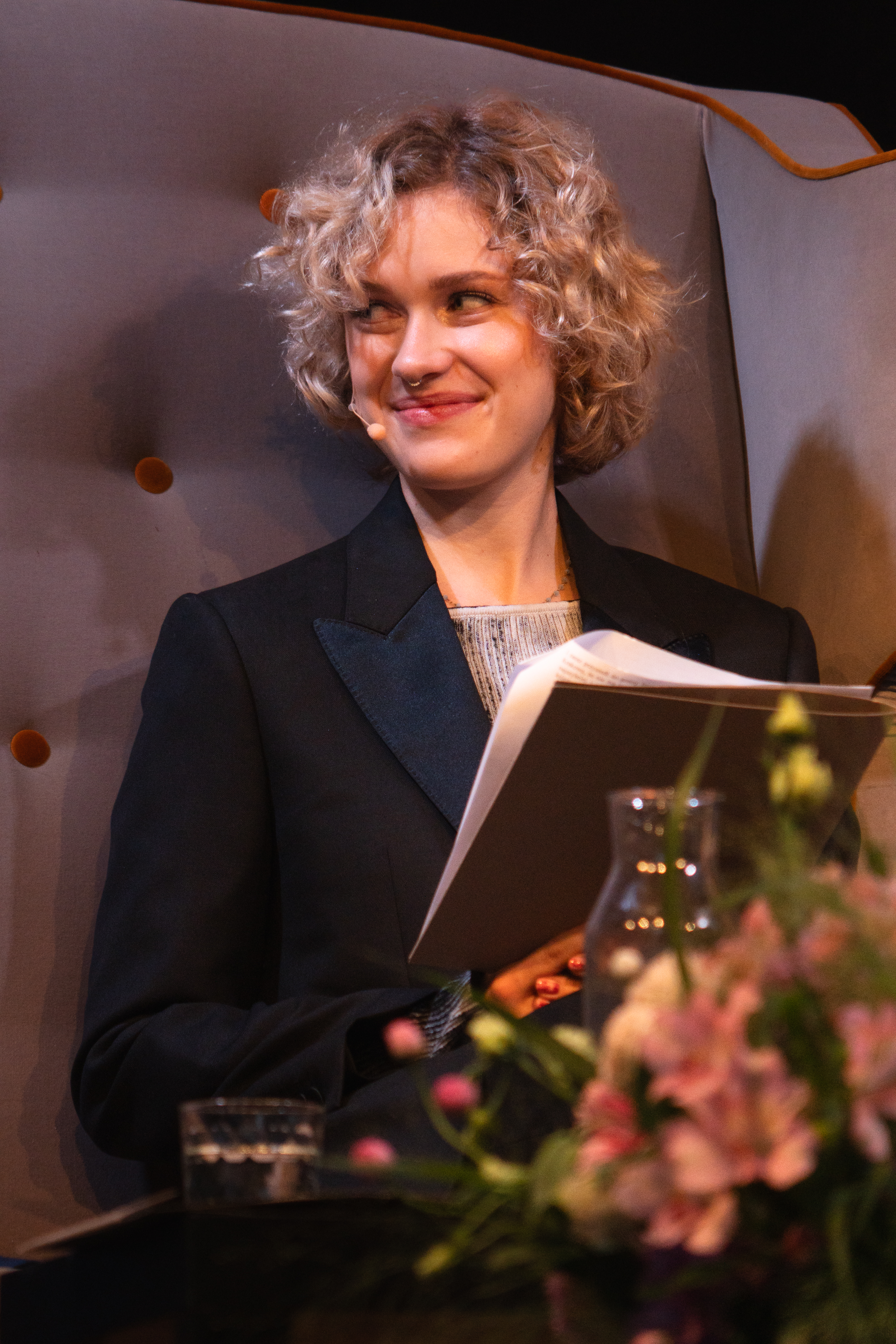
- Englert in 2024.
- Born: 14 June 2000 (age 25); Warsaw, Poland
- Education: Aleksander Zelwerowicz National Academy of Dramatic Art
- Occupation: Actress
- Years active: 2010 – present
- Parents: Jan Englert (father); Beata Ścibakówna (mother)
- Relatives: Marta Lipińska (aunt); Michał Englert (cousin)

Helena Englert (Polish: [xɛˈlɛ.na ˈɛŋ.ɡlɛrt]; born 14 June 2000) is a Polish film, television, stage, and voice actress. She had leading role as Alicja Stec in the HBO Max crime drama series BringBackAlice (2023), and was part of the main cast in the Canal+ comedy drama Love Algorithm (2024), and had recurring roles of Angela Kowalska in TVP2 drama series Barwy szczęścia (2016–2018), Patrycja Krynicka in the TVN thriller medical drama series Diagnosis (2018–2019), and TVP2 sitcom series Family.pl (2025). Englert also portrayed Inez in the romance film Pokusa (2023), and Dominika in the comedy film Sex for Dummies (2025).

== Biography ==
Helena Englert was born on 14 June 2000 in Warsaw, Poland. She is the daughter of actors Jan Englert and Beata Ścibakówna. At the age of two, she appeared in the 2002 comedy film Superproduction. In 2010, she voiced Edith in the Polish-language dubbing version of the Illumination animated comedy film Despicable Me, and in its sequels, Despicable Me 2 in 2013, and Despicable Me 3 in 2017. In 2013, she acted in an action film titled The Closed Circuit. She portrayed Angela Kowalska in TVP2 drama series Barwy szczęścia from 2016 to 2018, and Patrycja Krynicka in the TVN thriller medical drama series Diagnosis from 2018 to 2019. She also appeared in series such as I'll Be Fine (2017), W rytmie serca (2017), Wartime Girls (2018), Signs (2018–2019), The Better Half (2019), and The Elements of Sasza – Fire (2020).

In 2023, Englert portrayed leading roles of Alicja Stec in the HBO Max crime drama series BringBackAlice, and Inez in romance film Pokusa. She also had main roles of Dagmara in the Canal+ comedy drama Love Algorithm (2024), and Dominika in comedy film Sex for Dummies (2025), and a recurring role of Sonia in the TVP2 comedy series Family.pl (2025–2026).

In 2024, Englert graduated from the Aleksander Zelwerowicz National Academy of Dramatic Art in Warsaw. Previously, she also studied at the New York University Tisch School of the Arts in New York City, United States, however she did not graduate.

== Filmography ==
=== Film ===
Year	Title	Role	Notes
2002	Superproduction	Herself	Feature film; cameo
2013	The Closed Circuit	Kasia	Feature film
2019	All for My Mother	Ewka	Feature film
2019	Imperium	Krystyna Wańkowiczówna	Television play
2023	Pokusa	Inez	Feature film; leading role
2024	The Green Dinosaur	Publisher	Feature film
2024	The Green Dinosaur	Additional voices	Feature film; voice
2025	Sex for Dummies	Dominika	Main role

=== Television series ===
Year	Title	Role	Notes
2016–2018	Barwy szczęścia	Angela Kowalska	Recurring role; 103 episodes
2017	I'll Be Fine	Olka	Episode no. 86
2017	W rytmie serca	Natalia	Episode: "Na krawędzi"
2018	Wartime Girls	Kasia	5 episodes
2018–2019	Diagnosis	Patrycja Krynicka	Recurring role; 10 episodes
2018–2019	Signs	Agata Paszke	Recurring role; 14 episodes
2019	The Better Half	Anita	Episode no. 9
2020	The Elements of Sasza – Fire	Renia	3 episodes
2023	BringBackAlice	Alicja Stec	Leading role; 6 episodes
2024	Love Algorithm	Dagmara	Main role; 6 episodes
2024	Śleboda	Majka Śleboda	4 episodes
2025–2026	Family.pl	Sonia	Recurring role; 8 episodes
2025–2026	Pokusa	Inez	Leading role; 14 episodes

=== Radio dramas ===
Year	Title	Role
2025	Tatry. #CoSięStałoZAnnąKos	Karolina

=== Polish-language dubbing ===
Year	Title	Role	Notes
2010	Despicable Me	Edith	Feature film
2010	Home Makeover	Edith	Short film
2013	Despicable Me 2	Edith	Feature film
2017	Despicable Me 3	Edith	Feature film
2017	The Secret Life of Kyle	Edith	Short film
2023	The Flash	Supergirl (Kara Zor-El)	Television series
2024	Damsel	Elodie	Feature film
2025	The Electric State	Michelle Greene	Feature film
