= Emilia Dankwa =

Polish actress (born 2005)

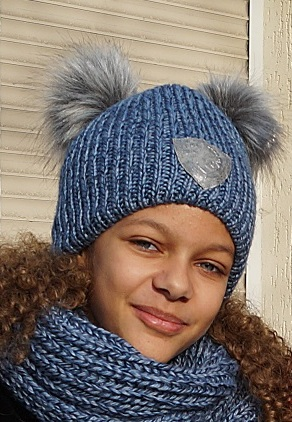
- Dankwa in 2019.
- Born: 16 December 2005 (age 20); Warsaw, Poland
- Occupations: Actress, model
- Years active: 2012–present

Emilia Dankwa (born 16 December 2005; Polish: [ɛˈmi.lja ˈdan.kfa]; English: /ˈdænkwə/) is a television actress and model. She is best known for portraying Zosia, a secondary character in comedy television series Family.pl (2012–2020, 2025).

== Biography ==
Emilia Dankwa was born on 16 December 2005 in Warsaw, Poland. She is a daughter of editor Monika Bekier, and film editor Eryk Dankwa. Her paternal grandfather emigrated from Ghana.

Dankwa begun her acting career with a role in 2012 comedy drama film Being Like Deyna. From 2012 to 2020, she also portrayed Zosia, a secondary character in comedy television series Family.pl, for which she is best known. In 2025, she also starred in its revival continuation. Additionally Dankwa appeared in television series Na krawędzi (2012), True Law (2013), L for Love (2014), The Teacher (2017), and Tylko nie piątek! (2023). She is also a model.

== Filmography ==
Year	Title	Role	Notes
2012	Being Like Deyna	Young Niunia	Feature film
2012	Na krawędzi	Emilka Wolańska	Television series; episode no. 1
2012	True Law	Zaryskis' daughter	Television series; episode no. 13
2012–2020, 2025	Family.pl	Zosia	Television series; recurring role; 100 episodes
2014	L for Love	Julka, Sonia's daughter	Television series; 6 episodes
2014	Close-ups		Feature film
2017	The Teacher	Natalia Ebig	Television series; 5 episodes
2023	Tylko nie piątek!	Woman	Television series; episode: "Odwyk" (no. 13)
2024	Cudowne lata	Herself (guest)	Talk show; 1 episode
