= Sex for Dummies =

- Directed by: Rafal Skalski
- Written by: Marek Baranowski
- Produced by: Klaudiusz Frydrych; Anna Wasniewska-Gill
- Starring: Piotr Adamczyk; Helena Englert; Mikolaj Matczak; Ilona Ostrowska
- Cinematography: Maciej Edelman
- Edited by: Aleksandra Gowin
- Music by: Tomasz Toczkowski
- Production companies: Wonder X Wonder Films
- Distributed by: Kino Świat
- Release dates: 14 October 2025 (Warsaw); 17 October 2025 (Poland)
- Running time: 95 minutes
- Countries: Poland; Lithuania
- Language: Polish

Sex for Dummies (Polish: Seks dla opornych) is a 2025 sex comedy film directed by Rafal Skalski. The plot follows a couple trying to rekindle their desires and explore their desires.

The film was released in Poland on 17 October 2025.

== Cast ==
- Piotr Adamczyk as Grzegorz
- Helena Englert as Dominika
- Mikolaj Matczak as Maks
- Ilona Ostrowska as Basia

== Production ==
Filming began in early 2025, and first photos were released in February 2025.

== Release ==
The film premiered at the Złote Tarasy Multikino at Warsaw on 14 October 2025, and went into general release in Poland on 17 October.
