= Signs (TV series) =

Polish thriller television series

- Polish: Znaki
- Genre: Crime; Thriller
- Created by: Przemysław Hoffmann; Błażej Przygodzki
- Written by: Przemysław Hoffmann; Błażej Przygodzki; Artur Kowalewski; Paulina Murawska; Wojciech Miłoszewski; Jakub Miszczak; Katarzyna B. Miszczuk; Ewa Fita; Marzena Podgórska
- Directed by: Jakub Miszczak; Marcin Ziębiński; Monika Filipowicz
- Starring: Andrzej Konopka; Helena Sujecka; Michał Czernecki
- Composer: Piotr Orłowski
- Country of origin: Poland
- Original language: Polish
- No. of seasons: 2
- No. of episodes: 16

Production
- Executive producer: Paulina Rzazewska-Bednarczyk
- Producers: Jakub Miszczak; Andrzej Muszynski
- Cinematography: Wojciech Todorow
- Editor: Piotr Orłowski
- Running time: 43–48 minutes
- Production companies: ATM Grupa; AXN Central Europe; Telewizja Polsat

Original release
- Network: AXN; Polsat
- Release: 10 October 2018 – 26 May 2020

Signs (Polish: Znaki) is a 2018 Polish crime thriller television series starring Andrzej Konopka, Helena Sujecka, and Michał Czernecki.

== Plot ==
The story takes place in the fictional town of Sowie Doły, in the Owl Mountains. When a woman is murdered at the lake near a local mine, commissioner Michał Trela, the new commander of the town police, who recently moved to Sowie Doły with his daughter, takes on the case. During the investigation, threads from previous years appear, relating both to the recent murder and that of a student a few years before, whose case was never solved.

== Cast and characters ==
- Andrzej Konopka as Commissioner Michał Trela
- Helena Sujecka as Adrianna Nieradka
- Michał Czernecki as Błażej Nieradka
- Piotr Trojan as Krzysztof Sobczyk
- Magdalena Żak as Nina Trela
- Mirosław Kropielnicki as Antoni Paszke
- Mariusz Ostrowski as Targosz
- Andrzej Mastalerz as Marek Zieleniewicz vel Jonasz
- Helena Englert as Agata Paszke
- Małgorzata Hajewska-Krzysztofik as Zofia Bławatska
- Rafał Cieszyński as Priest Roman Śmigielski
- Zbigniew Stryj as Jan Dzikowski
- Robert Gulaczyk as Paweł Piotrowski
- Dobromir Dymecki as Robert Paszke
- Paulina Gałązka as Dorota
- Bianka Pilitowska as Katarzyna Piotrowska
- Karolina Owczarz as Martyna
- Teresa Kwiatkowska as Housekeeper Bogumiła
- Rafał Mohr as Twerski
- Barbara Wypych as Kaja
- Ewa Jakubowicz as Eliza Konieczna
- Krzysztof Zawadzki as Adam
- Sławomir Grzymek as Feliks Szmidt

== Release ==
Signs was released on 10 October 2018 on AXN. A second season came out on 6 May 2020. The series was licensed to Netflix internationally between 2020 and 2025.
