= Maurycy Popiel =

Polish actor (born 1990)

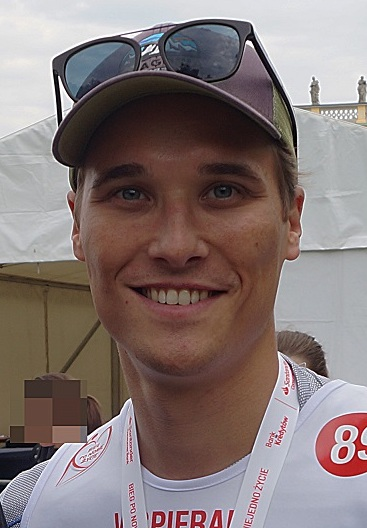
- Popiel in 2019
- Born: 3 January 1990 (age 36); Kraków, Poland
- Occupation: Actor
- Years active: 2005-present

Maurycy Kacper Popiel (born 3 January 1990) is a Polish actor.

== Biography ==
Maurycy is the son of Polish actress Lidia Bogaczówna. In 2012, he completed studies at the Ludwik Solski Academy for the Dramatic Arts in Kraków. He is employed at the Bagatela Theatre since 2012. Actor is best known for his role in the melodrama-war film Warsaw 44 and soap opera M jak miłość. In both productions, he played one of the leading roles.

== Selected filmography ==
- 2005: Szanse finanse
- 2010: Mała matura as Marek
- 2011: Czas honoru (TV series) as Dieter Kugel
- 2013: 2XL (TV series) as bartender
- 2014: Warsaw 44 as Góral
- 2014–present: M jak miłość (TV series) as Aleksander Chodakowski, Marcin's brother
- 2016-2017: Pierwsza miłość (TV series) as Damian
