= Shape of My Heart =

Shape of My Heart may refer to:

- "Shape of My Heart" (Sting song), a 1993 song by Sting from the album Ten Summoner's Tales
- "Shape of My Heart" (Backstreet Boys song), a 2000 song by the Backstreet Boys
- "Shape of My Heart" (Noah and the Whale song), 2008 song by Noah and the Whale, charting 94 in the UK
- Shape of My Heart, a 2009 album by Katia Labèque
- "Shape of My Heart", a 2012 single by Rick Price from The Water's Edge
- The Shape of My Heart, the UK title of God-Shaped Hole, a 2003 novel by Tiffanie DeBartolo
