= Ada Rusowicz =

Polish singer (1944–1991)

- Born: Adrianna Rusowicz; 8 September 1944; Vilnius, Reichskommissariat Ostland
- Died: 1 January 1991 (aged 46); Poznań, Poland
- Occupation: Singer
- Years active: 1963–1980
- Spouse: Wojciech Korda
- Musical career
- Genres: Pop; Rock and roll
- Instrument: Vocals

Adrianna Rusowicz (8 September 1944 – 1 January 1991), known professionally as Ada Rusowicz, was a Polish singer, the vocalist of the band Niebiesko-Czarni.

== Biography ==
Rusowicz was born on 8 September 1944 in Vilnius, but spent her childhood in Dzierzgoń. In 1962 she graduated from high school in the School Complex in Sztum. Then, in Olsztyn, she started teaching as a teacher, at the same time she became interested in music and started working with student music groups. In 1963, she won a distinction at the 2nd Festival of Young Talents in Szczecin, and the following year she auditioned for Czesław Niemen's choir Błękitne Pończochy (or Blue Stockings), which accompanied the band Niebiesko-Czarni.

In 1968, Rusowicz won the title of the most popular singer of the year. In the years 1968–1970, together with Niebiesko-Czarni, she gave concerts in France, Belgium, Yugoslavia, Finland and West Germany. She performed with the ensemble until its dissolution in 1976, and from 1967 she was their soloist. Then she performed with Wojciech Korda in the duo Ada i Korda, but the band was not successful. In 1980, she retired from stage work and devoted several years to family life.

== Personal life and death ==
During the period of cooperation with Błękitne Pończochy, Rusowicz started an affair with Czesław Niemen. Her husband was a guitarist from the band Wojciech Korda, with whom she had two children: Bartłomiej (born 1977) and Anna (born 1983).

On 1 January 1991, Rusowicz returned with her husband and newly met friends from a concert in Warsaw. She was killed as a result of a car accident near Poznań; only Korda survived. She was buried at the Miłostowo Cemetery in Poznań.

== Commemoration ==
In 2012 in Dzierzgoń, in the City Park, a concert hall was named after Rusowicz and a plaque commemorating the singer was unveiled.

By a resolution adopted at the session of the Poznań City Council on 12 July 2016, the square located between Bolesława Krzywoustego, Pleszewska, Brneńska and Anna Jantar streets near the "Posnania" shopping center in the area of the Rataje estate in Poznań was named after Ada Rusowicz.
