= Mateusz Pawłowski =

Polish actor (born 2004)

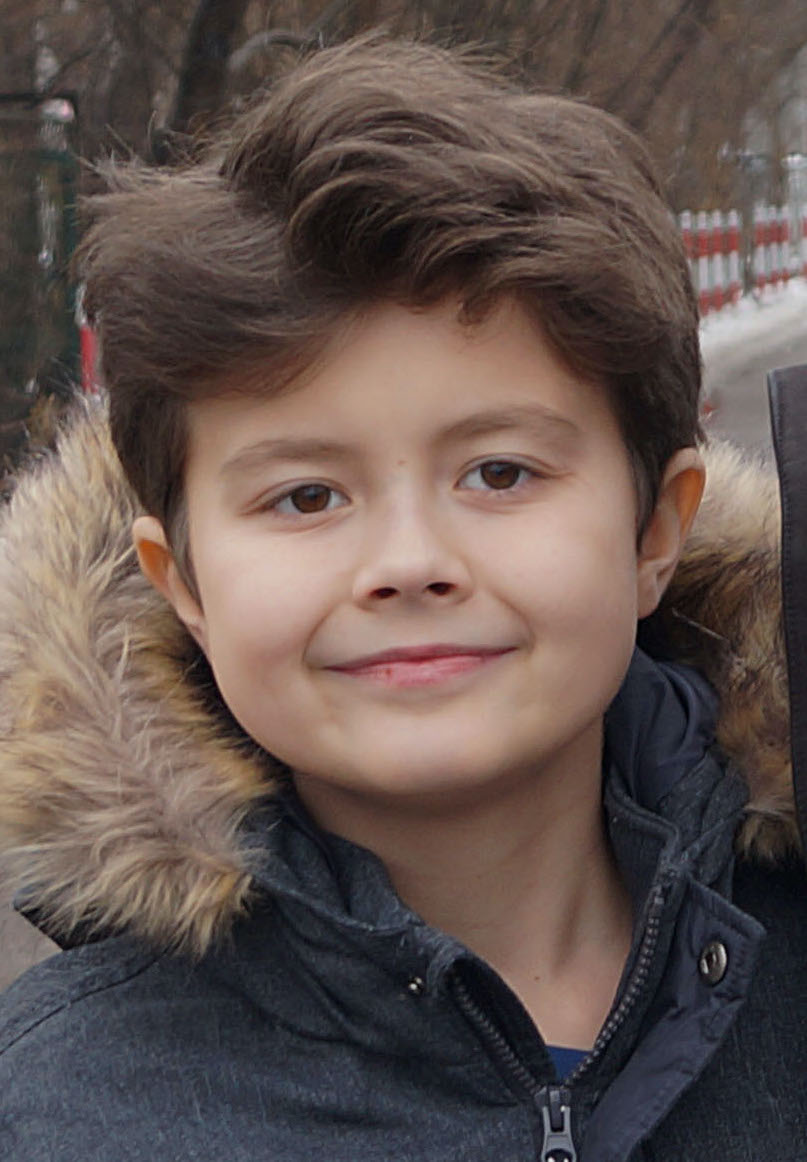
- Mateusz Pawłowski in 2017.
- Born: 3 June 2004 (age 21); Warsaw, Poland
- Occupation: Actor
- Years active: 2011–present

Mateusz Pawłowski (Polish: [maˈtɛ.uʂ pavˈwɔf.ski]; born 3 June 2004) is a Polish television actor. He is best known for portraying Kacper Boski, one of the main characters in the television series Family.pl (2011–2020, 2025).

== Biography ==
Mateusz Pawłowski was born on 3 June 2004 in Warsaw, Poland. He is the son of Katarzyna Majchrzak-Pawłowska, and Mariusz Pawłowski He has a younger sister, Natalia.

In 2008, when he was four years old, he appeared in an episode of children's talent show Mini szansa.

From 2011 to 2020, he portrayed Kacper Boski, one of the main characters in the TVP television series Family.pl. In 2025, he also starred in its revival continuation. From 2012 to 2014, he voiced Krzyś in the animated television series Opowieści kota Śpiocha. In 2017, he portrayed a young Maximilian Kolbe, in a feature film Two Crowns.

== Filmography ==
=== Television series ===
Year	Title	Role	Notes	Ref.
2011–2020, 2025	Family.pl	Kacper Boski	Main role	
2012–2013	Opowieści kota Śpiocha	Krzyś	Main role; voice; 26 episodes	
2012–2015	Kręcimy Rodzinkę.pl	Kacper Boski	Main role	
2013	Boscy w sieci	Kacper Boski	Main role	

=== Film ===
Year	Title	Role	Notes	Ref.
2017	Two Crowns	Young Maximilian Kolbe	Feature film	

=== Television programmes ===
Year	Title	Role	Notes
2008	Mini szansa	Himself	Talent show; 1 episode
2011–2012	Familiada	Himself (contestant)	Game show; 3 episodes
2011–2019	Pytanie na śniadanie	Himself (guest)	Talk show
2015	Hell’s Kitchen. Piekielna kuchnia	Himself (guest)	Game show; 1 episode
2015	Mamy cię!	Himself (contestant)	Game show; episode no. 12
2017	Petersburski Music Show	Himself (co-host)	Television event
2020	Jaka to melodia?	Himself (contestant)	Game show; 1 episode

=== Polish dubbing ===
Year	Title	Role	Notes
2013	Pinocchio	Pinocchio	TV series
2014	Get Santa	Tom	Feature film
