= Ania Rusowicz =

Polish singer (born 1983)

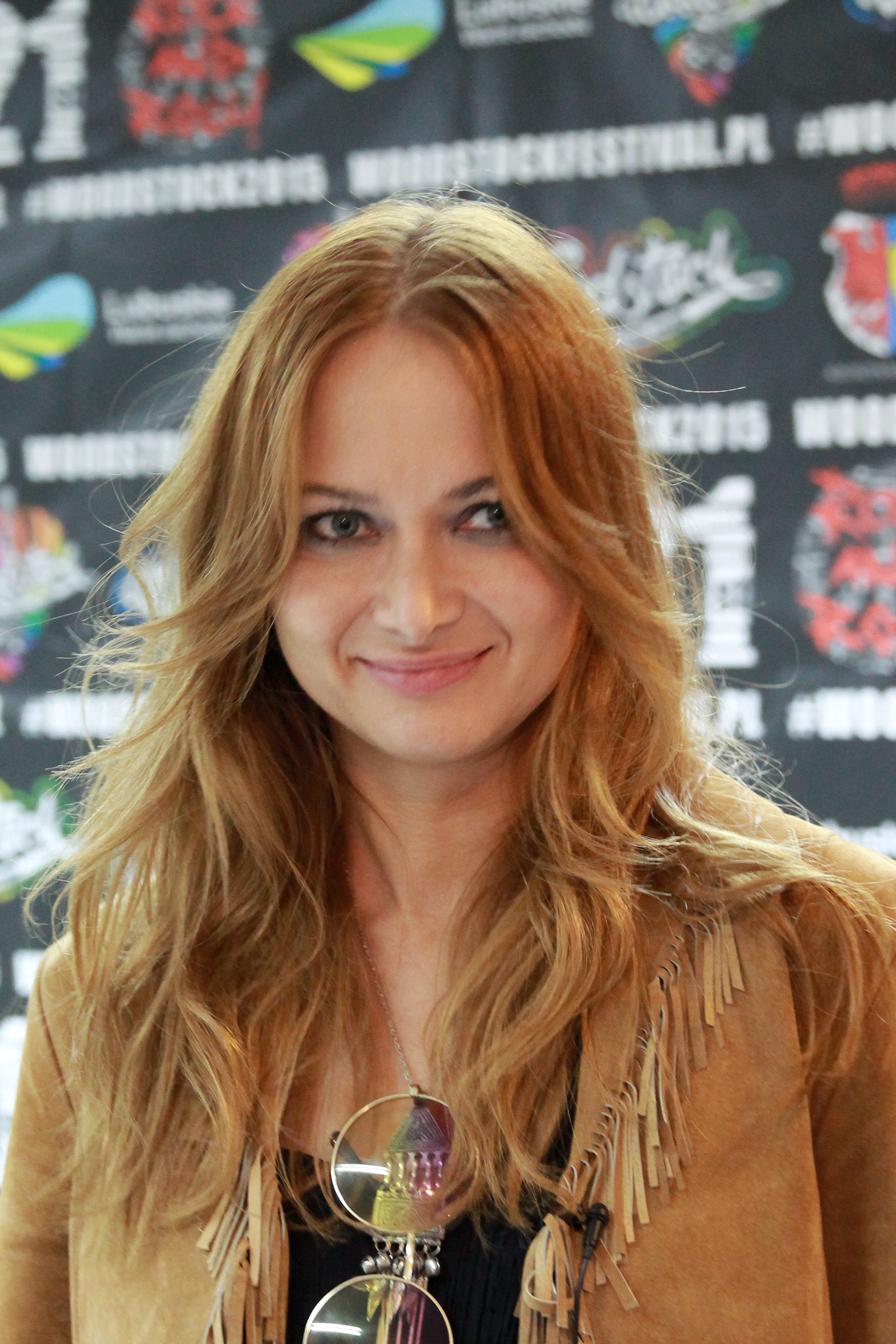
- Rusowicz at the 2015 Woodstock Festival Poland
- Born: Anna Sandra Kędziora; 28 March 1983 (age 43)
- Occupations: Singer; songwriter
- Years active: 2005–
- Spouse: Hubert Gasiul
- Musical career
- Genres: Pop; Blues rock; pop; psychedelic rock; soul
- Instruments: Vocals; keyboard; tambourine
- Labels: Universal Music Polska; Agora

Anna Sandra Rusowicz (born 28 March 1983) is a Polish singer.

From 2005 to 2007, Rusowicz was the vocalist of the band Dezire, with whom she released a studio album entitled Pięć smaków (2005). From 2009 to 2011, she was the vocalist of the band IKA, which she founded with her husband, Hubert Gasiul. A solo artist since 2011, she has released four studio albums: Moje Big-Bit (2011), Genesis (2013), Retronarocze (2016) and Przebudzenie (2019). Since 2017, she is the lead singer of her own band niXes, with which she released a studio album, also entitled niXes (2017).

Rusowicz is a three-time recipient of the Fryderyk award and a recipient of the Superjedynki award.

== Early years ==
Born into a family with musical traditions, Rusowicz is the daughter of Ada Rusowicz and Wojciech Korda. When she was seven years old, her mother was killed in a car accident near Poznań. Then her father moved in with his 13-year-old son Bartłomiej (born 1977), and Anna was brought up by Krystyna, her mother's sister, and Adolf Grynicz. She grew up in Dzierzgoń and then in Bydgoszcz. In her adult life, she adopted her mother's surname, swapping it from her father's surname Kędziora.

After graduating from the 9th Secondary School in Bydgoszcz, she studied i.a. pharmacy (which she did not graduate) and psychology (which she graduated in 2011).

== Music career ==
During her studies, Rusowicz took up music. In 2005, she established cooperation with the band Dezire, with whom in 2006 she took part in the concert Song for Europe 2006, which was the national qualifying for the Eurovision Song Contest. With the song "Good Girl", they took fourth place with a total of 14 points, including the maximum of 12 points from the jury and 2 points from the viewers.

In the following years, together with her husband, Hubert Gasiul, she formed the band IKA. In 2011, they performed in the Polish selections for the Eurovision Song Contest. With the song "Say" they came in 10th and last place, winning 1.76% of the public vote. On 11 June 2011, she performed solo at the 48th National Polish Song Festival in Opole with songs from the repertoire of her mother Ada Rusowicz: "Don't knock on my door", "Big mistake", "Hey, girl, hey" and "Too far you live, dear". On 21 October, she released her debut studio album, entitled Mój Big-Bit. In 2011, she also recorded the single "Flower of Hatred" with the band Czarno-Czarni . On 8 October 2013, she released her second solo studio album entitled Genesis. Also in 2013, she took part in the recording of the song "Orzeł may" for the promotional campaign of Radio Three.

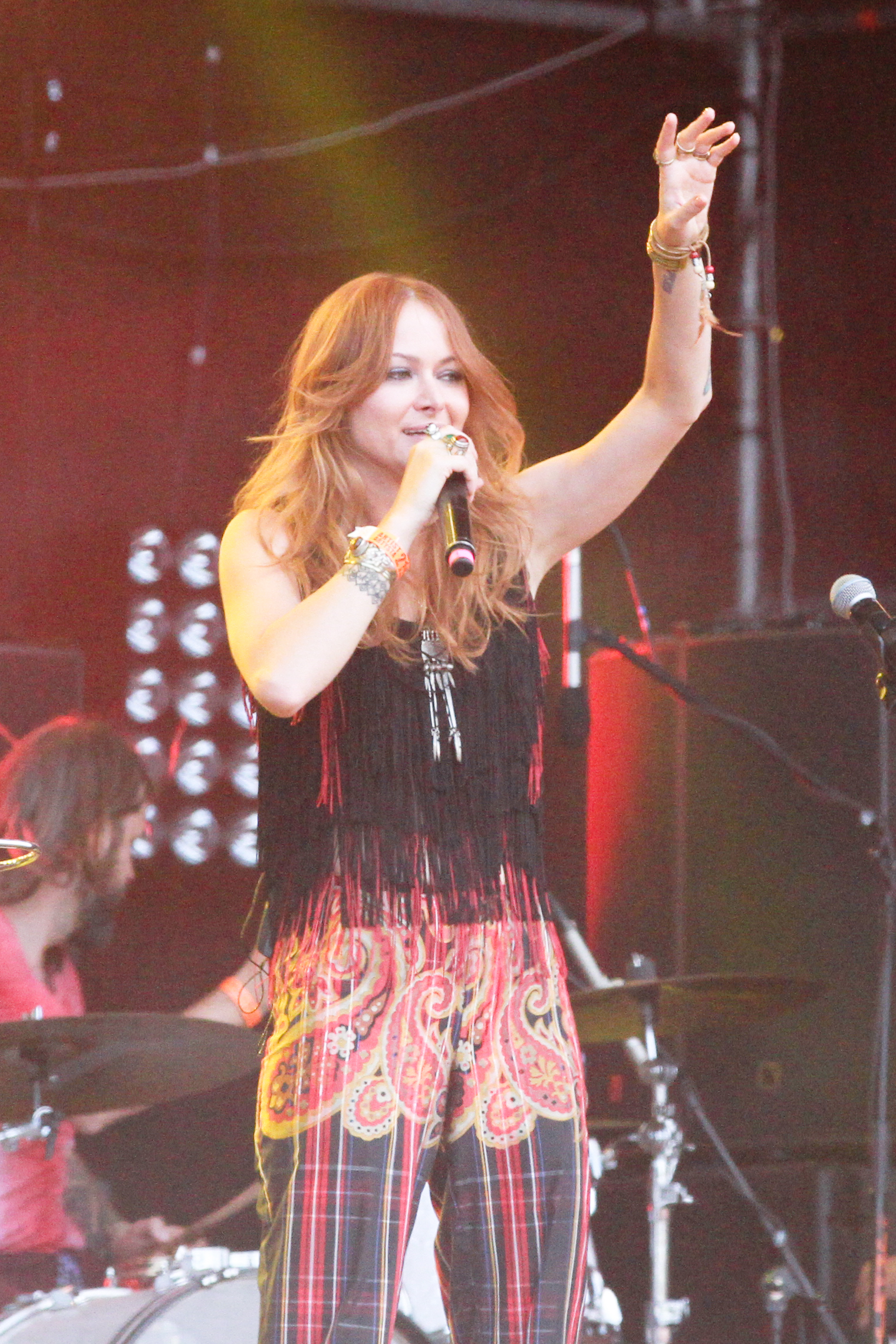
Ania Rusowicz performing at the 2015 Woodstock Festival Poland

In the following years, Rusowicz reached for the repertoire of other performers several times, especially from the 1960s and 1970s, at Przystanek Woodstock and the Jon Lord Memorial. A collection of such recordings, from the repertoire of Led Zeppelin, Jefferson Airplane and Deep Purple were featured on the live album released in December 2015 entitled. Flower Power, which is a recording of the performance at the 2015 Woodstock Festival Poland. In the same year, she was a juror in the TVN talent show Aplauz, applauz! On 9 December 2016, Rusowicz released her third solo studio album entitled Retronarodzenie. In 2019, in a duet with Sławek Uniatowski, she recorded a new version of the hit "Search for me" for the soundtrack to Kordian Piwowarski's film Miszmasz, or kogel-mogel 3. On 25 October, she released her fourth solo studio album Przebudzenie.

In spring 2022, Rusowicz participated in the sixteenth edition of Polsat's entertainment program Twoja twarz brzmi znajomo; after nine episodes, she reached the finals, where she finished in third place.

== Personal life ==
Rusowicz is married to Hubert Gasiul. They have a son, Tytus (born 2017).

== Discography ==
=== Studio albums ===
Year	Album details	Peak chart positions	Sales	Certifications
Year	Album details	POL	Sales	Certifications
2011	Mój Big-Bit: Released: 21 October 2011; Label: Universal Music Polska	12	POL: 15,000+	POL: Gold
2013	Genesis: Released: 8 October 2013; Label: Universal Music Polska	30		
2016	Retronarodzenie: Released: 9 December 2016; Label: Agora SA	–		
2019	Przebudzenie: Released: 25 October 2019; Label: Agora SA	41		
"–" album did not chart

=== EP ===
- To Co Było (2013)

=== Video ===
- Przystanek Woodstock 2015 (2015)

=== Singles ===
- "Ślepa miłość" (2011)
- "Ja i Ty" (2012)
- "Za daleko mieszkasz miły" (2012)
- "Choć rozum śpi" (with Kielich, 2012)
- "Śtróże świateł" (2013)
- "To co było" (2013)
- "Ptaki" (2013)
- "To nie ja" (2014)
- "Czy da się kochać" (2015)
- "W co mam wierzyć" (2017)
- "Szukaj mnie" (with Sławek Uniatowski, 2019)
- "Iść w stronę słońca" (with Steve Nash, 2019)
- "Świecie stój" (2019)

=== Contributions ===
- Krzysztof Kieliszkiewicz – Dziecko szczęścia (2012): "Choć rozum śpi"
- L.U.C, Motion Trio – Nic się nie stało (2013): "8 Przebudzenie - Iluzji Łąka"
- Panny wyklęte: wygnane vol. 1 (2014): "Pieśń Wiktorii"
- Święta bez granic 2014 (2014): "Pastorałka radosna" (with Ania Brachaczek)
- Panny wyklęte: wygnane vol. 2 (2015): "Będziemy Polską" (with Krzysztof Herdzin)
