= Family.pl =

Polish television series

- Created by: Piotr Kupicha
- Written by: Karol Klementewicz; Kuba Wecsile; Patrick Yoka
- Directed by: Patrick Yoka; Adek Drabiński; Marcin Ziębiński; Łukasz Kośmicki; Karol Klementewicz; Kinga Lewińska; Kristoffer Karlsson Rus
- Starring: Małgorzata Kożuchowska; Tomasz Karolak; Maciej Musiał; Adam Zdrójkowski; Mateusz Pawłowski
- Country of origin: Poland
- Original language: Polish
- No. of seasons: 19
- No. of episodes: 314

Production
- Running time: 23 minutes

Original release
- Network: TVP2
- Release: 2 March 2011 – 3 May 2020
- Release: 6 September 2025 – present

Related
- The Parent Family

Family.pl (Polish: Rodzinka.pl), also known as A Polish Family, is a Polish comedy television series directed by Patrick Yoka and based on the Canadian television series The Parent Family. It originally aired from 2 March 2011 to 3 May 2020 on TVP2. Due to its continued popularity, the series was revived, with new episodes airing from 6 September 2025.

== Plot ==
The series follows the Boski family, who live in Warsaw. Natalia works as the head of a women's magazine publishing company, while her husband, Ludwik , is an architect. Together, they raise their three sons: Tomek, Kuba, and Kacper.

== Cast and characters ==
Actor	Role
Małgorzata Kożuchowska	Natalia Boska
Tomasz Karolak	Ludwik Boski
Maciej Musiał	Tomasz Boski
Adam Zdrójkowski	Jakub Boski
Mateusz Pawłowski	Kacper Boski
Agata Kulesza	Marysia
Jacek Braciak	Marek Nawrocki
Olga Kalicka	Magda
Adam Sikora	Filip
Emilia Dankwa	Zosia Zalewska
Daniel Dziorek	Bolo
Wiktoria Gąsiewska	Agata Matuszkiewicz
Julia Wieniawa	Paula
Magdalena Stużyńska-Brauer	Viola
Jan Raubo	Maciek
Witold Sosulski	Antek
Halina Skoczyńska	Janina Lipska
Michał Grudziński	Zenon Lipski
Krzysztof Dracz	Jan
Agnieszka Wosińska	Beata

== Episodes ==
Season	Episodes	Season premiere	Season finale
1	1–26 (26)	2 March 2011	25 May 2011
2	27–52 (26)	7 September 2011	7 December 2011
3	53–78 (26)	7 September 2012	30 November 2012
4	79–104 (26)	1 March 2013	7 June 2013
5	105–130 (26)	6 September 2013	6 December 2013
6	131–156 (26)	6 March 2015	5 June 2015
7	157–169 (13)	11 September 2015	4 December 2015
8	170–182 (13)	4 March 2016	3 June 2016
9	183–195 (13)	2 September 2016	2 December 2016
10	196–208 (13)	3 March 2017	2 June 2017
11	209–225 (17)	8 September 2017	15 December 2017
12	226–239 (14)	2 March 2018	8 June 2018
13	240–252 (13)	14 September 2018	7 December 2018
14	253–265 (13)	8 March 2019	7 June 2019
15	266–278 (13)	8 September 2019	1 December 2019
16	279–287 (9)	1 March 2020	3 May 2020
17	288–300 (13)	6 September 2025	29 November 2025
18	301–313 (13)	28 February 2026	23 May 2026
19	314–326 (13)	12 September 2026	
