= Taniec z gwiazdami season 11 =

Taniec z gwiazdami
- Season 11
- Hosted by: Piotr Gąsowski; Katarzyna Skrzynecka
- Judges: Iwona Pavlović; Piotr Galiński; Beata Tyszkiewicz; Zbigniew Wodecki
- Celebrity winner: Julia Kamińska
- Professional winner: Rafał Maserak
- No. of episodes: 12

Release
- Original network: TVN
- Original release: March 7 – June 13, 2010

Season chronology
- ← Previous; 10 Next → 12

The 11th season of Taniec z Gwiazdami, the Polish edition of Dancing With the Stars, started on March 7, 2010 and ended on June 13, 2010. It was broadcast by TVN. Katarzyna Skrzynecka and Piotr Gąsowski continued as the hosts, and the judges were: Iwona Szymańska-Pavlović, Zbigniew Wodecki, Beata Tyszkiewicz and Piotr Galiński.

On 13 June, Julia Kamińska and her partner Rafał Maserak were crowned the champions.

== Couples ==
Celebrity	Occupation	Professional partner	Status
Przemysław Miarczyński	World Championships Bronze Medalist Sailor	Magdalena Soszyńska-Michno	Eliminated 1st on March 14, 2010
Łukasz Mrozu Mróz	R&B Singer	Aneta Piotrowska	Eliminated 2nd on March 21, 2010
Przemysław Saleta	Boxer	Izabela Janachowska	Eliminated 3rd on March 28, 2010
Aleksandra Szwed	Rodzina zastępcza actress and singer	Robert Rowiński	Eliminated 4th on April 4, 2010
Maciej Friedek	W11 - Wydział śledczy actor and former policeman	Blanka Winiarska	Eliminated 5th on April 25, 2010
Artur Barciś	Film and television actor	Paulina Biernat	Withdrew on May 2, 2010
Oceana	Singer	Przemysław Juszkiewicz	Withdrew on May 9, 2010
Piotr Szwedes	Film and television actor	Anna Głogowska	Eliminated 6th on May 16, 2010
Olga Bołądź	Film and television actress	Łukasz Czarnecki	Eliminated 7th on May 23, 2010
Katarzyna Grochola	Writer	Jan Kliment	Third place on May 30, 2010
Katarzyna Glinka	Barwy szczęścia actress	Stefano Terrazzino	Second place on June 13, 2010
Julia Kamińska	BrzydUla actress	Rafał Maserak	Winners on June 13, 2010

== Scores ==
Couple	Place	1	2	1+2	3	4	5	6	7	8	9	8+9^{1}	10	11	12
Julia & Rafał	1	29	31	60	37	40†	40†	39	40†	34	36+39=75	109	40+40=80†	39+40=79	40+40+40=120
Katarzyna & Stefano	2	28	39†	67	40†	37	39	38	40†	40†	40+40=80†	120†	38+40=78	40+40=80†	40+40+40=120
Katarzyna & Jan	3	19	23	42‡	30	28	33	27‡	23‡	21‡	31+34=65	86‡	26+40=66‡	32+32=64‡	
Olga & Łukasz	4	24	33	57	28	36	29	40†	40†	37	35+39=74	111	36+40=76		
Piotr & Anna	5	27	33	60	31	37	36	39	29	36	32+25=57‡	93			
Oceana & Przemysław	6	37†	38	75†	39	39	40†	39	40†	—					
Artur & Paulina	7	31	32	63	34	31	36	33	33						
Maciej & Blanka	8	26	25	51	31	23	28‡	36							
Aleksandra & Robert	9	30	35	65	38	40†	34								
Przemysław & Izabela	10	21	22‡	43	19‡	20‡									
Łukasz & Aneta	11	15‡	36	51	33										
Przemysław & Magdalena	12	28	29	57											

Red numbers indicate the lowest score for each week.
Green numbers indicate the highest score for each week.
indicates the couple eliminated that week.
indicates the returning couple that finished in the bottom two.
indicates the winning couple of the week.
indicates the runner-up of the week.
indicates the third place couple of the week.
indicates the couple withdrew from the competition.
indicates the couple that would have been eliminated had an elimination taken place.

- ^1 Because of Oceana's withdrawal there was no elimination in Week 8. Week 9 featured a combined score of both Week 8 and Week 9.

Notes:

Week 1: Oceana scored 37 out of 40 on her first dance (Cha Cha Cha). Although Katarzyna Skrzynecka (the host) claimed it was the highest score ever in Week 1, the actual record belongs to Natasza Urbańska who scored 38 on her Cha Cha Cha in Week 1 of Season 10. There was, however, a record in this episode: Łukasz Mrozu Mróz got the lowest score in history of the show, scoring 15 out of 40 for his Cha Cha Cha. Iga Wyrwał also got 15 points for her Jive in Week 3 Season 10. There was no elimination this week.

Week 2: Katarzyna Glinka scored 39 out of 40 for her Quickstep, making it the highest Week 2 score in history of the show. Łukasz Mrozu Mróz made the biggest weekly improvement in history of the show, after scoring 15 points in Week 1 and then 36 points in Week 2. Przemysław Saleta got 22 points for his Rumba, making it the lowest score of the week. Przemysław & Magdalena were eliminated.

Week 3: Katarzyna Glinka received the first perfect score of the season as well as the earliest perfect score in history of the show. Only Mateusz Damięcki, Agata Kulesza, Alan Andersz, Dorota Gardias, Anna Mucha and Natasza Urbańska have scored 40 points in Week 3. Przemysław Saleta got 19 points for his Tango, making it the lowest score of the week. Łukasz & Aneta were eliminated despite being 14 points from the bottom.

Week 4: Julia Kamińska & Aleksandra Szwed got their first perfect scores for the Paso Doble. Przemysław Saleta got 20 points for his Paso Doble, making it the lowest score of the week. Przemysław & Izabela were on the bottom of the leaderboard for the third consecutive week. Przemysław & Izabela were eliminated.

Week 5: Julia Kamińska received her second perfect score for the Viennese Waltz and Oceana received her first perfect score for the Samba. Maciej Friedek got 28 points for his Viennese Waltz, making it the lowest score of the week. Aleksandra & Robert were eliminated despite being 6 points from the bottom.

Week 6: Olga Bołądź received her first perfect score for the Waltz in American Smooth. There was a three-way tie on the second place, with Julia Kamińska, Oceana and Piotr Szwedes all getting 39 out of 40. Katarzyna Grochola got 27 points for her Salsa, making it the lowest score of the week. Oceana announced that she was pregnant, but she decided to continue with participating in the show, having no contraindications to dance. Maciej and Blanka were eliminated despite being 9 points from the bottom.

Week 7: All couples danced to songs from famous movies about dance. Julia Kamińska, Katarzyna Glinka, Olga Bołądź and Oceana all received perfect scores for their dances making a four-way tie on the first place and making it the first episode ever with four celebrities all scoring 40 out of 40. Katarzyna Grochola got 23 points for her Cha-cha-cha, making it the lowest score of the week. Piotr & Anna were eliminated according to a combined jury and audience voting, but Artur & Paulina left the show because of Artur's injury, putting Piotr & Anna back into the competition.

Week 8: All couples danced to the most famous songs of the rock band Queen. Katarzyna Glinka got perfect score for her Rumba. Katarzyna Grochola got 21 points for her Jive, making it the lowest score of the week. Because of an ankle injury, Julia Kamińska had to dance in flat shoes starting from this week until the end of the competition. Oceana's dance was scheduled the last one, but instead of dancing, the singer announced her withdrawal from the show, planning to focus on her pregnancy. She was moved by a standing ovation of the audience and the jury and decided to sing one of her songs. Because of Oceana's withdrawal, there was no elimination this week and the scores were added to the next week ones creating a combined Week 8&9 score. This week marks the first time in history of the show when two celebrities withdrew from the show in two consecutive weeks.

Week 9: All couples danced to songs from famous musicals. Katarzyna Glinka got two perfect scores for her Paso Doble and Foxtrot, having scored 4 perfect scores in a row. Katarzyna & Jan were on the bottom of the leaderboard for the fourth consecutive week. Piotr & Anna were eliminated.

Week 10: Julia Kamińska got two perfect scores for her Waltz and Samba. Katarzyna Grochola got her first and only perfect score for the Tango that moved the audience and judges. Olga & Łukasz were eliminated despite being 10 points from the bottom.

Week 11: Katarzyna Glinka got two perfect scores for her Rumba and Viennese Waltz. Julia Kamińska was in the bottom two for the first time in the competition. Katarzyna & Jan were eliminated.

Week 12: Both Julia Kamińska and Katarzyna Glinka got 120 out of 120 points, making it the third-season finale in a row with both couples getting the highest possible score. Both couples had to perform three dances: their favorite Latin dance, their favorite Ballroom dance and a Freestyle. Although Katarzyna Glinka had a bigger number of audience votes after the first and second round, the eventual winners were Julia Kamińska and Rafał Maserak, having cast 50.88 percent of the votes. This was Rafał Maserak's second win in a row since he won the 10th season with his celebrity partner Anna Mucha. This is the third time the season's winner was on the third place on the judges' general scoreboard and the fifth time the winner was not on the first place according to the judges' scoreboard.

== Average chart ==
Rank by average	Place	Couple	Average	Total	Best Score	Worst Score
1.	6.	Oceana & Przemysław Juszkiewicz	38.9	272	40	37
2.	2.	Katarzyna Glinka & Stefano Terrazzino	38.8	659	40	28
3.	1.	Julia Kamińska & Rafał Maserak	37.9	644	40	29
4.	9.	Aleksandra Szwed & Robert Rowiński	35.4	177	40	30
5.	4.	Olga Bołądź & Łukasz Czarnecki	34.8	417	40	24
6.	7.	Artur Barciś & Paulina Biernat	32.9	230	36	31
7.	5.	Piotr Szwedes & Anna Głogowska	32.5	325	39	25
8.	12.	Przemysław Miarczyński & Magdalena Soszyńska-Michno	28.5	57	29	28
8.	3.	Katarzyna Grochola & Jan Kliment	28.5	399	40	19
10.	8.	Maciej Friedek & Blanka Winiarska	28.2	169	36	23
11.	11.	Mrozu & Aneta Piotrowska	28.0	84	36	15
12.	10.	Przemysław Saleta & Izabela Janachowska	20.5	82	22	19
All couples			34	3517		

== Average dance chart ==
Couples	Averages	Best Dances	Worst Dances
Oceana & Przemysław	38.9	Samba, Waltz (40)	Cha-Cha-Cha (37)
Katarzyna & Stefano	38.8	Jive (twice), Tango (twice), Rumba (twice), Paso Doble, Foxtrot, Quickstep, Viennese Waltz, Freestyle (40)	Cha-Cha-Cha (28)
Julia & Rafał	37.9	Paso Doble (twice), Viennese Waltz, Jive, Samba, Waltz (twice), Quickstep, Freestyle (40)	Waltz (29)
Aleksandra & Robert	35.4	Paso Doble (40)	Waltz (30)
Olga & Łukasz	34.8	Waltz in American Smooth, Salsa, Foxtrot (40)	Cha-Cha-Cha (24)
Artur & Paulina	32.9	Samba (36)	Cha-Cha-Cha, Foxtrot (31)
Piotr & Anna	32.5	Waltz in American Smooth (39)	Cha-Cha-Cha (25)
Katarzyna & Jan	28.5	Tango (40)	Waltz (19)
Przemysław & Magdalena	28.5	Rumba (29)	Waltz (28)
Maciej & Blanka	28.2	Salsa (36)	Paso Doble (23)
Łukasz & Aneta	28.0	Quickstep (36)	Cha-Cha-Cha (15)
Przemysław & Izabela	20.5	Rumba (22)	Tango (19)

== Highest and lowest scoring performances ==
The best and worst performances in each dance according to the judges' marks are as follows:

Dance	Best dancer	Best score	Worst dancer	Worst score
Cha-Cha-Cha	Oceana	37	Mrozu	15
Waltz	Julia Kamińska; Oceana	40	Katarzyna Grochola	19
Quickstep	Julia Kamińska; Katarzyna Glinka	40	Katarzyna Grochola	31
Rumba	Katarzyna Glinka	40	Przemysław Saleta	22
Jive	Julia Kamińska; Katarzyna Glinka	40	Katarzyna Grochola	21
Tango	Katarzyna Glinka; Katarzyna Grochola	40	Przemysław Saleta	19
Foxtrot	Katarzyna Glinka; Olga Bołądź	40	Artur Barciś	31
Paso Doble	Julia Kamińska; Katarzyna Glinka; Aleksandra Szwed	40	Przemysław Saleta	20
Samba	Julia Kamińska; Oceana	40	Katarzyna Grochola	26
Viennese Waltz	Julia Kamińska; Katarzyna Glinka	40	Maciej Friedek	28
Salsa	Olga Bołądź	40	Katarzyna Grochola	27
Waltz in American Smooth	Olga Bołądź	40	Artur Barciś	33
Freestyle	Julia Kamińska; Katarzyna Glinka	40		

== Episodes ==
Individual judges scores in charts below (given in parentheses) are listed in this order from left to right: Iwona Szymańska-Pavlović, Zbigniew Wodecki, Beata Tyszkiewicz and Piotr Galiński.

=== Week 1 ===
Running order

Couple	Score	Style	Music
Przemysław & Izabela	21 (4,6,8,3)	Waltz	"It Is You (I Have Loved)" — Dana Glover
Olga & Łukasz	24 (4,7,9,4)	Cha-Cha-Cha	"Chain of Fools" — Aretha Franklin
Przemysław & Magdalena	28 (6,7,9,6)	Waltz	"Smile" — Nat King Cole
Katarzyna & Stefano	28 (5,8,9,6)	Cha-Cha-Cha	"La Luna" — Belinda Carlisle
Maciej & Blanka	26 (3,8,9,6)	Waltz	"If You Don't Know Me By Now" — Simply Red
Łukasz & Aneta	15 (1,5,8,1)	Cha-Cha-Cha	"Million Dollar Bill" — Whitney Houston
Aleksandra & Robert	30 (6,8,9,7)	Waltz	"Nature Boy" — Nat Cole
Piotr & Anna	27 (5,7,9,6)	Cha-Cha-Cha	"American Pie" — Don McLean
Katarzyna & Jan	19 (2,7,8,2)	Waltz	"Time is a Healer" — Eva Cassidy
Artur & Paulina	31 (6,8,10,7)	Cha-Cha-Cha	"Sugar, Sugar" — Jeff Barry & Andy Kim
Julia & Rafał	29 (6,8,9,6)	Waltz	"When I Need You" — Rod Stewart
Oceana & Przemysław	37 (8,9,10,10)	Cha-Cha-Cha	"Cry Cry" – Oceana

=== Week 2 ===
Running order

Couple	Score	Style	Music
Aleksandra & Robert	35 (7,9,10,9)	Rumba	"Careless Whisper" — Wham!
Artur & Paulina	32 (6,10,10,6)	Quickstep	"Titina" — Charlie Chaplin
Maciej & Blanka	25 (5,7,8,5)	Rumba	"Cherish" – Kool & the Gang
Oceana & Przemysław	38 (8,10,10,10)	Quickstep	"Le Jazz Hot!" — Julie Andrews (from Victor Victoria)
Przemysław & Magdalena	29 (6,8,9,6)	Rumba	"Two People" — Tina Turner
Piotr & Anna	33 (5,10,10,8)	Quickstep	Theme song from Bewitched
Katarzyna & Jan	23 (3,8,8,4)	Rumba	"Trudno tak" — Edyta Bartosiewicz & Krzysztof Krawczyk
Łukasz & Aneta	36 (8,9,10,9)	Quickstep	"Suddenly I See" — KT Tunstall
Julia & Rafał	31 (6,9,9,7)	Rumba	"I Want to Know What Love Is" — Foreigner
Olga & Łukasz	33 (7,9,10,7)	Quickstep	"Baby Wants a Diamond Ring" — Squirrel Nut Zippers
Przemysław & Izabela	22 (3,8,9,2)	Rumba	"You Can Leave Your Hat On" — Joe Cocker
Katarzyna & Stefano	39 (9,10,10,10)	Quickstep	"Fat Sam's Grand Slam" – Paul Williams (from Bugsy Malone)

=== Week 3 ===
Running order

Couple	Score	Style	Music
Łukasz & Aneta	33 (7,8,10,8)	Jive	"Tell Her About It" — Billy Joel
Maciej & Blanka	31 (7,8,9,7)	Tango	"Thunderball" — Tom Jones
Piotr & Anna	31 (6,9,9,7)	Jive	"Jailhouse Rock" — Elvis Presley
Aleksandra & Robert	38 (8,10,10,10)	Tango	"Sombras" — Roger Desbois
Olga & Łukasz	28 (5,8,9,6)	Jive	"Crocodile Rock" — Elton John
Przemysław & Izabela	19 (2,8,8,1)	Tango	"Let's Dance" — David Bowie
Katarzyna & Stefano	40 (10,10,10,10)	Jive	"Hit the Road Jack" — Ray Charles
Julia & Rafał	37 (8,10,9,10)	Tango	"Toxic" — Britney Spears
Oceana & Przemysław	39 (9,10,10,10)	Jive	"You Can't Hurry Love" — The Supremes
Katarzyna & Jan	30 (5,9,9,7)	Tango	"Tango Kat" — Kabaret Starszych Panów
Artur & Paulina	34 (7,10,10,7)	Jive	"Reet Petite" — Jackie Wilson

=== Week 4 ===
Running order

Couple	Score	Style	Music
Artur & Paulina	31 (6,9,10,6)	Foxtrot	"I Wanna Be Loved By You" — Marilyn Monroe
Julia & Rafał	40 (10,10,10,10)	Paso Doble	"El Conquistador" — Jose Esparza
Olga & Łukasz	36 (8,10,10,8)	Foxtrot	"Makin' Whoopee" — Eddie Cantor
Przemysław & Izabela	20 (2,7,9,2)	Paso Doble	"Money for Nothing" — Dire Straits
Piotr & Anna	37 (8,10,10,9)	Foxtrot	"These Foolish Things" — Rod Stewart
Katarzyna & Jan	28 (5,9,9,5)	Paso Doble	"Ayo Mi Son" — Legin Resel
Oceana & Przemysław	39 (9,10,10,10)	Foxtrot	"Haven't Met You Yet" — Michael Bublé
Aleksandra & Robert	40 (10,10,10,10)	Paso Doble	"Another Brick in the Wall" — Pink Floyd
Katarzyna & Stefano	37 (7,10,10,10)	Foxtrot	"Baby I'm a Fool" — Melody Gardot
Maciej & Blanka	23 (4,7,8,4)	Paso Doble	"Are You Gonna Go My Way" — Lenny Kravitz

=== Week 5 ===
Running order

Couple	Score	Style	Music
Katarzyna & Stefano	39 (10,10,10,9)	Samba	"Whenever Wherever" — Shakira
Aleksandra & Robert	34 (8,9,9,8)	Viennese Waltz	"You'll Never Walk Alone" from Carousel
Oceana & Przemysław	40 (10,10,10,10)	Samba	"One Note Samba" — Antonio Carlos Jobim
Katarzyna & Jan	33 (6,9,10,8)	Viennese Waltz	"The Way It Used to Be" — Engelbert Humperdinck
Olga & Łukasz	29 (6,8,9,6)	Samba	"All Night Long (All Night)" — Lionel Richie
Maciej & Blanka	28 (5,9,9,5)	Viennese Waltz	"Still Loving You" — Scorpions
Piotr & Anna	36 (8,9,10,9)	Samba	"Mujer Latina" — Thalía
Julia & Rafał	40 (10,10,10,10)	Viennese Waltz	"Cryin'" — Aerosmith
Artur & Paulina	36 (8,10,10,8)	Samba	"Mas Que Nada" — Jorge Ben

=== Week 6 ===
Running order

Couple	Score	Style	Music
Oceana & Przemysław	39 (9,10,10,10)	Salsa	"Hot Hot Hot" — Arrow
Piotr & Anna	39 (9,10,10,10)	Waltz in American Smooth	"What A Wonderful World" — Louis Armstrong
Katarzyna & Jan	27 (4,8,10,5)	Salsa	"Mi Mulata" — Frankie Negron
Artur & Paulina	33 (7,9,9,8)	Waltz in American Smooth	"I Will Always Love You" — Dolly Parton
Maciej & Blanka	36 (8,9,10,9)	Salsa	"Pasame El Trapito Aqui" — Son Café
Olga & Łukasz	40 (10,10,10,10)	Waltz in American Smooth	"God Give Me Strength" — Elvis Costello & Burt Bacharach
Julia & Rafał	39 (9,10,10,10)	Salsa	"Mambo Gozon" — Tito Puente
Katarzyna & Stefano	38 (9,10,10,9)	Waltz in American Smooth	"My Heart Will Go On" — Celine Dion

=== Week 7: Dance Movies Themes Week ===
Running order

Couple	Score	Style	Music	Movie
Piotr & Anna	29 (5,8,10,6)	Rumba	"Hungry Eyes" — Eric Carmen	Dirty Dancing
Katarzyna & Jan	23 (3,8,10,2)	Cha-Cha-Cha	"Night Fever" — Bee Gees	Saturday Night Fever
Oceana & Przemysław	40 (10,10,10,10)	Waltz	"Shall We Dance"	Shall We Dance
Artur & Paulina	33 (6,10,10,7)	Rumba	"She's Like the Wind" — Patrick Swayze	Dirty Dancing
Julia & Rafał	40 (10,10,10,10)	Jive	"Footloose" — Kenny Loggins	Footloose
Katarzyna & Stefano	40 (10,10,10,10)	Tango	"Así Se Baila El Tango" — Veronica Verdier	Take the Lead
Olga & Łukasz	40 (10,10,10,10)	Salsa	"Puerto Rico" — Bobby Caldwell, Marisela Esqueda, Michael Sembello, H. Wilkins, Mongo Santamaría, Charlie Palmieri, The Edwin Hawkins Singers	Salsa

=== Week 8: Queen Week ===
Running order

Couple	Score	Style	Music
Katarzyna & Jan	21 (2,8,10,1)	Jive	"Crazy Little Thing Called Love" — Queen
Piotr & Anna	36 (8,10,10,8)	Paso Doble	"Another One Bites the Dust" — Queen
Olga & Łukasz	37 (9,9,10,9)	Tango	"Living on My Own" — Queen
Katarzyna & Stefano	40 (10,10,10,10)	Rumba	"Heaven for Everyone" — Queen
Julia & Rafał	34 (8,9,9,8)	Cha-Cha-Cha	"I Want to Break Free" — Queen
Katarzyna & Jan; Piotr & Anna; Olga & Łukasz; Katarzyna & Stefano; Julia & Rafał	N/A	Group Viennese Waltz	"We Are The Champions" — Queen

=== Week 9: Musical Theme Week ===
Running order

Couple	Score	Style	Music	Musical
Olga & Łukasz	35 (8,9,9,9)	Rumba	"I Don't Know How to Love Him" – Yvonne Elliman	Jesus Christ Superstar
Olga & Łukasz	39 (9,10,10,10)	Quickstep	"Donna/Hashish"	Hair
Katarzyna & Jan	31 (6,8,10,7)	Quickstep	"Cabaret" — Liza Minnelli	Cabaret
Katarzyna & Jan	34 (7,10,10,7)	Rumba	"Your Song" — Elton John	Moulin Rouge
Piotr & Anna	32 (7,9,9,7)	Tango	"The Phantom of the Opera" — Andrew Lloyd Webber	The Phantom of the Opera
Piotr & Anna	25 (4,9,9,3)	Cha-Cha-Cha	"Summer Nights" — John Travolta & Olivia Newton-John	Grease
Katarzyna & Stefano	40 (10,10,10,10)	Paso Doble	"Heaven on Their Minds"—Murray Head	Jesus Christ Superstar
Katarzyna & Stefano	40 (10,10,10,10)	Foxtrot	"All That Jazz" — Liza Minnelli	Chicago
Julia & Rafał	36 (9,9,9,9)	Foxtrot	"Singin' in the Rain" — Gene Kelly	Singin' in the Rain
Julia & Rafał	39 (9,10,10,10)	Rumba	"I Have a Dream" — ABBA	Mamma Mia!

=== Week 10 ===
Running order

Couple	Score	Style	Music
Katarzyna & Jan	26 (5,8,10,3)	Samba	"Soul Bossa Nova" – Quincy Jones
Katarzyna & Jan	40 (10,10,10,10)	Tango	"Ole Guapa" — Anton Malando
Olga & Łukasz	36 (8,9,10,9)	Paso Doble	"Arriba, Arriba" — Claudio Novelli
Olga & Łukasz	40 (10,10,10,10)	Foxtrot	"A Wink and a Smile" — Harry Connick Jr.
Julia & Rafał	40 (10,10,10,10)	Samba	"Aquarela do Brasil" — Ary Barroso
Julia & Rafał	40 (10,10,10,10)	Waltz	"Memory" — Andrew Lloyd Webber
Katarzyna & Stefano	38 (9,9,10,10)	Salsa	"Ran Kan Kan" — Tito Puente
Katarzyna & Stefano	40 (10,10,10,10)	Quickstep	"Why Don't You Do Right?" — Kansas Joe McCoy / "Hey! Pachuco!" (from The Mask)

=== Week 11 ===
Running order

Couple	Score	Style	Music
Julia & Rafał	39 (9,10,10,10)	Salsa	"Tres Gotas De Agua Bendita" – Gloria Estefan
Julia & Rafał	40 (10,10,10,10)	Quickstep	"You're the One That I Want" — John Travolta & Olivia Newton-John
Katarzyna & Jan	32 (5,10,10,7)	Foxtrot	"On the Sunny Side of the Street" — Jimmy McHugh
Katarzyna & Jan	32 (7,9,10,6)	Paso Doble	"El Gato Montes" — Manuel Penella
Katarzyna & Stefano	40 (10,10,10,10)	Rumba	"Shape of My Heart" – Sting
Katarzyna & Stefano	40 (10,10,10,10)	Viennese Waltz	"Sous le ciel de Paris" — Edith Piaf

=== Week 12: Final ===
Running order

Couple	Score	Style	Music
Katarzyna & Stefano	40 (10,10,10,10)	Jive	"Hit the Road Jack" — Ray Charles
Katarzyna & Stefano	40 (10,10,10,10)	Tango	"Así Se Baila El Tango" — Veronica Verdier
Katarzyna & Stefano	40 (10,10,10,10)	Freestyle	"My Immortal" — Evanescence
Julia & Rafał	40 (10,10,10,10)	Paso Doble	"El Conquistador" — Jose Esparza
Julia & Rafał	40 (10,10,10,10)	Waltz	"Memory" — Andrew Lloyd Webber
Julia & Rafał	40 (10,10,10,10)	Freestyle	"Lux Æterna" — Clint Mansell

Another Dances

Couple	Style	Music
Katarzyna & Jan	Tango	"Ole Guapa" — Anton Malando
Olga & Łukasz	Waltz in American Smooth	"God Give Me Strength" — Elvis Costello & Burt Bacharach
Piotr & Anna	Samba	"Mujer Latina" — Thalía
Artur & Paulina	Waltz in American Smooth	"I Will Always Love You" — Dolly Parton
Maciej & Blanka	Salsa	"Pasame El Trapito Aqui" — Son Café
Aleksandra & Robert	Paso Doble	"Another Brick in the Wall" — Pink Floyd
Przemysław & Izabela	Tango	"Let's Dance" — David Bowie
Łukasz & Aneta	Jive	"Tell Her About It" — Billy Joel
Przemysław & Magdalena	Rumba	"Two People" — Tina Turner
Anna Mucha & Rafał Maserak (10th Edition Winner)	Viennese Waltz	"Noce i dnie" — Waldemar Kazanecki (from Noce i dnie)
Przemysław & Magdalena; Łukasz & Aneta; Przemysław & Izabela; Aleksandra & Robert; Maciej & Blanka; Piotr & Anna; Olga & Łukasz; Katarzyna & Jan; Przemysław Juszkiewicz; Paulina Biernat	Group Freestyle	Let's Dance

== Dance chart ==
The celebrities and professional partners danced one of these routines for each corresponding week.

- Week 1: Cha-Cha-Cha or Waltz
- Week 2: Rumba or Quickstep
- Week 3: Jive or Tango
- Week 4: Paso Doble or Foxtrot
- Week 5: Samba or Viennese Waltz
- Week 6: Salsa or Waltz in American Smooth
- Week 7: One unlearned dance (Dance Movies Week)
- Week 8: One unlearned dance & Group Viennese Waltz (Queen Week)
- Week 9: One unlearned & one repeated dance (Musicals Week)
- Week 10: One unlearned Latin dance & one repeated Ballroom dance
- Week 11: Final unlearned Ballroom dance & one repeated Latin dance
- Week 12: Favorite Latin dance, favorite Ballroom dance & Freestyle

Couple	1	2	3	4	5	6	7	8		9		10		11		12		
Julia & Rafał	Waltz	Rumba	Tango	Paso Doble	Viennese Waltz	Salsa	Jive	Cha-cha-cha	Group Viennese Waltz	Foxtrot	Rumba	Samba	Waltz	Salsa	Quickstep	Paso Doble	Waltz	Freestyle
Katarzyna & Stefano	Cha-cha-cha	Quickstep	Jive	Foxtrot	Samba	Waltz in American Smooth	Tango	Rumba	Group Viennese Waltz	Paso Doble	Foxtrot	Salsa	Quickstep	Rumba	Viennese Waltz	Jive	Tango	Freestyle
Katarzyna & Jan	Waltz	Rumba	Tango	Paso Doble	Viennese Waltz	Salsa	Cha-cha-cha	Jive	Group Viennese Waltz	Quickstep	Rumba	Samba	Tango	Foxtrot	Paso Doble			Tango
Olga & Łukasz	Cha-cha-cha	Quickstep	Jive	Foxtrot	Samba	Waltz in American Smooth	Salsa	Tango	Group Viennese Waltz	Rumba	Quickstep	Paso Doble	Foxtrot					Waltz in American Smooth
Piotr & Anna	Cha-cha-cha	Quickstep	Jive	Foxtrot	Samba	Waltz in American Smooth	Rumba	Paso Doble	Group Viennese Waltz	Tango	Cha-cha-cha							Samba
Oceana & Przemysław	Cha-cha-cha	Quickstep	Jive	Foxtrot	Samba	Salsa	Waltz	Tango	Group Viennese Waltz									
Artur & Paulina	Cha-cha-cha	Quickstep	Jive	Foxtrot	Samba	Waltz in American Smooth	Rumba											Waltz in American Smooth
Maciej & Blanka	Waltz	Rumba	Tango	Paso Doble	Viennese Waltz	Salsa												Salsa
Aleksandra & Robert	Waltz	Rumba	Tango	Paso Doble	Viennese Waltz													Paso Doble
Przemysław & Izabela	Waltz	Rumba	Tango	Paso Doble														Tango
Łukasz & Aneta	Cha-cha-cha	Quickstep	Jive															Jive
Przemysław & Magdalena	Waltz	Rumba																Rumba

Highest scoring dance
Lowest scoring dance
Performed, but not scored
Not performed due to withdrawal

== Episode results ==
Order	Week 1	Week 2	Week 3	Week 4	Week 5	Week 6	Week 7	Week 8	Week 9	Week 10	Week 11	Week 12 Final
1	Oceana & Przemysław	Katarzyna & Stefano	Katarzyna & Stefano	Julia & Rafał	Julia & Rafał	Julia & Rafał	Katarzyna & Stefano	Katarzyna & Stefano	Katarzyna & Stefano	Julia & Rafał	Katarzyna & Stefano	Julia & Rafał
2	Julia & Rafał	Oceana & Przemysław	Julia & Rafał	Katarzyna & Stefano	Oceana & Przemysław	Olga & Łukasz	Julia & Rafał	Julia & Rafal	Julia & Rafał	Katarzyna & Stefano	Julia & Rafał	Katarzyna & Stefano
3	Artur & Paulina	Julia & Rafał	Artur & Paulina	Oceana & Przemysław	Piotr & Anna	Katarzyna & Stefano	Olga & Łukasz	Olga & Lukasz	Olga & Łukasz	Katarzyna & Jan	Katarzyna & Jan	
4	Maciej & Blanka	Artur & Paulina	Katarzyna & Jan	Aleksandra & Robert	Katarzyna & Stefano	Piotr & Anna	Oceana & Przemysław	Katarzyna & Jan	Katarzyna & Jan	Olga & Łukasz		
5	Aleksandra & Robert	Łukasz & Aneta	Maciej & Blanka	Maciej & Blanka	Katarzyna & Jan	Oceana & Przemysław	Katarzyna & Jan	Piotr & Anna	Piotr & Anna			
6	Katarzyna & Stefano	Maciej & Blanka	Aleksandra & Robert	Katarzyna & Jan	Maciej & Blanka	Katarzyna & Jan	Artur & Paulina	Oceana & Przemysław				
7	Katarzyna & Jan	Olga & Łukasz	Oceana & Przemysław	Artur & Paulina	Olga & Łukasz	Artur & Paulina	Piotr & Anna					
8	Piotr & Anna	Aleksandra & Robert	Piotr & Anna	Olga & Łukasz	Artur & Paulina	Maciej & Blanka						
9	Przemysław & Magdalena	Katarzyna & Jan	Przemysław & Izabela	Piotr & Anna	Aleksandra & Robert							
10	Łukasz & Aneta	Piotr & Anna	Olga & Łukasz	Przemysław & Izabela								
11	Przemysław & Izabela	Przemysław & Izabela	Łukasz & Aneta									
12	Olga & Łukasz	Przemysław & Magdalena	'									

This couple came in first place with the judges.
This couple came in first place with the judges and gained the highest number of viewers' votes.
This couple gained the highest number of viewers' votes.
This couple came in last place with the judges.
This couple came in last place with the judges and was eliminated.
This couple was eliminated.
This couple withdrew from the competition.
This couple would have been eliminated but was not eliminated due to other couple's withdrawal.
This couple won the competition.
This couple came in second in the competition.
This couple came in third in the competition.

== Audience voting results ==
The percentage of votes cast by a couple in a particular week is given in parentheses.

Order	Week 1	Week 2	Week 3	Week 4	Week 5	Week 6	Week 7	Week 8&9	Week 10	Week 11	Week 12 Final
1	Julia & Rafał (24.48)	Julia & Rafał (20.84)	Julia & Rafał (16.22)	Julia & Rafał (17.64)	Julia & Rafał (23.27)	Julia & Rafał (21.64)	Katarzyna & Stefano (28.24)	Julia & Rafał (31.2)	Julia & Rafał (35.66)	Katarzyna & Stefano (49.11)	Julia & Rafał (50.88)
2	Maciej & Blanka (14.78)	Maciej & Blanka (14.9)	Katarzyna & Jan (15.89)	Maciej & Blanka (14.39)	Maciej & Blanka (16.67)	Katarzyna & Stefano (19.64)	Julia & Rafał (18.61)	Katarzyna & Stefano (29.82)	Katarzyna & Stefano (29.95)	Julia & Rafał (38.61)	Katarzyna & Stefano (49.12)
3	Oceana & Przemysław (11.62)	Artur & Paulina (12.3)	Katarzyna & Stefano (13.03)	Katarzyna & Jan (12.35)	Katarzyna & Jan (11.25)	Katarzyna & Jan (15.52)	Katarzyna & Jan (14.9)	Katarzyna & Jan (17.53)	Katarzyna & Jan (18.74)	Katarzyna & Jan (12.28)	
4	Artur & Paulina (9.98)	Katarzyna & Jan (11.3)	Maciej & Blanka (11.06)	Katarzyna & Stefano (11.11)	Olga & Łukasz (11.02)	Olga & Łukasz (13.58)	Olga & Łukasz (14.19)	Olga & Łukasz (11.19)	Olga & Łukasz (15.65)		
5	Katarzyna & Jan (8.31)	Katarzyna & Stefano (7.95)	Artur & Paulina (10.24)	Artur & Paulina (8.96)	Piotr & Anna (10.99)	Artur & Paulina (10.46)	Artur & Paulina (10.75)	Piotr & Anna (10.26)			
6	Łukasz & Aneta (7.6)	Oceana & Przemysław (7.72)	Przemysław & Izabela (9.39)	Oceana & Przemysław (8.44)	Katarzyna & Stefano (8.51)	Maciej & Blanka (9.92)	Oceana & Przemysław (7.05)				
7	Katarzyna & Stefano (6.76)	Łukasz & Aneta (5.7)	Olga & Łukasz (6.22)	Olga & Łukasz (7.76)	Oceana & Przemysław (7.92)	Piotr & Anna (4.83)	Piotr & Anna (6.26)				
8	Aleksandra & Robert (6.35)	Przemysław & Izabela (4.37)	Aleksandra & Robert (5.75)	Przemysław & Izabela (7.4)	Artur & Paulina (7.06)	Oceana & Przemysław (4.41)					
9	Przemysław & Izabela (3.19)	Olga & Łukasz (4.34)	Piotr & Anna (4.69)	Aleksandra & Robert (6.53)	Aleksandra & Robert (3.31)						
10	Piotr & Anna (2.65)	Aleksandra & Robert (4.33)	Oceana & Przemysław (3.92)	Piotr & Anna (5.42)							
11	Przemysław & Magdalena (2.58)	Piotr & Anna (3.53)	Łukasz & Aneta (3.59)								
12	Olga & Łukasz (1.7)	Przemysław & Magdalena (2.72)									

== Guest performances ==
Episode	Date	Singer/Star	Song	Dancer
1	March 7, 2010	Queensberry	"Hello"	–
2	March 14, 2010	Emmanuelle Seigner	"Dingue"	Group VOLT
3	March 21, 2010	Marcin Wyrostek	"Libertango"	Krzysztof Hulboj & Janja Lesar
4	28 March 2010	Matt Dusk	"Back in Town"	Group VOLT
4	28 March 2010	Matt Dusk	"Good News"	Group VOLT
5	4 April 2010	Katherine Jenkins	"Bring Me to Life"	Group VOLT
5	4 April 2010	Katherine Jenkins	"Angel"	–
6	April 25, 2010	Tomasz Szymuś's Orchestra	"Margarita"	Group VOLT
7	2 May 2010	Tomasz Szymuś's Orchestra	"We Go Together" (from Grease)	Group VOLT
7	2 May 2010	Tomasz Szymuś's Orchestra	Theme from the Fame	Rafał Maserak, Stefano Terrazzino, Łukasz Czarnecki, Jan Kliment, Blanka Winiarska, Izabela Janachowska, Paulina Biernat, Anna Głogowska
8	9 May 2010	Oceana	"Cry Cry"	–
8	9 May 2010	Bracia	"The Show Must Go On"	–
9	May 16, 2010	Tomasz Szymuś's Orchestra	"Cinema Italiano"	Group VOLT
10	May 23, 2010	Mrozu	"Miasto płonie"	Group VOLT
11	30 May 2010	Katie Melua	"Spider's Web"	–
11	30 May 2010	Katie Melua	"The Flood"	–
12	13 June 2010	Edyta Górniak	"I'm Every Woman"	Group VOLT
12	13 June 2010	Edyta Górniak	"Crazy"	–

== Rating figures ==
Episode	Date	Official rating 4+	Share 4+	Official rating 16–39	Share 16–39
1	March 7, 2010	4 577 667	27.99%	1 970 605	25.68%
2	March 14, 2010	4 670 450	28.12%	1 986 662	25.36%
3	March 21, 2010	4 633 925	28.32%	1 910 852	25.35%
4	March 28, 2010	4 480 723	26.59%	1 804 227	23.30%
5	April 4, 2010	3 848 158	25.79%	1 514 605	22.99%
6	April 25, 2010	4 041 457	25.30%	1 528 083	21.99%
7	May 2, 2010	3 710 595	26.42%	1 296 170	22.72%
8	May 9, 2010	3 981 377	25.41%	1 616 681	23.34%
9	May 16, 2010	4 363 045	27.26%	1 672 686	23.86%
10	May 23, 2010	4 021 094	26.48%	1 430 880	21.49%
11	May 30, 2010	3 777 830	24.40%	1 421 244	20.94%
12	June 13, 2010	4 575 752	30.03%	1 718 196	26.11%
Average	Season 11	4 269 697	27.03%	1 685 818	23.86%
