= Barwy szczęścia =

Polish television soap opera

- Genre: Soap opera
- Created by: Ilona Lepkowska
- Directed by: Natalia Koryncka-Gruz; Krzysztof Rogala; Jakub Skoczeń; Iwona Strzałka; Jacek Gąsiorowski
- Starring: Katarzyna Glinka; Michał Rolnicki; Marek Molak; Anna Gzyra-Augustynowicz; Adrianna Biedrzyńska; Bronisław Wrocławski; Marta Dąbrowska; Lesław Żurek; Wiktoria Gąsiewska; Rafał Cieszyński; Elżbieta Romanowska; Jakub Wieczorek; Piotr Ligienza
- Theme music composer: Maciej Zieliński
- Country of origin: Poland
- Original language: Polish
- No. of seasons: 20
- No. of episodes: 3,500

Production
- Executive producers: Tadeusz Lampka; Ilona Łepkowska
- Producer: Marcelina Początek-Kunikowska
- Cinematography: Jarosław Szmidt; Tomasz Dobrowolski
- Editor: Krzysztof Szpetmański
- Running time: 24 minutes
- Production company: Telewizja Polska

Original release
- Network: TVP2
- Release: September 27, 2007 – present

Barwy szczęścia (lit. 'Colors of Happiness') is a Polish television soap opera that was premiered on September 27, 2007 on TVP2.

== Cast ==
=== Current cast members ===
Actor/Actress	Character	Status
Katarzyna Glinka	Katarzyna Górka-Sadowska	2007–present
Sławomira Łozińska	Barbara Grzelak	2007–present
Marek Molak	Hubert Pyrka	2007–present
Natalia Zambrzycka	Agata Pyrka	2007–present
Olaf Kaprzyk	Staś Pyrka	2007–present
Marzena Trybała	Elżbieta Żeleńska	2007–present
Karolina Dafne Porcari	Anita Szymczak	2007–present
Joanna Gleń	Malwina Marczak-Kolska	2007–present
Małgorzata Potocka	Jolanta Grzelak-Kozłowska	2008–present
Bronisław Wrocławski	Jerzy Marczak	2007–present
Adrianna Biedrzyńska	Małgorzata Marczak	2007–present
Zbigniew Buczkowski	Zdzisław Cieślak	2007–present
Anna Gornostaj	Róża Cieślak	2008–present
Gabriela Ziembicka	Ewa Walawska	2008–present
Jacek Kałucki	Krzysztof Jaworski	2008–2014, 2016–present
Barbara Kurzaj	Sabina Tomala-Woźniak	2010–present
Jakub Dmochowski	Kajtek Cieślak	2010–present
Karolina Chapko	Dominika Bloch-Kowalska	2009–2011, 2019–present
Maria Dejmek	Natalia Zwoleńska (#2)	2012–present
Marcin Perchuć	Marek Złoty	2012–present
Jacek Rozenek	Artur Chowański	2012–present
Marek Krupski	Sebastian Kowalski	2012–present
Hanna Bieluszko	Krystyna Jaworska	2013–present
Witold Sosulski	Witek Elsner (#1)	2013–2018, 2020–present
Anita Jancia-Prokopowicz	Beata Saganowska-Wójcik	2013–present
Sebastian Perdek	Klemens Górecki	2014–2019, 2021–present
Michał Rolnicki	Łukasz Sadowski	2014–present
Marieta Żukowska	Bożena Stańska	2015–present
Jakub Wieczorek	Borys Grzelak	2015–present
Bożena Stachura	Urszula Karaś	2015–present
Andrzej Niemyt	Dariusz Janicki	2015–present
Wiktoria Gąsiewska	Oliwia Zbrowska	2016–present
Marek Siudym	Anatol Koszyk	2016–present
Olga Bończyk	Sylwia Paszkowska	2016–present
Lesław Żurek	Brunon Pająk-Stański	2016–present
Danuta Kowalska	Eliza Kowalska	2016–present
Elżbieta Romanowska	Aldona Grzelak	2016–present
Hubert Wiatrowski	Aleks Grzelak	2016–present
Monika Dryl	Alicja Umińska	2016–present
Milena Lisiecka	Sękowska	2016–present
Oliwier Kozłowski	Mirek Wójcik	2017–present
Julia Zielińska	Luiza Wójcik	2017–present
Hanna Klepacka	Anna "Żabcia" Żabińska	2017–present
Adam Szczyszczaj	Maciej Wilk	2017–2023, 2025–present
Grzegorz Mielczarek	Kazik Woźniak (#2)	2018–present
Konrad Skolimowski	Patryk Jezierski	2018–present
Noah Culbreht	Grześ Saganowski	2018–present
Anna Mrozowska	Renata Nowak	2018–present
Jasper Sołtysiewicz	Justin Skotnicki	2018–present
Lena Sobota	Lea Zwoleńska	2018–present
Orina Krajewska	Celina Brońska	2018–present
Bartosz Gruchot	Ksawery Rybiński Jr. (#3)	2018–present
Michał Lesień	Damian Wójcik	2018–present
Natalia Sierzputowska	Magdalena Banaś	2018–present
Marta Dąbrowska	Karolina Różańska-Stańska	2018–present
Krystyna Tkacz	Irena Wyszyńska-Koszyk	2019–present
Maciej Raniszewski	Herman Kolski	2019–present
Jakub Szlachetka	Kacper Jabłoński (#2)	2019–present
Karina Seweryn	Dorota Kujawiak	2019–present
Pola Żak	Maja Tomala (#2)	2019–present
Andrzej Popiel	Kajetan "Broda" Brodecki	2019, 2022–present
Halina Bednarz	Bogumiła Wójcik	2019, 2023–present
Jessica Frankiewicz	Emilka Brodzińska (#2)	2020–present
Marta Juras	Gabriela Niedzielska	2020–present
Maksymilian Zieliński	Zenuś Kozłowski (#3)	2020–present
Alicja Kwiatkowska	Milena Szczepkowska	2020–present
Jakub Bohosiewicz	Kornel Jezierski	2020–2021, 2023–present
Mateusz Burdach	Sergiusz	2020–2023, 2026–present
Anna Pentz	Michalina Kosma	2021–present
Dorota Kwietniewska	Olga Kosma	2021–present
Anna Maria Kosik	Sylwia	2021–present
Józef Trojanowski	Tadzio Stański	2021–present
Nina Szumowska	Marysia Pyrka (#3)	2021–present
Jakub Sokołowski	Tomasz Kępski	2021–present
Piotr Ligienza	Błażej Modrzycki	2021–present
Oskar Stoczyński	Marcin Kodur	2021–present
Martin Bogdan	Aro	2021–present
Marta Zięba	Halina Kałuża	2021, 2024–present
Kiril Denev	Omar Ravani	2021, 2024–present
Łukasz Wójcik	Radomir Branicki	2022–present
Paula Kucharska-Dziubel	Adela	2022–present
Maja Barełkowska	Wanda Kępska	2022–present
Grzegorz Kestranek	Wiktor Wiracki	2022–present
Kinga Suchan	Grażyna Wiracka	2022–present
Maria Świłpa	Weronika Cieselska	2022–present
Filip Gołąb	Norbert	2022–present
Mikołaj Trynda	Filip	2022–present
Iga Czechowicz	Alina	2022–present
Olaf Staszkiewicz	Igancy Kieliszewski	2022–present
Weronika Nockowska	Sonia Reis	2022–present
Filip Kowalewicz	Mateuszek Reis	2022–present
Adrianna Cudnik	Pola	2022–present
Aneta Spirydowicz	Majka	2022–present
Jakub Stelmaszczyk	Piotr "Suchy" Suchalski	2022–present
Rafał Fudarej	Waldemar Wyszyński	2022–present
Amelia Listwon	Ewelina Markowska	2023–present
Piotr Chys	Markowski	2023–present
Katarzyna Głogowska	Markowska	2023–present
Łukasz Borkowski	Robert Majak	2023–present
Elżbieta Jarosik	Józefina Rawicz	2023–present
Marcel Opaliński	Cezary Rawicz	2023–present
Artem Malashchuk	Emil Sokalski	2023–present
Anna Gzyra-Augustynowicz	Joanna Sokalska-Pyrka	2023–present
Mateusz Dymidziuk	Michał Rusowicz	2023–present
Rafał Cieszyński	Mariusz Karpiuk	2023–present
Dorota Piasecka	Borowska	2023–present
Joanna Pocica	Ida	2024–present
Marian Jaskulski	Czesław Zarzeczny	2024–present
Katarzyna Tlałka	Agnieszka Zarzeczna	2024–present
Nicole Bogdanowicz	Ewa Poraj	2024–present
Nina Małkiewicz	Rozalia Kolska	2024–present
Tadeusz Łaczkowski	Czarek	2024–present
Robert Gulaczyk	Szczepan Krajewski	2024–present
Monika Mikołajczak	Wiktoria Bral	2024–present
Kamila Molinari	Ciecierska	2024–present
Agnieszka Dulęba-Kasza	Matulkowska	2024–present
Agata Pruchniewska	Krystyna Szymańska	2024–present
Natalia Skrzypek	Gośka	2024–present
Leon Charewicz	Andrzej Zastoja-Modelski	2024–present
Dariusz Błażejewski	Marian Żaczyk	2025–present
Maciej Czerklański	Leszek Szymański	2025–present
Maciej Nawrocki	Bartosz	2025–present
Filip Kruszewski	Franek	2025–present
Gabriela Trawińska	Zosia	2025–present
Michalina Robakiewicz	Ola Zamilska	2025–present
Jacek Tyszkiewicz	Romeo Bianchi	2025–present
Karolina Rzepa	Jagoda Redlińska	2025–present
Daniel Antoniewicz	Matecki	2025–present
Sara Kudaj	Wioletka Złota (#2)	2025–present
Urszula Zawadzka	Iza	2025–present
Izabela Olejnik	Zofia	2025–present
Krzysztof Chudzicki	Zbigniew	2025–present
Gabriela Szewczyk	Pola	2025–present
Laura Zawadka	Iga	2025–present
Tomasz Zawód	Paweł Makowski	2025–present
Elżbieta Kijowska	Mokrzycka	2025–present
Małgorzata Neczyperowicz	Magdalena Parucka	2025–present
Oliwia Drożdżyk	Janka Dąbrowska	2025–present
Anna Bonna	Zamilska	2025–present
Sylwia Juszczak-Krawczyk	Aldona; Justyna Zytko	2010–2011; 2025–present
Małgorzata Puzio	Walczewska	2025–present
Paweł Kowalczyk	Wejher	2026–present
Radosław Osypiuk	Wiesiek	2026–present
Dominik Niktorowicz	Lerczak	2026–present
Marcin Bikowski	Daniel Sokalski	2026–present
Izabela Gwizdak	Branicka	2026–present
Dawid Dąbrowski	Jan Makowski	2026–present
Grażyna Zielińska	Lucyna Zwierzchowska	2026–present
Witold Wieliński	Bolesławski	2026–present
Małgorzata Kozłowska	Julia	2026–present
Natalia Szczypka	Daria Michalak	2026–present
Grzegorz Grabowski	Alan	2026–present
Kamil Studnicki	Adam	2026–present
Zuzanna Sygizman	Mona	2026–present
Mikołaj Florczyk	Ziemek	2026–present
Dusiek Olszański	Kamil Janas	2026–present
Daniel Namiotko	Hugon Wojciechowski	2026–present
Jakub Borowy	Oskar	2026–present
Paulina Masiak	Godecka	2026–present
Rafał Leszczyński	Godecki	2026–present
Piotr Bartha	Kris Hausman	2026–present
Sławomir Głazek	Roman	2026–present
Gamou Fall	Michał Kwiatkowski	2026–present

=== Former cast members ===
Actor/Actress	Character	Status
Olga Jankowska	Klara Pyrka	2007–2023
Izabela Zwierzyńska	Iwona Pyrka	2007–2022
† Jolanta Lothe	† Teresa Struzik	2007–2017, 2019–2021
† Krzysztof Kiersznowski	† Stefan Górka	2007–2021
† Paweł Nowisz	† Fryderyk Struzik (#2)	2010–2017, 2019–2021
† Jan Pęczek	† Zenon Grzelak	2007–2021
Piotr Jankowski	† Piotr Walawski	2007–2020
Joanna Moro	Zosia Karnicka-Walawska	2007–2015, 2017–2019
Kazimierz Wysota	Bogdan Zwoleński	2007–2018
Dorota Kolak	Anna Marczak	2007–2018
Jakub Małek	Wojtek Pyrka	2007–2018
Honorata Witańska	Magda Zwoleńska	2007–2018
Katarzyna Zielińska	† Marta Walawska	2007–2017
Izabela Kuna	† Maria Pyrka-Złota	2007–2016
Olaf Lubaszenko	† Roman Pyrka	2007–2011
Marta Nieradkiewicz	Julia Marczak-Zwoleńska	2007–2012, 2014
Marcin Hycnar	Paweł Zwoleński	2007–2012, 2014–2015
Anna Piróg	Dorota Jeleń	2007–2014
Daniel Cygler	Franek Jeleń	2007–2014
† Krzysztof Respondek	Michał Jeleń	2007–2015
Małgorzata Buczkowska	Blanka Filipska	2008–2012
Edward Lubaszenko	† Ryszard Pyrka	2008
Teresa Dzielska	† Ewelina Jakubowska; Kaja Jakubowska	2007–2008; 2008–2012
Michał Kruk	Mateusz	2007–2008
Samuel Palmer	† Sam Smith	2008–2009
Małgorzata Lipmann	Mary Smith	2008–2009
Malwina Buss	Natalia Zwoleńska (#1)	2007–2012
Agnieszka Pilaszewska	† Jadwiga Górka	2007–2010
† Jan Hencz	† Fryderyk Struzik (#1)	2007–2010
Kalina Hlimi-Pawlukiewicz	Weronika Puszczyk	2008–2011, 2014–2015
Patrycja Soliman	Karolina Tarnowska	2010–2011
Wojciech Brzeziński	Feliks Tarnowski	2011
Agnieszka Mandat	Helena	2008–2011
Aleksandra Nieśpielak	Anna	2007–2010
Anna Prus	Sylwia	2007–2008
Magdalena Boczarska	Patrycja	2007–2008
Julia Kamińska	Majka	2008
Tomasz Raczek	Barczak	2008–2011
Joanna Trzepiecińska	Renata	2008–2011
Dorota Segda	† Danuta Śliwińska	2008–2012
Jarosław Boberek	Radosław Golonko	2011–2012
Agnieszka Żulewska	Sylwia Krajewska	2011
Łukasz Garlicki	Cezary Janicki	2010
Zofia Kucówna	Nadia Orłowska	2011
Małgorzata Niemirska	Beata Sacewicz	2011
Ewa Hornich	Laura	2010–2011
Tomasz Sobczak	† Olgierd Śliwiński	2009–2010, 2013–2014, 2017
Piotr Dąbrowski	Mikołaj Walawski	2007–2010
† Joanna Bogacka	† Grażyna Walawska	2007–2010
Grzegorz Grabowski	Marek Walawski	2007–2009
Barbara Lauks	Krystyna Puszczyk	2008
Elżbieta Kijowska	Irena Jeleń	2008
Sebastian Cybulski	† Ksawery Rybiński	2007–2013
Paweł Prokopczuk	Jarosław Jabłoński	2007–2010, 2012–2014
Adam Cywka	Kostek Jeleń	2008–2015
Elena Leszczyńska	Ludmiła Jeleń	2010–2015
Agnieszka Wosińska	Edyta Jeleń	2010–2015
Krzysztof Szczerbiński	Witek	2007–2008, 2010
Małgorzata Sadowska	Marianna	2008, 2010
Zbigniew Konopka	Grzegorz Miguła	2009–2011
Kamil Cetnarowicz	Kamil	2008–2010
Henryk Nolewajka	Henryk Filipski	2009–2011
Karol Celiński	Zenuś Kozłowski (#1)	2010–2011
Agnieszka Kawiorska	Kinga Zawadzka	2010–2013
Grzegorz Goch	Gabriel	2011–2012
Andrzej Konopka	Ryszard Mikiciuk	2011–2012
Agnieszka Wagner	Izabela Gordon	2008–2012
Jacek Mikołajczak	Rafał Gordon	2008–2012
Anna Sandowicz	Maja Dąbrowska	2008–2012
Krystian Barej	Szymek Gordon	2010–2012
Anna Radwan-Gancarczyk	Gabriela Gordon	2009–2010
Marta Chodorowska	Klaudia Nowakowska	2009–2012
Paweł Deląg	Łukasz Halicki	2009–2011
Dorota Chotecka	Celina Halicka	2009–2011
Dorota Bierkowska	Hanna Jakubowska	2008–2012
Sławomir Orzechowski	Andrzej Jakubowski	2008–2012
Halina Łabonarska	Zofia Filipska	2009–2012
Mariusz Wojciechowski	Eryk Najman	2010–2012
Piotr Domalewski	Szymon	2010–2012
Hubert Jarczak	Tymon	2010–2012
Piotr Głowacki	Kazik Woźniak (#1)	2010–2012
Antonina Choroszy	Ilona	2010–2013
Maria Mamona	Bożena Nowakowska	2009–2013
Eryk Kulm	Kuba	2010–2013
Agnieszka Fórmanowska	Oliwia Halicka	2009–2011
Piotr Grabowski (born 1968)	Borys Sacewicz	2010–2012
Dariusz Kwaśnik	Majewski	2011–2013
Sergiusz Olejnik	Jacek Sobisiak	2011–2012
Justyna Bojczuk	Żaneta Mikiciuk	2011–2012
Beata Kawka	Janina Mikiciuk	2011–2012
Franciszek Serwa	Gniewosz Dudka	2011–2013
Piotr Nowak	Mietek	2011–2012
Cezary Morawski	Bogumił Karaś	2012–2013
Michał Milowicz	Cezary Bąk	2012
Leszek Teleszyński	Konrad Mazurski	2012
Mariusz Zaniewski	Damian Niedzielski	2012
Krzysztof Pluskota	Darek	2012
Karolina Muszalak	Eliza	2012
Michał Bogdanowicz	Asim	2012
Conrado Moreno	Manuel	2012
Eric Folly	Bob	2012
Ilona Kucińska	Mirosława Korycka	2010–2014
Krzysztof Bochenek	Selim Korycki	2010–2014
Konrad Jałowiec	Rick	2012–2014
Łukasz Nowicki	Sławomir Wolski	2012–2014
Oliwier Wieciński	Ksawery Rybiński Jr. (#1)	2013–2014
Maurycy Wysocki	Kacper Jabłoński (#1)	2007–2015
Anna Borowiec	† Halina Marczak	2007–2015
† Hanna Stankówna	† Mariola Barczyk	2007–2015
† Emil Karewicz	† Tadeusz Barczyk	2007–2015
Marcin Czarnik	Robert Romanowski	2008–2015
Barbara Sołtysik	Wanda Jarzębska	2008–2015
Mateusz Ławrynowicz	Norbert Kwiatkowski	2008–2015
Edmund Karwański	Remigiusz Jarzębski	2009–2015
Olena Leonenko	Oksana Górka	2010–2015
Piotr Żukowski	Sasza Sokołowski	2010–2015
Dobromir Dymecki	Przemek Brodziński	2010–2015
Marta Dobecka	Patrycja Tomaszewska	2011–2015
Michalina Olszańska	Tina	2012–2015
Dawid Kartaszewicz	Daniel Rosiak	2012–2015
Emilia Krakowska	Antonina	2012–2015
Ewa Skibińska	Urszula Korzeniak	2012–2015
Piotr Gawron-Jedlikowski	Kamil Krawczyk	2012–2015
Dominika Kimaty	Sara Brown-Jakubik	2011–2015
Paweł Domagała	Arek	2013–2015
Dorota Kamińska	Ewelina Krawczyk	2013–2015
Leon Gajos	Miłosz Walawski (#1)	2013–2015
Tymoteusz Litwiniak	Kazik	2014–2015
Paweł Ciółkosz	Szymon Kaleta	2014–2015
Katarzyna Dorosińska	Nadia Wojciechowska	2014–2015
Tadeusz Chudecki	Gabriel Nowak	2014–2015
Jakub Konieczny	Jędrek	2014–2015
Dorota Naruszewicz	Elwira Chowańska	2014–2015
Krzysztof Franieczek	Kukliński	2015
Marcin Sztabiński	Kris Baranowski	2015
Antonina Respondek	Ada	2008–2013, 2014–2016
Tomasz Mycan	Maciej Kołodziejski	2009–2016
† Hanna Dunowska	Alina Rybińska	2009–2016
Jacek Romanowski	Waldemar Rybiński	2009–2016
Andrzej Łątkowski	Pako	2010–2016
Aldona Orman	Konstancja Dudzińska	2011–2014, 2016
Bartosz Waga	Dawid Wierzbicki	2011–2014, 2016
Bartosz Gelner	Bartek Koszyk	2012–2016
Dominika Figurska	Karolina Florczak	2013–2016
Aleksandra Justa	Matylda Pawłowicz	2014–2016
Michał Kitliński	Czarek Nowacki	2014–2016
Wojciech Dąbrowski	Roman Janiszewski	2015–2016
Anna Dereszowska	Agnieszka Walczak	2015–2016
Magdalena Kuta	Judyta Walczak	2015–2016
Vadim Afanassiev	Wadim Aleksandrowicz	2015–2016
Paval Kryksunou	Władimir Kuzniecow	2015–2016
Aleksandra Woźniak	Dominika Sadowska	2015–2016
Paweł Iwanicki	Józef Kasprzak	2015–2016
Malwina Turek	Lara	2015–2016
Dawid Zawadzki	Wojciech Florczak	2015–2016
Kamil Maćkowiak	Marcel Lasota	2015–2016
Sylwia Madejska	Roma	2015–2016
Paweł Ferenc	Mirek Kubiak	2015–2016
Mariusz Ostrowski	Jacek Brożek	2015–2016
Katarzyna Herman	Kornelia Wagner	2015–2016
Artur Chamski	Jakub	2015–2016
Kalina Kajper	† Monika Walawska (#1)	2015–2016
Włodzimierz Matuszak	Leon Małkowski	2015–2016
Agnieszka Homańska	Ela Małkowska	2015–2016
Edyta Herbuś	Stanisława Cieplak	2016
Aleksandra Radwan	Żaneta	2016
Otar Saralidze	Irek Redyk	2010–2017
Krzysztof Kozłowicz	Krzysztof Redyk	2012–2015, 2017
Aleksandra Szwed	† Liliana Górecka	2013–2017
Sambor Czarnota	Adrian Świderski	2013–2017
Maria Dębska	Jaga	2014–2017
Paulina Komenda	Sandra Grzybowska	2015–2017
Aneta Todorczuk-Perchuć	Danuta Szostak	2015–2017
Monika Kwiatkowska	Zofia Wichrowska	2016–2017
Przemysław Cypryański	Jacek Madejski	2016–2017
Cezary Żak	Roman Berg	2016–2017
Amin Bensalem	Fayad Maris	2016–2017
Andrzej Niemirski	Wiesław "Modest" Solicha	2016–2017
Joanna Kurowska	Franceska Leoni	2017
Przemysław Bluszcz	† Wiktor Nawrot	2017
Jerzy Dudek	himself	2017
Grzegorz Wons	Wojciechowski	2017
Radosław Krzyżowski	Bernand Urbański	2017
† Andrzej Strzelecki	Czarnoleski	2017
Zofia Schwinke	Kinga Brzeska	2017
Tadeusz Borowski	† Karol Żeleński	2007–2012, 2014–2015, 2018
Krzysztof Wach	Alek Korycki	2010–2018
Jakub Tolak	Zbyszko Dobroń	2013–2018
Grzegorz Małecki	Mikołaj Dąbrowski	2013–2015, 2017–2018
Ewa Konstancja Bułhak	Grażyna Wasilewska	2014–2018
Bastian Węglewski	Ksawery Rybiński Jr. (#2)	2014–2018
Mikołaj Krawczyk	Oliwier Jakubczyk	2015–2018
Sebastian Skoczeń	Zbigniew Turkowski	2015–2018
Ewa Florczak	Marianna Tomala	2015–2018
Arkadiusz Janiczek	Szczepan Zbrowski	2016–2018
Helena Englert	Angela Kowalska	2016–2018
Sylwia Wysocka	Grzybowska	2016, 2018
Józef Grzymała	Robert Milewicz	2017–2018
Marianna Kowalewska	Kamila Skowrońska	2017–2018
Mirosław Baka	Jakub Nasielski	2017–2018
Jessica Sara Witenko	Weronika Wilk	2017–2018
Paulina Janczak	Kama	2017–2018
Ania Karwan	Ula Skowrońska	2017–2018
Tomasz Borkowski	Cezary Plaskota	2018
Jakub Przebindowski	Barański	2018
Weronika Lewoń	Marta Krzepińska	2018
Dariusz Kordek	Karol Badeński	2018
Anna Wojton	† Ruta Saganowska	2018
Mariusz Drężek	Adam Czapla	2018
Modest Ruciński	Kowaluk	2018
Tomasz Dedek	Matuszewski	2018
Przemysław Redkowski	Jan Kozłowski	2009–2019
Henryk Gołębiewski	Leszek	2010–2011, 2014, 2018
Lena Parol	Maja Tomala (#1)	2015–2019
Maciej Czachowski	Oskar Kołecki	2016–2019
Damian Haberny	Cyprian	2016, 2018–2019
Jakub Kwinta	Miłosz Walawski (#2)	2015–2016, 2018–2019
Monika Żyłowska	† Monika Walawska (#2)	2016, 2018–2019
Marek Kossakowski	Rafał Krzepiński	2017–2019
Joanna Śnieżyńska	Marysia Pyrka (#1)	2017–2019
Zacharjasz Muszyńśki	Jewgienij	2017–2019
Jakub Mróz	Tadeusz Nawrot	2017–2019
Jolanta Olszewska	Aniela Gwizdoń	2017–2019
† Stanisław Brudny	† Jan Szuman	2017, 2019
Ewa Kuryło	Maryla	2018–2019
Maria Ruddick	Mia Jabłońska	2018–2019
Natan Gudejko	Igor	2018–2019
Marcin Błaszak	Dobrzyński	2018–2019
Anna Stela	Marzena Kubiak	2018–2019
Aleksander Dunrowski	Antek	2018–2019
Krzysztof Antkowiak	Piotr Wolan	2018–2019
Krzysztof Kluzik	Henryk Kostruba	2019
Elżbieta Nagel	Ewelina Sałatka	2019
Maciej Zuchowicz	Kamil Gliwa	2019
Leon Natan-Pasek	Witek Elsner (#2)	2019
Katarzyna Kołeczek	Ela	2019
Adam Kamień	Norbert	2019
Mikołaj Drożdż	Anzelm Makowski	2019
Magdalena Pociecha	Tomczykowa	2019
Paweł Peterman	Tomczyk	2019
Kacper Dyka	Makary Tomczyk	2019
Wojciech Skibiński	Alojzy Bednarek	2019
Hanna Konarowska	Albina Węgrzyk	2019
Paweł Koślik	Maurycy Szkatułka	2019
Jacek Pluta	Witold Sarnecki	2019
Robert Czebotar	Zbigniew Szeląg	2008–2011, 2012–2014, 2017–2020
Beniamin Ziontek	Zenuś Kozłowski (#2)	2011–2015, 2018–2020
Katarzyna Zielińska-Jaworska	Diana Harnaś	2012–2015, 2019–2020
Magdalena Grąziowska	Marlena Czerwińska	2012–2017, 2020
Aleksandra Popławska	Nina Elsner	2013–2017, 2020
Bartłomiej Nowosielski	Andrzej Tomala	2013–2018, 2020
Krystian Kukułka	Ernest Chowański	2014–2020
Katarzyna Sawczuk	Julita Sałatka	2015–2020
Patryk Cebulski	Eryk Skalski	2016–2020
Mateusz Rzeźniczak	Paweł Piasecki	2016–2020
Anna Grycewicz	Klaudia Zbrowska	2016–2017, 2019–2020
Andrzej Bienias	Janusz Sałatka	2017–2020
Andrzej Glazer	Ignacy Firlej	2017–2018, 2020
Jakub Dyniewski	Filip Lisicki	2018–2020
Daniel Szczypa	Lisicki	2018–2020
Divine Kitenge-Martyńska	Carina Kandal	2018–2020
Tomasz Błasiak	Tomasz Górski	2018–2020
Maciej Marczewski	Szymon Jabłoński	2018–2020
Adam Młynarczyk	Zieliński	2018–2020
Kajetan Wolniewicz	Abaj	2019–2020
Maksymilian Rogacki	Artur Durski	2019–2020
Ewelina Bator	Emilia	2019–2020
Paweł Draszba	Mariusz "Szakal" Wolski	2019–2020
Anna Janik	Sygita	2019–2020
Przemysław Furdak	Jacek	2019–2020
Marcin Kwaśny	Maciek; Adam Jabłońśki	2007–2008; 2019–2020
Agnieszka Przepiórska	Wanda Jabłońska	2019–2020
Wojciech Billip	Tobiasz	2019–2020
Olga Barej	Ewelina Pabiś-Białkowska	2019–2020
Maria Winiarska	Wiesława Węgorz	2019–2020
Antonina Niewiarowska	Marysia Pyrka (#2)	2019–2020
Marcin Stec	Maksymilian Szubert	2019–2020
Konrad Kapica	Dominik	2020
Maciej Luśnia	Kwapisz	2020
Karina Rezner	Wiktoria	2020
Gabriela Chojnacka	Patrycja	2020
Jakub Zdrójkowski	Bogdan	2020
Patryk Kabala	Krzysiek	2020
Kacper Godek	Piotrek	2020
Łukasz Szczepanik	Mietek Kusio	2020
Leonardo Marques	Alvaro Dorata	2020
Jacek Lenartowicz	Bronisław Kwiatkowski	2020
Magdalena Woźniak	Kwiatkowska	2020
Hubert Sycz	Emil Kwiatkowski	2020
Maja Bohosiewicz	Agnieszka "Agnes" Sokołowska	2020
Mariusz Połeć	Teo	2020
Vu Le Hong	Hong	2020
Julia Szamałek	Martyna Romanowska	2020
Ada Fijał	Iga Walawska	2008–2021
Ireneusz Kozioł	Stanisław Król	2008–2009, 2011, 2013–2014, 2018, 2020–2021
Przemysław Stippa	Władysław Cieślak	2009–2021
Julian Wiszniewski Oribhabor	John Jakubik (#1)	2011–2015, 2018–2021
Joanna Król	Wioletta Kurzajczyk	2013–2015, 2020–2021
Marzena Rogalska	Edyta Szatkowska	2013–2021
Marek Lewandowski	Ludwik Sadowski	2015–2016, 2019–2021
Ewa Serwa	Regina Sadowska-Niziołek	2015–2016, 2019–2021
Jakub Wróblewski	Tymon	2016–2021
Zofia Zborowska	† Aneta Dylska	2017–2021
Marcin Sosnowski	Mieczysław Dolecki	2018–2021
Michał Witkowski	Waldemar Kniewski	2018–2021
Marcel Borowiec	Winicjusz Ziemiński	2018–2021
Eryk Martyński	Stefanek Falkowski	2018–2021
Katarzyna Sowińska	Greta Domecka	2019–2021
Janusz Cichocki	Helmut Niziołek	2019–2021
Joanna Opozda	Sandra	2019–2021
Sandra Herbich	Miriam Piasecka	2019–2021
Piotr Sędkowski	Remigiusz Białkowski	2019–2021
Grażyna Brodzińska	Arleta Banach	2019–2021
Magdalena Durzyńska	Mirka	2019–2021
Ewa Mosakowska	Mika	2020–2021
Dariusz Majchrzak	Adam Chojnacki	2020–2021
Bartosz Włodarczyk	Jonasz Sałatka	2019–2021
Kacper Młynarkiewicz	Mikołaj	2020–2021
Aniceta Raczek-Ochinicka	Halszka	2020–2021
Ewa Złotowska	Łucja	2020–2021
Renata Berger	Ola	2020–2021
Roch Semianowski	Jacek Ludwiczak	2020–2021
Wiktor Loga	Karol Opak	2020–2021
Bartosz Mikulak	Irokez	2020–2021
Andrzej Skorupa	Dobek	2021
Michał Hołub	Jacek Wieczorek	2021
Ziemowit Wasielewski	Piotr Łąka	2021
Izabela Zachowicz	Ida Koszyk	2021
Anna Kózka	Patrycja Kruk	2021
Maciej Kaczyński	Wiktor Kruk	2021
Bogusław Kudłek	Jacek Kmita	2021
Joanna Gonschorek	Kuczmowa	2021
Bartłomiej Krat	Biernacki	2021
Michał Siudek	Marcin Milewski	2021
Jarosław Drobot	Mazur	2021
Lidia Sadowa	Justyna Kwiatkowska	2007–2016, 2022
Bartosz Porczyk	Adam Jakubik	2007–2010, 2012, 2015, 2022
Anna Adamus	Zuzia Woźniak	2010–2022
† Kazimierz Mazur	† Tomasz Wiśniewski	2014–2022
Filip Kosior	Radek Morawski	2015–2022
Patryk Pniewski	Józef Sałatka	2017–2022
Sebastian Stankiewicz	Ryszard Gawron	2017–2022
Kim Grygierzec	Laura Kamińska	2018–2019, 2021–2022
Rafał Szałajko	Leon	2018–2019, 2021–2022
Stanisław Górka	Witold Burkiewicz	2018–2019, 2022
Julia Staniszewska	Julia Sałatka	2019–2022
Rafał Maślak	Alan	2019–2022
Emil Lipski	Adrian	2019–2022
Jan Wieteska	Dawid	2019–2022
Bartosz Adamczyk	Igor Sobański	2020–2022
Andrzej Michalski	† Prot Laskowski	2020–2022
Maciej Jachowski	Andrzej Romanowski	2020–2022
Aurelia Żarnowiecka	Wioletka Złota (#1)	2020–2022
Dariusz Bronowicki	Igor Wyrwas	2021–2022
Sławomir Holland	Vivia Puławy CEO	2021–2022
Kinga Bobkowska	Zosia	2021–2022
Marcin Dąbrowski	Meduz	2021–2022
Małgorzata Krzysica	Irena Adler-Śliwińska	2021–2022
Dawid Okafor	John Jakubik (#2)	2021–2022
Jarosław Paczyński	Adamski	2022
Zbigniew Waleryś	Bogusław Wacławik	2022
Łukasz Choroń	Staszek	2022
Barbara Tabita	Rosa	2022
Federica Guglielmino	Silvia Lombardo	2022
Dagmara Bryzek	Gosia	2022
Kamila Janik	Ada	2022
Władysław Grzywna	Rybik	2022
Marcin Lipski	Miron	2022
Kamil Przystał	Wolski	2022
Tomasz Nosiński	Igor Duszyński	2022
Mikołaj Wachowski	Maks Duszyński	2022
Igor Kujawski	Grabski	2022
Mayu Gralińska Sakai	Lilly Wang	2022
Piotr Borowski	Antonio Casalli; Zbigniew Stawicki	2009–2010; 2019–2021, 2023
Emilia Warabida	Lidia Morawska	2012–2023
Agnieszka Mrozińska	Mariola Kłos	2017–2023
Magdalena Żak	Jowita Jezierska	2018–2023
Agnieszka Warchulska	Izabela Małek	2019–2023
Lena Jastrzębska	Paulina Małek	2019–2023
Marek Kałużyński	Tytus Wangel	2019–2023
Filip Wałcerz	Waldemar Ryman	2021–2023
Piotr Duda	Wilecki	2021–2023
Adam Stępnicki	Biniu	2022–2023
Natalia Jędruś	nurse Kama Zdrojewska	2022–2023
Maciej Mikołajczyk	Piotr Jarecki	2022–2023
Artur Bocheński	Bartosz	2022–2023
Mieszko Syc	Donek	2022–2023
Filip Kempiński	Krysiak	2022–2023
Agata Puterko	Roma	2022–2023
Antoni Paradowski	Konrad Głowski	2022–2023
Paweł Okraska	Koralow	2023
Saverio Fabbri	Paul Cane	2023
Wiktor Korzeniowski	Gryzalski	2023
Andriej Selivonets	Zbyszek	2023
Joanna Reda	Gloria	2023
Artur Ziółkowski	Kiciak	2023
Piotr Cyrwus	Jankowski	2023
Lech Dyblik	Wiesław Konarzewski	2023
Michele Innocente	Alessandro Bernardino	2023
Paweł Peterman	Jack Skupski	2023
Marta Sutor	Karina	2023
Katarzyna Czapla	nurse Monika Lasek	2023
Wiktoria Karbownik	Marika	2023
Adam Rosa	Albert Gwizdoń	2023
Sylwia Sokołowska	Krymska	2023
Ewa Ziętek	Waleria Górka	2012–2021, 2024
Arkadiusz Nader	Józef Kuczma	2019–2024
Wojciech Solarz	Rafał Zaborski	2019, 2021–2024
Ewelina Serafin	Sławomira Jezierska	2020–2024
Alessandro Curti	Vincenzo Ilardi	2021–2024
Weronika Hoepfner	Hania	2021–2024
Jonatan Borowski	Robert Kałuża	2021, 2024
Paweł Pietrzak	Kuba	2022–2024
Maciej Miąsek	Piter	2022–2024
Maciej Maciejewski	Przyłupski	2023–2024
Magdalena Różańska	Przyłupska	2023–2024
Beata Fido	Wanda Halicka	2023–2024
Jadwiga Wianecka	Mariola Gabała	2023–2024
Vincent Przybylski	Karol Majewski	2023–2024
Grzegorz Sierzputowski	Jan Dwoicki	2024
Angela Ottone	Guliana	2024
Monika Mariotti	Bianca	2024
Mateusz Sacharzewski	Konrad Karwacki	2024
Monika Janik-Hussakowska	Karwacka	2024
Ludwik Borkowski	Adamski	2024
Grzegorz Kowalczyk	Nowak	2024
Aleksander Szeląg	Jacek	2024
Kacper Krasowski	Julek	2024
Diana Kadłubowska	Skłodowska	2024
Jagoda Nowosielska	Nikola	2024
Izabella Bukowska	Cichecka	2024
Maciej Kosmala	† Hieronim Bonda	2020–2021, 2023–2025
Władysław Domański	Kamilek Falkowski	2021–2025
Zbigniew Suszyński	Tadeusz Adamski † Henryk Kępski	2015; 2022–2025
Lera Guliaieva	Sofia Bojko	2023–2025
Jacek Grondowy	† Kazimierz Szymański	2024–2025
Jan Aleksandrowicz	Żyłka	2024–2025
Paweł Ławrynowicz	Tomasz Bogusz † Robert Stefaniak	2011–2014; 2024–2025
Mateusz Łasowski	Barański	2025
Katarzyna Cynke	Brygida	2025
Marcin Borchardt	Stocel	2025
Małgorzata Górzna	Elwira	2025
Ilenia Tumino	Emma	2025
Piotr Makarski	Trojan	2025
Cezary Nowak	Antoni Kiryłło	2025
Jan Pyrek	John	2025
Paweł Izdebski	Jakub Zieliński	2025
Andrzej Szeremeta	Bazylow	2025
† Stanisława Celińska	† Amelia Wiśniewska	2014–2026
Kamila Kamińska	Regina Falkowska	2018–2026
Mateusz Banasiuk	Franek Falkowski	2018–2026
Jan Wieczorkowski	† Karol Czubak	2024–2026
Zbigniew Stryj	Władysław Grad	2025–2026
Piotr Kaźmierczak	† Ryszard Dąbrowski	2026
Wenanty Nosul	† Bogumił Krapik	2026

== Series overview ==
Season	Year	Episode	First aired	Last aired
1	2007/2008	1–128	27 September 2007	19 June 2008
2	2008/2009	129–293	1 September 2008	18 June 2009
3	2009/2010	294–448	31 August 2009	10 June 2010
4	2010/2011	449–610	6 September 2010	16 June 2011
5	2011/2012	611–770	5 September 2011	7 June 2012
6	2012/2013	771–955	3 September 2012	31 May 2013
7	2013/2014	956–1149	2 September 2013	13 June 2014
8	2014/2015	1150–1307	1 September 2014	11 June 2015
9	2015/2016	1308–1475	31 August 2015	9 June 2016
10	2016/2017	1476–1679	22 August 2016	9 June 2017
11	2017/2018	1680–1884	21 August 2017	15 June 2018
12	2018/2019	1885–2082	27 August 2018	7 June 2019
13	2019/2020	2083–2274	2 September 2019	5 June 2020
14	2020/2021	2275–2465	1 September 2020	11 June 2021
15	2021/2022	2466–2648	6 September 2021	3 June 2022
16	2022/2023	2649–2825	5 September 2022	26 May 2023
17	2023/2024	2826–3019	28 August 2023	7 June 2024
18	2024/2025	3020–3202	2 September 2024	30 May 2025
19	2025/2026	3203–3391	1 September 2025	29 May 2026
20	2026/2027	3392–	7 September 2026	28 May 2027
