= Reguły gry =

Polish television sitcom

- Based on: Rules of Engagement by Tom Hertz
- Directed by: Bartłomiej Ignaciuk
- Starring: Julia Kamińska; Maciej Zakościelny; Katarzyna Kwiatkowska; Jan Jankowski; Paweł Wilczak
- Country of origin: Poland
- No. of seasons: 1
- No. of episodes: 15

Production
- Producers: Rafał Orlik; Wojciech Bockenheim
- Camera setup: Multi-camera
- Running time: 21 minutes
- Production companies: TVN 7 CBS Studios International; Sony Pictures Television

Original release
- Network: TVN 7
- Release: February 16 – May 31, 2012

Related
- Rules of Engagement

Reguły Gry (Rules of the Game) is a Polish television sitcom directed by Bartłomiej Ignaciuk that premiered on TVN 7 on 16 February 2012. Filming of the show began on 4 December 2011. It is based on the American sitcom Rules of Engagement.

In April 2012, Reguły Gry was renewed for a second series. Filming was to begin in June and broadcast was set to start in September 2012. However, in June 2012 production of the second series was halted due to advertisement market crisis.

== Plot ==
The series follows the story of five friends: a newly engaged couple - Natasza and Adam (Julia Kamińska and Maciej Zakościelny), a long-married couple - Magda and Grzegorz (Katarzyna Kwiatkowska and Jan Jankowski) and their still-single friend - Jacek (Paweł Wilczak).

== Cast ==
- Julia Kamińska as Natasza
- Maciej Zakościelny as Adam
- Katarzyna Kwiatkowska as Magda
- Jan Jankowski as Grzegorz
- Paweł Wilczak as Jacek

== Episodes ==
No.	Title	Directed by	Written by	Original release date	Poland viewers (millions)
1	"Koniec wolności" "End of Freedom"	Bartłomiej Ignaciuk	Olga Dowgird	16 February 2012	0.369
2	"Żar młodości" "The Fervour of Youthfulness"	Bartłomiej Ignaciuk	Katarzyna Krzysztopik	23 February 2012	335,511
3	"Gry i zabawy" "Games and Plays"	Bartłomiej Ignaciuk	Kuba Wecsile	1 March 2012	0.265
4	"Męska interwencja" "Men's Intervention"	Bartłomiej Ignaciuk	Beata Pasek	8 March 2012	N/A
5	"Urodzinowy numerek" "The Birthday Deal"	Bartłomiej Ignaciuk	Katarzyna Krzysztopik	15 March 2012	N/A
6	"Kołderka wspomnień" "The Quilt of Reminiscences"	Bartłomiej Ignaciuk	Doman Nowakowski	22 March 2012	N/A
7	"Siostra żony" "Wife's Sister"	Bartłomiej Ignaciuk	Kuba Wecsile	29 March 2012	N/A
8	"Flirtująca z ogniem" "Flirting with the Fire"	Bartłomiej Ignaciuk	Katarzyna Krzysztopik	5 April 2012	N/A
9	"Homo erectus" "Homo Erectus"	Bartłomiej Ignaciuk	Olga Dowgird	12 April 2012	N/A
10	"Męskie zasady" "Male Rules"	Bartłomiej Ignaciuk	Unknown	19 April 2012	N/A
11	"Stary dobry grzech" "Old Good Sin"	Bartłomiej Ignaciuk	Unknown	26 April 2012	N/A
12	"Impreza zaręczynowa" "Engagement Party"	Bartłomiej Ignaciuk	Unknown	10 May 2012	N/A
13	"Winda do nieba"	Unknown	Unknown	17 May 2012	N/A
14	"Poznaj moją mamę"	Unknown	Unknown	24 May 2012	N/A
15	"Fucha Nataszy"	Unknown	Unknown	31 May 2012	N/A

== Ratings ==
Reguły Gry premiered on TVN 7 on 16 February 2012 at 8:00 p.m. and attracted the audience of 371,978 viewers.

Episodes	Timeslot	Series premiere	Series finale	Viewers	Share (4+)	Share (16–49)
15	Thursday 8:00 p.m.	16 February 2012	31 May 2012	227 000	1,54%	2,40%
