= Julia Kamińska =

Polish film and television actress (born 1987)

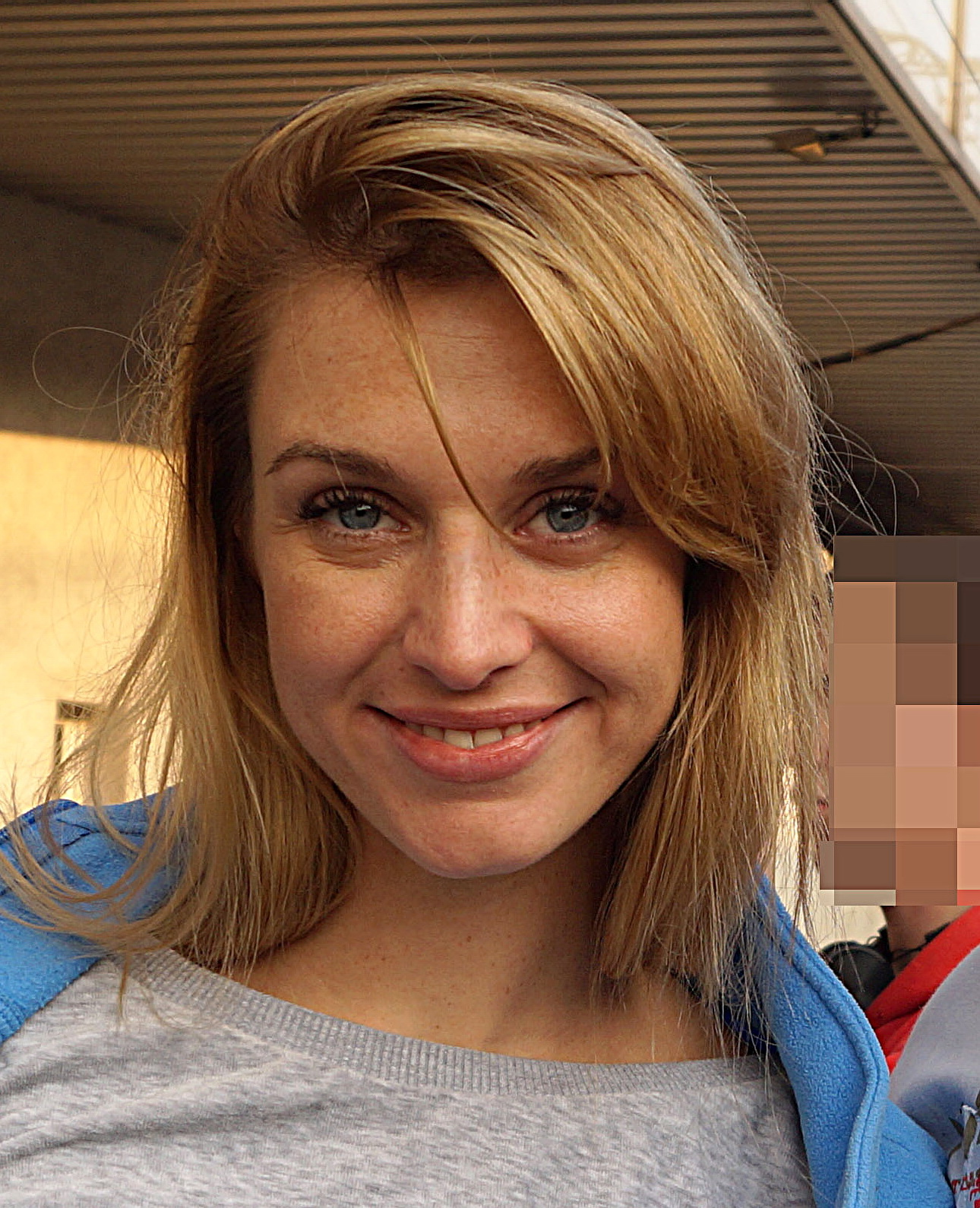
- Kamińska in 2017
- Born: Julia Małgorzata Kamińska; 13 November 1987 (age 38); Gdańsk, Poland
- Occupation: Actress

Julia Kamińska (born 13 November 1987) is a Polish film and television actress. Kamińska had a lead role in TVN's BrzydUla, the Polish version of Betty la fea, and was in Reguły Gry (Rules of the Game).

In 2022, she was announced as a judge for the Polish version of the music game show, The Masked Singer.

== Early life ==
Kamińska was born in Gdańsk to a family of Polish Catholics. Her father, Krzysztof Kamiński, is a naval engineer and teacher at a university in Trójmiasto. Her mother, Małgorzata Kamińska, is a hydrotechnics engineer.

Kamińska began acting in middle school when she joined Wybrzeżak an education-oriented theater group. As part of this project Kamińska took the lead role in Romeo and Juliet alongside actors Szymon Jachimek and Wojciech Tremiszewski. In 2003, she played the role of Gloria in a Wybrzezak/University of Northern Iowa co-production of Dead Poets Society.

During her high school years Kamińska also worked as photo model and in 2005 she appeared on the cover of a teen magazine. She also studied German linguistics. In 2006 Kamińska enrolled in the University of Gdańsk's School of Modern Languages.

== Career ==
In 2005, Kamińska appeared with her brother Christian Kamiński in the TV show Pełną Parą. Later that year, she became a co-host for a local morning children's show called Królestwo Maciusia.

In 2006, Kamińska joined the cast of the TV show Ja wam pokażę! playing the character of Tosia.

In 2008, Kamińska was cast as the character "Ula" in the TVN show BrzydUla, a Polish remake of the internationally acclaimed Betty la fea. Following the original storyline, Ula falls in love with her boss Marek Dobrzański, played by Filip Bobek. She won Telekamery award.

From 2012 Kamińska has been playing a leading role in the sitcom Reguły Gry (Rules of the Game) based on the US hit Rules of Engagement.

== Taniec z Gwiazdami ==
Kamińska won the 11th season of Polish Dancing with the Stars - Taniec z Gwiazdami.

Week #	Dance/Song	Judges' score				Result
Week #	Dance/Song	Pavlović	Wodecki	Tyszkiewicz	Galiński	Result
1	Waltz / "When I Need You"	6	8	9	6	No elimination
2	Rumba / "I Want to Know What Love Is"	6	9	9	7	Safe
3	Tango / "Toxic"	8	10	9	10	Safe
4	Paso Doble / "El Conquistador"	10	10	10	10	Safe
5	Viennese Waltz / "Crying"	10	10	10	10	Safe
6	Salsa / "Mambo Gozon"	9	10	10	10	Safe
7	Jive / "Footloose"	10	10	10	10	Safe
8	Cha-Cha-Cha / "I Want to Break Free"	8	9	9	8	Safe
9	Foxtrot / "Singin' in the Rain"; Rumba / "I Have a Dream"	9; 9	9; 10	9; 10	9; 10	Safe
10	Samba / "Brazil"; Waltz / "Memory"	10; 10	10; 10	10; 10	10; 10	Safe
11; Semi-finals	Salsa / "Tres Gotas De Agua Bendita"; Quickstep / "You're the One That I Want"	9; 10	10; 10	10; 10	10; 10	Bottom two
12; Finals	Paso Doble / "El Conquistador"; Waltz / "Memory"; Freestyle / "Requiem for a Dream"	10; 10; 10	10; 10; 10	10; 10; 10	10; 10; 10	Winner

== Selected filmography ==
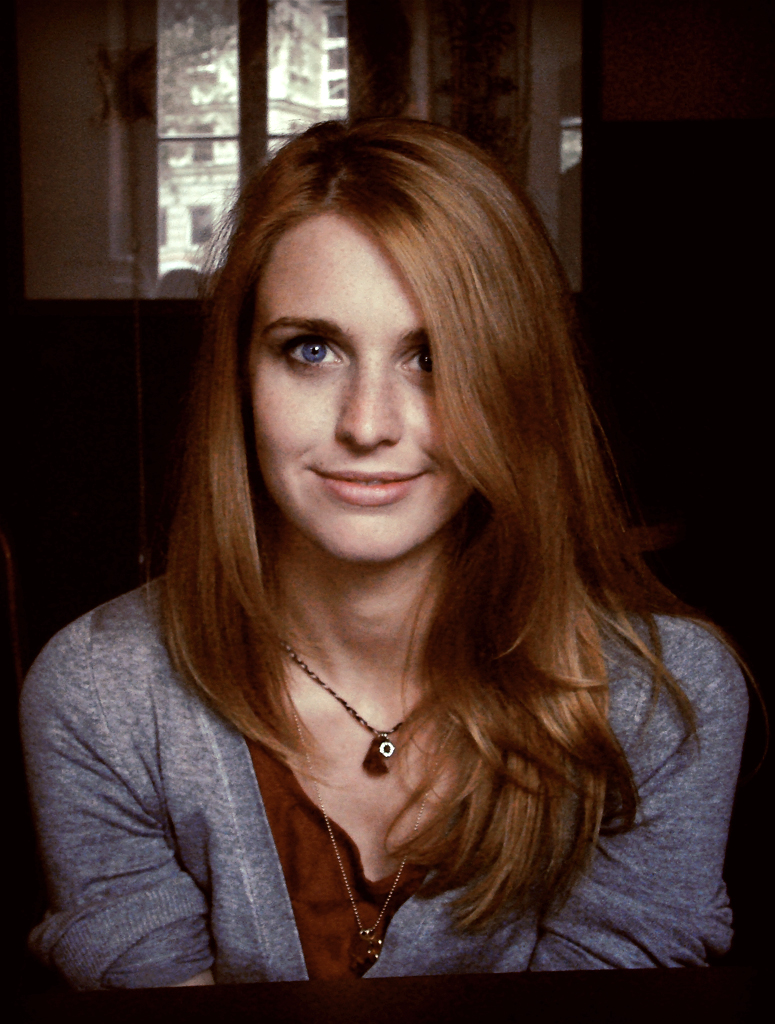
Julia Kamińska (2012)

Year	Title	Role
2005	Pełną Parą	Agnieszka Niwinska
2007	Dylematu, 5	Cięta
2007	Barwy szczęścia	Majka (guest)
2007	W stepie szerokim	Fan
2008	Mniejsze zło	beautiful women
2008, 2009, since 2020	BrzydUla	Ula
2012	Reguły Gry	Natasza
2013	Swing	Agnieszka
2015, 2016	Singielka	Natalia Nowacka, sister of Ela
2018	Narzeczony na niby	Karina
