= Titina =

Titina is a feminine given name. Notable people with the name include:

- Titina De Filippo (1898–1963), Italian actress and playwright
- Titina Loizidou, party in a landmark European legal case
- Titina Medeiros (1977–2026), Brazilian actress
- Titina Mocoroa (d. 2001), Argentine physicist
- Titina Silá (1943–1973), Bissau-Guinean soldier

== Other uses ==
- Titina (film), 2022 animated feature film directed by Kajsa Næss
