= Katarzyna Grochola =

Polish writer and journalist

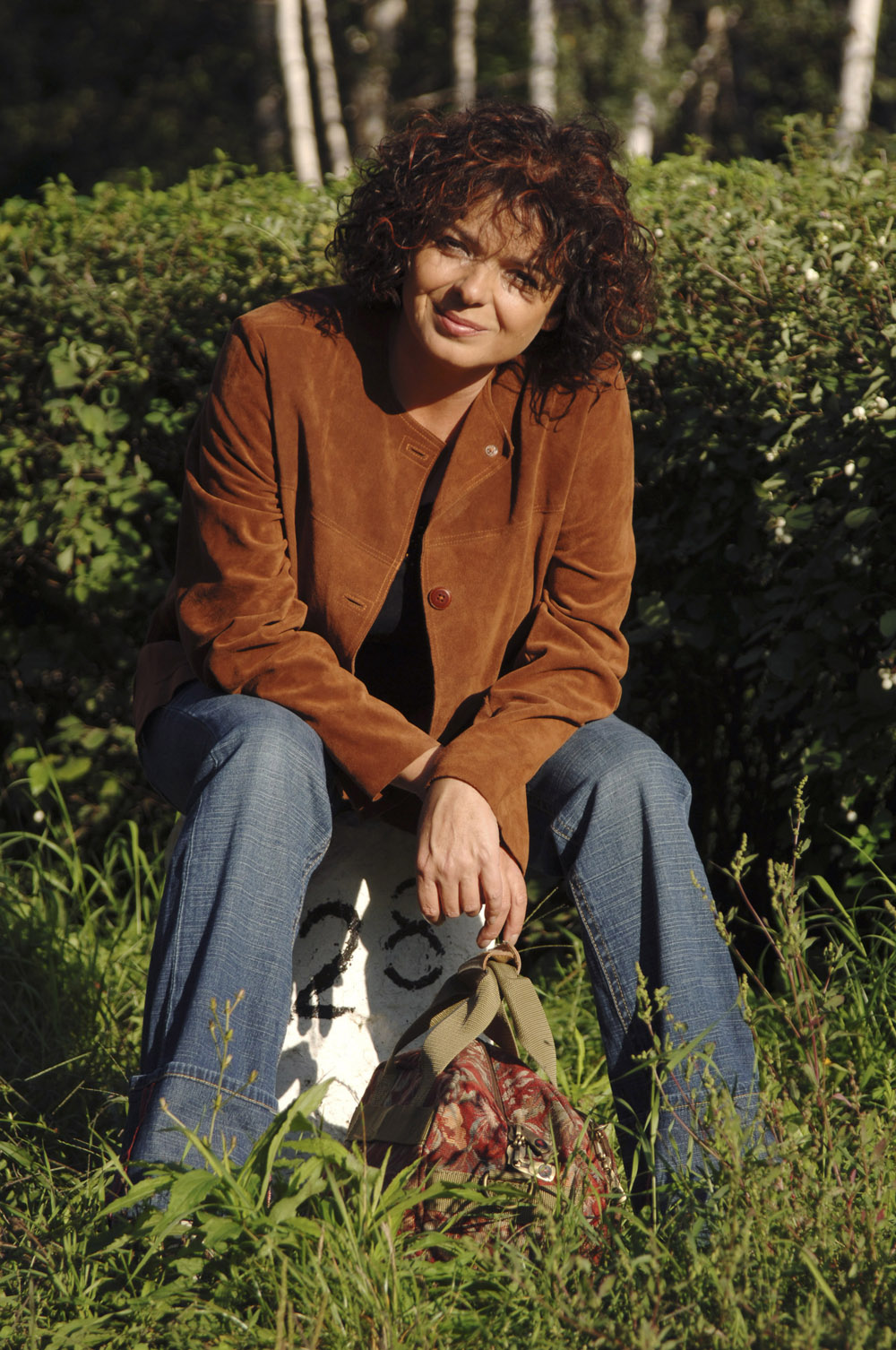
- Katarzyna Grochola, September 2006
- Born: Katarzyna Grochola; 18 July 1957 (age 68); Krotoszyn, Poland
- Known for: Literature
- Awards: Tespis Award 2000:* Pozwól mi odejść:* Kot mi schudł* As EMPiK-u Award 2001 and 2002:* Nigdy w życiu!
- Website: http://www.grochola.pl

Katarzyna Grochola (Polish pronunciation: [kataˈʐɨna ɡrɔˈxɔla]; born 18 July 1957) is a Polish writer and journalist.

== Biography ==
Grochola was born in Krotoszyn, Poland. Her mother was a specialist in Polish studies and her father was a lawyer. She finished Juliusz Słowacki Grammar School in Warsaw. She always wanted to become a writer but by the time she took up writing she worked as a hospital attendant, a consultant in a marriage bureau, and a confectioner's assistant. She cooperated with magazines like Jestem and Poradnik domowy. Grochola has a daughter named Dorota Szelągowska who is a journalist and a grandson – Antoni. She participated in XI edition of Dancing with the Stars broadcast by TVN channel and together with her dance partner, Jan Klimek, took third place. In Poland her books were immensely popular and sold 5 million copies. Grochola's collection of stories Podanie o miłość was translated into Russian and her novel Nigdy w Życiu! into Russian, German and Slovak. Nigdy w Życiu! was advertised as a Polish Bridget Jones but it met with cool reception of literary criticism. The author was accused of pandering to lowbrow tastes and of copying western patterns, yet the commercial success of this book (as well as her following books) proved how great is the demand in Poland for such an attractive popular literature. Nigdy w Życiu!, the first volume of the “Żaby i Anioły” series, was the greatest bestseller among Polish books in 2001. In February 2004 a movie by the same title was released under the direction of Ryszard Zatorski, with Danuta Stenka starring as Judyta. The second volume published in 2002, Serce na temblaku, achieved enormous success. Third part of the series, entitled Ja wam pokażę was also adapted for the screen - this time the leading part was portrayed by Grażyna Wolszczak.

Katarzyna Grochola is also a columnist and co-scriptwriter of one of the most popular Polish TV series such as: M jak miłość and Na dobre i na złe. Osobowość Ćmy, a new novel that was released on 15 April 2005 was the first book to be published by Grochola's own publishing house, Wydawnictwo Autorskie.

== Works ==
=== Novels ===
- Przegryźć dżdżownicę (1997)
- Nigdy w życiu! (2001)
- Serce na temblaku (2002)
- Ja wam pokażę! (2004)
- Osobowość ćmy (2005)
- A nie mówiłam! (2006)
- Trzepot skrzydeł (2008)
- Kryształowy Anioł (2009)
- Zielone drzwi (2010)
- Makatka (2011)
- Houston, mamy problem (2012)
- Przeznaczeni (2016)
- Zranic Marionetke (2019)
- Zjadacz czerni 8 (2021)

=== Collections of stories ===
- Podanie o miłość (2001)
- Zdążyć przed pierwszą gwiazdką (2002)
- Upoważnienie do szczęścia (2003)
- Troche wiekszy poniedziałek (2013)
- Zagubione Niebo (2014)
- Pocieszki (2018)

=== Interviews with psychotherapist ===
- Związki i rozwiązki miłosne (2002)
- Gry i zabawy małżeńskie i pozamałżeńskie (2006).

=== Plays ===
- Pozwól mi odejść
- Kot mi schudł

== Awards ==
Katarzyna Grochola received 4 awards for her plays Pozwól mi odejść and Kot mi schudł in a dramatic contest Tespis 2000. Also one of her novels, Nigdy w życiu!, received an award in AS EMPiK-u contest in 2001 and 2002 and Zielone drzwi was hailed as a Bestseller of 2010.
