= Grażyna Brodzińska =

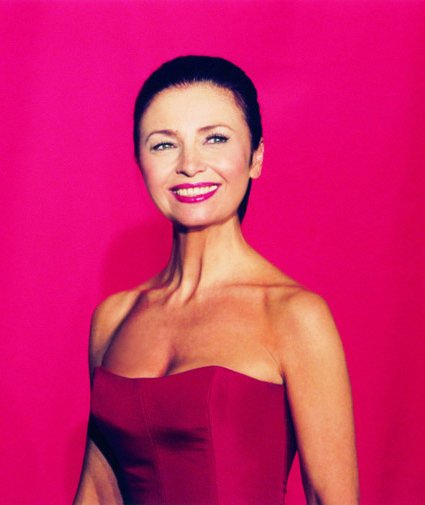

Background information
- Birth name: Grażyna Wayda
- Born: May 3, 1951 (age 74); Kraków, Poland
- Genres: Operetta
- Occupation: Singer
- Years active: 1969–

Grażyna Brodzińska (née Wayda; born May 5, 1951) is a Polish soprano singer in opera and operetta, and musical actress, nicknamed "The First Lady of Polish Operetta".

== Biography ==
Brodzińska was born on May 5, 1951, in Kraków, the daughter of director Edmund Wayda and opera singer Irena Brodzińska. In 1960s she graduated from Danuta Baduszkowa's Actors Studio in Gdynia.

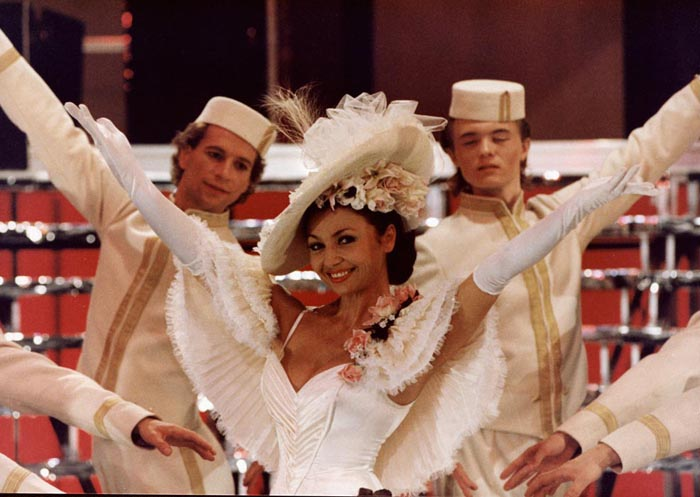
Brodzińska in performance

Grażyna Brodzińska performed at Musical Theatre in Gdynia (1969–1976) and later at Musical Theatre in Szczecin, Warsaw Operetta and Roma Theatre in Warsaw. Since 2002 Brodzińska is an actress of Silesian Operetta in Gliwice.

== Discography ==
- 2008 Sway – Kołysz mnie
- 2002 Śpiewaj, kochaj
- 1999 Najpiękniejsze kolędy
- 1998 Pardon Madame
- 1997 Jestem zakochana – 12 najpiękniejszych arii operetkowych
