= Anna Gornostaj =

Polish actress (born 1960)

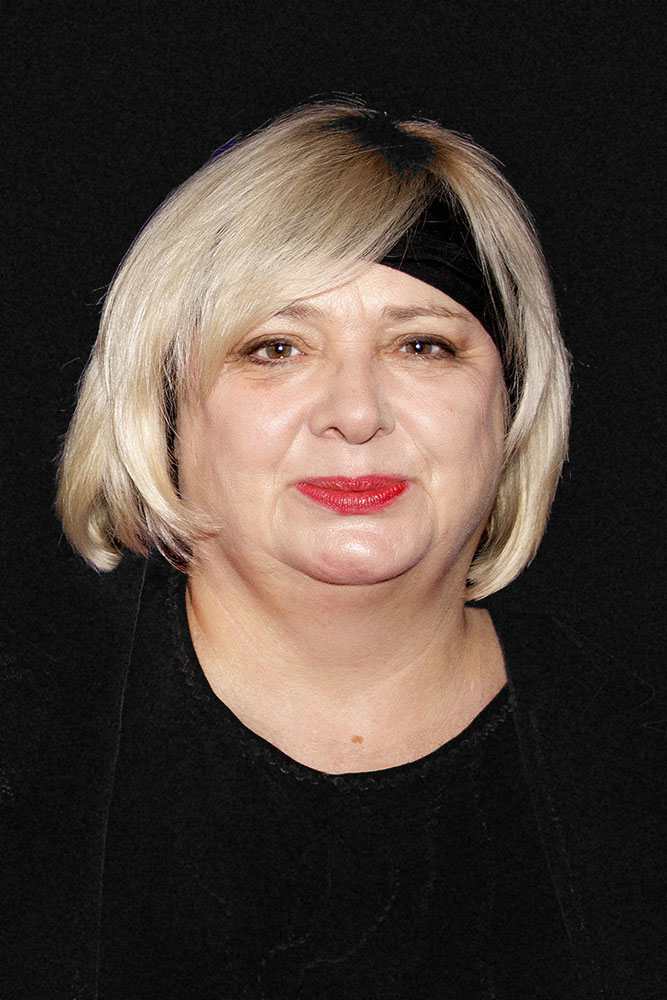
Anna Gornostaj, 2012

Anna Gornostaj (born February 23, 1960 in Warsaw) is a Polish actress. She appeared in the television series Aby do świtu... in 1992.
