= Piotr Jankowski =

Geographer and geographic information scientist

Piotr Jankowski is a geographer and geographic information scientist whose research includes spatial decision-support systems, public participation geographic information systems (PPGIS), spatial multicriteria analysis, and uncertainty and sensitivity analysis in spatial models. He received an M.S. from Poznań University of Economics and Business and a Ph.D. from the University of Washington. He held faculty appointments at the University of Idaho, the Institute for Geoinformatics at the University of Münster, and San Diego State University. He also held visiting appointments at the University of Otago in New Zealand and in Ireland. In 2019, he held a Fulbright Distinguished Chair in Humanities and Social Sciences at Adam Mickiewicz University in Poznań.

== Academic work ==
Jankowski's research has examined the use of geographic information systems in decision analysis. His publications on spatial multicriteria evaluation address the combination of GIS with multicriteria decision-making, including applications to route selection and map-centred exploratory decision analysis.

His publications on spatial decision-support systems include studies of tools for collaborative spatial decision-making. These studies examined the use of maps, analytical models, and group interaction in decisions involving multiple participants and competing objectives. He later co-authored a review of the development of spatial decision-support systems over three decades.

In public participation GIS, Jankowski has written about the use of geospatial technologies in community-based environmental decision-making. With Timothy Nyerges, he co-authored GIS for Group Decision Making and Regional and Urban GIS: A Decision Support Approach. The first book was reviewed in Environment and Planning B: Planning and Design. The second was reviewed in planning and geography journals.

== Professional service ==
Jankowski is editor-in-chief of Open Geosciences. In 2021, he was general chair of the 11th International Conference on Geographic Information Science.
