= Aldona Orman =

Polish actress (born 1968)

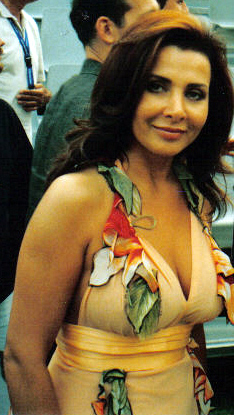
- Born: 1 January 1968 (age 58); Przedbórz, Poland
- Occupation: actress
- Years active: since 1989

Aldona Orman (born 1 January 1968) is a Polish actress.

Aldona Orman was born in Przedbórz, but when she was three months old her family moved to Końskie. There she finished primary school and high school (liceum ogólnokształcące). When Aldona was at high school, she wanted to be a doctor.

After matura Aldona Orman started study at Department of Puppetry at Faculty in Wrocław of Ludwik Solski Academy for the Dramatic Arts. As a student, she made her theatre debut on 10 February 1989 in Polish Theatre in Wrocław. Aldona played Martha Babakin in Ivanov of Anton Chekhov. In 1991 she finished Department of Puppetry at Faculty in Wrocław of Ludwik Solski Academy for the Dramatic Arts.

After the death of her mother Aldona moved to Germany, where her fiancé lived. In this country Orman worked as a theatre actress. She played in Theater Labor, Modernes Theater, Werkstatt Theater and Patos-Transport Theater in Munich.

In 2001 Orman returned to Poland. In 2001 she fall ill of sepsis. After three weeks in hospital she was treated.

== Filmography ==
- 1997: Lata i dni
- 1998-1999: Życie jak poker
- 2000: To my
- 2000-2001: Adam i Ewa
- 2000-2008, 2012: Klan
- 2003: Tygrysy Europy
- 2004-2008: Pierwsza miłość
