= Katarzyna Glinka =

Polish actress and television presenter

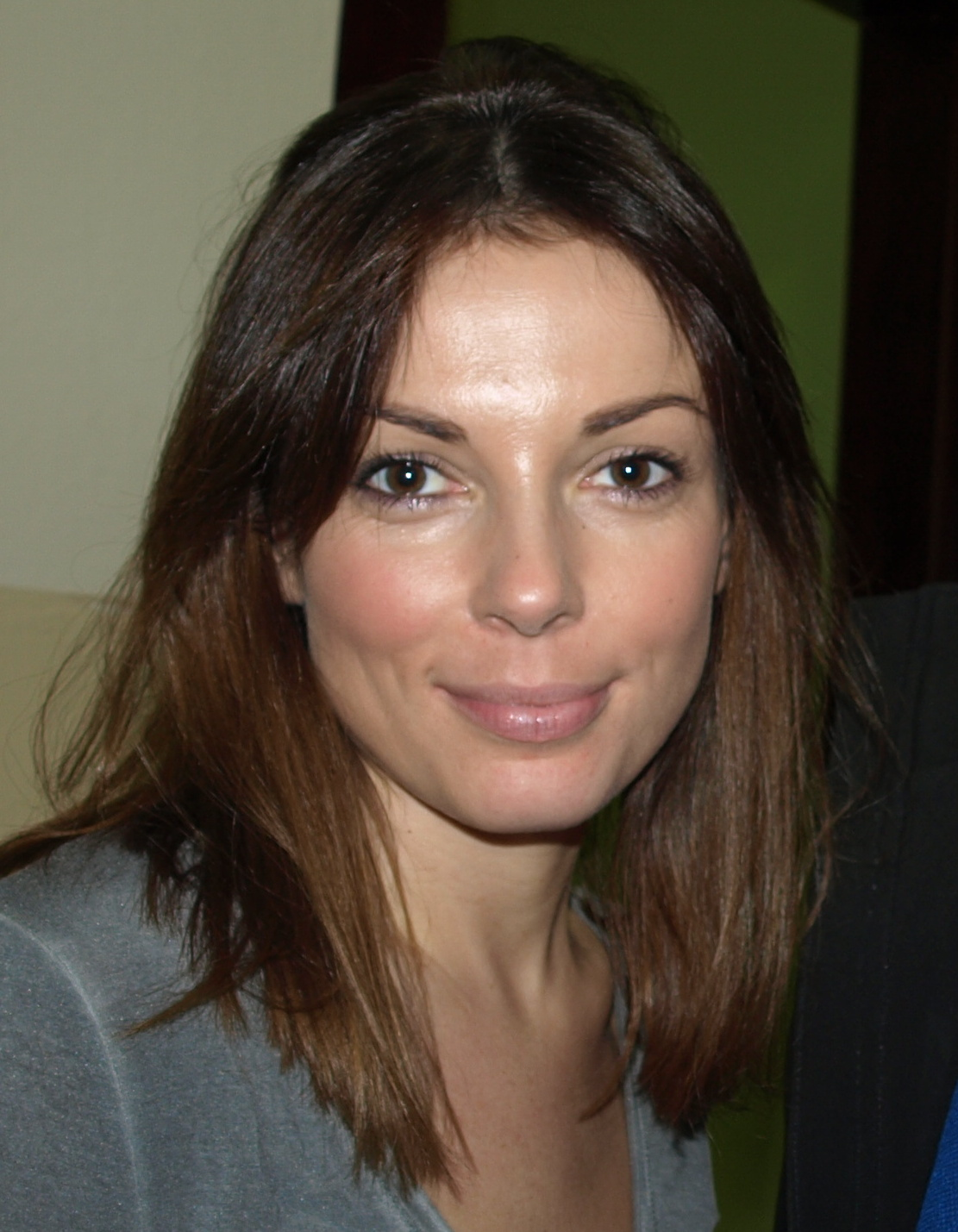
- Katarzyna Glinka in 2013
- Pronunciation: [kataˈʐɨna ˈɡlinka]
- Born: 19 April 1977 (age 49); Świdnica, Poland
- Education: National Film School in Łódź
- Occupations: Actress, TV presenter
- Years active: 2001–present
- Employer: Kwadrat Theatre in Warsaw
- Television: Fort Boyard
- Children: 2

Katarzyna Glinka (Polish: [kataˈʐɨna ˈɡlinka]; born 19 April 1977) is a Polish film and theatre actress and television presenter.

== Biography ==
She graduated from the Secondary High School and Secondary Music School of the first degree in Dzierżoniów. In 2001 she graduated from the Acting Faculty of the National Film School in Łódź.

She made her theatre debut on 23 February 2002 at the Stefan Jaracz Theatre in Olsztyn.

Since 2007, she has played Kasia Górka in the Polish soap opera Barwy szczęścia, which made her nationally known. Also in 2007, she participated in the program Gwiazdy tańczą na lodzie. In 2008 she became an actress at the Kwadrat Theatre in Warsaw. In 2008–2009 she co-hosted the game show Fort Boyard. From 2009 to 2010, she played Roma in the Polish series Tancerze.

In 2010, together with Stefano Terrazzino, she became a finalist of the eleventh edition of Taniec z gwiazdami, and was ranked 51st in the ranking of the 100 most valuable Polish show business stars by Forbes. In 2011 she was nominated for the Złota Kaczka Award for her role in Och, Karol 2.

She played Marta, the main character in the Polish comedy Wkręceni (2014). In 2015, she participated in the fourth edition of the show Twoja twarz brzmi znajomo, and she donated the prize for winning the seventh episode (a check worth 10,000 PLN) to Fundacja Spełnionych Marzeń. Between 2017 and 2018, she played Matylda in the Polsat soap opera Przyjaciółki.

== Private life ==
She has lived in Warsaw since 2003. She was married to Przemysław Gołdon, with whom she has a son Filip (born 2 February 2012). As of 2019, she is engaged to Jarosław Bieniecki, with whom she has a son Leo (born 5 May 2020).

== Filmography ==
- 2002–2004: Klan, as Dominika Szulc, Agnieszka's and Tomek's college friend
- 2002: Szpital na perypetiach, as nurse Aśka "Nowa"
- 2002–2003: Samo życie, as Justyna, Czarek's girlfriend
- 2003: Lokatorzy, as Iga Morawska
- 2003: Kasia i Tomek, as a girl
- 2004: Panienki, as Celina
- 2004–2005: Na dobre i na złe, as nurse Karina
- 2005: Zakręcone, as Celina
- 2005: Kryminalni, as Klaudia (episode 29)
- 2006: Francuski numer, as Magda's friend
- 2006: My Baby, as Jola Kurowska, Zosia's friend
- 2006–2007: Pierwsza miłość, as orderly Justyna Zarzecka
- 2007: Niania, as Patrycja
- 2007: Dlaczego nie!, as receptionist
- 2007–present: Barwy szczęścia, as Kasia Górka
- 2009–2010: Tancerze, as Roma Kowalska
- 2011: Wyjazd integracyjny, as model Gabi
- 2011: Och, Karol 2, as Adrianna Matysik
- 2012: Od pełni do pełni, as Lenka Lipowska
- 2014: Wkręceni, as Marta
- 2014: Karol, który został świętym, as Małgorzata, Kacper's mother
- 2016: 7 rzeczy, których nie wiecie o facetach, as Dominika
- 2017-2018: Przyjaciółki, as Matylda
- 2017: Na układy nie ma rady, as Renata Niewiadomska
- 2017: Daleko od noszy. Reanimacja, as nurse Rita Różalska
- 2021: Komisarz Mama

== Polish dubbing ==
- 2003: Girls in love
- 2008: Tinker Bell, as Silvermist
- 2009: Tinker Bell and the Lost Treasure, as Silvermist
- 2010: Megamind, as Roxanne Ritchie
- 2010: Tinker Bell and the Great Fairy Rescue, as Silvermist
- 2011: Tinker Bell and the Secret of the Wings, as Silvermist
- 2014: The Pirate Fairy, as Silvermist
- 2015: Tinker Bell and the Legend of the NeverBeast, as Silvermist
