= Letters to Santa 2 =

- Directed by: Maciej Dejczer
- Written by: Marcin Baczyński; Mariusz Kuczewski
- Produced by: Przemysław Malec
- Cinematography: Marian Prokop
- Edited by: Jarosław Barzan
- Music by: Łukasz Targosz
- Production company: TVN
- Distributed by: Kino Świat
- Release date: 13 November 2015
- Running time: 104 minutes
- Country: Poland
- Language: Polish

Letters to Santa 2 (Polish: Listy do M. 2), is a 2015 Polish-language romantic comedy film, directed by Maciej Dejczer, that is a sequel to 2011 Letters to Santa film by Mitja Okorn. The action takes place during a Christmas Eve, and follows the lives of characters from the first film, focusing on various aspects of love as shown through separate stories involving a wide variety of individuals, many of whom are shown to be interlinked as the tales progress. As same as in the first film, its plot refers to the 2003 romantic comedy Love Actually, though the events of differ in those films. The movie was produced by TVN, and distributed by Kino Świat. It was filmed in Warsaw, Poland, and premiered on 13 November 2015.

== Cast ==
- Maciej Stuhr as Mikołaj Konieczny
- Roma Gąsiorowska as Doris
- Tomasz Karolak as Melchior "Mel Gibson", Kazik's father
- Agnieszka Dygant as Karina Lisiecka, Szczepan's ex-wife
- Piotr Adamczyk as Szczepan Lisiecki, Karina's ex-husband
- Agnieszka Wagner as Małgorzata, Wojciech's wife
- Wojciech Malajkat as Wojciech, Małgorzata's husband
- Paweł Małaszyński as Wladi, Santa Claus Agency manager, Tomek's boyfriend
- Marcin Stec as Tomek, Wladi's boyfriend
- Katarzyna Zielińska as Betty, Małgorzata's sister, Kazik's mother
- Katarzyna Bujakiewicz as "Larwa", Doris's friend
- Jakub Jankiewicz as Kostek Konieczny, Mikołaj's son
- Ariana Kupczyński as Wiktoria, Kostek's girlfriend
- Julia Wróblewska as Tosia, adopted daughter of Małgorzata and Wojciech
- Anna Matysiak as Majka, daughter of Karina and Szczepan
- Maciej Zakościelny as Robert "Redo" Bartosiewicz
- Jan Sączek as Antoś
- Małgorzata Kożuchowska as Antoś's mother
- Jan Cięciara as Kuba, Antoś's older brother
- Marcin Perchuć as Karol, Betty's boyfriend
- Magdalena Lamparska as Magda, Santa Clause Agency worker
- Nikodem Rozbicki as Sebastian, Majka's boyfriend
- Marta Żmuda Trzebiatowska as Monika, Redo's girlfriend
- Mateusz Winek as Kazik, Betty's and Melchior's son
- Waldemar Błaszczyk as Antoś's father
- Katarzyna Chrzanowska as Magda's mother
- Sławomir Holland as Magda's father
- Małgorzata Pieczyńska as Monika's sister
- Krzysztof Stelmaszyk as Monika's father
- Piotr Głowacki as a passerby

== Sequels ==
The movie has three sequels, Letters to Santa 3 in 2017, Letters to Santa 4 in 2021, Letters to Santa 5 in 2022, and Letters to Santa 6 in 2024.

== See also ==
- List of Christmas films
