= Letters to Santa 3 =

- Directed by: Tomasz Konecki
- Written by: Marcin Baczyński; Mariusz Kuczewski
- Produced by: Marta Grela-Gorostiza; Karolina Izert
- Cinematography: Marian Prokop
- Edited by: Jarosław Barzan
- Music by: Łukasz Targosz
- Production company: TVN
- Distributed by: Kino Świat
- Release date: 10 November 2017
- Running time: 109 minutes
- Country: Poland
- Language: Polish

Letters to Santa 3 (Polish: Listy do M. 3) is a 2017 Polish-language romantic comedy film, directed by Tomasz Konecki, and written by Marcin Baczyński and Mariusz Kuczewski. It premiered on 10 November 2017.

The film is a continuation of Letters to Santa from 2011, and Letters to Santa 2 from 2015. It was continued with Letters to Santa 4 in 2020, and Letters to Santa 5 in 2022.

== Plot ==
The events take place on the Christmas Eve. Melchior "Mel", attempts to track down his son, who has left to find his long-lost grandfather; Karolina, who works in a radio station, unexpectedly meets the love of her live; and Wojciech tries to put his life back together after death of his wife.

== Cast ==
- Wojciech Malajkat as Wojciech
- Tomasz Karolak as Melchior "Mel"
- Piotr Adamczyk as Szczepan Lisiecki
- Agnieszka Dygant as Karina Lisiecka
- Izabela Kuna as Agata
- Magdalena Różczka as Karolina
- Borys Szyc as Gibon
- Andrzej Grabowski as Czarek
- Filip Pławiak as Rafał
- Katarzyna Zawadzka as Zuza
- Mateusz Winek as Kazik
- Danuta Stenka as Rudolph the Red-Nosed Reindeer
- Stanisława Celińska as Stasia
- Zbigniew Zamachowski as Boguś
- Bartosz Obuchowicz as Penguin
- Hanna Śleszyńska as Jadzia
- Grażyna Szapołowska as Krysia
- Kamila Kamińska as Weronika
- Marcin Kwaśny as Andrzej
- Anna Matysiak as Majka Lisiecka
- Nikodem Rozbicki as Sebastian
- Weronika Wachowska as Dusia
- Julia Wróblewska as Tosia
- Agnieszka Wagner as Małgorzata
- Krzysztof Kowalewski as an elderly man
- Tomasz Sapryk as a police officer
- Barbara Garstka as a snowflake

== Production ==
The film is a continuation of Letters to Santa from 2011, and Letters to Santa 2 from 2015. It was directed by directed by Tomasz Konecki, written by Marcin Baczyński and Mariusz Kuczewski, and produced by Marta Grela-Gorostiza and Karolina Izert. The music was done by Łukasz Targosz, cinematography by Marian Prokop, editing by Jarosław Barzan, scenography by Joanna Kaczyńska, and costiumes by Dorota Roqueplo. The film was produced by TVN, and distributed by Kino Świat. It was filmed from 26 January to 29 March 2017 in Warsaw and Piotrków Trybunalski.
