= List of Polish films of 2017 =

The Polish film industry produced over one hundred feature films in 2017. This article fully lists all non-pornographic films, including short films, that had a release date in that year and which were at least partly made by Polish. It does not include films first released in previous years that had release dates in 2017. Also included is an overview of the major events in Polish film, including film festivals and awards ceremonies, as well as lists of those films that have been particularly well received, both critically and financially.

== Major releases ==
Opening		Title	Cast and Crew	Studio	Genre(s)	Ref.
J A N U A R Y	9	Convoy	Director: Maciej Żak; Cast: Janusz Gajos	Profil Film	Thriller	
J A N U A R Y	27	The Art of Loving. Story of Michalina Wisłocka	Director: Maria Sadowska; Cast: Magdalena Boczarska, Piotr Adamczyk, Karolina Gruszka	Agora S.A. / Orange S.A. / TVN S.A.	Biography, Comedy, Drama	
F E B R U A R Y	12	Spoor	Director: Agnieszka Holland, Katarzyna Adamik; Cast: Agnieszka Mandat-Grabka, Wiktor Zborowski, Jakub Gierszał	Studio Filmowe "Tor"	Crime, Drama, Mystery	
F E B R U A R Y	24	Advice for Betrayal	Director: Ryszard Zatorski; Cast: Magdalena Lamparska, Mikołaj Roznerski, Anna Dereszowska	Kino Świat / TVN S.A.	Comedy, Romance	
M A R C H	10	Cursed	Director: Konrad Lecki; Cast: Wojciech Niemczyk, Janusz Chabior, Robert Wrzosek	Fundacja Między Słowami	Drama, History, Thriller	
M A R C H	24	Amok	Director: Katarzyna Adamik; Cast: Mateusz Kościukiewicz, Łukasz Simlat, Zofia Wichłacz	Dione Film / K&K Selekt Film / Kino Świat	Crime, Thriller	
J U N E	12	Volta	Director: Juliusz Machulski; Cast: Andrzej Zieliński, Olga Bołądź, Aleksandra Domańska	Canal+ Poland / Polish Film Institute / Studio Filmowe Zebra	Comedy, Crime	
S E P T E M B E R	15	Double Trouble	Director: Marta Karwowksa; Cast: Hanna Hryniewicka, Jakub Janota-Bzowski, Piotr Głowacki, Roma Gąsiorowska, Joanna Szczepkowska	DI Factory / Koi Studio	Adventure, Family	
S E P T E M B E R	21	Habit and Armour	Director: Paweł Pitera; Cast: Stacy Keach	Arkana Studio / Artbox / LRT	History, Documentary	
S E P T E M B E R	27	Botoks	Director: Patryk Vega; Cast: Olga Bołądź, Agnieszka Dygant, Katarzyna Warnke, Marieta Żukowska	Vega Investments	Thriller	
O C T O B E R	13	Agreement	Director: Maciej Sobieszczański; Cast: Danuta Stenka, Zofia Wichłacz, Jakub Gierszał	EBH Polska / Polish Film Institute / Studio Filmowe Kalejdoskop	Drama, History	
O C T O B E R	20	Sleep, My Love	Director: Krzysztof Lang; Cast: Andrzej Chyra, Tomasz Schuchardt, Bogusław Linda, Arkadiusz Jakubik, Andrzej Grabowski,	Krakowskie Biuro Festiwalowe / Monolith Films	Crime	
N O V E M B E R	3	Once Upon a Time in November	Director: Andrzej Jakimowski; Cast: Agata Kulesza, Grzegorz Palkowski, Edward Hogg, Jacek Borusiński, Damian Ul	Canal+ Poland / D35 / Gigant Films	Drama	
N O V E M B E R	3	Młynarski. Finale Song	Director: Alicja Albrecht; Cast: Wojciech Młynarski, Janusz Gajos, Janusz Głowacki, Jerzy Derfel, Janusz Sent	Bluescreen / Polish Film Institute / Telewizja Polska	Documentary	
N O V E M B E R	10	Letters from M. 3	Director: Tomasz Konecki; Cast: Tomasz Karolak, Agnieszka Dygant, Piotr Adamczyk, Magdalena Różczka, Borys Szyc	TVN S.A.	Comedy, Romance	
N O V E M B E R	10	The Beksińskis. A Sound and Picture Album	Director: Marcin Borchardt; Cast: Tomasz Fogiel	DAREK DIKTI Biuro Pomysłów / Gdyński Fundusz Filmowy / Polish Film Institute	Documentary	
N O V E M B E R	17	Soyer	Director: Łukasz Barczyk; Cast: Cezary Kołacz, Maciej Musiałowski, Marianna Zydek, Diana Krupa, Kamil Wodka	Łódź Film School	Comedy, Drama	
N O V E M B E R	24	Silent Night	Director: Piotr Domalewski; Cast: Dawid Ogrodnik, Tomasz Ziętek, Agnieszka Suchora, Arkadiusz Jakubik, Maria Dębska	Canal+ Poland / Polish Film Institute / Stowarzyszenie Filmowców Polskich	Drama	
N O V E M B E R	24	Maze of Consciousness	Director: Konrad Niewolski; Cast: Oriana Soika, Ireneusz Czop, Karol Kadłubiec	Virus ProdAction	Crime, Thriller	
D E C E M B E R	1	Heart of Love	Director: Łukasz Ronduda; Cast: Justyna Wasilewska, Jacek Poniedziałek, Magdalena Cielecka	Heliograf / Polish Film Institute	Drama	
D E C E M B E R	8	Chain Reaction	Director: Jakub Pączek; Cast: Małgorzata Mikołajczak, Tomasz Włosok, Bartosz Gelner, Wiktoria Stachowicz	D35 / Kino Świat / Polish Film Institute	Drama	
D E C E M B E R	29	Wild Roses	Director: Anna Jadowska; Cast: Marta Nieradkiewicz, Michał Żurawski, Halina Rasiakówna, Konrad Skolimowski, Natalia Bartnik	Alter Ego Pictures / Canal+ Poland / Polish Film Institute	Drama, Thriller	
