= Letters to Santa 4 =

- Directed by: Patrick Yoka
- Written by: Marcin Baczyński; Mariusz Kuczewski
- Produced by: Tomasz Blachnicki; Maria Pasławska
- Starring: Tomasz Karolak; Agnieszka Dygant; Piotr Adamczyk; Wojciech Malajkat; Izabela Kuna; Borys Szyc
- Cinematography: Marian Prokop
- Edited by: Jarosław Barzan
- Music by: Łukasz Targosz
- Production company: TVN
- Distributed by: Kino Świat
- Release date: 1 February 2021
- Running time: 111 minutes
- Country: Poland
- Language: Polish

Letters to Santa 4 (Polish: Listy do M. 4) is a 2021 Polish-language romantic comedy directed by Patrick Yoka, and written by Marcin Baczyński and Mariusz Kuczewski. It is the fourth installment following the events of the 2011 film Letters to Santa by Mitja Okorn. The action takes place in Warsaw, Poland, during Christmas Eve and follows the lives of characters from the first film, focusing on various aspects of love as shown through separate stories involving a wide variety of individuals, many of whom are shown to be interlinked as the tales progress. As in the first film, its plot refers to the 2003 romantic comedy Love Actually, though the events differ in those films. The film was produced by TVN and distributed by Kino Świat. It premiered on 1 February 2021 on an online streaming service Player.pl. The film was followed by Letters to Santa 5 in 2022, and Letters to Santa 6 in 2024.

== Plot ==
The action takes place in Warsaw, Poland, during Christmas Eve and follows the lives of characters from the first film, focusing on various aspects of love as shown through separate stories involving a wide variety of individuals, many of whom are shown to be interlinked as the tales progress. Melchior "Mel Gibson" (Tomasz Karolak) has to adapt to a new working situation, Karina (Agnieszka Dygant) and Szczepan (Piotr Adamczyk) introduce new unusual parenting methods, Wojciech (Wojciech Malajkat) find himself competing with unexpected adversary for the love of Agata (Iza Kuna), and Karolina (Magdalena Różczka) and Filip (Borys Szyc) have to see if their relationship can survive when another woman is introduced.

== Cast ==
- Tomasz Karolak as Melchior "Mel Gibson"
- Piotr Adamczyk as Szczepan Lisiecki
- Agnieszka Dygant as Karina Lisiecka
- Izabela Kuna as Agata
- Magdalena Różczka as Karolina
- Borys Szyc as Filip
- Wojciech Malajkat as Wojciech
- Danuta Stenka as "Rudolf"
- Mateusz Winek as Kazik
- Weronika Wachowska as Dusia
- Magdalena Boczarska as Dagmara
- Vanessa Aleksander as Monika
- Matylda Radosz as Amelia
- Cezary Pazura as Arek
- Rafał Zawierucha as Stefan
- Michał Zieliński as Igor
- Barbara Wrzesińska as Kornelia
- Stanisław Brudny as Antoni
- Janusz Chabior as Lucek
- Monika Pikuła as Justyna Włodarczyk
- Bartłomiej Nowosielski as Zygmunt
- Paweł Burczyk as Rafał
- Anna Smołowik as Emilia
- Eryk Lubos as Zbyszek
- Joanna Kurowska as Jola
- Paweł Okoński as Krzysztof
- Cezary Kosiński as Karolina's boss
- Robert Wabich as a City Guard officer
- Magdalena Smalara as a City Guard officer

== Production ==
The film was directed by Patrick Yoka, written by Marcin Baczyński and Mariusz Kuczewski, and produced by Tomasz Blachnicki and Maria Pasławska. The editing was done by Jarosław Barzan, cinematography by Marian Prokop, music by Łukasz Targosz, scenography by Marek Warszewski, and costiumes by Małgorzata Bednarek-Chumakou. It was filmed in Warsaw, Poland, in 2020, and produced by TVN. The main cast included Tomasz Karolak, Agnieszka Dygant, Piotr Adamczyk, Wojciech Malajkat, Izabela Kuna, and Borys Szyc. Its production was impacted and temporary halted by the COVID-19 pandemic. Distributed by Kino Świat, the film was originally planned to premiere in cinemas on 4 November 2020. However, due to the pandemic, it was instead released on the online streaming service Player.pl on 1 February 2021.
