= Medics (Polish TV series) =

- Medics cast
- Also known as: Lekarze; Szpital Alicji (production title)
- Genre: Medical Drama
- Written by: Andrzej Staszczyk; Justyna Stefaniak; Marek Kreutz
- Directed by: Filip Zylber; Marcin Wrona
- Starring: Magdalena Różczka; Paweł Małaszyński; Danuta Stenka; Jacek Koman; Katarzyna Bujakiewicz; Agnieszka Więdłocha; Szymon Bobrowski; Piotr Polk; Marcin Perchuć; Wojciech Zieliński
- Composer: Łukasz Targosz
- Country of origin: Poland
- Original language: Polish
- No. of seasons: 5
- No. of episodes: 65 (list of episodes)

Production
- Executive producer: Dariusz Gąsiorowski
- Producer: Dorota Chamczyk
- Production locations: Toruń, Poland
- Cinematography: Jan Holoubek; Tomasz Dobrowolski
- Editors: Krzysztof Boroń; Piotr Kmiecik
- Running time: 45 minutes
- Production company: TVN

Original release
- Network: TVN
- Release: 3 September 2012 – 30 November 2014

Medics (Polish: Lekarze) is a Polish medical drama that aired on TVN from September 3, 2012, to November 30, 2014.

== Plot ==
The series follows Alicja Szymańska (Magdalena Różczka), a young and ambitious surgeon, working at the fictional Copernicus Hospital in Toruń. She becomes part of a team of charismatic doctors dedicated to saving lives and safeguarding their patients’ health—often at the cost of neglecting their own personal struggles and everyday challenges.

== Production ==
On October 10, 2011, it was announced that TVN was developing an upcoming medical drama set in Toruń. The first season, consisting of 13 episodes, began filming in October 2011 under the working title Szpital Alicji (Alicja’s Hospital), and concluded on April 3, 2012. The series title was officially changed to Medics on March 12, 2012.

Following positive reviews, Medics was renewed for a second season on June 19, 2012. Filming for the second season began on July 17, 2012, in Toruń, and concluded on November 20, 2012, in Warsaw. On November 9, 2012, the series was further renewed for a third season, with a fourth season entering production on May 23, 2013, premiering in the spring of 2014.

== Cast ==
- Magdalena Różczka as Alicja Szymańska, surgeon
- Paweł Małaszyński as Maks Keller, surgeon
- Danuta Stenka as Elżbieta Bosak, chief of surgery
- Jacek Koman as Leon Jasiński, surgeon
- Katarzyna Bujakiewicz as Sylwia Matysik, ward nurse
- Agnieszka Więdłocha as Beata Jasińska, anesthesiologist
- Szymon Bobrowski as Piotr Wanat, gynaecologist
- Piotr Polk as Krzysztof Florczyk, surgeon
- Marcin Perchuć as Adam Gajewski "Jivan", general practitioner
- Wojciech Zieliński as Daniel Orda, surgeon
- Julia Krynke as Mira Ziemska

== Series synopsis ==
=== Season 1 ===
Alicja Szymańska (Magdalena Różczka), a young and ambitious surgeon, leaves Warsaw and relocates to Toruń. There, she begins working at Copernicus Hospital, managed by Elżbieta Bosak (Danuta Stenka). The new position provides her with an opportunity to advance her medical career.

=== Season 2 ===
Filming for the second season began on July 17, 2012 in Toruń and concluded on November 20, 2012 in Warsaw. Season 2 premiered on February 25, 2013.

=== Season 3 ===
Season 3 premiered in September 2013. The season finale featured the first appearance of Wojciech Mecwaldowski as Michał Karkoszka.

=== Season 4 ===
The fourth season aired in March 2014. Paweł Małaszyński departed the series in the season premiere. Wojciech Mecwaldowski was added to the main cast, while Anna Polony’s role was expanded to a recurring character.

=== Season 5 ===
Borys Szyc joined the cast as Przemysław Karski. In Episode 7, Olga Bołądź was introduced as Anna Bogna Zaniewska, a new neurosurgeon. The final episode featured the debut of Bartosz Porczyk as Anna’s mysterious ex-boyfriend.

=== Cancellation ===
On November 8, 2014, it was announced that the series would not be renewed for a sixth season due to declining viewership and low ratings.

== Ratings ==
Medics premiered on TVN on Monday, September 3, 2012, at 9:30 p.m. and attracted an audience of 2.94 million. It received an audience share of 24.2% among 16-49 year-olds, and 23.6% among all viewers, making it the most-watched program in its time slot.

List of ratings by series
Series	Episodes	Timeslot	Series premiere	Series finale	TV season	Viewers (millions)	Average share (4+)	Average share (16-49)
1	13	Monday 9:30 p.m.	3 September 2012	26 November 2012	Autumn 2012	3.05	23.1%	23.9%
2	13	Monday 9:30 p.m.	25 February 2013	27 May 2013	Spring 2013	2.77	20.3%	21.2%
3	13	Monday 9:30 p.m.	2 September 2013	25 November 2013	Autumn 2013	2.72	20.1%	21.3%
4	13	Sunday 8 p.m.	2 March 2014	25 May 2014	Spring 2014	2.34	13.8%	15.4%
5	13	Sunday 9 p.m.	7 September 2014	30 November 2014	Autumn 2014	TBA	TBA	TBA
