= List of Polish films of the 2000s =

A list of films produced in Poland in the 2000s.

Title	Director	Cast	Genre	Notes
2000
Boys Don't Cry	Olaf Lubaszenko	Maciej Stuhr, Wojciech Klata	Crime comedy	
Keep Away from the Window	Jan Jakub Kolski			Entered into the 23rd Moscow International Film Festival
Life as a Fatal Sexually Transmitted Disease	Krzysztof Zanussi			Won the Golden St. George at Moscow
A Very Christmas Story	Dariusz Zawislak			
2001
Edges of the Lord	Yurek Bogayevicz			
Quo Vadis	Jerzy Kawalerowicz	Paweł Deląg, Magdalena Mielcarz		
The Hexer	Marek Brodzki	Michał Żebrowski, Zbigniew Zamachowski		
2002
Chopin: Desire for Love	Jerzy Antczak	Piotr Adamczyk		
Day of the Wacko	Marek Koterski	Marek Kondrat	Comedy	
The Revenge	Andrzej Wajda	Roman Polanski, Janusz Gajos, Andrzej Seweryn, Katarzyna Figura, Daniel Olbrychski		
The Supplement	Krzysztof Zanussi			Entered into the 24th Moscow International Film Festival
Where Eskimos Live	Tomasz Wiszniewski	Bob Hoskins, Sergiusz Żymełka		
2003
An Ancient Tale: When the Sun Was a God	Jerzy Hoffman		Historical, Fantasy, War	
Distant Lights	Hans-Christian Schmid			
Pornografia	Jan Jakub Kolski			
Segment '76	Oskar Kaszynski		Comedy	Set in 1976
2004
The Wedding	Wojtek Smarzowski			
2005
The Collector	Feliks Falk	Janusz Morgenstern	Drama	
Karol: A Man Who Became Pope	Giacomo Battiato	Piotr Adamczyk, Małgosia Bela, Raoul Bova	Biographical, Religious	
The Master	Piotr Trzaskalski			
Pitbull	Patryk Vega	Marcin Dorociński, Janusz Gajos	Action crime	
2006
13 lat 13 minut	Marek Maldis		Historical	
The Boy on the Galloping Horse	Adam Guziński			Screened at the 2006 Cannes Film Festival
The Garden of Earthly Delights	Lech Majewski			
Karol: The Pope, The Man	Giacomo Battiato	Piotr Adamczyk	Biographical, Religious	
Strike	Volker Schlöndorff	Katharina Thalbach, Andrzej Chyra, Dominique Horwitz		
Retrieval	Sławomir Fabicki			Screened at the 2006 Cannes Film Festival
We're All Christs	Marek Koterski |Marek Kondrat, Andrzej Chyra			
Who Never Lived	Andrzej Seweryn	Michał Żebrowski		Entered into the 28th Moscow International Film Festival
2007
Dlaczego nie!	Ryszard Zatorski			
Hope	Stanisław Mucha	Rafał Fudalej, Wojciech Pszoniak		Entered into the 29th Moscow International Film Festival
Katyń	Andrzej Wajda	Maja Ostaszewska, Danuta Stenka; Artur Żmijewski	Historical film	
Jutro idziemy do kina	Michał Kwieciński			
Nightwatching	Peter Greenaway			
Ryś	Stanisław Tym			
Strajk				
Tricks	Andrzej Jakimowski			
Świadek koronny				
Tomasz Konecki, Andrzej Saramonowicz	Piotr Adamczyk, Borys Szyc, Maciej Stuhr			
U Pana Boga w ogródku	Jacek Bromski			
Wszystko będzie dobrze	Tomasz Wiszniewski			
Pora mroku	Grzegorz Kuczeriszka			
Ranczo Wilkowyje	Wojciech Adamczyk			
Rezerwat	Łukasz Palkowski			
2008
33 Scenes from Life	Małgorzata Szumowska			
Boisko bezdomnych	Kasia Adamik			
Fundacja				
Ile waży koń trojański?	Juliusz Machulski		Comedy	Set in 1987
Jak żyć?				
Jeszcze raz				
Lejdis				
Lekcje pana Kuki				
Little Moscow				
Nie kłam kochanie				
Rozmowy nocą				
Serce na dłoni				
Skorumpowani				
To nie tak jak myślisz, kotku				
2009
Before Twilight				
Rewers				
All That I Love				
Generał - zamach na Gibraltarze				
Generał Nil				
Janosik. Prawdziwa historia				
Popiełuszko. Wolność jest w nas				
Włatcy móch: Ćmoki, czopki i mondzioły				
Wojna polsko-ruska				
Zwerbowana milosc	Tadeusz Król		Action	Set in 1989
Złoty środek				
