= Letters to Santa 6 =

- Theatrical release poster
- Listy do M. Pożegnania i powroty
- Directed by: Łukasz Jaworski
- Written by: Marcin Baczyński; Mariusz Kuczewski
- Produced by: Katarzyna Czarnecka
- Starring: Tomasz Karolak; Piotr Adamczyk; Agnieszka Dygant; Wojciech Malajkat; Stanisława Celińska; Roma Gąsiorowska; Jacek Borusiński; Czesław Mozil; Maciej Stuhr; Magdalena Walach
- Cinematography: Marian Prokop
- Edited by: Jaroslaw Barzan
- Music by: Łukasz Targosz
- Production company: TVN Warner Bros. Discovery
- Distributed by: Warner Bros. Pictures
- Release date: 7 November 2024
- Running time: 124 minutes
- Country: Poland
- Language: Polish

Letters to Santa 6 (Polish: Listy do M. Pożegnania i powroty, lit. 'Letters to S. Goodbyes and returns') is a 2024 Polish-language romantic comedy directed by Łukasz Jaworski, and written by Marcin Baczyński and Mariusz Kuczewski. It is the sixth installment following the events of the 2011 film Letters to Santa by Mitja Okorn. The action takes place in Warsaw, Poland, during a Christmas Eve and follows the lives of characters from the first film, focusing on various aspects of love as shown through separate stories involving a wide variety of individuals, many of whom are shown to be interlinked as the tales progress. As in the first film, its plot refers to the 2003 romantic comedy Love Actually, though the events differ in those films. The film was produced by TVN Warner Bros. Discovery and distributed by Warner Bros. Entertainment Poland. It premiered on 7 November 2024.

== Plot ==
Melchior continues to work as a Santa Claus imitator and decides to organise a large Christmas Eve dinner, which turns out to be more difficult than he thought. At the same time, his co-worker Grzegorz reminds him of himself, and he tries to warn him from making the same mistakes he did. On Christmas Eve, a pipe bursts in Szczepan and Karina's apartment, flooding it. As such, they are visited by their neighbours, creating a plethora of unexpected situations.

== Cast ==
- Tomasz Karolak as Melchior "Mel Gibson"
- Piotr Adamczyk as Szczepan Lisiecki
- Agnieszka Dygant as Karina Lisiecka
- Wojciech Malajkat as Wojciech Kamiński
- Janusz Chabior as Lucek Brzeski
- Roma Gąsiorowska as Doris
- Andrzej Grabowski as Czarek
- Maciej Stuhr as Mikołaj Konieczny
- Stanisława Celińska as Stasia
- Sebastian Stankiewicz as Misiek
- Magdalena Walach as Ewa
- Jacek Borusiński as Pataszon
- Czesław Mozil as Borygo
- Sławomir Pacek as Ludwiczek
- Kirył Pietruczuk as Grzesiek
- Ina Sobala aw Emilka
- Hiroaki Murakami as Józek
- Mikołaj Cieślak as Staszek
- Ada Fijał as Barbara
- Beata Ścibakówna as Judyta

== Production ==
The film was directed by Łukasz Jaworski, written by Marcin Baczyński and Mariusz Kuczewski, and produced by Katarzyna Czarnecka. The editing was done by Jarosław Barzan, cinematography by Marian Prokop, music by Łukasz Targosz, scenography by Wojciech Żogała, and costumes by Paulina Gomółka. It was filmed in Warsaw, Poland, in 2020, and produced by TVN. The main cast included Tomasz Karolak, Piotr Adamczyk, Agnieszka Dygant, Wojciech Malajkat, Stanisława Celińska, Roma Gąsiorowska, Jacek Borusiński, Czesław Mozil, Maciej Stuhr, and Magdalena Walach. The film premiered on 7 November 2024.
