= Kac Wawa =

- Directed by: Łukasz Karwowski
- Written by: Piotr Czaja
- Produced by: Jacek Samojłowicz
- Starring: Borys Szyc; Michał Żurawski; Antoni Pawlicki; Tomasz Karolak; Michał Milowicz
- Release date: 2 March 2012 (Poland)
- Running time: 39 minutes
- Country: Poland
- Language: Polish
- Box office: $1,184,471

Kac Wawa is a 2012 Polish comedy film directed by Łukasz Karwowski. It tells the story of a group of men, one of whom is getting married, and therefore the others throw a buck's party for him.

== Plot ==
Andrzej is getting married and, on the night before his wedding, he and his friends (Karol, Jarek, Tomek, and Jerzy) meet up in order to play cards for his bachelor party, whereas his fiancé Marta is having her bachelorette party. As she gets more and more drunk and starts wandering across Warsaw, Andrzej and the others are trying to find some prostitutes to keep them company for the rest of the night.

== Cast ==
- Borys Szyc as Andrzej
- Michał Żurawski as Tomasz
- Mariusz Pujszo as Jerzy
- Antoni Pawlicki as Jarek
- Michał Milowicz as Karol
- Sonia Bohosiewicz as Marta
- Aleksandra Nieśpielak as Gocha
- Tomasz Karolak as Silvio
- Przemysław Bluszcz as "Kobyła"
- Mirosław Zbrojewicz as "Kaban"
- Anna Prus as Klaudia
- Roma Gąsiorowska as Sandra

== Reception ==
Some theaters removed the film from the repertoire. A worker of one of those cinemas explained: "We withdrew Kac Wawa because we couldn't sell the tickets. People would leave the cinema while the movie was being shown. After that only one or two people would turn up. We figured we couldn't afford to keep this movie in the repertoire."

Polish critic Tomasz Raczek wrote in his review:

"So I came to see the movie KAC WAWA and I've got to admit, I don't remember the last time I felt so embarrassed at the cinema. This isn't just a bad movie. This movie is like a disease, like a malignant tumor: it kills the faith in cinema and respect for actors."

— Tomacz Raczek, https://natemat.pl/4963,tomasz-raczek-porownal-kac-wawa-do-nowotworu-zlosliwego-producent-pozywa

Producer Jacek Samojłowicz sued Raczek, saying that "according to [his] lawyers, [Raczek] has exceeded the limits of film criticism and breached journalistic ethics, perhaps for personal reasons."

The film's screenwriter, Piotr Czaja, confronted Raczek, accusing him of having failed to understand the message of Kac Wawa. Czaja also stated that he had been given the impression that the viewers liked the film and laughed a lot.

On his Facebook profile, Szyc wrote: "Critics are one-legged theorists of the broad jump. It's easiest to just criticize; especially we Poles love it."

Recipient of the 2013 Snake Award for the worst Polish film.

The film was promoted by a song of the Polish singer Doda with the same title. It was named among the best music videos of February 2012 by Onet.pl.
