= Letters to Santa (film) =

- Polish theatrical release poster
- Directed by: Mitja Okorn
- Written by: Karolina Szablewska; Marcin Baczyński; Sam Akina
- Produced by: Izabela Łopuch; Dariusz Gąsiorowski
- Starring: Roma Gąsiorowska; Maciej Stuhr; Piotr Adamczyk; Agnieszka Dygant; Paweł Małaszyński; Tomasz Karolak; Katarzyna Zielińska
- Cinematography: Marian Prokop
- Edited by: Jarosław Barzan
- Music by: Łukasz Targosz
- Production company: TVN
- Distributed by: ITI Cinema
- Release date: 10 November 2011
- Running time: 116 minutes
- Country: Poland
- Language: Polish
- Box office: $26,923,513

Letters to Santa (Polish: Listy do M.), alternatively known as Letters to St. Nicholas, is a 2011 Polish-language romantic comedy film, directed by Mitja Okorn. The action takes place during one single Christmas Eve, when a few adults find the loves of their lives. The film's plot refers to the 2003 romantic comedy Love Actually, though events of the movie differ from the ones in the 2003 film. It was shot in Warsaw, Poland from 27 January to March 2011. The movie has 4 sequels, Letters to Santa 2 released in 2015, Letters to Santa 3 in 2017, Letters to Santa 4 in 2021, and Letters to Santa 5 in 2022.

== Plot ==
The film Letters to Santa portrays lost characters who discover that what happened to them is love. On this special day of the year, five women and five men are finding out that there is no escape from love and Christmas.

- Doris - A female around 30 years of age. What is most important to her is a loving family. She is not yet married and often wakes up alone in the morning, but this fact has not turned her into a desperate lady hanging on the arm of every encountered guy. She still believes that there's her second half waiting for her somewhere in this big city, and that true love can happen for her.
- Mikołaj - A romantic male who is known for seducing women, mainly on air. In real life, it all looks a bit different. His greatest asset is his specific sense of humor and a deep male voice, stimulating the imagination of listeners who absolutely love it.
- Wladi - many men would like to have his pugnacity and light approach to life. His charm and magic air works for women as an aphrodisiac. He can surprise with an unusual proposition, and in restaurants always foots the bill. It's just that no woman yet has succeeded to ensnare him. Will he finally find someone who discovers the key to his heart?
- Melchior vel Mel Gibson - A testosterone ebullient amateur and admirer of feminine beauty. As hardly anyone works in Ars Amandi. This arrogant, handsome Don Juan is able to seduce with a single glance. The question remains if his narcissistic tendencies allow him to create a lasting relationship?
- Szczepan - A busy psychologist who, like Dirty Harry, rushes to the rescue of the whole World. One day something happens that will destroy his peace of mind and bring him to a boil. What can he do? The excitement reach its zenith.
- Karina - Szczepan's wife, very energetic, believes that love is like air and should be at your fingertips. But what will she do when her husband spends more time working than being absorbed with his beloved woman? Is it a romance without real love?
- Małgorzata - perfect, cold as ice and steadfast as a rock, radio director. Conducts business and her husband, Wojciech, with the same commitment and enduring opposition. Can something be able to knock her out of balance? It seems that nothing really... It turns out, though, that even the ice queen carries a great need for love in her heart.
- Wojciech - The perfect husband, it seems: calm, tolerant, wise. In addition, he knows his wines, and the oldest people do not remember that his wife said "no." Boredom. But even though under the thumb, to his own surprise, he is able to go beyond the rigid framework of routine when something or someone will awake deep hidden longing and feelings.
- Betty - wherever she appears, all eyes are directed only on her. She could have any guy, but the most important is her mysterious Kazik. Who is the man for whom she decided to change her whole life?
- Larwa - wouldn't be a bad bridesmaid material if only her best friend - Doris, married. Larwa from a friend's perspective can enjoy a delightful vision of a successful relationship. She never gives up and can support her lost friend. Her twisted sense of humor works better than Doris's anti-stress mask.

== Cast ==
- Maciej Stuhr as Mikołaj
- Roma Gąsiorowska as Doris
- Agnieszka Dygant as Karina
- Tomasz Karolak as Melchior "Mel Gibson"
- Piotr Adamczyk as Szczepan
- Agnieszka Wagner as Małgorzata
- Wojciech Malajkat as Wojciech
- Katarzyna Zielińska as Betty
- Katarzyna Bujakiewicz as Larwa
- Paweł Małaszyński as Wladi
- Beata Tyszkiewicz as Malina
- Leonard Pietraszak as Florian
- Lech Ordon as grandfather

== Reception ==
=== Box office performance ===
Over the opening weekend the movie drew nearly 400 thousand people (specifically, the film was seen by 367,447 viewers). At the time this was the third best opening by a Polish film in the last 20 years. In its first three weeks the film grossed $6,175,026, and was seen by over a million viewers.

Maciej Dejczer has since produced two sequels to Letters To Santa. The shoot in Warsaw began on 25 February 2015 and finished in April. Branded as "the Polish Love Actually", Letters to Santa 2 continues the genre of romantic comedy with a Christmas theme. The third film was released in 2017, and it became the most popular film of the year in Poland with 2.98 million admissions.

=== Critical reviews ===
The film was positively received by both critics and the general public. It was also appreciated by Duncan Kenworthy, producer of Notting Hill and Love Actually, who said:

The movie is fantastic. And as the audience I think it is both funny and poignant. It's made me feel a sudden craving for Christmas.

== Production ==
Winter weather was not conducive to the production of Letters to Santa. Snowmakers were utilised for the production of artificial snow. Filming began in Kampinos Forest snowstorms and streets of Warsaw. A major challenge for the production was shooting in the popular Arkadia mall. The film crew could only carry out filming at night, although the story takes place across a busy Christmas Eve. There was reportedly a festive atmosphere on set. Katarzyna Bujakiewicz, dressed as a snowflake, sang "Santa Claus Is Coming to Town", Tomak Karolak and Roma Gąsiorowska in beautiful costumes entertained over 150 children and 300 adult extras who played Varsovians participating in last-minute Christmas shopping.

== See also ==
- List of Christmas films
