= Just Love Me =

2006 film by Ryszard Zatorski

- Directed by: Ryszard Zatorski
- Starring: Maciej Zakościelny; Agnieszka Grochowska
- Release date: 20 January 2006
- Running time: 1h 38min
- Country: Poland
- Language: Polish

Just Love Me (Polish: Tylko mnie kochaj) is a 2006 Polish romantic comedy film directed by Ryszard Zatorski. It was awarded the Amber Lion at the Gdynia Film Festival for the highest-grossing film of the year, and was nominated for the Polish Film Award for Best Costumes.

The film was shot from August to October 2005 in Warsaw.

== Plot ==
Michał is a co-owner of an architectural company. He lives in a loose relationship with Agata, who is the second co-owner of the company. A seven-year-old girl, Michalina, knocks on the door of Michał's apartment, claiming to be his daughter. At first, Michał doesn't want to believe the child's words, but then it turns out that she was telling the truth. The man decides to find the girl's mother.

== Overview ==
The film became a hit in Polish cinemas, where it was watched by over 1.6 million viewers. Just Love Me, however, met with unfavorable reactions from critics – the film was accused of naivety and predictability of the script, shallowness of characters, intrusive product placement, poor acting and idealizing reality. However, the role of Julia Wróblewska were praised.

== Cast ==
- Maciej Zakościelny – Michal
- Agnieszka Grochowska – Julia
- Agnieszka Dygant – Agata
- Julia Wróblewska – Michalina
- Grażyna Szapołowska – Julia's mother
- Jan Frycz – Prezes
- Marcin Bosak – Antoni
- Dominika Kluźniak – Lucja
- Tomasz Karolak – Ludwik
- Przemysław Sadowski – Police Officer – Czeslaw
- Danuta Stenka – Judyta Katarzyna Kozlowska
- Artur Żmijewski – Adam
