= Polish-Russian War (film) =

2009 film by Xawery Żuławski

- Directed by: Xawery Żuławski
- Written by: Xawery Żuławski
- Starring: Borys Szyc, Roma Gąsiorowska, Sonia Bohosiewicz
- Cinematography: Marian Prokop
- Edited by: Krzysztof Raczyński
- Music by: Jan Komar, Filip Kuncewicz, Jarosław Karczmarczyk
- Release date: 2009
- Country: Poland
- Language: Polish

Polish-Russian War (Wojna polsko-ruska) is a 2009 Polish film directed by Xawery Żuławski based on the novel Polish-Russian War under the white-red flag by Dorota Masłowska.

== Plot ==
The film's events take place over several days and they are set in the present time in a large Polish city. The main character is a bandit, a Polish dres (a Polish chav) called "Strong" (Borys Szyc), who does not work or study, and who frequently gets into conflict with the law and is in love with Magda (Roma Gąsiorowska). The relationship is not going well. "Strong" is insanely jealous of Magda, but he does not avoid sexual contact with other women. Magda is a blonde keen on going to the tanning salon, obsessed with her alleged overweight and appreciating good cosmetics. She loves "Strong" and hates him at the same time, deceives and manipulates him. She uses the opportunity to have a good time and looking for a rich guy with whom she could leave "to the better countries". Both of them take drugs. Their relationship resembles a continuous scuffle.

After an argument in a bar owned by "Left" (Michał Czernecki) "Strong" meets a "Gothgirl" Angelica (Maria Strzelecka) at night, an aspiring poet dressed in black, also a virgin and pessimist, for whom "suicide is a piece of cake". Angela is the former girlfriend of Robert, the son of Zdzislaw Sztorm, owner of a sand plant. In the morning Natasha Blokus (Sonia Bohosiewicz) appears at house if "Strong". She is a good friend of "Strong". She experiences withdrawal and looks for drugs in the house, but even soup powder satisfies her completely. Nat comes with an idea, a plan of "plucking" Zdzislaw Storm, in which Angela is supposed to help.

"Strong" follows Magda. He turns up at the town festival, where she takes part in a miss competition. He cannot reach her, but instead he meets a volunteer Ala, a girl of his friend Casper, coming from a good family, with whom he spends the afternoon. In Ala's apartment he swallows a handful of painkillers, then, drugged, pees into the cage with parrots, steals worthless trinkets and escapes from the apartment in the woman's coat.

Incoherent, getting around in the city buses "Strong" is accidentally found by "Left". Then they terrorize a clerk in the night fast food bar, wheedling Coke and taking walkie-talkies. The fun with the stolen objects ends up with a fight and being transported to the police station. There, Dorothy Masłowska plays a person, who transcribes testimony of „Strong”. The whole film takes place in her mind and she is able to influence the course of events at will. After leaving the police station, stunned "Strong" hits his head against the wall and loses consciousness. Magda turns up at the hospital, but "Strong" dies. After death he goes to hell, which turns out to be a television studio in which he is the guest of the talk show, where viewers expect emotions and savory details.

== Cast ==
- Borys Szyc as Andrew Robakowski ("Strong")
- Roma Gąsiorowska as Magda, the girl dating "Strong"
- Sonia Bohosiewicz as Natasha Blokus
- Maria Strzelecka as Angela
- Anna Prussia as Ala
- Bartłomiej Firlet as Kacper
- Michał Czernecki as "Left"
- Magdalena Czerwińska as Arleta, a colleague of Magda
- Ewa Kasprzyk as "Strong's" mother
- Ireneusz Kozioł as "Strong's" father
- Piotr "Vienio" Więcławski as a "Strong's" brother
- Dorota Masłowska as Dorothy Masłowska
- Xawery Żuławski

== Production ==
The film was shot between May 6 and 18 June 2008 in locations of Warsaw, Wejherowo, Sopot and Gdynia outskirts. The film premiered on May 22, 2009.

The budget of Polish-Russian War amounted to approx. 4 million zlotys.

== Soundtrack ==
The creators of the music for the film are Jan Komar, Filip Kuncewicz, Liroy, Mateusz Łapot and Jarosław Karczmarczyk.

The soundtrack also included the following songs:

- Scarlet by Closterkeller (music: Paweł Pieczyński, lyrics: Anna Najman)
- Blondynka by Focus (music and lyrics: Zbigniew Perkowski)
- Nóżki by Focus
- List do M by Dżem (music: Benedykt Otręba, lyrics: Ryszard Riedel, Dorota Zawiesienko)
- Soldat by 5'nizza (music and lyrics: Sergiej Babkin, Andriej Zaporożec)
- Martwię się by Molesta Ewenement, featuring Ero i Pablopavo
- Wariatka z miasta Wariatkowa by Liroy (muzyka: Mateusz Łapot, lyrics: Liroy)
