= Letters to Santa 5 =

- Poster
- Directed by: Łukasz Jaworski
- Written by: Marcin Baczyński; Mariusz Kuczewski
- Produced by: Tomasz Blachnicki
- Starring: Tomasz Karolak; Piotr Adamczyk; Agnieszka Dygant; Wojciech Malajkat; Maria Dębska; Jan Peszek
- Cinematography: Marian Prokop
- Edited by: Jarosław Barzan
- Music by: Łukasz Targosz
- Production company: TVN
- Distributed by: Kino Świat
- Release date: 4 November 2022
- Running time: 108 minutes
- Country: Poland
- Language: Polish

Letters to Santa 5 (Polish: Listy do M. 5) is a 2022 Polish-language romantic comedy directed by Łukasz Jaworski, and written by Marcin Baczyński and Mariusz Kuczewski. It is the fifth installment following the events of the 2011 film Letters to Santa by Mitja Okorn. The action takes place in Warsaw, Poland, during a Christmas Eve, and follows the lives of characters from the first film, focusing on various aspects of love as shown through separate stories involving a wide variety of individuals, many of whom are shown to be interlinked as the tales progress. As in the first film, its plot refers to the 2003 romantic comedy Love Actually, though the events differ in those films. The film was produced by TVN and distributed by Kino Świat. It premiered on 4 November 2022. The film was followed by Letters to Santa 6 in 2024.

== Cast ==
- Tomasz Karolak as Melchior "Mel Gibson"
- Piotr Adamczyk as Szczepan Lisiecki
- Agnieszka Dygant as Karina Lisiecka
- Wojciech Malajkat as Wojciech Kamiński
- Janusz Chabior as Lucek
- Maria Dębska as Majka
- Aleksandra Popławska as Anna
- Mateusz Banasiuk as Przemek
- Bartłomiej Kotschedoff as Damian
- Marianna Zydek as Lena
- Jan Peszek as uncle Maurycy
- Kosma Press as Pawełek

== Production ==
The film was directed by Łukasz Jaworski, written by Marcin Baczyński and Mariusz Kuczewski, and produced by Tomasz Blachnicki. The editing was done by Jarosław Barzan, cinematography by Marian Prokop, music by Łukasz Targosz, scenography by Wojciech Żogała, and costiumes by Katarzyna Baran. It was filmed in Warsaw, Poland, in 2020, and produced by TVN. The main cast included Tomasz Karolak, Piotr Adamczyk, Agnieszka Dygant, Wojciech Malajkat, Maria Dębska, and Jan Peszek. The film premiered on 4 November 2022.
