= Patrick Yoka =

Television and film director

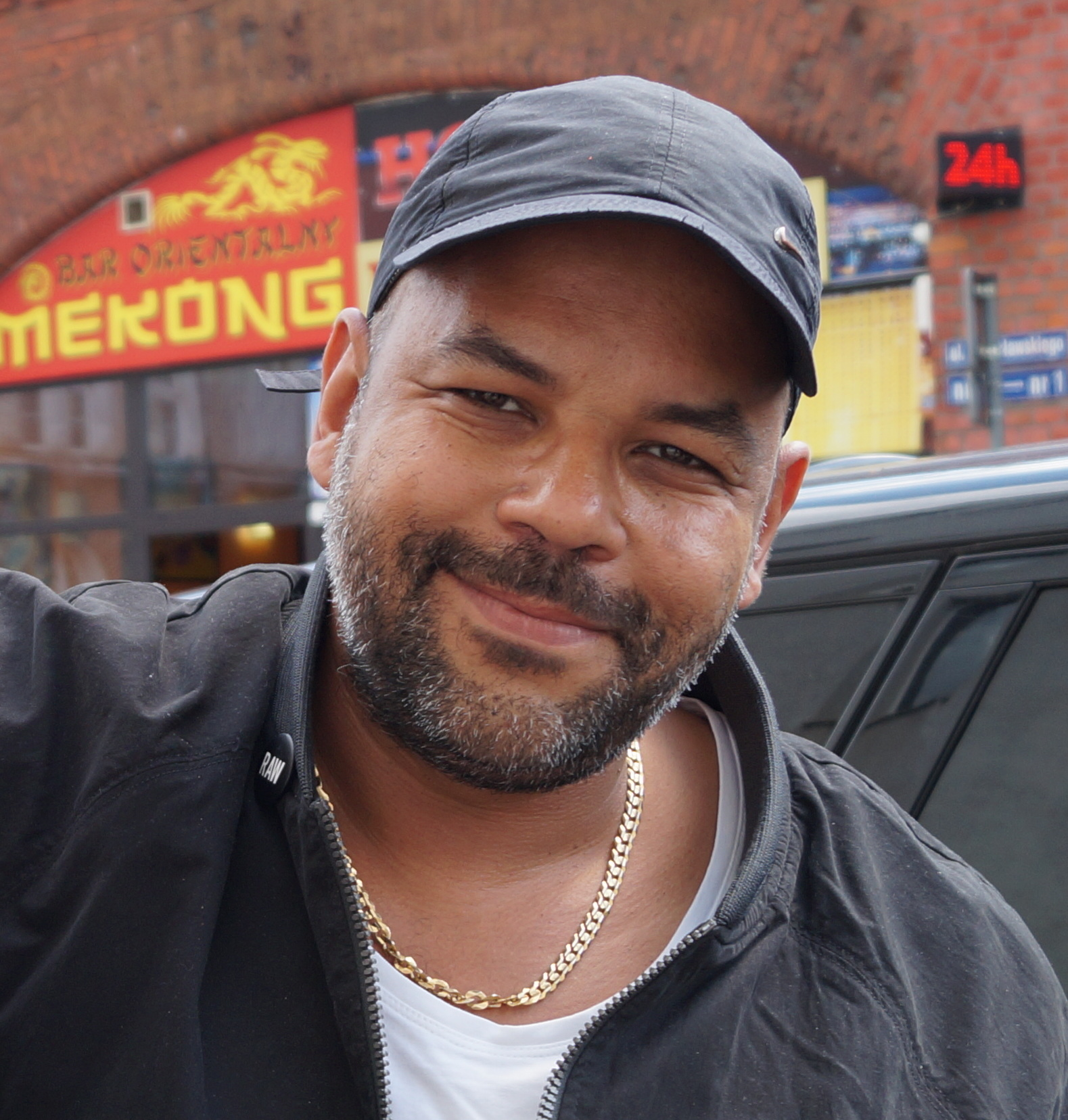
- Patrick Yoka in 2016.
- Born: 1975 (age 50–51)
- Occupations: Television and film director and screenwriter
- Years active: 2000–present

Patrick Yoka (born 1975) is a Polish television and film director and screenwriter. He is best known for his work on television series The Lousy World (2000–2017), Niania (2006–2007), Family.pl (2011–2020, 2025), and True Law (2012).

== Biography ==
Patrick Yoka graduated from the Karol Szymanowski Music School in Wrocław, Poland.

In 2000, he began working as a screenwriter on the television series The Lousy World, and in 2008, he also became director of the series. He worked on the series until 2017. He also worked as a screenwriter on the television series Crime Wave (2003–2004), Hela w opałach (2006), and Niania (2006–2007), as well as a director on television series Hela w opałach (2006), and Naznaczony (2009), and True Law (2012). In 2011, he began working as a director on the television series Family.pl, and in 2016, he also begun working there as a screenwriter. He worked on the show until 2020, and again in 2025, following its revival. He directed feature films Letters to Santa 4 (2020), and Święta inaczej (2022).

== Private life ==
He is in a relationship with actress Agnieszka Dygant, with whom he has a son born in 2010.

== Filmography ==
Year	Title	Position	Notes	Ref.
2000–2017	The Lousy World	Screenwriter	TV series; 341 episodes	
2008–2017	The Lousy World	Director	TV series; 246 episodes	
2002	Awantura o kasę	Screenwriter	Game show	
2003–2004	Crime Wave	Screenwriter	TV series; 14 episodes	
2006	Hela w opałach	Screenwriter	TV series; 3 episodes	
2006	Hela w opałach	Director	TV series; 15 episodes	
2006	Kim Ki Dok	Director and screenwriter	Documentary film	
2006–2007	Niania	Screenwriter	TV series; 10 episodes	
2007	Droga krzyżowa	Director and screenwriter	Documentary TV series; 2 episodes	
2009	Naznaczony	Director	TV series; 3 episodes	
2010	Zmartwychwstania miało nie być	Screenwriter	Documentary film	
2011–2020, 2025	Family.pl	Director	TV series	
2016–2020, 2025	Family.pl	Screenwriter	TV series	
2012	True Law	Director	TV series; 5 episodes	
2015–2016	Powiedz tak!	Director	TV series; 12 episodes	
2020	Letters to Santa 4	Director	Feature film	
2022	Święta inaczej	Director	Feature film	
