= Maciej Zakościelny =

Polish actor

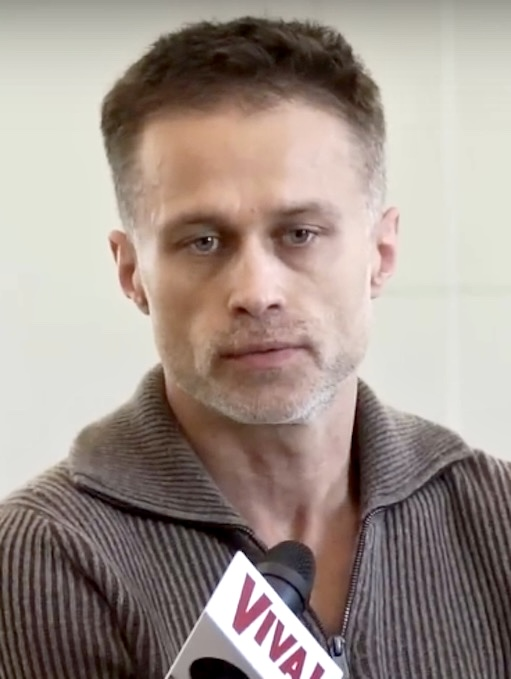
- Maciej Zakościelny, 2024
- Born: 7 May 1980 (age 45); Stalowa Wola, Poland
- Occupation: Actor
- Years active: 2001–present

Maciej Gracjan Zakościelny (born 7 May 1980) is a Polish film, television and theatre actor.

== Life and career ==
He was born on 7 May 1980 in Stalowa Wola. In 2004, he began his studies at the National Academy of Dramatic Art in Warsaw but didn't complete them. He began his acting career by appearing on TV series such as Plebania, Sfora, Na Jelenia, Samo życie and Na dobre i na złe. He played his first major film role in Jerzy Hoffman's 2003 film An Ancient Tale: When the Sun Was a God. In 2004, he started performing at the Współczesny Theatre in Warsaw and joined the cast of the popular TV crime drama Kryminalni playing the character of Marek Brodecki. He appeared in Ryszard Zatorski's 2005 romantic comedy Tylko mnie kochaj (Just Love Me). Between 2008 and 2014, he starred in the historical television series Czas honoru playing the role of Bronek Woyciechowski, one of the Silent Unseens. Between 2017 and 2019, he played a role in the Diagnoza (Diagnosis) TV show, which earned him a nomination for the Telekamera Award for Best Actor.

== Personal life ==
He received an education in music and plays the violin. In 2009, he performed at the Jazz Jamboree Festival alongside singer Marianna Wróblewska and jazz pianist Beata Przybytek.

Since 2014, he has been in a relationship with model Paulina Wyka with whom he has two sons.

== Filmography ==
=== Film ===
Year	Title	Role	Notes
2002	Na jelenie	Emil	
2003	Stara baśń. Kiedy słońce było bogiem	Wramot	
2005	Solidarność, Solidarność...	Janek	
2006	Just Love Me	Michał	
2007	Dlaczego nie!	Jan	
2007	Nightwatching	Egremont	
2008	And a wamr heart (Serce na dłoni)	Assistant Konstanty	
2015	Letters to Santa 2	Robert "Redo" Bartosiewicz	
2016	7 rzeczy, których nie wiecie o facetach	Kordian Bachleda-Mostowicz	
2016	Po prostu przyjaźń	Grzesiek	
2018	303 Squadron (film)	Jan "Donald" Zumbach	
2019	I'll Find You	Łukasz	
2019	1800 gramów	patron Paweł Raszyński	
2019	Miszmasz, czyli kogel-mogel 3	Piotr Wolański	
2020	Jak zostać gwiazdą?	singer Olo Zawistowski, father "Ostrej"	
2021	Koniec świata, czyli kogel-mogel 4	Piotr Wolański	

=== Television ===
Year	Title	Role	Notes
2001–2002	Plebania	Marek Bednarek	
2002–2004	Na dobre i na złe	Igor Kurowski	
2002	Samo życie	Antoni Knapik	
2002	Sfora	Paweł Lipski	
2002	Sfora: Bez litości	Paweł Lipski	
2004	An Ancient Tale: When the Sun Was a God	Wramot	
2004–2008	Crime Detectives	assistant commissioner Marek Brodecki	
2008–2014	Days of Honor	Bronek Wojciechowski	
2012	Reguły gry	Adam Morawski, Natasza's fiancé	
2012	True Law	Konrad Nałęcz	ep. 24
2015–2016	Strażacy	aspirant Adam Wojnar	
2017–2019	Diagnosis	dr Michał Wolski	
2020	Rysa	Piotr Wasilewski, Monika's partner	

=== TV Theater ===
- 2002: Sesja Kastingowa
- 2004: Książę nocy – Marek
- 2007: Pierwszy września – Eugeniusz
- 2007: Rodzinne show – Dusty
- 2010: Operacja Reszka – Kazimierz
- 2010: Komedia romantyczna – Marcin Ciamciara
- 2011: Getsemani – Geoff Benzine
- 2017: Marszałek – adjutant Piłsudski

=== Theater ===
Teatr Scena Prezentacje (Warsaw)

- 2004: Czas odnaleziony – Morel

Teatr Współczesny (Warsaw)

- 2005: Porucznik z Inishmore – Joey
- 2006: Udając ofiarę – Wierchuszkin
- 2008: To idzie młodość – Kandydat na...

Scena na Woli im. Tadeusza Łomnickiego (Warsaw)

- 2011: Amazonia – Krzysztof

=== Dubbing in Polish ===
- 2000: Bob Budowniczy i niezapomniane święta - Bożego Narodzenia
- 2003: Cheaper by the Dozen (Fałszywa dwunastka) – Charlie Baker
- 2004: Harry Potter and the Prisoner of Azkaban (Harry Potter i więzień Azkabanu) – Stan Shunpike
- 2006: 6teen (6 w pracy) – Jonesy
- 2006: Eragon – Eragon
- 2006: Shark Bait (Sposób na rekina) – Pi (Pyś)
- 2008: Prince of Persia (videogame) – Prince
- 2016: Fantastic Beasts and Where to Find Them (Fantastyczne zwierzęta i jak je znaleźć) – Newt Scamander

== See also ==
- Polish cinema
- Polish Film Awards
