= List of True Law episodes =

True Law is a Polish legal drama television series airing on TVN. It premiered on 4 March 2012 at 8:00 p.m. with two back-to-back episodes.

== Series overview ==
Series	Episodes	Originally released	
Series	Episodes	First released	Last released
1	15	4 March 2012	3 June 2012
2	13	4 September 2012	27 November 2012

== Episode list ==
=== Series 1: Spring 2012 ===
No. overall	No. in series	Title	Directed by	Written by	Original release date	Viewers (millions)
1	1	"Episode 1"	Maciej Migas	Kaja Krawczyk, Karolina Frankowska, Aneta Głowska, Piotr Subbotko	4 March 2012	2.95
2	2	"Episode 2"	Maciej Migas	Krawczyk, Frankowska, Głowska, Subbotko	4 March 2012	3.55
3	3	"Episode 3"	Maciej Migas	Krawczyk, Frankowska, Głowska, Subbotko	11 March 2012	2.90
4	4	"Episode 4"	Maciej Migas	Krawczyk, Frankowska, Głowska, Subbotko	18 March 2012	2.88
5	5	"Episode 5"	Maciej Migas	Piotr Szymanek, Frankowska, Głowska, Marek Kreutz	25 March 2012	3.04
6	6	"Episode 6"	Maciej Migas	Kaja Krawczyk	1 April 2012	3.26
7	7	"Episode 7"	Maciej Migas	Piotr Szymanek	8 April 2012	2.81
8	8	"Episode 8"	Maciej Migas	Kaja Krawczyk	15 April 2012	2.98
9	9	"Episode 9"	Maciej Migas	Kaja Krawczyk	22 April 2012	3.14
10	10	"Episode 10"	Maciej Migas	Piotr Szymanek	29 April 2012	2.94
11	11	"Episode 11"	Patrick Yoka	Piotr Szymanek	6 May 2012	2.82
12	12	"Episode 12"	Patrick Yoka	Kaja Krawczyk	13 May 2012	2.96
13	13	"Episode 13"	Patrick Yoka	Piotr Szymanek	20 May 2012	2.94
14	14	"Episode 14"	Patrick Yoka	Kaja Krawczyk	27 May 2012	2.52
15	15	"Episode 15"	Patrick Yoka	Kaja Krawczyk	3 June 2012	3.16

=== Series 2 ===
No. overall	No. in series	Title	Original release date
16	1	TBA	4 September 2012
17	2	TBA	TBA
18	3	TBA	TBA
19	4	TBA	TBA
20	5	TBA	TBA
21	6	TBA	TBA
22	7	TBA	TBA
23	8	TBA	TBA
24	9	TBA	TBA
25	10	TBA	TBA
26	11	TBA	TBA
27	12	TBA	TBA
28	13	TBA	27 November 2012
