= List of Medics (Polish TV series) episodes =

Medics, also known under the original title Lekarze, is a Polish medical drama which aired from 3 September 2012 to 30 November 2014 on TVN.

== Episodes ==
=== Season 1 (2012) ===
No. overall	No. in series	Title Translated English Title	Directed by	Written by	Original release date	Viewers
1	1	"Na rozdrożu" "At The Crossroads"	Filip Zylber	Justyna Stefaniak	3 September 2012	2 938 596
2	2	"Nowe rozdanie" "A New Hand"	Filip Zylber	Justyna Stefaniak	10 September 2012	2 941 563
3	3	"Nic mie jest takie, jakim się wydaje" "Nothing Is Like It Seems To Be"	Filip Zylber	Andrzej Staszczyk	17 September 2012	3 148 417
4	4	"Niektórzy nazywają to miłością" "Some Call It Love"	Filip Zylber	Andrzej Staszczyk	24 September 2012	2 710 812
5	5	"Jedno zdecydowane cięcie" "One Definite Cut"	Filip Zylber	Andrzej Staszczyk	1 October 2012	3 011 753
6	6	"Ziarnko prawdy" "A Seed of Truth"	Filip Zylber	Andrzej Staszczyk	8 October 2012	3 175 740
7	7	"Kłamstwo ma wiele twarzy" "Lie Has Many Faces"	Filip Zylber	Marek Kreutz	15 October 2012	3 137 821
8	8	"W ostatniej chwili" "At The Last Moment"	Filip Zylber	Marek Kreutz	22 October 2012	3 089 764
9	9	"Brak komunikacji" "Lack of Communication"	Filip Zylber	Marek Kreutz	29 October 2012	2 771 485
10	10	"Nie każdy ma drugą szansę" "Not Everybody Gets a Second Chance"	Filip Zylber	Andrzej Staszczyk	5 November 2012	3 005 225
11	11	"Trudne wybory" "Hard Choices"	Marcin Wrona	Justyna Stefaniak	12 November 2012	3 124 023
12	12	"Granice poświęcenia" "Limits of Sacrifice"	Marcin Wrona	Justyna Stefaniak	19 November 2012	3 151 198
13	13	"Zacząć na nowo" "Starting Over"	Marcin Wrona	Andrzej Staszczyk	26 November 2012	3 473 527

=== Season 2 (2013) ===
No. overall	No. in series	Title Translated English Title	Directed by	Written by	Original release date	Viewers
14	1	"Gdyby można było cofnąć czas" "If You Could Turn Back Time"	Marcin Wrona	Justyna Stefaniak	25 February 2013	2 899 478
15	2	"I żyli długo i szczęśliwie...?" "Happily Ever After...?"	Marcin Wrona	Andrzej Staszczyk	4 March 2013	2 672 514
16	3	"Więzy krwi" "Blood Ties"	Filip Zylber	Justyna Stefaniak	11 March 2013	3 022 336
17	4	"Druga strona medalu" "The Other Side of the Coin"	Filip Zylber	Andrzej Staszczyk	18 March 2013	3 160 120
18	5	"Lekarstwo na miłość" "Medicine For Love"	Filip Zylber	Justyna Stefaniak	25 March 2013	2 798 120
19	6	"Ostatni pierwszymi" "The Last Shall Be First"	Filip Zylber	Andrzej Staszczyk	8 April 2013	2 534 392
20	7	"Błogosławieni cierpliwi" "Blessed Are The Patient"	Filip Zylber	Andrzej Staszczyk	15 April 2013	2 721 621
21	8	"Druga szansa" "Second Chance"	Filip Zylber	Andrzej Staszczyk	22 April 2013	2 662 674
22	9	"Mylne tropy" "A Red Herring"	Filip Zylber	Justyna Stefaniak	29 April 2013	2 546 282
23	10	"Sytuacje podbramkowe" "Tight Spots"	Marcin Wrona	Marek Kreutz	6 May 2013	2 651 173
24	11	"Co z oczu to nie z serca" "Out of Sight But Not Out of Heart"	Marcin Wrona	Marek Kreutz	13 May 2013	2 814 752
25	12	"Powrót" "The Return"	Marcin Wrona	Marek Kreutz & Andrzej Staszczyk	20 May 2013	2 844 714
26	13	"Gruba kreska" "The Thick Line"	Marcin Wrona	Andrzej Staszczyk	27 May 2013	2 810 814
