= Małgorzata Socha =

Polish actress (born 1980)

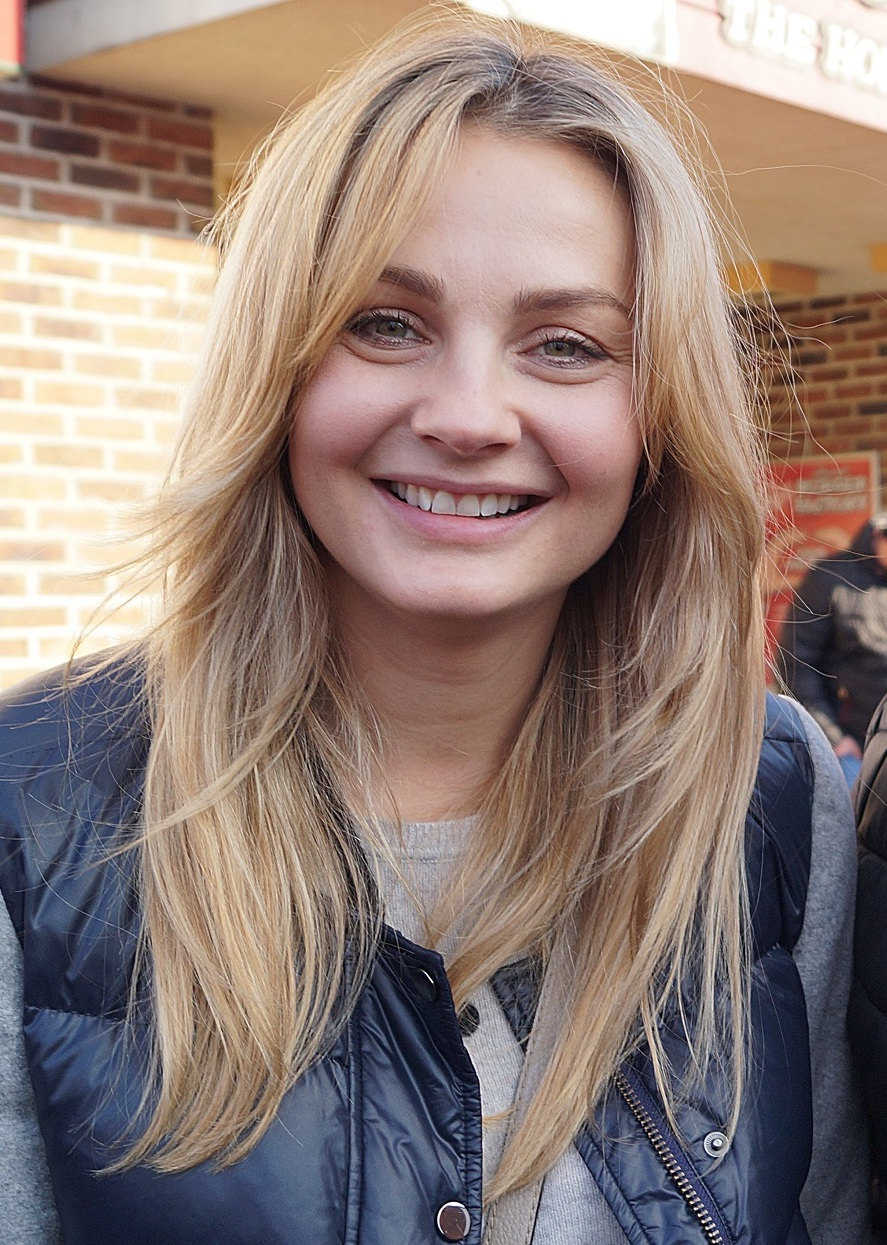
- Małgorzata Socha, 2019
- Born: Małgorzata Socha; 23 April 1980 (age 45); Warsaw, Poland
- Occupation: Actress
- Years active: 1997–present
- Spouse: Krzysztof Wiśniewski (m. 2008)
- Children: 3

Małgorzata Socha (born 23 April 1980) is a Polish actress. Mostly known from TV series BrzydUla, Na Wspólnej and Przyjaciółki.

== Personal life ==
She was born in Warsaw, Poland. In 2003, she graduated from The Aleksander Zelwerowicz National Academy of Dramatic Art in Warsaw. On 5 July 2008 she married Krzysztof Wiśniewski. On 11 August 2014 she gave birth to their daughter, named Zofia. On 20 January 2017 she gave birth to her second daughter, named Barbara. On 4 September 2018 she gave birth to her third child, a son named Stanisław.

== Filmography ==
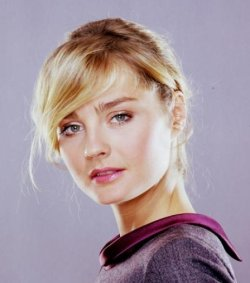
Małgorzata Socha, 2008

Year	Title	Role	Notes
2005	Po sezonie	Dasia	
2005	Lawstorant	Jola	
2006	Miłość w przejściu podziemnym	Kaśka	
2006	S@motność w sieci		
2010	Śniadanie do łóżka	Marta Biała	
2010	Weekend	Maja	
2011	Och, Karol 2	Maria	
2012	Być jak Kazimierz Deyna	teacher	
2012	The Snow Queen	Alfida	
2014	Wkręceni 2	Klementyna	
2019	Jak poslubic milionera	Alicja	
