= Wojciech Malajkat =

Polish actor

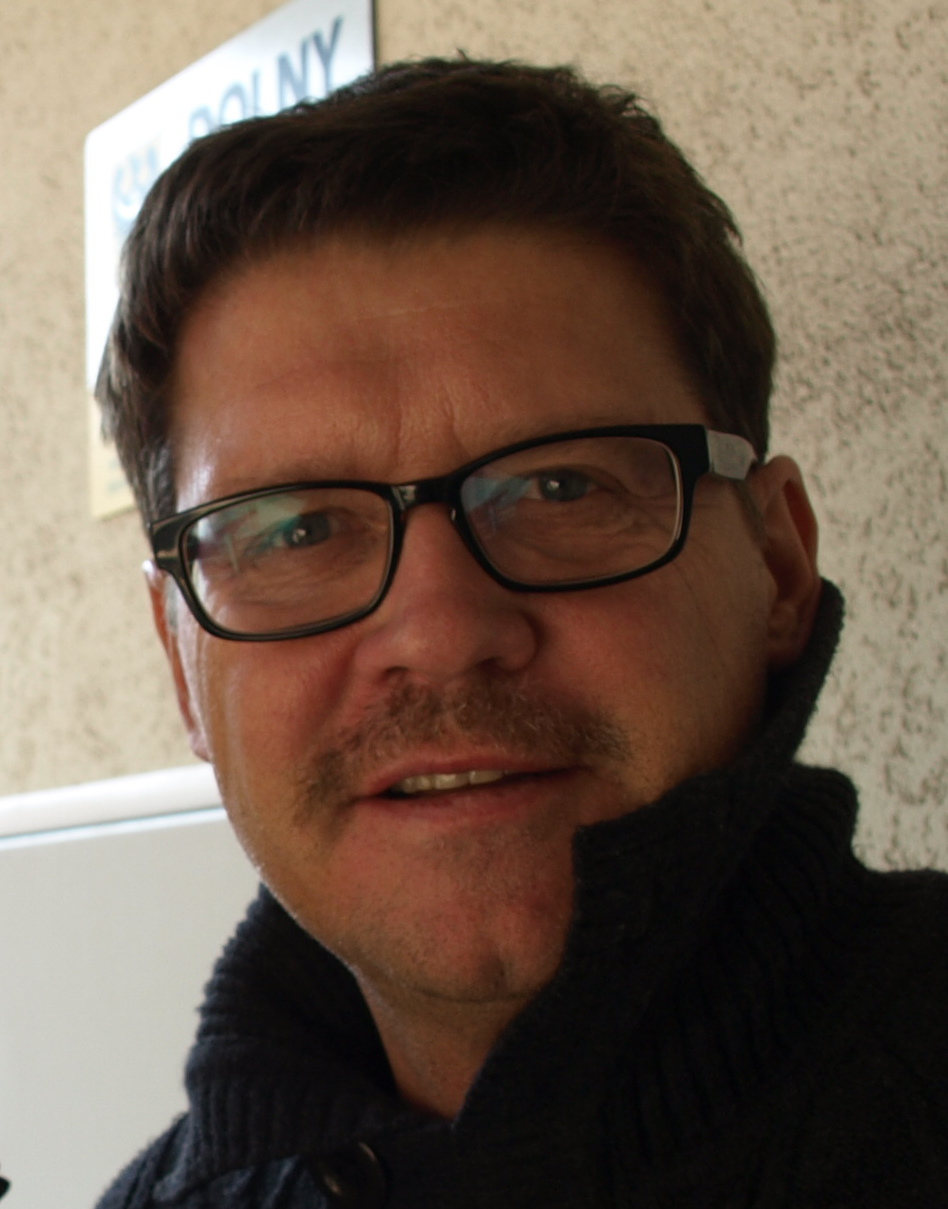
- Wojciech Malajkat in 2013
- Born: 16 January 1963 (age 63); Mrągowo Poland
- Education: National Film School in Łódź
- Occupations: Actor and theatre director

Wojciech Karol Malajkat, born January 16, 1963 in Mrągowo, Poland, is a Polish theater and film actor, television presenter, director, teacher, and former rector of the Aleksander Zelwerowicz National Academy of Dramatic Art, serving two terms of office between 2016–2020 and 2020–2024.

== Life and career ==
In 1986 he graduated from the Polish National Film, Television and Theatre School in Łódź. Since 1986 he has performed at the Studio Theatre and the National Theatre in Warsaw. He has performed as a guest at the Scena Prezentacje Theatre in Warsaw.

In the years 2009–2017 artistic director of the Syrena Theater in Warsaw, and also in the years 2009–2014 managing director of this stage. Since 2024 general director of the Contemporary Theater in Warsaw.

== Filmography ==
=== Actor ===
Polish title	Year	Role
Żuraw i czapla	1985	Kasia's friend
Pogrzeb lwa	1986	Henryk
Czarne Stopy	1986	Scout Leader Andrzej Wróbel
ESD	1986	Krzysztof
O rany, nic się nie stało!!!	1987	Jacek Bukała
Zad wielkiego wieloryba	1987	Robert
Cesarskie cięcie	1987	Marek Sykut
Serenite	1988	young Witold
Sztuka kochania	1989	actor in theater
Stan strachu	1989	actor Jan Małecki
Odbicia	1989	Tomek (ep. 3-5)
Deja vu	1989	German cyclist
Mów mi Rockefeller	1990	Ludwik Prajski
Zabić na końcu	1990	Szwagrowski
Panny i wdowy (series)	1991	Herbert (ep. 4-5)
Panny i wdowy	1991	Herbert
VIP	1991	Roman Natorski
Piękna nieznajoma	1992	Nikita Andreicz Obozow
Łowca. Ostatnie starcie	1993	Janik's father
Pajęczarki	1993	Andrzej
Czterdziestolatek 20 lat później	1993	Marek Karwowski
WOW	1993	Mat Kely
Bank nie z tej ziemi	1994	Godek Nieśmiałkowski (ep. 13)
Wielki tydzień	1995	Jan Małecki
Szabla od komendanta	1995	Janeczek
Próby domowe	1995	
Bar Atlantic	1996	Mileniusz Skorek
Policjanci	1999	assistant (ep. 10)
Ogniem i mieczem	1999	Rzędzian
Lot 001	1999	barman Leon
Na dobre i na złe	2000	paratrooper (ep. 49)
Ogniem i mieczem (series)	2000	Rzędzian
Klasa na obcasach	2000	Klemens
13 posterunek 2	2000	actor (ep. 31)
Бандитский Петербург 2	2000	Marek Zieliński
Bao-Bab, czyli zielono mi	2003	cook Józef Wypchło (ep. 6)
Królowa chmur	2003	Piotr
Nienasycenie	2003	colonel Michał Węborek
Defekt	2003	chief Wojciechowski
Sprawa na dziś	2003–2005	teacher Jabłonowski
Pensjonat pod Różą	2004	Wiesław Rosa (ep. 34)
Codzienna 2 m. 3	2005–2007	Piotr Gawlik
Szatan z siódmej klasy	2006	professor Gąsowski
Szatan z siódmej klasy (series)	2006	professor Gąsowski
Miłość w przejściu podziemnym	2006	Bogdan „Mozart”
Optymista	2010	Teodor Twardowski
Nowa	2010	Kuźniar (ep. 13)
Listy do M.	2011	Wojciech
Prawo Agaty	2014	Paweł Fabiański
Obywatel	2014	Lipski
Listy do M. 2	2015	Wojciech Kamiński
Listy do M. 3	2017	Wojciech Kamiński
Listy do M. 4	2020	Wojciech Kamiński
Listy do M. 5	2022	Wojciech Kamiński
Sami swoi. Początek	2024	priest

=== Polish dubbing ===
- 1990: Armelle – Piotr
- 1992–1995: The World of Peter Rabbit and Friends
- 1996: In Love and War (1996 film) – De Cart
- 1996: 101 Dalmatians (1996 film) – Roger Perry
- 2002: Tytus, Romek i A’Tomek wśród złodziei marzeń – Romek
- 2002: Ice Age (2002 film) – Maniek
- 2004: Shrek 2 – Puss in Boots
- 2004: Shrek 2 (video game) – Puss in Boots
- 2004: Around the World in 80 Days (2004 film) – Wilbur Wright
- 2005: Herbie: Fully Loaded – Trip Murphy
- 2005: Pope John Paul II (miniseries)
- 2005: Kronk's New Groove
- 2006: Happily N'Ever After – Rick
- 2006: Ice Age: The Meltdown – Manny
- 2006: Wielka wędrówka
- 2007: Shrek the Halls – Puss in Boots
- 2007: Shrek the Third – Puss in Boots
- 2008: Dolphins and Whales 3D: Tribes of the Ocean – narrator
- 2008: Wino truskawkowe – Andrzej
- 2008: Zupełnie inna historia – Knife
- 2008–2009: Pucuł i Grzechu – Grzechu
- 2009: Ice Age: Dawn of the Dinosaurs – Manny
- 2010: Scared Shrekless – Puss
- 2010: Shrek Forever After – Puss in Boots
- 2010: Dwa kroki za...
- 2011: Puss in Boots (2011 film) – Puss in Boots
- 2011: Ice Age: A Mammoth Christmas – Manny
- 2011: Ratchet & Clank: all 4 one – Ratchet
- 2012: Ratchet & Clank – Ratchet
- 2012: PlayStation All-Stars Battle Royale – Ratchet
- 2012: Ice Age: Continental Drift – Manny
- 2016: Ice Age: Collision Course – Manny
- 2017: Cars 3 – Sterling
- 2018: Mary Poppins Returns – William Wilkins
- 2022: Puss in Boots: The Last Wish – Puss in Boots

=== Director ===
Rok	Nazwa	Performed
2007	Wolny jeździec	movie
2007	Chłopiec z gwiazd	Teatr Dzieci Zagłębia in Będzin
2007	Hipnoza	Bajka Theater in Warsaw
2008	Pajęcza sieć	Syrena Theater in Warsaw
2015	Plotka	Aleksander Sewruk Theater in Elbląg
2019	Wstyd	Współczesny Theater in Warsaw
2021	Inteligenci	Spektaklove
2023	Prawda	Garnizon Sztuki
