= A Beautiful Stranger =

- Piękna nieznajoma
- Directed by: Jerzy Hoffman
- Screenplay by: Jerzy Hoffman; Vladimir Zheleznikov
- Based on: Retribution by Aleksey Tolstoy
- Produced by: Jerzy Hoffman
- Starring: Grażyna Szapołowska; Wojciech Malajkat
- Edited by: Krzysztof Osiecki
- Release date: 1992
- Running time: 90 minutes
- Country: Poland
- Language: Polish

A Beautiful Stranger is the English title of the Polish film Piękna nieznajoma, directed by Jerzy Hoffman, released in 1992. It is based on a story by Aleksey Nikolayevich Tolstoy.

== Synopsis ==
In 1916 a young Russian officer is asked to transport important documents by train. Several factions pursue the papers.

== Cast ==
- Grażyna Szapołowska as Lyudmila
- Wojciech Malajkat as Nikita Andreyevich Obozov
- Beata Tyszkiewicz as the Dame
- Nikita Mikhalkov as the Colonel
- Ivan Krasko as Grigori Rasputin
- Igor Dmitriev as retired officer, anecdote teller
- Mikhail Kononov as merchant
- Albert Filozov as the Englishman
- Natalya Arinbasarova as Miss Suzuki
- Vladimir Yeryomin as officer
- Oleg Pogudin as officer
- Edward Żentara as the chief spy
- Viktor Bychkov as waiter
- Yuri Galtsev as the newlywed
