= Rezerwat =

- Directed by: Łukasz Palkowski
- Written by: Marcin Kwaśny; Łukasz Palkowski
- Starring: Marcin Kwaśny; Sonia Bohosiewicz; Łukasz Palkowski
- Cinematography: Paweł Sobczyk
- Edited by: Paweł Witecki
- Release dates: 17 September 2007 (Gdynia Polish Film Festival); 11 January 2008 (Poland)
- Running time: 120 minutes
- Country: Poland
- Language: Polish

Rezerwat is a 2007 Polish film. It is director Łukasz Palkowski's first film.

== Plot ==
The story is set in a poor neighborhood in Warsaw and concerns a pickpocket and a photographer.

== Reception ==
Rezerwat does not yet have a rating from Rotten Tomatoes.

In the United States, the film is only available in a region-free DVD with English subtitles.

== Cast ==
- Marcin Kwaśny - Marcin
- Sonia Bohosiewicz – Hanka,
- Grzegorz Palkowski – Grześ
- Artur Dziurman – Roman
- Tomasz Karolak – Rysiek
- Krzysztof Janczar
- Mariusz Drężek – Marek,
- Bożena Adamek – Grzesia
- Mikołaj Müller
- Jan Stawarz
- Violetta Arlak - Krysia
- Ryszard Chlebuś
- Waldemar Czyszak
- Danuta Borsuk

== Awards ==
At the Polish Film Festival, the director, editor, and supporting actress (Sonia Bohosiewicz) all won in their respective categories; additionally, Palkowski won the Critics' Award.
