= Marian Prokop =

Polish cinematographer (born 1967)

- Born: 22 August 1967 (age 58); Warsaw
- Citizenship: Poland
- Occupation: Cinematographer

Marian Prokop (born 22 August 1967) is a cinematographer.

In 1993 he graduated from the Cinematography Faculty of the Łódź Film School. He became a member of the Polish Film Academy.

== Filmography ==
- Bastard (1997)
- Kochaj i rób co chcesz (1997)
- Stacja (2001)
- Powiedz to, Gabi (2003)
- Ja wam pokażę! (2006)
- Ryś (2007)
- Polish-Russian War (2009)
- Letters to Santa (2011)
- Warsaw 44 (2014)
- Letters to Santa 2 (2015)
- Polish Legends (2015)
- Letters to Santa 3 (2017)
- My Name Is Sara (2019)
- Mowa ptaków (2019)
- Letters to Santa 4 (2021)
- Letters to Santa 5 (2022)
- The Behaviorist (2022), TV series
- Apokawixa (2022)
- The Thaw (2023), TV series
- Pati (2023), TV series
- Letters to Santa 6 (2024)
- Miłość jak miód (2024)
- Kulej. Dwie strony medalu (2024)
- Langer (2025), TV series

== Accolades ==
He earned three Polish Academy Award for Best Cinematography nominations: for Polish-Russian War, Warsaw 44 and Mowa ptaków.
