= Weekend (2010 film) =

2011 film directed by Cezary Pazura

- Directed by: Cezary Pazura
- Written by: Lesław Kaźmierczak
- Screenplay by: Monika Sajko
- Produced by: Cezar 10 Sp. z o.o.
- Starring: Paweł Małaszyński; Małgorzata Socha; Michał Lewandowski; Paweł Wilczak
- Cinematography: Grzegorz Kuczeriszka
- Music by: Filip Siejka
- Production company: Big Blue TV
- Distributed by: ITI Cinema
- Release date: 2010
- Running time: 115mins
- Country: Poland
- Language: Polish

Weekend is a 2010 Polish crime comedy film directed by Cezary Pazura, his directorial debut.

The plot revolves around two gangsters who are struggling for control of the city, who decide to track down and get hold of a suitcase filled with money and drugs. Meanwhile, another criminal gang has the same goal.

The film was shot and set in Łódź and released in the cinemas.

Critical reception was mostly negative, accused of being vulgar and low-brow.

== Cast ==
- Paweł Małaszyński – Max
- Małgorzata Socha
- Michał Lewandowski – „Gula”
- Jan Frycz
- Paweł Wilczak – Norman
- Piotr Miazga – Cygan
- Antoni Królikowski – Malinowski
- Radosław Pazura – Borys
- Tomasz Tyndyk – Johny
- Anna Karczmarczyk – „Młoda"
- Olaf Lubaszenko – Czeski
- Tomasz Sapryk – Szasza
- Adrianna Biedrzyńska
- Piotr Siejka
- Filip Bobek – playboy
- Ryszard Dreger – man I
- Mirosław Kropielnicki
- Andrzej Andrzejewski – Stefan
- Krzysztof Pyziak – Cygan II
- Grzegorz Stelmaszewski – Cygan III
- Robert Martyniak – Cygan IV
- Waldemar Wilkołek – Łysy
- Bartłomiej Myca
- Krzysztof Mika
- Grzegorz Jurek
- Robert Brzeziński
- Kornelina Dzikowska
- Alicja Szopińska
- Jan Krzysztof Szczygieł
- Sławomir Sulej
- Michał Wójcik – Chemik
- Michał Szewczyk
- Agnieszka Jaskółka
- Amelia Radecka
- Norbert Kaczorowski
- Paweł Domagała
- Błażej Pieczonka
- Mariusz Pilawski
- Magdalena Jaworska
- Marek Nędza
- Sławomir Małyszko – Bin Laden
- Paweł Pilszka
- Jacek Długosz
- Tomasz Krzeminecki
- Tomasz Krzyżanowski
- Stefan Wójcicki
- Krzysztof Sztabiński
- Piotr Dziarski
