= Crime Detectives =

Polish television series

- Polish: Kryminalni
- Genre: Crime thriller; Mystery; Teen drama
- Created by: Piotr Wereśniak
- Starring: Marek Włodarczyk; Maciej Zakościelny; Magdalena Schejbal
- Country of origin: Poland
- No. of seasons: 8
- No. of episodes: 101

Production
- Running time: Approximate 42 minutes (60 including commercials)

Original release
- Network: TVN
- Release: 2004 – 2008

Crime Detectives (Polish: Kryminalni) was a Polish crime drama television series that aired on TVN network from 18 September 2004 until 24 May 2008. It ran for 8 seasons and 101 episodes were broadcast in total. It was created by Polish director and screenwriter Piotr Wereśniak and produced by MTL Maxfilm studio.

The series followed life and work of police officers from the elite Criminal Terror and Murders Division of the Warsaw Metropolitan Police; the title refers to police officers in the crime section. The three main characters were Adam Zawada, an experienced, tough cop, his younger colleague Marek Brodecki and Barbara (Basia) Storosz, an ambitious female officer who in the first season joins the team just after graduating.

Although none of the main actors had had star status before the series debuted, all three of them rose to prominence and popularity during the 5-year-long run. Many of Poland's best known actors guest starred, usually playing roles of people involved in just one particular investigation. The serial was one of the most popular in Poland: each week it had an audience of 4 million.

== Main characters ==
- Marek Włodarczyk (as commissioner, later underinspector Adam Zawada)
- Maciej Zakościelny (as under-commissioner Marek Brodecki)
- Magdalena Schejbal (as under-commissioner, later commissioner Barbara Storosz)
- Tomasz Karolak (as aspirant Szczepan Żałoda)
- Ryszard Filipski (as inspector Ryszard Grodzki)
- Dorota Landowska (as prosecutor Dorota Wiśniewska)
- Ewa Kutynia (as aspirant Zuzanna Ostrowska)
- Kamil Maćkowiak (as prosecutor Jacek Dumicz)
- Lesław Żurek (as CBŚ agent Rafał Król)
- Alżbeta Lenska (as CBŚ agent Julia Wierzbicka)
