= Sonia Bohosiewicz =

Polish actress

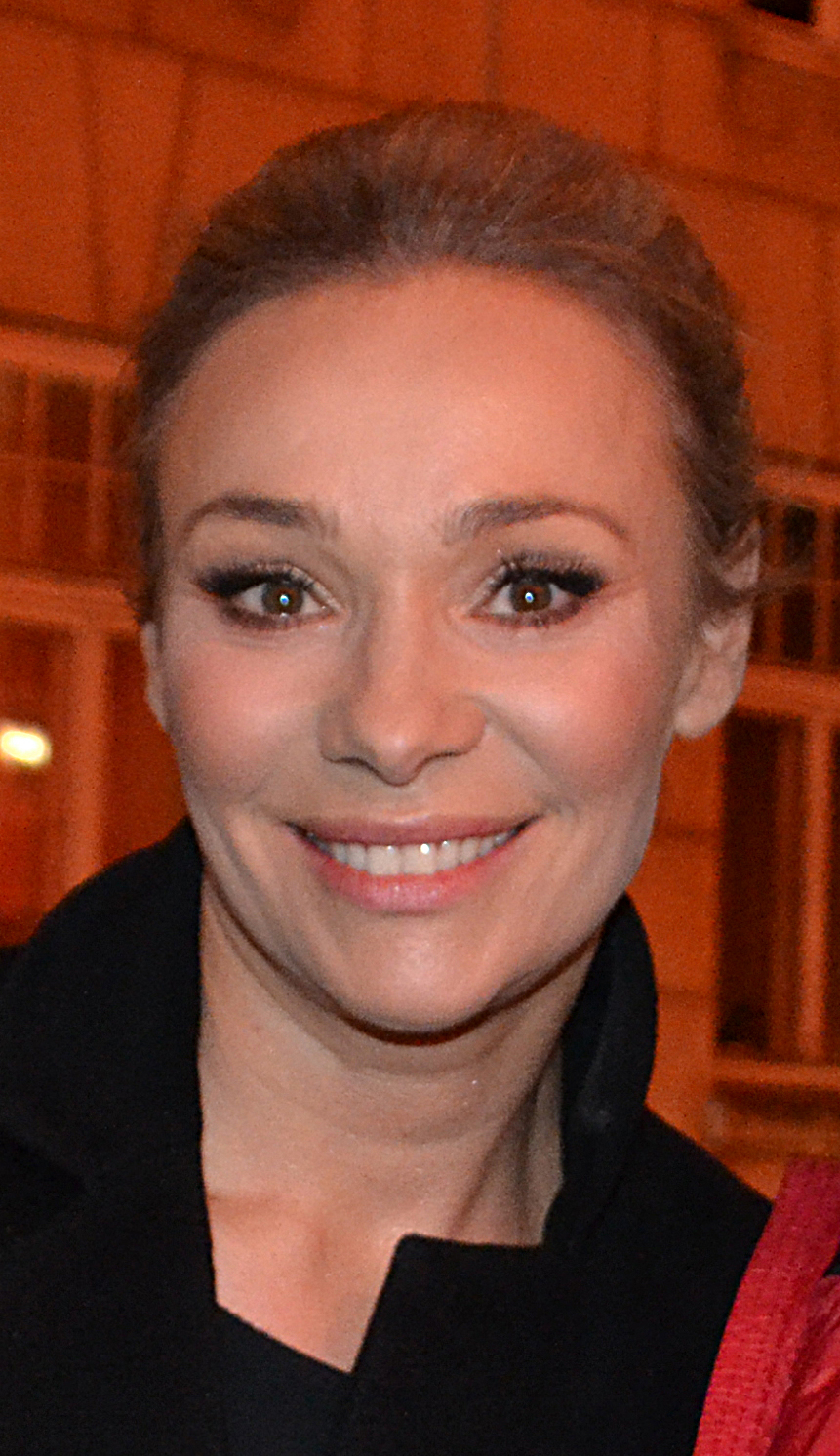
- Sonia Bohosiewicz, 2020
- Born: Sonia Bohosiewicz; 9 December 1975 (age 50); Cieszyn, Poland
- Occupations: Actress, cabaret artist, singer
- Years active: 1994–present
- Spouse: Paweł Majewski (married 2008–present)

Sonia Bohosiewicz (born 9 December 1975) is a Polish actress, cabaret artist and singer. She has appeared in such films as Rezerwat, Obława and Polish-Russian War and the television series Czas honoru.

== Early life ==
She was born into a family of Polish Armenians. She has three siblings: brothers Łukasz (born 1973) and Mateusz (born 1988), and sister Maja (born 1990). Both Maja and cousin Jakub Bohosiewicz are also actors.

Until the beginning of her studies, she lived in Żory, where she attended elementary school and then the Karol Miarka Liceum. In the last year of high school, she participated in acting workshops with Dorota Pomykała at the art-play studio. She graduated from the AST National Academy of Theatre Arts in Kraków.

== Personal life ==
In 2008, she married Paweł Majewski, son of director Janusz Majewski. The couple has two sons, Teodor (born 9 January 2009) and Leonard (born 22 April 2012).

== Filmography ==
Year	Title
1994	Spis cudzołożnic
1996	Bal błaznów
1997	Zdrada
1998	Wielka magia
1999	Miodowe lata
2000	Twórcy obrazów
2001	Ostatni blues (Az Utolso Blues)
2001	Samo niebo
2003	Show
2004	Na dobre i na złe
2005	Magda M.
2005	Zakochany Anioł
2005	Jestem
2006–2007	Pogoda na piątek
2006	Wielkie ucieczki
2007	I kto tu rządzi?
2007	Niania
2007	Rezerwat
2007	Pierwsza miłość
2007	Pozory mylą
2008–2009	39 i pół
2008	Jak żyć?
2008	Jeszcze nie wieczór
2008	Szkoła żon
2009	I pół
2009	Miłość na wybiegu
2009	Przystań
2009	Balladyna (The Bait)
2009	Wojna polsko-ruska
2009	Zero
2009	Zwerbowana miłość
2009	Rosyjskie konfitury
2010	Mała matura 1947
2010	Laura
2010–2011, 2020–2021	Usta usta
2011	80 milionów
2011	Aida
2011	Kac Wawa
2011	Ojciec Mateusz
2011	Wojna żeńsko-męska
2012	Być jak Kazimierz Deyna
2012	Obława
2012	Prawo Agaty
2012–2013	Był sobie dzieciak
2013	Podejrzani zakochani
2013	Syberiada polska
2013–2014	Czas honoru
2014	Obywatel
2014	Bogowie
2014	Polskie gówno
2014	Fotograf
2015	Prokurator
2015	Excentrycy, czyli po słonecznej stronie ulicy
2015	Zaręczyny
2015	Zakład Doświadczalny Solidarność
2015	Panie Dulskie
2015	Hiszpanka
2016	Na dobre i na złe
2016	Po prostu przyjaźń
2017–2019	Diagnoza
2018	Narzeczony na niby
2018	7 uczuć
2019	Proceder
2019	Czarny mercedes
2020	Zieja
2020	Jak zostać gwiazdą
2021	Inni ludzie
2022	Skarbek
2022	Pod wiatr

== Dubbing ==
Year	Title	Role
2008	Bolt	Marlena
2010	Mass Effect 2	Jacqueline Nought
2011	Happy Feet Two	Gloria
2013	Khumba	Nora
2014	Der 7bte Swerg	Voldemorta
2014	The Nut Job	Sunia
2016	Overwatch	Orisa
2017	The Nut Job 2: Nutty by Nature	Perła
2018	Incredibles 2	Evelyn Deavor
2019	Lady and the Tramp	Peg
