= 13 Years, 13 Minutes =

- Polish: 13 lat 13 minut
- Written by: Grzegorz Lubczyk
- Directed by: Marek Maldis
- Music by: Adam Galant
- Country of origin: Poland
- Original language: Polish

Production
- Cinematography: Krzysztof Kalukin
- Editor: Tadeusz Sosnkowski
- Running time: 55 minutes
- Production company: TVP Lublin

Original release
- Release: 2006

13 Years, 13 Minutes (Polish: 13 lat 13 minut) is a Polish historical film. It was released in 2006.

Romek Strzałkowski and Peter Mansfeld were young boys during the Poznań 1956 protests and Budapest 1956. Romek was the youngest victim.
