= True Law =

Polish legal drama television series

- Polish: Prawo Agaty
- Genre: Legal drama
- Created by: Karolina Frankowska
- Written by: Kaja Krawczyk; Piotr Szymanek
- Directed by: Maciej Migas; Patrick Yoka
- Starring: Agnieszka Dygant; Daria Widawska; Tomasz Karolak; Leszek Lichota; Małgorzata Kożuchowska
- Opening theme: "This Is the Life" by Amy Macdonald
- Composer: Łukasz Targosz
- Country of origin: Poland
- Original language: Polish
- No. of series: 7
- No. of episodes: 93 (list of episodes)

Production
- Production locations: Warsaw, Poland; Bydgoszcz, Poland
- Running time: 42-45 minutes (without adverts)
- Production company: TVN

Original release
- Network: TVN
- Release: 4 March 2012 – 26 May 2015

True Law (Polish: Prawo Agaty; lit. 'Agata's law') is a Polish legal drama television series directed by Maciej Migas and featuring Agnieszka Dygant as the title character, Agata Przybysz. It premiered on TVN on 4 March 2012. The plot is set in Warsaw.

== Plot ==
The series tells the story of Agata Przybysz (Agnieszka Dygant), coming from Bydgoszcz an over-thirty director of law section in a big insurance company, who loses her job as effect of some unpleasant events. Now she has to build her career life and private life from the beginning. Her friend, Dorota (Daria Widawska), offers her to launch a set of chambers together. For Agata, it is the brand new experience. The cases, people and their problems, that she faces in her new job, differ from the insurance cases she was used to.

== Cast ==
- Agnieszka Dygant as Agata Przybysz
- Daria Widawska as Dorota, Agata's friend
- Tomasz Karolak as Wojciech, Dorota's husband
- Leszek Lichota as Dębski
- Małgorzata Kożuchowska as prosecutor Maria Okońska
- Marian Opania as Agata's father
- Michał Mikołajczak as Bartek Janowski, Agata's assistant

== Ratings ==
True Law premiered on TVN on 4 March 2012 at 8:00 p.m. with two back-to-back episodes which attracted the audience of 3.57 million viewers with the share of 20.84%. In group "16-49" True Law reached share of 23.04% and was watched by 1.84 million viewers. It was the 14th most watched program of the weekend.

List of ratings by series
| Series | Episodes | Timeslot | Series premiere | Series finale | TV season | Viewers | Average share (16-49) |
|---|---|---|---|---|---|---|---|
| 1 | 15 | Sunday 8:00 p.m. (Episode 1); Sunday 9:00 p.m. (Episodes 2-15) | 4 March 2012 | 3 June 2012 | Spring 2012 | 2 991 164 | 20.1% |
| 2 | 13 | Tuesday 9:30 p.m. | 4 September 2012 | 27 November 2012 | Autumn 2012 | 2 729 497 | 21.6% |
| 3 | 13 | Tuesday 9:30 p.m. | 26 February 2013 | 21 May 2013 | Spring 2013 | 2 487 464 | 20.4% |
| 4 | 13 | Tuesday 9:30 p.m. | 3 September 2013 | 26 November 2013 | Autumn 2013 | 2 370 817 | 19.6% |
| 5 | 13 | Tuesday 9:30 p.m. | 4 March 2014 | 27 May 2014 | Spring 2014 | 2 168 407 | 17.0% |
| 6 | 13 | Tuesday 9:30 p.m. | 2 September 2014 | 25 November 2014 | Autumn 2014 | 2 129 943 | 15.0% |
| 7 | 13 | Tuesday 9:30 p.m. | 3 March 2015 | 26 May 2015 | Spring 2015 | 1 965 803 | 14.0% |

== International broadcast ==
Following the success in Poland, broadcast rights have been sold abroad. In Russia, the series airs under the local title Правосудие Агаты on Много ТВ. In Montenegro, two complete series have been broadcast on TV Vijesti after premiere on 9 June 2014 under title Agatino pravo.

== See also ==
- List of True Law episodes
