= Katarzyna Bujakiewicz =

Polish actress (born 1972)

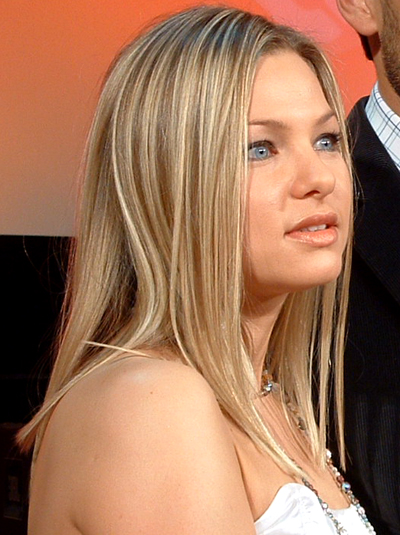
- Born: September 28, 1972 (age 53); Poznań, Poland

Katarzyna Bujakiewicz (pronounced [kataˈʐɨna bujaˈkʲɛvit͡ʂ]; born 28 September 1972 in Poznań) is a Polish actress. In 2003 she starred in the film An Ancient Tale: When the Sun Was a God under Jerzy Hoffman.
