= Paweł Małaszyński =

Polish actor

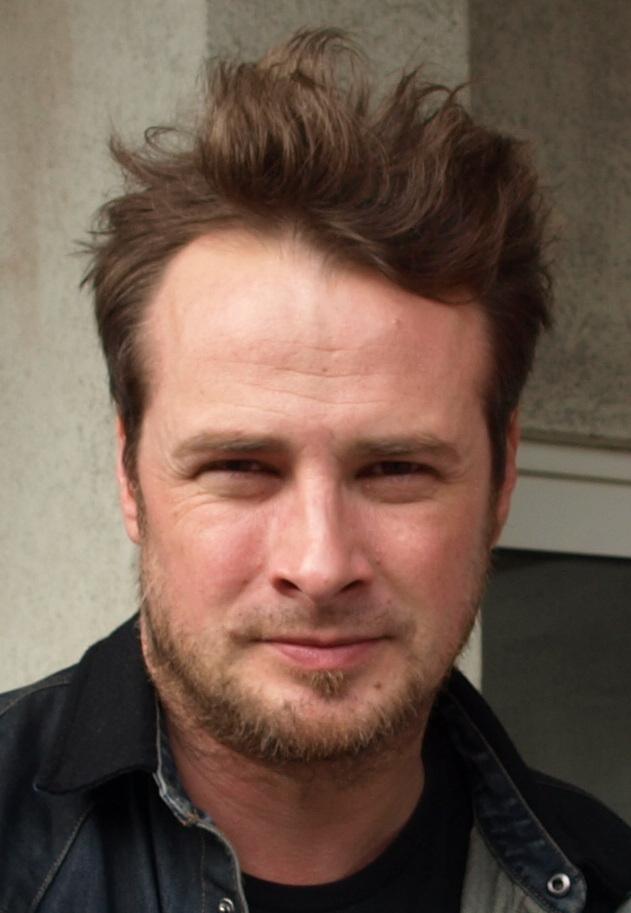
- Paweł Małaszyński in 2014
- Born: 26 June 1976 (age 49); Szczecinek, Poland
- Occupation: Actor
- Years active: 2001–present

Paweł Małaszyński (born 26 June 1976 in Szczecinek, Poland) is a Polish TV and film actor. He also leads a music band "Cochise".

== Starred in ==
- Grzechy sąsiadów (2024) - Kain
- Zdrada (2024) - Paweł Kamiński
- Unpredictable (2024) - Wojciech
- Gdzie diabeł nie może, tam baby pośle (2023) - Director of Polmos
- Generation Ikea (2023) - Gustaw
- The Secret of Little Rose (2023) - Krzysztof Lisowski
- Gdzie diabeł nie może, tam baby pośle (2022) - Director of Polmos
- Wojenne dziewczyny (2021) - Kruk
- Usta usta (2020) - Dominik, Magda's lover
- Friends (2020) - Artur Morawski
- Weekend (2010)
- Guardians of the Galaxy - Peter Quill / Star-Lord (Polish dubbing)
- Teraz albo nigdy! (2008) - Paweł Małaszyński
- Latający Cyprian (2008) - Martin
- Trzeci oficer (2008) - Jacek Wielgosz "Grand"
- Twarzą w twarz (2007) - Wiktor Waszak "Ważka"
- Katyń (2007) - Lieutenant Pilot Piotr Baszkowski
- Świadek koronny (2007) - Marcin Kruk
- Tajemnica Twierdzy Szyfrów (2007) - Johann Jorg
- Oficerowie (2006) - Jacek Wielgosz "Grand"
- Stowarzyszenie (2005) - Mareczek
- Oficer (2004–2005) - Jacek Wielgosz "Grand"
- Magda M. (2005–2007) - Piotr Korzecki
- Biała sukienka (2003) - Damian Przeździecki
- M jak miłość (2003) - Marcin Polański-Van Burgen (guest starring)
- Na dobre i na złe (2002) - Łukasz Sadowski (guest starring)
- Pianista (2002) - man in ghetto
- Kameleon (2001) - one of junkies
- Wiedźmin (2001) - youngster in tavern
