= Tomasz Konecki =

Polish film director

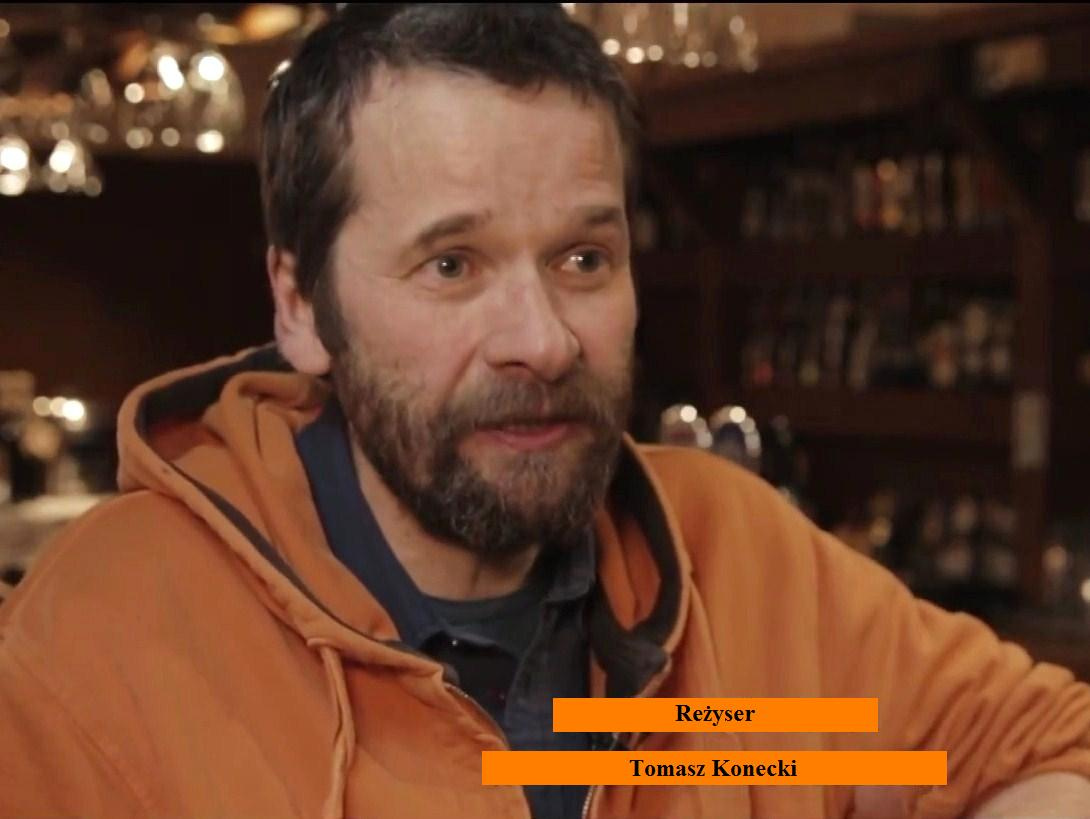
Tomasz Konecki

Tomasz Konecki (born 22 April 1962 in Warsaw) is a Polish film director.

A graduate of Warsaw University, he worked with TVP1. He has directed fifteen films including Testosteron and Lejdis.

== Filmography ==
=== Director ===
- Pół serio (2000)
- Ciało (2003)
- Tango z aniołem (2005-2006)
- Testosteron (2007)
- Lejdis (2007)
- The Perfect Guy for My Girl (Polish: Idealny facet dla mojej dziewczyny) (2009)

=== Actor ===
- Pół serio (2000)
- The Perfect Guy for My Girl (Polish: Idealny facet dla mojej dziewczyny) (2009)
