= Roma Gąsiorowska =

Polish actress and fashion designer (born 1981)

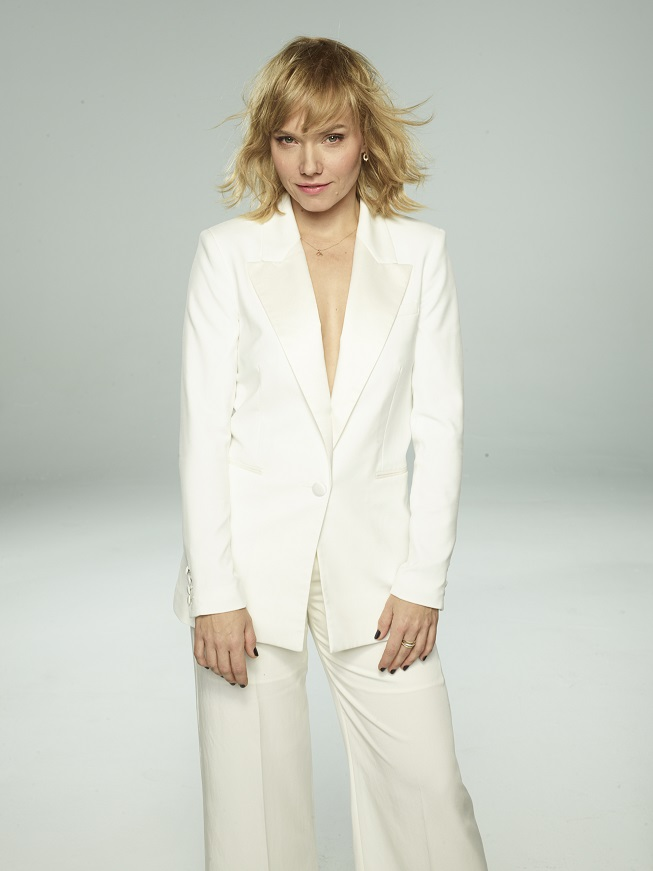
- Born: 18 November 1981 (age 44); Bydgoszcz, Poland
- Occupation: Actress
- Years active: 2003–present
- Partner(s): Michał Żurawski (since 2010)

Roma Gąsiorowska-Żurawska (born November 18, 1981 in Bydgoszcz) is a Polish actress and fashion designer. She played the role of "Sylwia" in the movie Suicide Room. She is one of the TR Warszawa theatre's actors. Roma was interested in acting in high school, where she created her own theatre. She graduated from the Ludwik Solski Academy for the Dramatic Arts. As a student, she started working in Teatr Rozmaitości. She debuted in Jerzy Stuhr's movie Tomorrow's Weather (2003).

== Filmography ==
=== Film ===
- 2003: Pogoda na jutro as Kinga Kozioł, daughter of Józefa
- 2004: Karol: A Man Who Became Pope as young theatre actress
- 2005: Oda do radości as Marta, Michał's girlfriend
- 2005: Wieża as Magda, Mateusz's girlfriend
- 2007: Futro as Olenka, Maklowieccy's housekeeper
- 2008: Kochaj i tańcz as Remigiusz assistant
- 2008: Wiem, kto to zrobił as Karolina Mołek
- 2008: Rozmowy nocą as Karolina, Bartek's friend
- 2009: Jestem Twój as Alicja, Marta's sister
- 2009: Moja krew jako nurse
- 2009: Tatarak as housekeeper
- 2009: Moja nowa droga as Alina
- 2009: Zero as Pornstar
- 2009: Esterházy as Ewa (voice only)
- 2009: Wojna polsko-ruska as Magda
- 2011: Letters to Santa as Doris
- 2011: W imieniu diabła as Michalina
- 2011: Suicide Room as Sylwia
- 2011: Ki as Ki
- 2012: Kac Wawa as Sandra
- 2018: Podatek od miłości as Agnieszka
- 2020: Amatorzy as Wiki
- 2022: Plan lekcji as Ela Makowiecka
- 2022: Dzisiaj śpisz ze mną as Nina Szklarska
- 2024: Listy do M. Pożegnania i powroty as Doris

=== Television ===
- 2004: Klan as teenager in bookstore
- 2005: Egzamin z życia as "Ruda", fan of "Perkoza"
- 2007: Pitbull as Monika Grochowska
- 2007: Pogoda na piątek as babysitter
- 2007: Prawo miasta as Ewa, Buncol's girlfriend
- 2008–2009: Londyńczycy as Mariola Monika Biedrzycka
- 2010: Ratownicy as Karolina "Lara" Kitowicz

=== Ethiudes ===
- 2004: 3 Love as Magda
- 2004: Powiedz coś as Daughter
- 2007: Zwierciadło

== Theatre ==
=== Theatrical roles ===
- 2003: Disco Pigs (written by Endy Walsh, directed by Krzysztof Jaworski)
- 2004: Dreams (written by Ivan Vyrypaev, directed by Łukasz Kos)
- 2004: Bash (written by Neil LaBute, directed by Grzegorz Jarzyna)
- 2005: Cokolwiek się zdarzy, kocham cię (written and directed by Przemysław Wojcieszek) as Sugar
- 2005: Tiramisu (written by Joanna Owsianko, directed by Aldona Figura) as Bajerka
- 2005: Noc (written by Andrzej Stasiuk, directed by Mikołaj Grabowski;) as Dusza (guest appearance Helena Modrzejewska National Stary Theater in Kraków)
- 2006: Dwoje biednych Rumunów mówiących po polsku (written by Dorota Masłowska, directed by Przemysław Wojcieszek) as Gina–Pyralgina
- 2006: Giovanni (written by Molière, directed by Grzegorz Jarzyna) as Zerlina at the Grand Theatre in Warsaw
- 2009: Między nami dobrze jest (written by Dorota Masłowska, directed by Grzegorz Jarzyna)
- 2009: The Picture of Dorian Gray (directed by Michał Borczuch)

=== Theatre on television ===
- 2004: Klucz as Lala
- 2004: Sceny z powstania... as Łączniczka
- 2006: I. znaczy inna as Nina
- 2006: Zorka as Iza
- 2007: Doktor Halina as Zosia

== Awards and nominations ==
- 2011 Award for Best Actress for her role in Ki
- 2011 Award for Best Actress for her role in Ki
- 2012 Polish Film Awards for Best Actress for her roles in Ki and Suicide Room (nomination)

== Career in fashion ==
Roma is also a fashion designer. Her most famous collections are "Amor Amor", "Stygmaty", "7 Grzechów" and "Stara Bardzo". She was nominated for the Róża Gali Award as "Debut in fashion world" which she didn't win.
