= Magdalena Różczka =

Polish actress (born 1978)

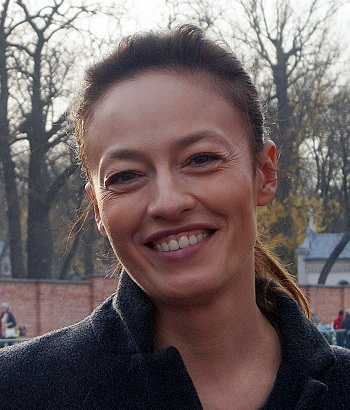
Magdalena Różczka, 2018

Magdalena Różczka (born 27 July 1978 in Nowa Sól) is a Polish actress. She appeared in the comedy television series Bao-Bab, czyli zielono mi in 2003.

In May 2010 she was appointed the UNICEF National Goodwill Ambassador.
