= Danuta Stenka =

Polish actress (born 1961)

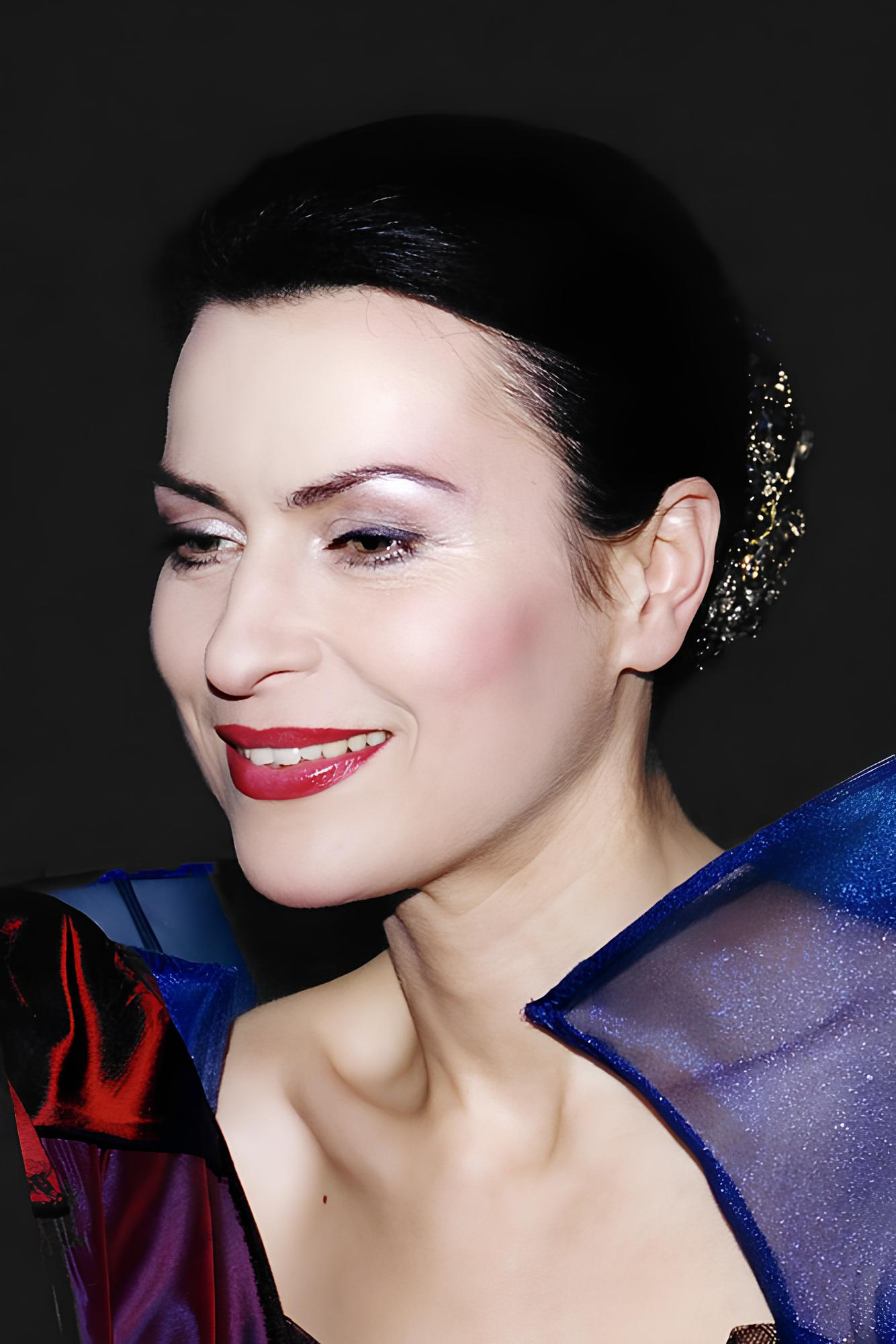
- Born: 10 October 1961 (age 64); Sierakowice, Gdańsk Voivodeship, Polish People's Republic
- Occupation: Actress

Danuta Stenka (born 10 October 1961 in Sierakowice, Poland) is a Polish actress. She made her stage debut in 1984 and since then acted in many productions receiving theatre awards for her performances. She made her big screen debut in 1995 and appeared in more than 60 movies since then. Stenka received two Polish Film Awards for Chopin: Desire for Love (2002) and Katyń (2007).

== Life and career ==
From 1991, Stenka spent a decade working at the Teatr Dramatyczny in Warsaw, then at TR Warszawa. She earned critical acclaim for her distinguished roles in Krzysztof Warlikowski's performances (Electra, The Taming of the Shrew, Krum, Angels in America and (A)pollonia). In 2003, she joined the ensemble of the National Theatre in Warsaw, taking on roles with many renowned directors, including Robert Wilson (Lady from the Sea), Grzegorz Jarzyna (Giovanni), and Maja Kleczewska (Phaedra, Marat/Sade, Oresteia). She played in many films and TV series and won over 30 awards for her theatre and film work. She received the Silver Medal for Merit to Culture‚ Gloria Artis’, awarded by the Polish Ministry of Culture.

== Selected filmography ==
Film
Year	Title	Role	Notes
1995	Prowokator	Marta Moraczewska	
1997	Szczęśliwego Nowego Jorku	wife of „Profesor”	
1998	Our strange child	Anna Kowalska	Nominated — Polish Academy Award for Best Actress
2001	Quo Vadis	Pomponia Graecina	
2002	Chopin: Desire for Love	George Sand	Polish Academy Award for Best Actress
2005	Pitbull	Infanticide	
2007	Katyń	Róża, a general's wife	Polish Academy Award for Best Supporting Actress
2009	Idealny facet dla mojej dziewczyny	Teresa Wodzień, aunt of Konstanty; Maria, mother of Konstanty	
2011	Daas	Duchess	
2012	Baby Blues	Jakubs' mother	
2012	Stones for the Rampart	Zdzisława Bytnarowa	
2016	Planet Single	Ania's mother	
2017	Letters to Santa 3	Rudolph the Red-Nosed Reindeer	
2018	Wilkołak	Jadwiga	
2019	Czarny Mercedes	Madame Magnes	
2019	Solid Gold	Krystyna	
2020	The Hater	Zofia Krasucka	Nominated — Polish Academy Award for Best Supporting Actress
2021	Letters to Santa 4	rudolf	

TV
Year	Title	Role	Notes
1998	Ekstradycja	Krystyna Małek	
2009	The Courageous Heart of Irena Sendler	Hannah Rozenfeld	
2009	Czas honoru	Margaret	
2017	Wojenne dziewczyny	Mother of Irka and Witek	
