= Kino Świat =

Polish independent film distributor and producer

Kino Świat ("world cinema") is a Polish independent film distributor and producer. The company was founded in Warsaw in 2001. It was honored by the Polish Film Institute for film distribution in 2011 and 2012.

DVD series Kino Świat released and distributed in Poland:

- “Golden Collection of Polish Cinema”
- “Great Film Adaptations” (Les Misérables, Robinson Crusoe, The Old Man and the Sea, Doctor Zhivago, The Great Gatsby)
- “Comedy Classics” (films from the Olsen Gang series)
- “Great Films – Great Directors” (Kola, Cinema Paradiso, Cyrano de Bergerac, Burnt by the Sun, The Hussar, Look at Me, The Hairdresser's Husband)
- “Family cinema”
- “Platinum series”
- “Jean-Pierre Melville”
- “Catherine Deneuve”
- “Percy Adlon”
- “Jean-Paul Belmondo”
- “Louis de Funès”
- “Woody Allen”
- “Brigitte Bardot”
- “Jean-Luc Godard”
- “Sam Peckinpah”
- “Alain Delon”
- “François Truffaut”
