= Łukasz Targosz =

Polish film composer (born 1977)

- Born: 20 February 1977 (age 49); Kraków, Poland
- Occupations: Musician, Film composer, music producer, film producer

Łukasz Targosz (Polish pronunciation: [ˈwukaʂ ˈtarɡɔʂ]; born 20 February 1977) is a Polish film composer, and music and film producer. A graduate from The Karol Szymanowski Academy of Music in Katowice (Jazz and Pop Music Department) in 2002.

He started his career as a session musician. After writing music for a movie entitled The Crown Witness, he gained recognition. He received two awards for his film music: in 2010 during Roma Fiction Fest for the best music written for a TV series Marked and during Los Angeles Cinema Festival of Hollywood (Winter 2015) for music composed for The Last Waltz. Radiostation RMF Classic as well as its listeners awarded Łukasz Targosz with MocArty for The Best Film Music of 2014 written to a TV series The Pack produced by HBO Poland.

He can boast of over 40 soundtracks for various cinematic projects – to begin with art house, through mainstream movies and animation, to end with new generation historic movies such as Stones for the Rampart by Robert Gliński, long-awaited screen version of a classical Polish novel by Aleksander Kamiński. A romantic comedy entitled Letters to St. Nicolas achieved box-office success in Poland while the soundtrack quickly reached gold record status; Love and Dance is the first Polish dance movie which was watched by a record-breaking number of viewers; Insiders – a thriller TV series was reviewed as one of the best Polish TV series; Marked was nominated during such festivals as RoseD'or, Monte-Carlo Television Festival and Roma Fiction Fest; the animation entitled The Game, which he also co-produced, was awarded during numerous international festivals, e.g. Boston International Film Festival, Mexico International Film Festival, On Location: Memphis International Film and Music Fest, Canada International Film Festival, Indie Fest. What is more, The Game was the only Polish animation which stood a chance to win an Oscar for the year 2012. He was also a co-producer of Floating Skyscrapers by Tomasz Wasilewski, one of top award-winning Polish movies in 2013 (International Film Festival in Karlovy Vary, T-Mobile New Horizons, Gdynia Film Festival).

He cooperated with various well-known artists, among them: Jennifer Batten (together they performed solos for Michael Jackson's Dirty Diana, which was used in the movie entitled Love and Dance), Renata Przemyk, Grzegorz Turnau, Janusz Radek, Robert Janowski, Doda, Afromental band.

He is a co-owner of the Music Production Studio SPOT which was found in 1999.

== Discography ==
Music composed to:

=== Films ===
- 2022 – Broad Peak
- 2020 – All My Friends Are Dead
- 2019 – The Coldest Game
- 2016 – Planet Single
- 2014 – Służby specjalne
- 2014 – Kamienie na szaniec aka Stones for the Rampart
- 2012 – Hans Kloss. Stawka większa niż śmierć
- 2011 – Letters to St. Nicolas
- 2011 – Los numeros
- 2010 – Skrzydlate świnie aka Flying Pigs
- 2009 – Kochaj i tańcz aka Love and Dance
- 2008 – Kierowca aka Limousine
- 2007 – Świadek koronny aka The Crown Witness
- 2006 – Być kwiatem

=== Short movie ===
- 2014 – Mocna kawa wcale nie jest taka zła aka Strong Coffee Isn't That Bad
- 2014 – Ostatni walc aka The Last Waltz
- 2013 – Mały palec aka Pinky
- 2011 – Mika

=== TV series ===
- 2026 – Proud
- 2023 – Infamy
- 2020 – The Woods
- 2015 – 2016 - Pakt aka The Pact
- 2015 – Służby specjalne
- 2014 – Wataha aka The Pack
- 2012 – 2014 – The Doctors
- 2012 – 2014 – Friends
- 2012 – 2014 – True Law
- 2011 – Układ Warszawski aka Warsaw Pact
- 2011 – Wszyscy kochają Romana (Polish TV series based on an American sitcom Everybody Loves Raymond)
- 2011 – Instynkt aka Instinct
- 2010 – 2011 – Usta usta (Polish TV series based on the British series Cold Feet)
- 2010 – 2011 – Klub szalonych dziewic (Polish TV series based on Rozengeur & Wodka Lime)
- 2010 – 2011 – Prosto w serce (Polish TV series based on an Argentinian soap opera Sos mi vida)
- 2009 – Naznaczony aka Marked
- 2008 – 2009 – 39 i pół
- 2008 – 2009 – BrzydUla (Polish TV series based on a Colombian telenovela Yo soy Betty, la fea)
- 2007 – Odwróceni aka Insiders
- 2006 – 2007 – Hela w opałach (Polish TV series based on an American sitcom Grace Under Fire)
- 2005 – 2009 – Niania (Polish TV series based on an American sitcom The Nanny)

=== Animation ===
- 2014 – 2015 – Mrówka szuka męża aka Ant is getting married
- 2014 – 2015 – Proszę mnie przytulić aka Hug me please
- 2014 – 2015 – Basia
- 2014 – 2015 – Latający Miś i spółka aka The Flying Bear and The Gang
- 2013 – 2014 – Myszy strajkują aka Mice on Strike
- 2013 – 2014 – Bear Me
- 2013 – 2014 – Head's Life
- 2012 – 2014 – Agi Bagi
- 2012 – 2014 – Fennec
- 2011 – The Game

=== Co-producer ===
- 2014 – 2015 – Mrówka szuka męża aka Ant is getting married
- 2014 – 2015 – Proszę mnie przytulić aka Hug me please
- 2014 – 2015 – Basia
- 2014 – 2015 – Latający Miś i spółka aka The Flying Bear and The Gang
- 2013 – 2014 – Myszy strajkują aka Mice on Strike
- 2013 – Płynące wieżowce aka Floating Skyscrapers
- 2013 – Mały palec
- 2013 – 2014 – Myszy strajkują aka Mice on Strike
- 2013 – 2014 – Bear Me
- 2013 – 2014 – Head's Life
- 2012 – 2014 – Agi Bagi
- 2012 – 2014 – Fennec
- 2011 – The Game
