= Agnieszka Dygant =

Polish actress (born 1973)

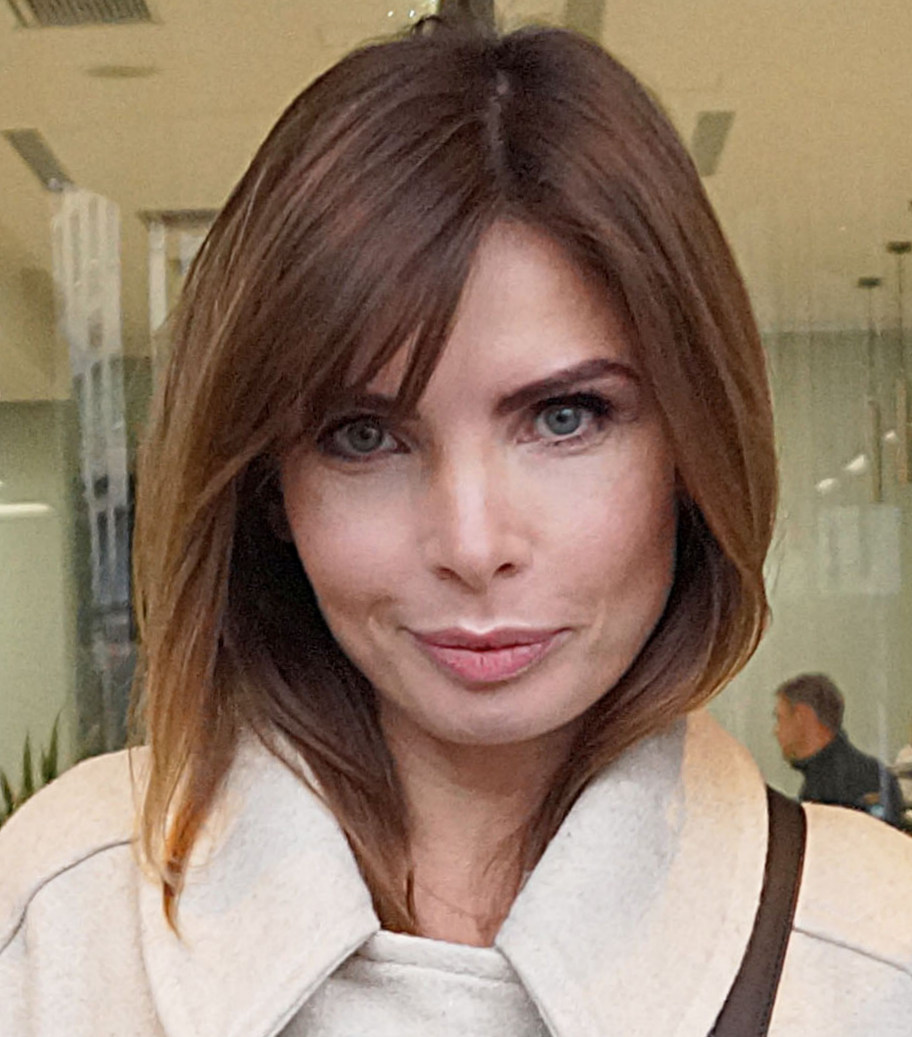
- Dygant in 2017
- Born: Agnieszka Urszula Dygant; 27 March 1973 (age 53); Piaseczno, Poland
- Occupation: Actress
- Years active: 1997–present
- Spouse: Marcin Władyniak (divorced)
- Partner: Patrick Yoka
- Children: 1

Agnieszka Urszula Dygant (born 27 March 1973) is a Polish actress. She is a two-time Telecameras winner for Best Actress.

== Biography ==
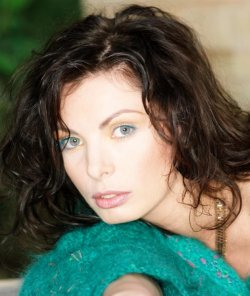
Dygant in 2008

Dygant has a sister 17 years younger named Natalia. She attended high school at the LVI Liceum Ogólnokształcące im. Rotmistrza Witolda Pileckiego in Warsaw. In her teenage years, she sang in the punk band Dekolt.

On 23 November 1997, Dygant made her theater debut. In 1998, she graduated from Łódź Film School and received the Łódź Voivode's award for the role of Julia in the play Letnica at the 16th Theater School Festival in Łódź, and won second prize at the 19th Stage Song Review in Wrocław, performing Agnieszka Osiecka's song "Sing-Sing" with Maciej Pawłowski's band. That same year, she made her television debut in Polsat's comedy mini-serial Gosia i Małgosia. She gained national fame for her roles as Maria "Mariola" Weiss-Korzycka in the TVP2 medical drama series Na dobre i na złe (2001–2009) and as Franciszka Zofia "Frania Maj" Skalska in TVN's comedy series Niania (2005–2009; Polish adaptation of CBS's The Nanny). She also has a minor role as Toruviel in the 2002 Polish television adaptation of The Witcher.

In 2000, she starred in the music video of the band Myslovitz, awarded with Fryderyk, "For You". In 2007, she became the second Polish star to advertise L'Oréal's Garnier brand products.

She received nine Telecameras nominations in the actress category, winning twice (2006, 2008) and placing second four times (2005, 2007, 2009, 2015).

In 2007, she received the Star of Smile at the VIII Festival of Good Humor in Gdańsk and two Golden Horseshoes at the Cieszyn Festival "Wakacyjne Kadry" for the best female role in a comedy series (Niania) and the best female role in a sensational series (Fala zbrodni).

== Personal life ==
Dygant was married to Marcin Władyniak. She currently cohabits with the director and screenwriter Patrick Yoka, with whom she has a son, Xawery (born 2010).

In an interview with Gazeta Wyborcza in October 2022, Dygant declared herself to be a feminist and a supporter of the right to abortion.

== Selected filmography ==
Year	Title	Role	Notes
1998	Farba	Ola	
2001–2009	Na dobre i na złe	Mariola	Regular role
2003–2007	Fala zbrodni	Daria "Czarna" Westman	Regular role
2005–2009	Niania	Frania Maj	Main character
2006	Just Love Me	Agata	
2011	Letters to Santa	Karina Lisiecka	
2012–2015	True Law	Agata Przybysz	Main character
2015	Letters to Santa 2	Karina Lisiecka	
2016	Pitbull. New Orders	"Kura"	
2017	Botoks	Dr Beata Winkler	
2017	Letters to Santa 3	Karina Lisiecka	
2018	Botoks	Dr Beata Winkler	TV series based on the film of the same name
2018	Women of Mafia	Daria "Nanny" Wawrzyniak	
2018	Women of Mafia	Daria "Nanny" Wawrzyniak	TV series based on the film of the same name
2019	Women of Mafia 2	Daria "Nanny" Wawrzyniak	
2024	The Thaw	Maria Lańska	Season 2
2026	Genialna M.	Marta	Main character

=== Dubbing ===
- Geronimo Stilton (TV series) (2010–2015) – Thea Stilton
- Rio (2011) and Rio 2 (2014) – Julia
- Cars 2 (2011) – Liliana Lifting
