= Borys Szyc =

Polish actor and musician

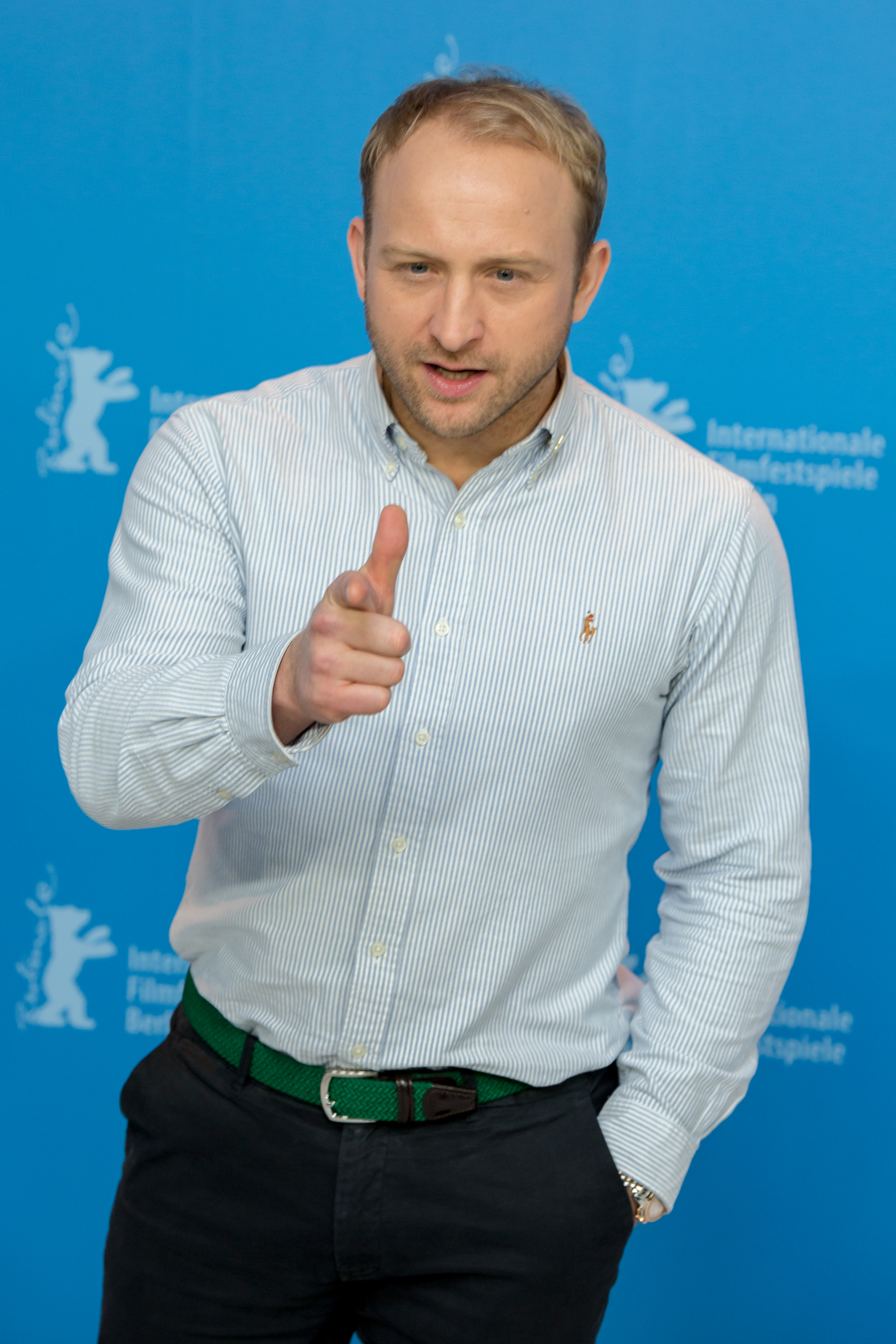
- Szyc at Berlinale 2017
- Born: Borys Michalak; 4 September 1978 (age 47); Łódź, Poland
- Occupations: Actor, musician, singer
- Musical career
- Genres: Pop
- Label: EMI Music Poland

Borys Michał Szyc-Michalak (Polish: [bɔrɨs ʂɨt͡s]; born Borys Michalak; 4 September 1978) is a Polish film and theatre actor and musician. In 2010, he received the Polish Academy Award for Best Actor.

== Life and career ==
He was born in Łódź, Poland. He graduated from High School No. 26 in Łódź. In 2001, he graduated from Warsaw-based Aleksander Zelwerowicz State Theatre Academy and started a successful film and theatre career. Since 2001, he has performed at Teatr Współczesny in Warsaw. In 2007, he was awarded the Wiktor, the prize of the public Polish Television (TVP), for the best Polish TV actor.

He achieved nationwide popularity by starring in such films as Vinci (2004), Testosteron (2007), Mole (2011), The Secret of Westerplatte (2013), Persona Non Grata (2015), Spoor (2017) and Cold War (2018). Apart from his film career he appeared in numerous popular TV series including For Better or Worse, Honey Years, Foster Family, Kasia i Tomek and Niania.

In 2008 he recorded a single "Choć wieje, pada, grzmi" with Justyna Steczkowska. In November the same year he recorded his debut studio album Feelin' Good released by EMI Music Poland with guest appearances by Ewa Bem, Kasia Cerekwicka, Marysia Starosta and Justyna Steczkowska.

In 2011, he recorded a song "Śpiewka" (composed by Krzesimir Dębski) together with Natasza Urbańska which was used in the film Battle of Warsaw 1920 directed by Jerzy Hoffman.

== Personal life ==
He was in a relationship with Anna Bareja with whom he has a daughter Sonia. In 2008 he was banned from driving for two years by a court ruling for drunk driving. In 2019, he married Justyna Szyc-Nagłowska with whom he has a son, Henryk, born in 2020.

== Discography ==
=== Studio albums ===
Title	Album details	Peak chart positions
Title	Album details	POL
Feelin' Good	Released: November 30, 2009; Label: EMI Music Poland; Formats: CD, digital download	44
"—" denotes a recording that did not chart or was not released in that territory.

=== Music videos ===
Title	Year	Album	Ref.
"Do jutra"	2009	Feelin' Good	

== Filmography ==
=== Actor ===
- Enduro bojz (2000) as Motorcyclist
- Stacja (2001) as Tomek
- The Spring to Come (2001) as Wojciech Buławnik
- E=mc² (2002) as Student
- Magiczne drzewo (2004, TV series)
- Symmetry (2004) as Albert
- Vinci (2004) as Julian
- The Welts (2004) as Bartosz
- Oficer (2005) as Tomasz ‘Kruszon’ Kruszyński
- Chaos (2006) as Łysy
- Janek (2006)
- Droga wewnętrzna (2006)
- Oficerowie (2006) as Tomasz ‘Kruszon’ Kruszon
- Job, czyli ostatnia szara komórka (2006) as Chemist
- South by North (2006) as Jakub
- Hyena (2006) as Kid's father, Iceman, Bryndza's son
- Ryś (2007) as Policeman
- Tajemnica twierdzy szyfrów (2007) as Untersturmführer Matheas Beer
- Testosterone (2007) as Tytus
- Lejdis (2008)
- Grom (2008)
- And a Warm Heart (2008)
- Snow White and Russian Red (2008) as Jobbo
- Trzeci oficer (2008) as Tomasz ‘Kruszon’ Kruszyński
- The Mole (2011)
- Battle of Warsaw 1920 (2011) as Jan Krynicki
- Criminal Empire for Dummy's (2013) as Skinhead
- Tajemnica Westerplatte (2013) as Lieut. Stefan Grodecki
- Persona Non Grata(2015) as Pesh
- Spoor (2017)
- Kamerdyner (2018) as Fryderyk von Krauss
- Cold War (2018) as Lech Kaczmarek
- Mowa Ptaków (2019)
- Piłsudski (2019) as Józef Piłsudski
- World on Fire (2019-) as Konrad
- Magnesium (2020) as Zbroja Lewenfisz
- Into the Night (2020-2021) as a Polish soldier
- Operation: Nation (2022) as Roman
- Warszawianka (2023) as Franek "Czuly" Czułkowski
- Joika (2023) as Andrei Vadys
- Furia (2023) as Ziminov
- Forst (2024) as Detective Wiktor Forst
- Simona Kossak (2024) as Batura
- The Doll (2026) as Baron Krzeszowski

=== Polish dubbing ===
- Gnomeo & Juliet (2011) as Tybalt
- George the Hedgehog (2011) as George the Hedgehog
- Contact High (2009) as Schorsch
- Esterhazy (2009) as Ewa's father
- The True Story of Puss'N Boots (2009) as Puss in Boots
- Assassin's Creed (2008) as Malik Al-Saif
- Bolt (2008) as Bolt
- Asterix at the Olympic Games (2008) as Brutus
- Go West: A Lucky Luke Adventure (2007) as Joe Dalton
- Donkey Xote (2007) as Rocinante
- TMNT (2007) as Raphael
- Broken Sword: The Angel of Death (2006) as George Stobbart
- Home on the Range (2004)
- The Bard's Tale (2004) as Bard
- Spy Kids 3-D: Game Over (2003) as Raz
- Chicago 1930 (2003) as Edward Nash
- 8 Mile (2002) as Jimmy 'Rabbit' Smith Jr
- Dragon Ball Z: Fusion Reborn (1995) as Vegeta
- Dragon Ball Z: Wrath of the Dragon (1995) as Vegeta

== Theatrical roles ==
- Bambini di Praga (2001, directed by Agnieszka Glińska, Teatr Współczesny in Warsaw)
- Wniebowstąpienie – Tadeusz Konwicki (2002, directed by Maciej Englert, Teatr Współczesny in Warsaw)
- Stracone zachody miłości – William Shakespeare (2003, directed by Agnieszka Glińska, Teatr Współczesny in Warsaw)
- Pułkownik Ptak [The Colonel Bird] – Hristo Boychev (2003, directed by Piotr Nowak)
- Dobry wieczór kawalerski – Dorota Truskolaska (directed by Jerzy Bończak)
- Porucznik z Inishmore – Martin McDonagh (2003, directed by Maciej Englert, Teatr Współczesny in Warsaw)
- Nieznajome z Sekwany [Die Unbekannte aus der Seine] – Ödön von Horváth (2004, directed by Agnieszka Glińska, Teatr Współczesny in Warsaw)
- Transfer (2005, directed by Maciej Englert, Teatr Współczesny in Warsaw)
- Udając ofiarę [Playing the Victim] – Oleg and Vadimir Presnyakov (2006, directed by Maciej Englert, Teatr Współczesny in Warsaw)
- Proces – Franz Kafka (2008, directed by Maciej Englert, Teatr Współczesny in Warsaw)
