= Tomasz Karolak =

Polish actor (born 1971)

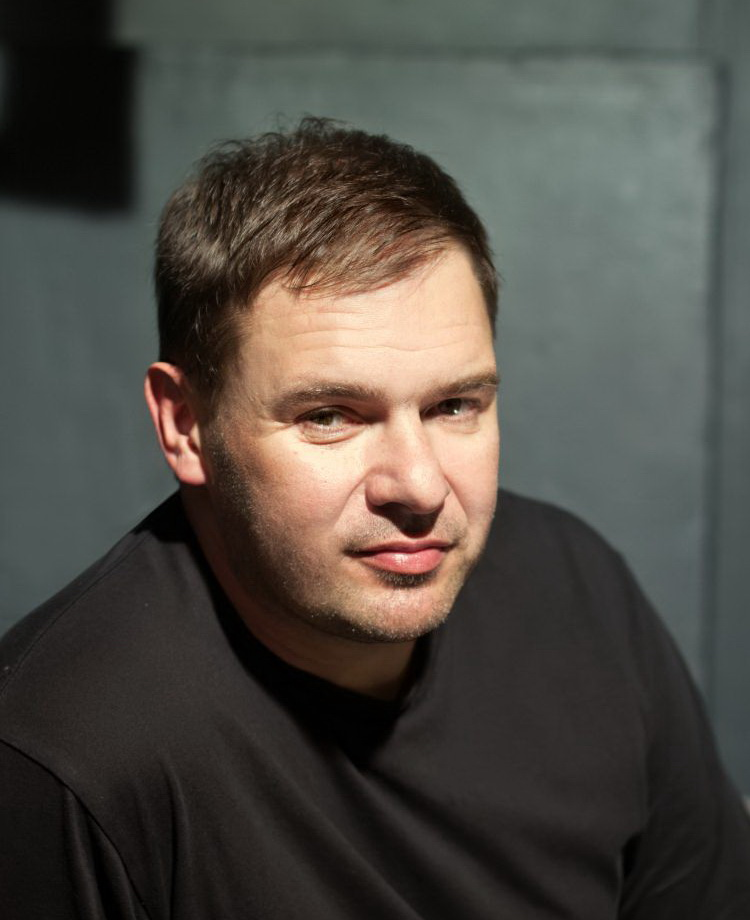
- Karolak in 2013
- Born: Tomasz Paweł Karolak; 21 June 1971 (age 54); Radom, Poland
- Occupation: Actor
- Years active: 1997–present

Tomasz Karolak (born 21 June 1971) is a Polish actor.

== Biography ==
He was born in Radom, where his parents – Hanna and Andrzej Karolak – were officers of the Polish People's Army during the Polish People's Republic (they served in the Air Regiment and Missile Squadron). He appeared in the comedy television series Bao-Bab, czyli zielono mi in 2003. He lived among others in Ustronie Morskie, Warsaw and Mińsk Mazowiecki, where he was involved in drama club work.

After the failed exam to theater school in Warsaw, he got a degree in rehabilitation at the University of Warsaw. On his fourth try, he got into Kraków's National Theatre School, graduating in 1997. He worked as a salesman and builder, and in college he was a bodyguard.

== Career ==
He has performed in theaters in Kraków: in the Julius Slovak (1997–1999), Scenes STU (1997–1999), New in Lodz (1999–2003, 2005) and at theaters in Warsaw: Assembly Plant (2002), National (2003–2004), Variety (2005) and Art Centre M25 [Minsk 25] (2006). In 2003, during the XXVIII Opole Theatre Confrontations in Opole received the award for her role acting in the play "The Water Hen" Witkiewicz at the New Theatre in Lodz.

He made his big screen debut in the film role of sentinel The Big Animal (2000). He became popular in the TV series Kryminalni (2004–2007) as a senior midshipman Szczepan Żałoda. He appeared in three seasons of the series 39 i pół in the Darek Jankowski role.

In September 2008, he was the fourth jury member in the show "Jak oni śpiewają" (Soapstar Superstar). In March 2010 he opened his own theater called Teatr IMKA. In 2010 he won the prize for the most beautiful guy not in the competition "Szymon Majewski Show".

He was an Ambassador of the Polish Championships in long-distance triathlon on Drought Herbalife Triathlon 2011 and a member of the triathlon AT Team. On 1 February 2013 he released the first single, titled "Just Be", promoting the debut studio album. The lyrics were written by Paweł Kukiz. In addition, the song was also made in the Valentine's Day episode Rodzinka.pl. The premiere will take place as announced in the autumn of the same year. The album will be released by the record label Magic Records.

He started his music career creating a band called "Pączki w Tłuszczu" and realising a single "Tylko bądź", which text is written by Paweł Kukiz.

In 2019, he made a guest appearance on the Big Brother show. In 2020, he was nominated for the Telekamera "TeleTygodnia" in the "actor" category.

== Awards ==
- 2009 – Telekamery Award in the Actor category
- 2014 – Bronze Medal for Merit to Culture – Gloria Artis
