= 2022 Polish Film Awards =

24th Polish Film Awards
- Date: 6 June 2022
- Site: Polish Theatre, Warsaw, Poland
- Hosted by: Maciej Stuhr

Highlights
- Best Film: Quo Vadis, Aida?

Television coverage
- Network: Canal+

The 24th Polish Film Awards took place on 6 June 2022 at the Polish Theatre in Warsaw, Poland. The ceremony honored the best in Polish cinema of 2021, presented by the Polish Film Academy. It was hosted by actor Maciej Stuhr.

== Winners and nominees ==
The nominations were announced on 16 April 2022. Winners are listed first, highlighted in boldface, and indicated with a double dagger (‡).

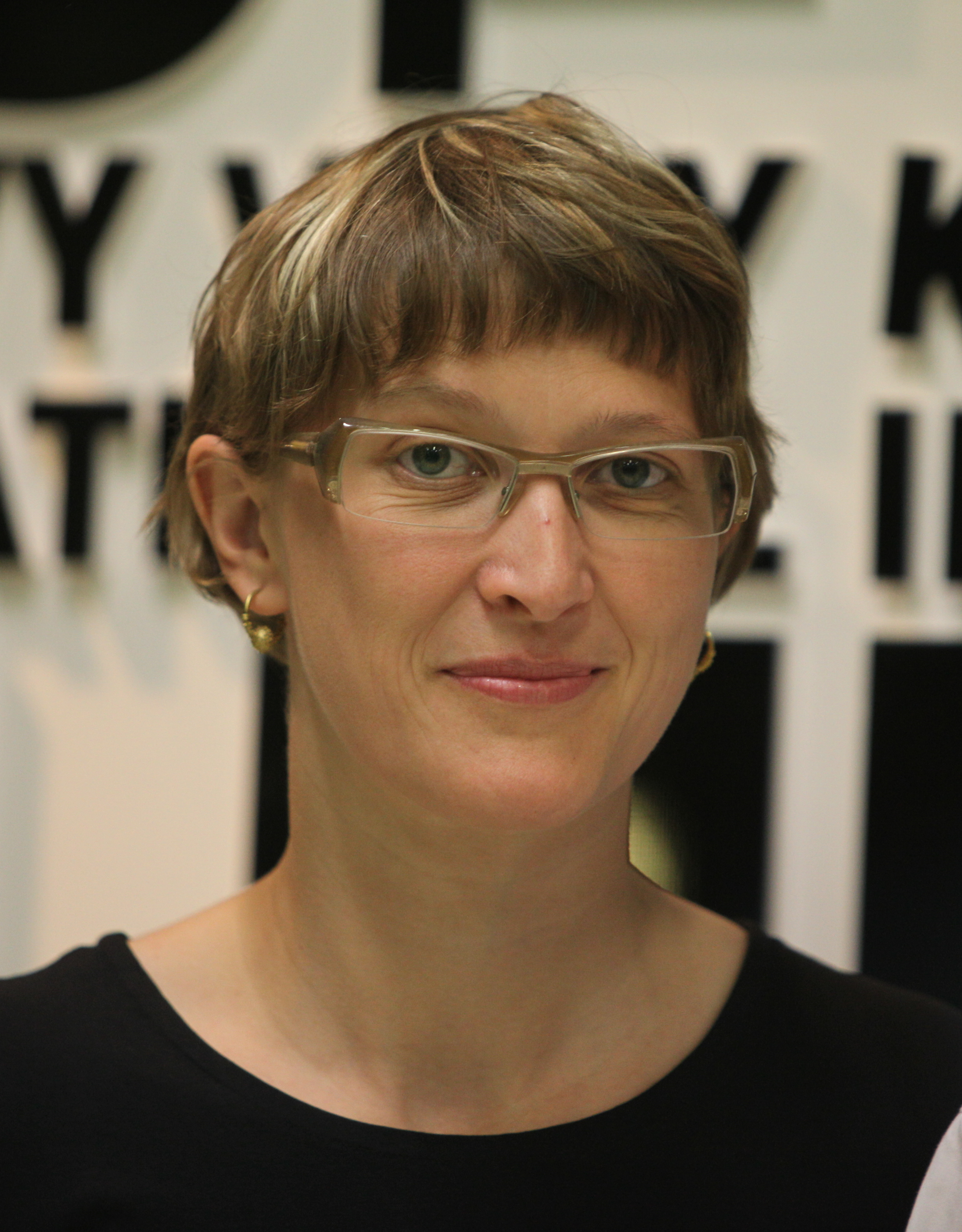
Jasmila Žbanić, Best Director and Best Screenplay winner

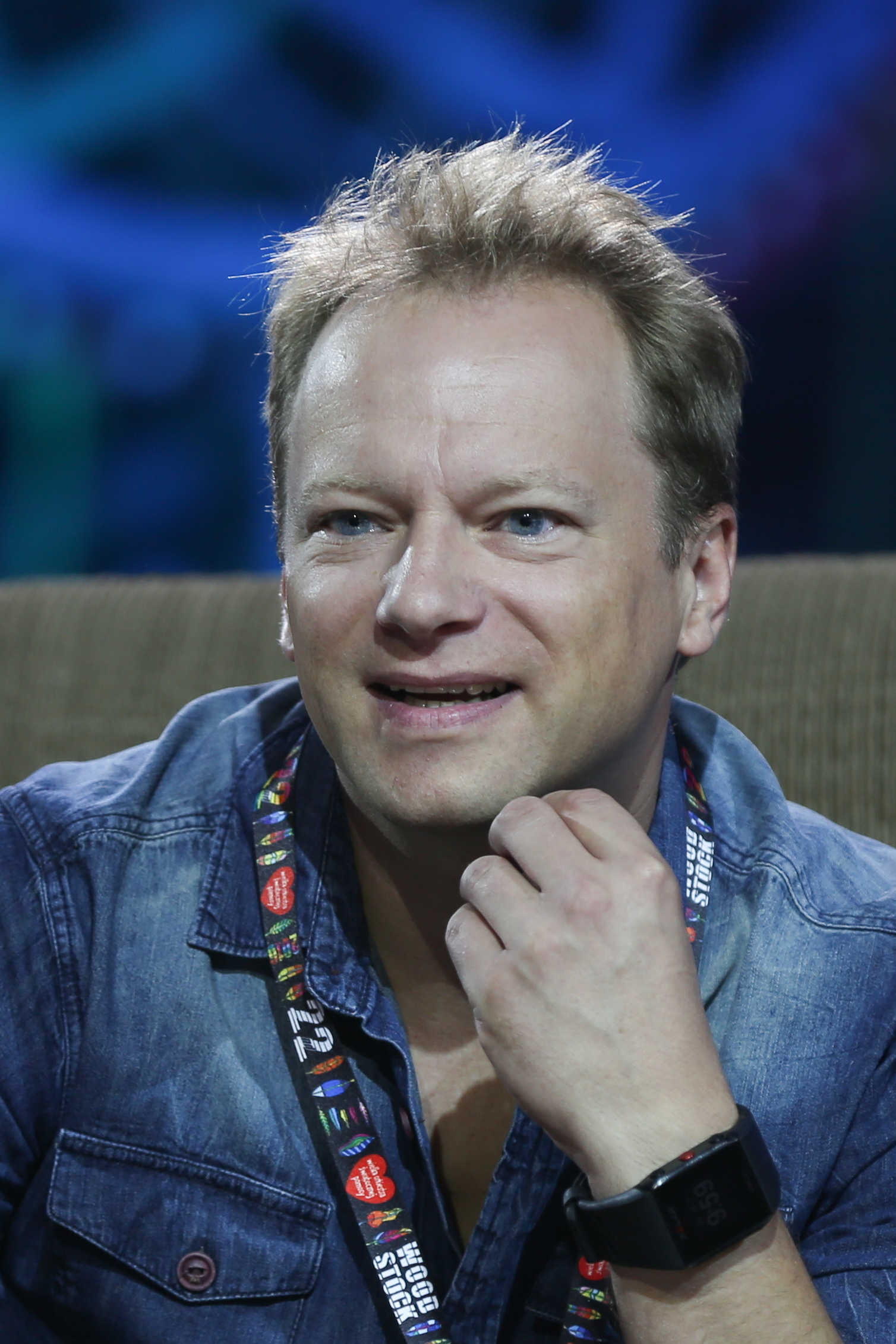
Maciej Stuhr, Best Actor winner

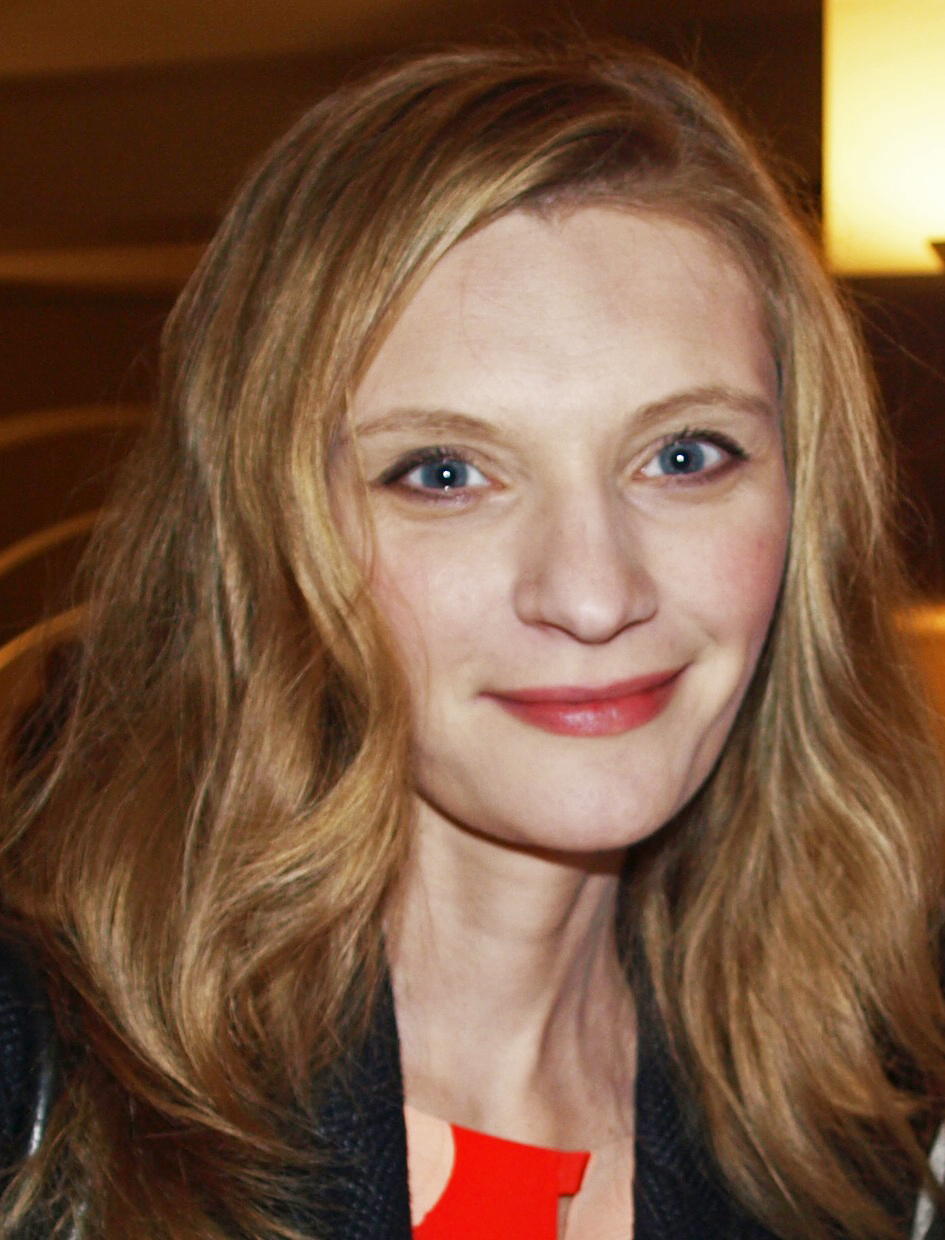
Agata Buzek, Best Actress winner

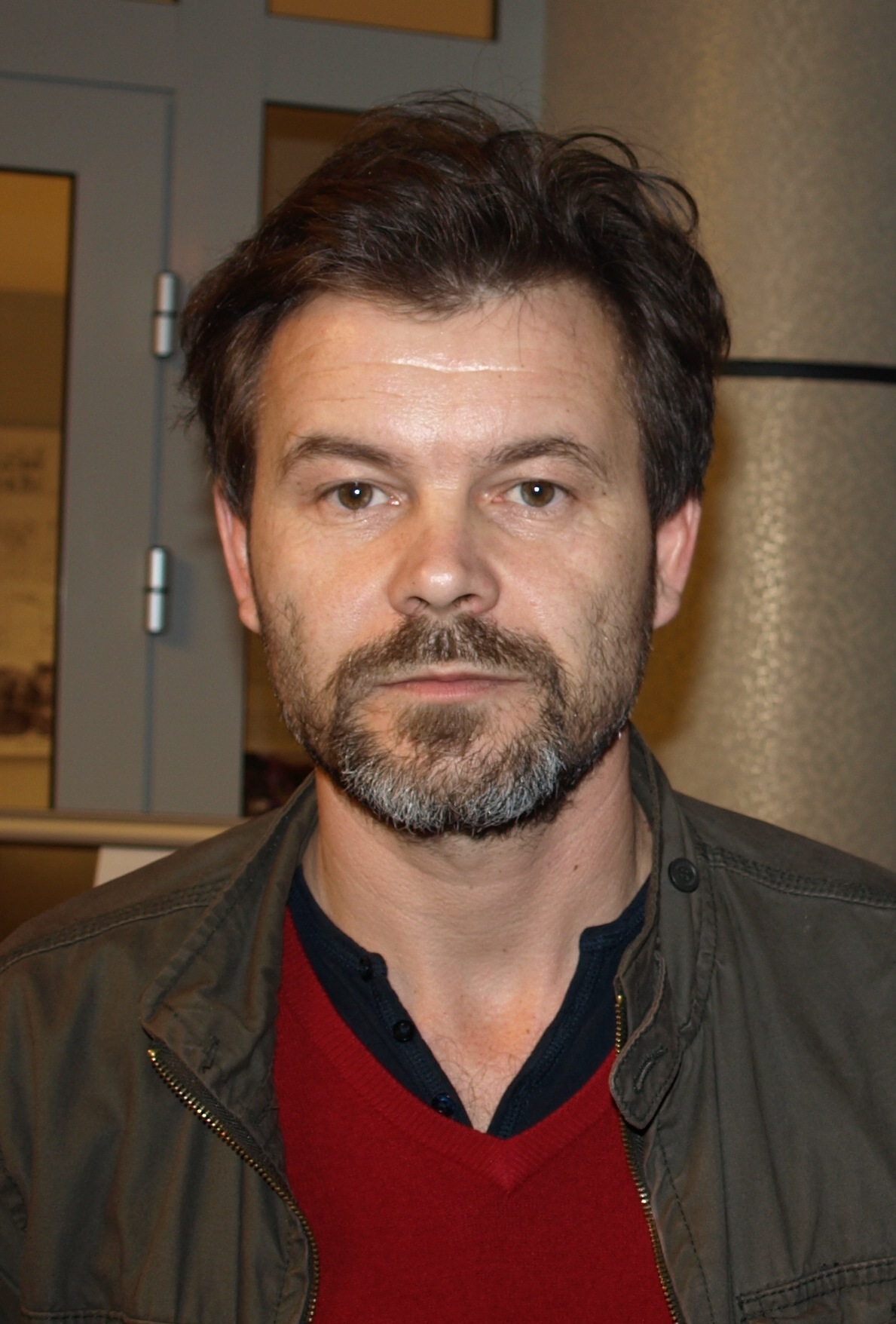
Jacek Braciak, Best Supporting Actor winner

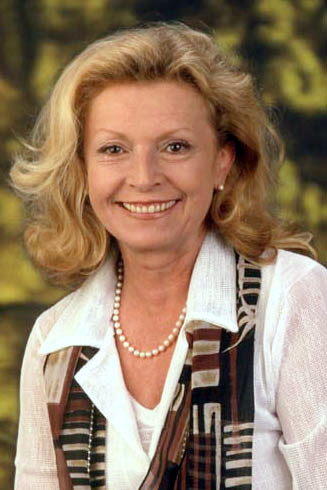
Ewa Wiśniewska, Best Supporting Actress winner

**Best Film**: **Quo Vadis, Aida? – Jasmila Žbanić**‡; All Our Fears – Łukasz Ronduda and Łukasz Gutt; Leave No Traces – Jan P. Matuszyński; My Wonderful Life – Łukasz Grzegorzek; The Wedding – Wojciech Smarzowski	**Best European Film**: **Another Round – Thomas Vinterberg (Denmark / Sweden / Netherlands)**‡; Annette – Leos Carax (France / Mexico / United States / Switzerland / Belgium / Japan / Germany); Berlin Alexanderplatz – Burhan Qurbani (Germany / Netherlands / France / Canada); The Father – Florian Zeller (United Kingdom / France); Titane – Julia Ducournau (France / Belgium)
**Best TV Series**: **The Mire '97 – Jan Holoubek (Netflix)**‡; Behawiorysta – Łukasz Palkowski and Marek Wróbel (TVN Group); Klangor – Łukasz Kośmicki (Canal+); Raven – Maciej Pieprzyca (Canal+); Sexify – Kalina Alabrudzińska and Piotr Domalewski (Netflix)	**Best Director**: **Jasmila Žbanić – Quo Vadis, Aida?**‡; Jan P. Matuszyński – Leave No Traces; Łukasz Ronduda and Łukasz Gutt – All Our Fears; Magnus von Horn – Sweat; Paweł Łoziński – The Balcony Movie; Wojciech Smarzowski – The Wedding
**Best Actor**: **Maciej Stuhr – Back to Those Days as Alek Malinowski**‡; Jacek Braciak – My Wonderful Life as Witek Lisiecki; Piotr Głowacki – The Champion as Tadeusz Pietrzykowski "Teddy"; Robert Więckiewicz – The Wedding as Ryszard Wilk; Tomasz Ziętek – Leave No Traces as Jurek Popiel	**Best Actress**: **Agata Buzek – My Wonderful Life as Joanna "Jo" Lisiecka**‡; Jasna Đuričić – Quo Vadis, Aida? as Aida Selmanagić; Magdalena Koleśnik – Sweat as Slywia Zajac; Maria Dębska – Autumn Girl as Kalina Jędrusik; Sandra Korzeniak – Leave No Traces as Barbara Sadowska
**Best Supporting Actor**: **Jacek Braciak – Leave No Traces as Tadeusz Popiel**‡; Adam Woronowicz – My Wonderful Life as Maciek; Andrzej Chyra – All Our Fears as Daniel's father; Borys Szyc – Autumn Girl as Kazio; Łukasz Simlat – Sonata as Łukasz Płonka	**Best Supporting Actress**: **Ewa Wiśniewska – Back Then as Grandma**‡; Anna Dymna – Amateurs as Matka Krzyśka; Agata Kulesza – The Wedding as Ela Wilk; Agnieszka Grochowska – Leave No Traces as Grażyna Popiel; Aleksandra Konieczna – Leave No Traces as Prosecutor Wiesława Bardon; Jowita Budnik – All Our Fears as Jadwiga Majewska
**Best Screenplay**: **Quo Vadis, Aida? – Jasmila Žbanić**‡; All Our Fears – Łukasz Ronduda, Michał Oleszczyk and Katarzyna Sarnowska; Leave No Traces – Kaja Krawczyk-Wnuk; My Wonderful Life – Łukasz Grzegorzek; The Wedding – Wojciech Smarzowski	**Best Cinematography**: **The Wedding – Piotr Sobociński Jr**‡; All Our Fears – Łukasz Gutt; The Champion – Witold Płóciennik; Furioza – Klaudiusz Dwulit; The In-Laws – Michał Englert; Leave No Traces – Kacper Fertacz; Żużel – Arthur Reinhart
**Best Production Design**: **Autumn Girl – Wojciech Żogała**‡; The Champion – Ewa Skoczkowska; Leave No Traces – Paweł Jarzębski; Magnesium – Marek Warszewski; The Musicians – Katarzyna Sobańska and Marcel Sławiński; The Wedding – Marek Warszewski	**Best Makeup and Hairstyling**: **Magnesium – Waldemar Pokromski and Agnieszka Hodowana**‡; The Champion – Mirosława Wojtczak; Furioza – Alina Janerka; Leave No Traces – Pola Guźlińska; The Musicians – Dariusz Krysiak
**Best Costume Design**: **Magnesium – Dorota Roqueplo**‡; Death of Zygielbojm – Elżbieta Radke; The Getaway King – Marta Ostrowicz; Hitler's Aunt – Paweł Grabarczyk and Wanda Kowalska; Leave No Traces – Małgorzata Zacharska; The Musicians – Paweł Grabarczyk and Wanda Kowalska	**Best Film Score**: **Back to Those Days – Marcin Masecki**‡; Death of Zygielbojm – Jan A. P. Kaczmarek; Everyone Has a Summer – Szymon Wysocki; Gierek – Maciej Zieliński; Magnesium – Jan A. P. Kaczmarek; Mosquito State – Cezary Skubiszewski; The Wedding – Mikołaj Trzaska
**Best Sound**: **Sonata – Artur Kuczkowski and Tomasz Sikora** ‡; Back Then – Leszek Freund; Death of Zygielbojm – Marek Wronko and Krzysztof Jastrząb; Furioza – Jerzy Murawski and Franciszek Kozłowski; The Getaway King – Mateusz Adamczyk, Zofia Moruś, Bartosz Putkiewicz and Sebastian Witkowski; Leave No Traces – Kacper Habisiak, Sebastian Crueghe and Jarosław Bajdowski; Mosquito State – Zofia Moruś, Mateusz Adamczyk and Sebastian Witkowski; Sweat – Michał Robaczewski; The Wedding – Radek Ochnio	**Best Editing**: **Quo Vadis, Aida? – Jarosław Kamiński**‡; The Balcony Movie – Paweł Łoziński, Bartłomiej Piasek and Piotr Wójcik; Escape to the Silver Globe – Iza Pająk and Laura Pawela; Lamb – Agnieszka Glińska; The Wedding – Krzysztof Komander
**Best Documentary**: **The Balcony Movie – Paweł Łoziński**‡; 1970 – Tomasz Wolski; Escape to the Silver Globe – Kuba Mikurda; Judges Under Pressure – Kacper Lisowski; Polanski, Horowitz. The Wizards from the Ghetto – Mateusz Kudła and Anna Kokoszka-Romer	**Discovery of the Year**: **Łukasz Gutt – All Our Fears (Directing)**‡; Iwona Siekierzyńska – Amateurs (Directing/Screenplay); Jakub Michalczuk – The In-Laws (Directing); Mateusz Kudła and Anna Kokoszka-Romer – Polanski, Horowitz. The Wizards from the Ghetto (Directing); Mateusz Rakowicz – The Getaway King (Directing/Screenplay)
**Audience Award**: **The Wedding – Wojciech Smarzowski**	**Life Achievement Award**: **Jerzy Skolimowski**

== Films with multiple awards and nominations ==
Films with multiple nominations
Nominations	Film
13	Leave No Traces
10	The Wedding
7	All Our Fears
5	My Wonderful Life
5	Quo Vadis, Aida?
4	The Champion
4	Magnesium
3	Autumn Girl
3	The Balcony Movie
3	Death of Zygielbojm
3	Furioza
3	The Getaway King
3	The Musicians
3	Sweat
2	Amateurs
2	Back Then
2	Back to Those Days
2	Escape to the Silver Globe
2	The In-Laws
2	Mosquito State
2	Polanski, Horowitz. The Wizards from the Ghetto
2	Sonata

Films with multiple wins
Wins	Film
4	Quo Vadis, Aida?
2	Back to Those Days
2	Magnesium
2	The Wedding
