= The Girl with the Needle =

2024 film by Magnus von Horn

- Theatrical release poster
- Danish: Pigen med nålen
- Directed by: Magnus von Horn
- Written by: Magnus von Horn; Line Langebek
- Produced by: Malene Blenkov; Mariusz Włodarski
- Starring: Vic Carmen Sonne; Trine Dyrholm; Besir Zeciri; Joachim Fjelstrup; Tessa Hoder; Avo Knox Martin
- Cinematography: Michał Dymek
- Edited by: Agnieszka Glińska
- Music by: Frederikke Hoffmeier
- Production companies: Nordisk Film Denmark; Lava Films; Nordisk Film Sweden; Film i Väst; EC1 Łódź; Lower Silesia Film Centre
- Distributed by: Nordisk Film Distribution (Denmark); Gutek Film (Poland); NonStop Entertainment (Sweden)
- Release dates: 15 May 2024 (Cannes); 17 January 2025 (Poland); 23 January 2025 (Denmark)
- Running time: 123 minutes
- Countries: Denmark; Poland; Sweden
- Language: Danish
- Box office: $530,893

The Girl with the Needle (Danish: Pigen med nålen) is a 2024 Gothic historical psychological horror film directed by Magnus von Horn, from a screenplay written by von Horn and Line Langebek. Set in 1919, the film stars Vic Carmen Sonne as a young woman who begins working as a wet nurse at a secretive adoption agency for disadvantaged mothers, but grows suspicious over the woman who runs the operation. It is very loosely based on the true story of Danish serial killer Dagmar Overbye.

The film was selected to compete for the Palme d'Or at the 77th Cannes Film Festival, where it premiered on 15 May 2024 to critical acclaim. It was named one of the top 5 international films of 2024 by the National Board of Review. It was nominated for Best Foreign Language Film at the 82nd Golden Globe Awards and for Best International Feature Film at the 97th Academy Awards.

== Plot ==
Copenhagen, 1919: Karoline is unable to apply for widow's compensation because her husband Peter, who has not written back to her since being deployed, has not been officially declared dead. She is forced to move into squalid conditions, working as a seamstress with her friend Frida at a local factory. Peter, who has been brutally mutilated in battle, returns after Karoline has begun a romantic relationship with her boss Jørgen and fallen pregnant. Karoline, disgusted by Peter and optimistic about a life of better conditions with Jørgen, rejects him, but Jørgen's mother forbids the two to be married.

Alone and without prospects, Karoline attempts a shoddy abortion with a large needle at the local baths but is stopped by a woman called Dagmar and 7-year-old Erena. Dagmar treats Karoline's wounds and instructs her to bring the baby to her sweets shop, where she secretly runs a business finding homes for unwanted babies. Karoline soon discovers Peter working at a local circus, and the two begin living together again. Meanwhile, Peter is besieged with violent psychotic episodes.

Karoline gives birth to a daughter. While Peter wants to keep the baby, sharing he can no longer have any of his own, Karoline takes her to Dagmar's sweets shop. Unable to pay Dagmar's fee, Karoline offers herself up as a wet nurse and begins living at the shop. Karoline settles into her new life, befriending Erena, who she occasionally breastfeeds, and bonding with Dagmar, who seems to share similar feelings of loneliness and guilt. The two women begin recreationally abusing ether together.

Dagmar accepts an abandoned baby boy, who she allows Karoline to care for until he can be found a home. As Karoline enjoys her time with him, Frida remains suspicious of Dagmar's operations. One evening, Erena asks to breastfeed. When Karoline rejects her, committed to breastfeeding the baby boy, Erena attempts to smother him, narrowly stopped by Karoline. The next day, Dagmar takes the baby away, claiming to have found him a family. Concerned this is in retaliation for her treatment of Erena, Karoline follows Dagmar and is horrified to witness her throttling the baby to death before dumping his body in a sewer drain. At the sweets shop, Karoline confronts Dagmar, who admits to killing all the babies she has collected, including Karoline's daughter, claiming she does not want to bring up something so innocent in a cruel world. Dagmar begins heavily dosing Karoline with ether.

Frida, having learned of Dagmar's services from Karoline, attends a friend dropping her unwanted baby off at the shop but grows ever more uneasy when she glimpses a disoriented Karoline. Dagmar tries to convince Karoline to kill the baby and the two brawl, accidentally smothering the baby to death. Later, the woman returns for her baby, regretting giving it up and threatening to call the police if it isn't returned. As Dagmar panics, Karoline jumps out of a window.

Police apprehend Dagmar and send Erena to an orphanage. Karoline, having survived her fall, goes to the traveling circus that Peter now lives with. The two reconcile and Karoline is weaned off of ether with Peter's support. She lies about the fate of her child. Later, Dagmar is tried in court for her crimes, where it is revealed that doctors believe it unlikely that she is young enough to be Erena's biological mother. Dagmar protects Karoline from association and defends her decision to spare the unwanted babies' lives of poverty. Sometime later, Karoline adopts Erena from the orphanage.

== Cast ==
- Vic Carmen Sonne as Karoline
- Trine Dyrholm as Dagmar Overbye
- Besir Zeciri as Peter
- Joachim Fjelstrup as Jørgen
- Tessa Hoder as Frida
- Avo Knox Martin as Erena
- Anders Hove as the Judge
- Ari Alexander as Svendsen
- Benedikte Hansen as Jørgen's mother

== Production ==
The Girl with the Needle is Magnus von Horn's third feature after The Here After (2015) and Sweat (2020). He wrote the screenplay with Line Langebek. It is very loosely based on the true story of Danish serial killer Dagmar Overbye, who manipulated impoverished mothers into leaving their unwanted children in her care, as adoptees, and subsequently murdered them. She was first sentenced to death in 1921, but it was later changed into a lifetime in prison. Overbye remains Denmark's most prolific serial killer. Von Horn described the film as a "fairy tale for grownups" and was motivated "not to just make a straight genre piece [but] to flirt with genre. That became a great lens to look at the story, for me and the cinematographer and the set designers and the costumes." The film was produced by Malene Blenkov for Nordisk Film Denmark and Mariusz Wlodarski for Lava Films (Poland), in co-production with Nordisk Film Sweden.

== Release ==
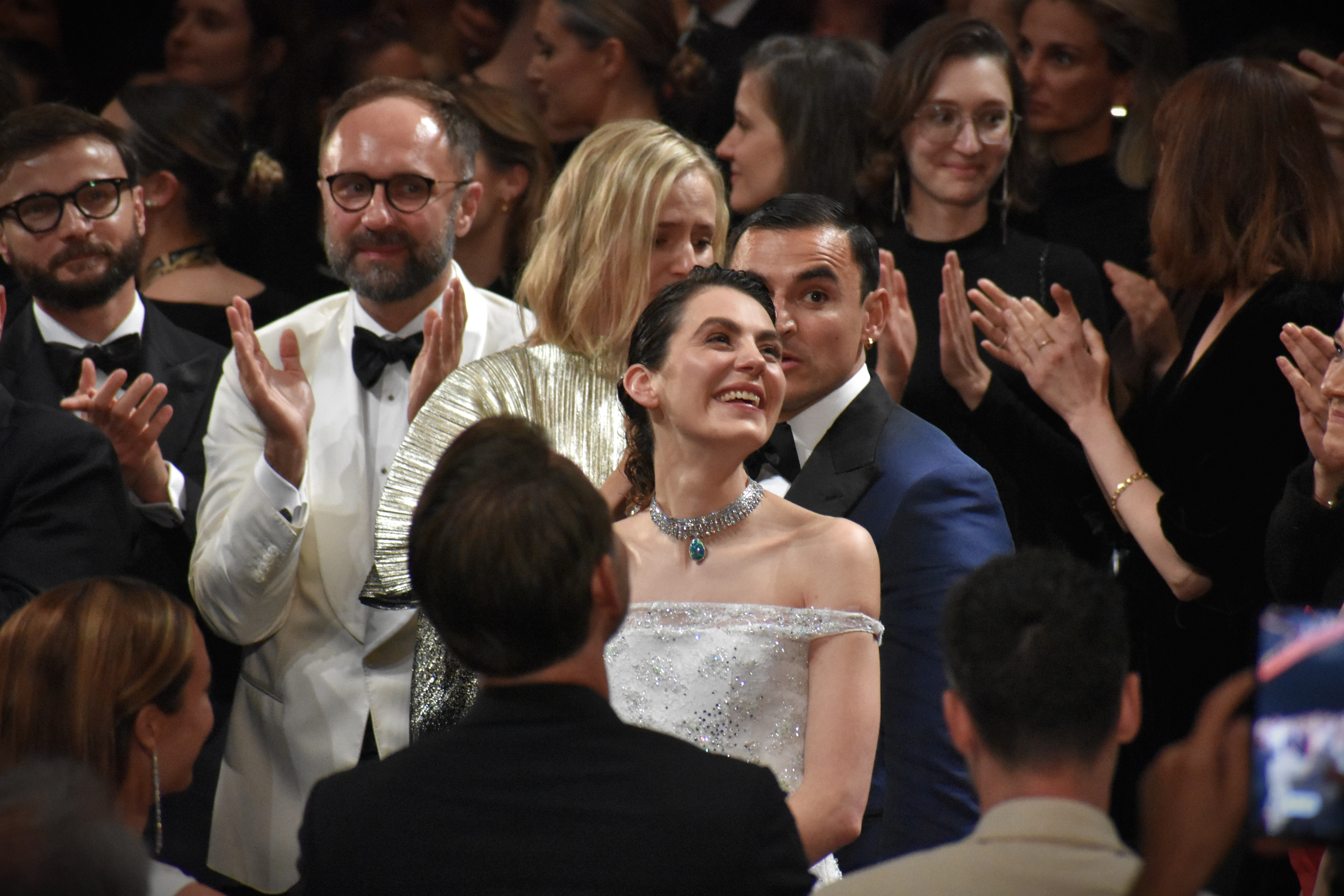
Standing ovation following the world premiere of The Girl with the Needle in Cannes

The Girl with the Needle was selected to compete for the Palme d'Or at the 2024 Cannes Film Festival, where it had its world premiere on 15 May 2024. It made its North American premiere in the Special Presentations section at the 49th Toronto International Film Festival on 5 September 2024. The film has also been selected for the MAMI Mumbai Film Festival 2024, where it will be screened under the World Cinema section.

International sales were handled by The Match Factory, whose parent Mubi acquired distribution rights to the film for North and Latin America, United Kingdom, Ireland, Germany, Austria, Italy, Turkey and India a few days after its premiere. The film premiered in New York and Los Angeles on 6 December 2024. Gutek Film is set to distribute the film in Poland on 17 January 2025, under the title Dziewczyna z igłą. Nordisk Film Distribution is set to release the film in Denmark on 23 January 2025.

The film was supposed to be featured at the 25th European Film Festival held in conjunction with 8th Malaysia International Film Festival in July 2025, but the screening was cancelled a week prior due to 'unforeseen circumstances'.

== Reception ==
=== Critical response ===
On the review aggregator website Rotten Tomatoes, 92% of 111 critics' reviews are positive. The website's consensus reads: "Threading its grim tale through sumptuous black-and-white photography, The Girl with the Needle is a haunting parable made with superb craft." Metacritic, which uses a weighted average, assigned the film a score of 82 out of 100, based on 22 critics, indicating "universal acclaim".

The reviews from Cannes described the film as "grippingly acted"; a "sombre, commercially uncompromising work"; and a "poetic and dark fairy tale".

On 19 September 2024, the film was announced as Denmark's submission for the Academy Award for Best International Feature Film at the 97th Academy Awards, and made the December shortlist, before being nominated for the Academy Award on 23 January 2025.

=== Accolades ===
Award	Date of ceremony	Category	Recipient(s)	Result	Ref.
Academy Awards	2 March 2025	Best International Feature Film	Denmark	Nominated	
Cannes Film Festival	25 May 2024	Palme d'Or	Magnus von Horn	Nominated	
Camerimage	23 November 2024	Golden Frog	Michał Dymek	Won	
European Film Awards	7 December 2024	European Actress	Trine Dyrholm	Nominated	
European Film Awards	7 December 2024	European Actress	Vic Carmen Sonne	Nominated	
European Film Awards	7 December 2024	European Screenwriter	Magnus von Horn and Line Langebek	Nominated	
European Film Awards	7 December 2024	European Production Design	Jagna Dobesz	Won	
European Film Awards	7 December 2024	European Original Score	Frederikke Hoffmeier	Won	
Golden Globe Awards	5 January 2025	Best Motion Picture – Non-English Language	The Girl with the Needle	Nominated	
Golden Trailer Awards	29 May 2025	Best Foreign Independent Trailer	Mubi / Mubi Lab (for "Trailer")	Nominated	
Golden Reel Awards	23 February 2025	Outstanding Achievement in Sound Editing – International Feature	Morten Pilegaard, Oskar Skriver, Christian Roed Dalsgaard, Patrick Ghislain, Julien Naudin	Nominated	
Göteborg Film Festival	1 February 2025	Fipresci Award	The Girl with the Needle	Won	
Goya Awards	28 February 2026	Best European Film	The Girl with the Needle	Nominated	
National Board of Review	7 January 2025	Top Five International Films	The Girl with the Needle	Won	
Polish Film Awards	10 March 2025	Best Film	Magnus von Horn	Won	
Polish Film Awards	10 March 2025	Best Director	Magnus von Horn	Won	
Polish Film Awards	10 March 2025	Best Actress	Vic Carmen Sonne	Won	
Polish Film Awards	10 March 2025	Best Supporting Actress	Trine Dyrholm	Won	
Polish Film Awards	10 March 2025	Best Screenplay	Magnus von Horn and Line Langebek	Won	
Polish Film Awards	10 March 2025	Best Cinematography	Michał Dymek	Won	
Polish Film Awards	10 March 2025	Best Production Design	Jagna Dobesz	Won	
Polish Film Awards	10 March 2025	Best Makeup and Hairstyling	Anne Cathrine Sauerberg	Won	
Polish Film Awards	10 March 2025	Best Costume Design	Małgorzata Fudala	Won	
Polish Film Awards	10 March 2025	Best Film Score	Frederikke Hoffmeier	Won	
Polish Film Awards	10 March 2025	Best Sound	Oskar Skriver	Nominated	
Polish Film Awards	10 March 2025	Best Editing	Agnieszka Glińska	Won	
Polish Film Awards	10 March 2025	Discovery of the Year	Frederikke Hoffmeier (Score)	Nominated	
Polish Film Festival	27 September 2024	Polish Film Abroad Festivals And Reviews Award	Magnus von Horn	Won	
Polish Film Festival	27 September 2024	Young Jury Award	Magnus von Horn	Won	
Polish Film Festival	27 September 2024	Arthouse Cinemas Network Award	Magnus von Horn	Won	
Polish Film Festival	27 September 2024	Journalists Award	Magnus von Horn	Won	
Polish Film Festival	27 September 2024	Best Casting Award	Tanja Grunwald	Won	
Polish Film Festival	28 September 2024	Silver Lions	The Girl with the Needle	Won	
Polish Film Festival	28 September 2024	Best Actress in a Supporting Role	Trine Dyrholm	Won	
Polish Film Festival	28 September 2024	Best Cinematography	Michał Dymek	Won	
Polish Film Festival	28 September 2024	Best Music	Frederikke Hoffmeier	Won	
Polish Film Festival	28 September 2024	Best Art Direction	Jagna Dobesz	Won	
Polish Film Festival	28 September 2024	Best Costume Design	Małgorzata Fudala	Won	
Robert Awards	31 January 2026	Best Danish Film	Malene Blenkov, Mariusz Włodarski, Magnus von Horn, and Line Langebek	Nominated	
Robert Awards	31 January 2026	Best Director	Magnus von Horn	Nominated	
Robert Awards	31 January 2026	Best Original Screenplay	Line Langebek and Magnus von Horn	Nominated	
Robert Awards	31 January 2026	Best Actor in a Leading Role	Besir Zeciri	Won	
Robert Awards	31 January 2026	Best Actress in a Leading Role	Vic Carmen Sonne	Nominated	
Robert Awards	31 January 2026	Best Actor in a Supporting Role	Joachim Fjelstrup	Nominated	
Robert Awards	31 January 2026	Best Actress in a Supporting Role	Trine Dyrholm	Won	
Robert Awards	31 January 2026	Best Production Design	Jagna Dobesz	Won	
Robert Awards	31 January 2026	Best Cinematography	Michał Dymek	Won	
Robert Awards	31 January 2026	Best Costume Design	Małgorzata Fudala	Won	
Robert Awards	31 January 2026	Best Makeup	Anne Cathrine Sauerberg	Won	
Robert Awards	31 January 2026	Best Editing	Agnieszka Glińska	Nominated	
Robert Awards	31 January 2026	Best Sound Design	Oskar Skriver and Morten Pilegaard	Nominated	
Robert Awards	31 January 2026	Best Score	Frederikke Hoffmeier	Won	
Robert Awards	31 January 2026	Best Visual Effects	Peter Hjorth	Won	
San Diego Film Critics Society	9 December 2024	Best Foreign Language Film	The Girl with the Needle	Nominated	
Seville European Film Festival	16 November 2024	Best Direction	Magnus von Horn	Won	
Seville European Film Festival	16 November 2024	Best Actress	Trine Dyrholm	Won	
Seville European Film Festival	16 November 2024	Best Cinematography	Michał Dymek	Won	
Seville European Film Festival	16 November 2024	Best Art Direction	Jagna Dobesz	Won	

== See also ==
- List of submissions to the 97th Academy Awards for Best International Feature Film
- List of Danish submissions for the Academy Award for Best International Feature Film
