= Dagmar Overbye =

Danish serial killer

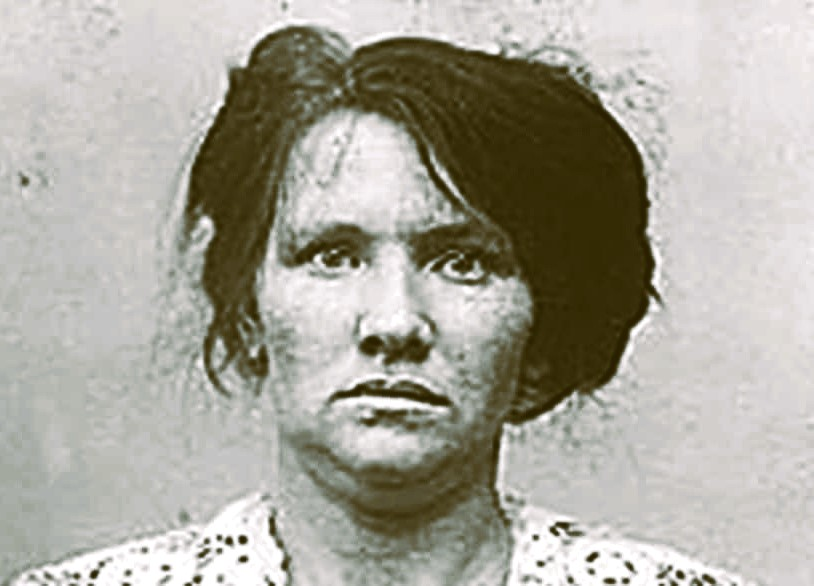
- Born: Dagmar Johanne Amalie Overbye; 23 April 1887; Skanderborg, Denmark
- Died: 6 May 1929 (aged 42); Copenhagen, Denmark
- Children: 3
- Conviction: Murder (9 counts)
- Penalty: Death; commuted to life imprisonment

Details
- Victims: 9–25
- Span of crimes: 1913–1920
- Country: Denmark

Dagmar Johanne Amalie Overbye (Danish: [ˈtɑwmɑ ˈɒwɐˌpyˀ]; 23 April 1887 – 6 May 1929) was a Danish serial killer, who is sometimes known by the nicknames Englemagersken (English: The Angel Maker) and Menneskedyret fra Enghavevej (English: The Human Animal from Enghavevej). She is considered the largest serial killer in Danish history, and her crimes are among the most notorious in Danish criminal history. She murdered between nine and 25 children, including one of her own, during a seven-year period from 1913 to 1920. On 3 March 1921, she was sentenced to death in one of the most noted trials in Danish history—one that changed legislation on childcare. The sentence was later commuted to life in prison.

Overby grew up in poverty in Jutland with a large group of siblings, and her youth was marked by sexual abuse, petty crime, a wandering life as a maid, and turbulent relationships. She gave birth to several children herself, one of whom was abandoned, while others died of illness. After moving to Copenhagen in 1914, she lived at several addresses with her partner, Svend Carl Svendsen, and began taking in infants to subsidize the couple's struggling finances. Under the guise of being a foster mother, Overby would receive children from struggling, often unmarried mothers, in exchange for a lump sum payment or an ongoing care allowance, after which she would murder the children. After killing the children by either suffocation or drowning, she hid the bodies in cemeteries, attics, sewer pipes, and manure pits, or she burned them in the apartment's tiled stove. To cover up the murders, she often presented false death certificates or borrowed other people's children to present them as adopted children to mothers who came to see their children.

The crimes were discovered in September 1920, when a young mother regretted her adoption and reported Overbye to the police. Overbye subsequently made a full confession to the murders, but claimed that they had been committed in despair and under the massive influence of drugs such as naphtha, morphine and cocaine. In an extensive mental statement, however, Professor August Wimmer concluded that she was fully sane and composed, and that she had acted with calm deliberation and cynicism. On 3 March 1921, she was sentenced to death by the Eastern High Court, but the sentence was pardoned the following month by Christian X and Minister of Justice Svenning Rytter and instead changed to life in prison without the possibility of parole. Overbye tried to have the case reopened in 1925, claiming that her partner Svendsen was the real murderer, and she died while serving her sentence in 1929 as a result of failing physical and mental health.

Overbye confessed to a total of 16 infanticides during interrogation, but was convicted of nine murders as there was insufficient proof of the others. Her lawyer based the defense on Overbye being abused herself as a baby, and that her drug use was partly to blame for her actions. The jurors found Overby guilty on all counts, and she became one of the three women sentenced to death in Denmark in the 20th century, but she – like the other two – was reprieved.

She died in prison on 6 May 1929 at the age of 42. Notes relating to her case are included in the Museum of Police History in Nørrebro, Copenhagen.

== In popular culture ==
The Danish author Karen Søndergaard Koldste wrote a novel called Englemagersken (The Angel Maker) based on her. Teatret ved Sorte Hest in Copenhagen has performed a play named Historien om en Mo(r)der (Morder meaning "murderer" and moder meaning "mother") based on her life.

Premiering at Chicago Horror Film Festival in 2024, Peder Pedersen's feature film Englebørn AKA Lost Angels stars Agnes Born as a troubled young artist whose traumas resurface as she hears the sound of crying babies appearing from nowhere; it turns out she is living in one of the apartments where Dagmar Overbye committed her infanticide.

Overbye is a character in the 2024 film The Girl with the Needle, directed by Poland-based Swedish director Magnus von Horn, where she is portrayed by Trine Dyrholm as a candy shopkeeper who quietly advertises she can get babies adopted for a fee, but in fact kills them after their mothers drop them off. The film premiered at the 2024 Cannes Film Festival.

== See also ==
- List of serial killers by country
- List of serial killers by number of victims
