= Magdalena Koleśnik =

Polish actress (born 1990)

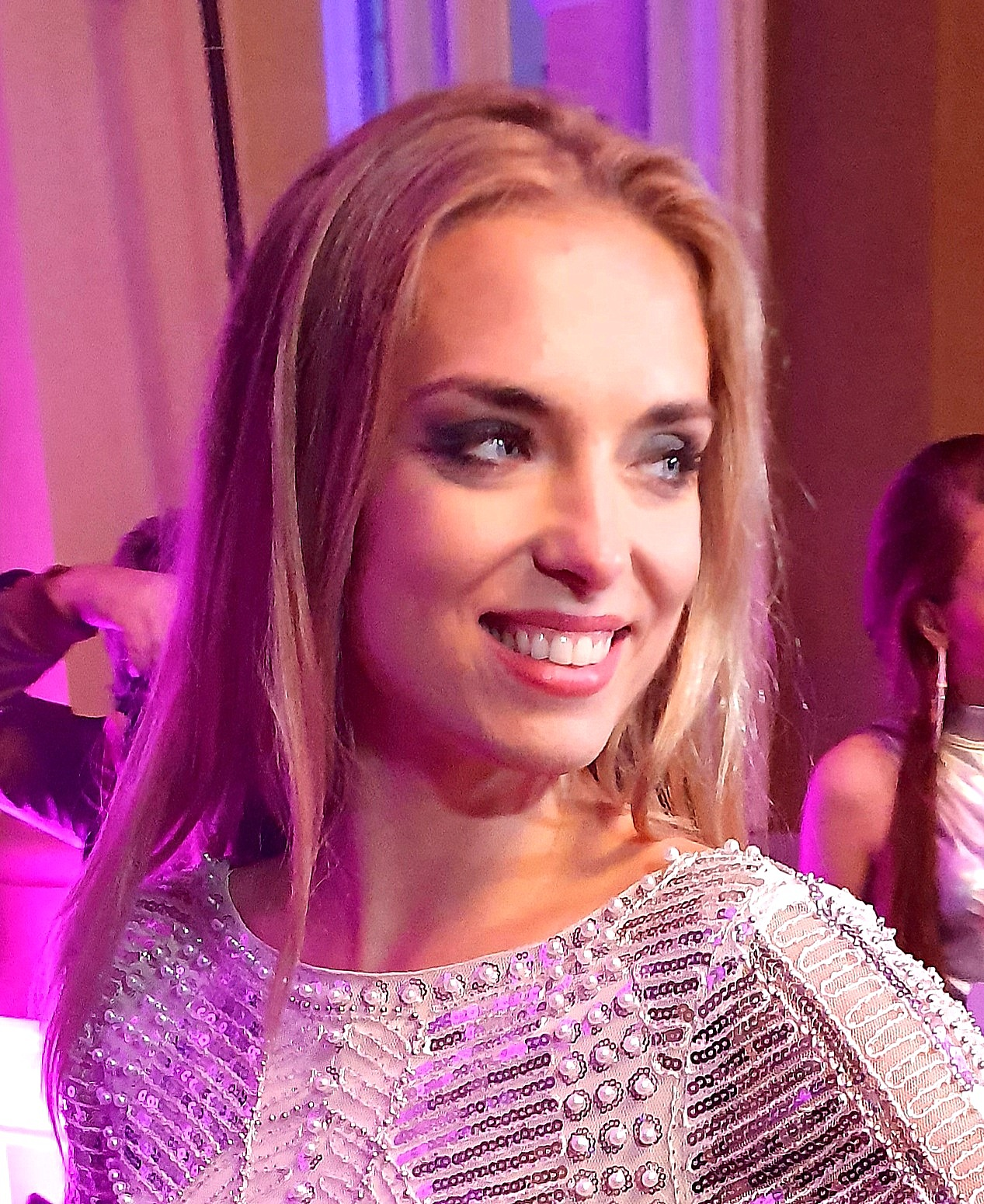
- Koleśnik in 2019
- Born: 27 February 1990 (age 36); Białystok, Podlaskie Voivodeship, Poland
- Occupation: Actress

Magdalena Koleśnik (born 27 February 1990) is a Polish stage, film and television actress.

== Life and career ==
Born in Białystok, Koleśnik studied at the Faculty of Puppetry Arts of the Theatre Academy in her hometown and then at the AST National Academy of Theatre Arts in Kraków, from which she graduated in 2015. She made her stage debut while she was still a student, in 2012, at the Ateneum Theatre in Warsaw. In 2014 she made her film debut, appearing in three films. In 2015 she graduated from the Academy and won the Andrzej Nardelli Award for best new stage actress assigned by the Union of Polish Stage Artists (ZASP) for her performance in the drama Dybbuk at the Warsaw Jewish Theater.

Koleśnik had her breakout in 2020, playing the leading role in Magnus von Horn's Sweat; for her performance she won various awards, including the award for best actress at the Gdynia Film Festival, and the 2021 Zbigniew Cybulski Award, and was nominated for best actress at the 2022 Polish Film Awards.

== Selected filmography ==
- Warsaw 44 (2014)
- Stones for the Rampart (2014)
- Singielka (2016)
- Zabawa, zabawa (2018)
- Brzydula (2020)
- Sweat (2020)
- Klangor (2021)
- Raven (2021)
- Cracow Monsters (2022)
- Gorky Resort (2026)
