= Asthma (rapper) =

Polish rapper

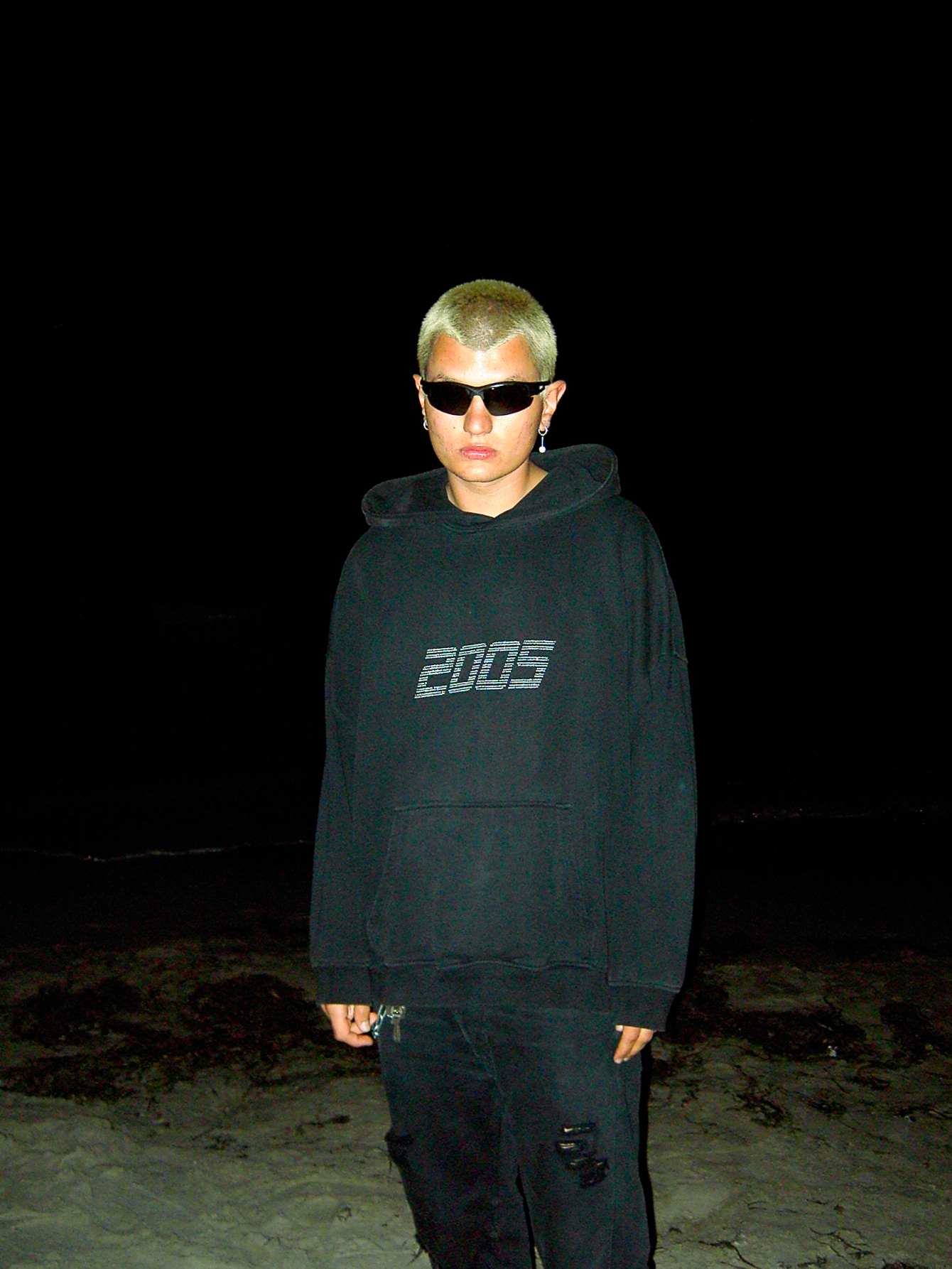
- Asthma in 2023
- Born: Mateusz Wardyński; 28 April 2000 (age 26); Bielsko-Biała, Poland
- Citizenship: Polish
- Occupations: rapper, actor, performer
- Years active: 2020–present

asthma (stage name for Mateusz Wardyński, born 28 April 2000) is a Polish rapper, actor, performer and songwriter.

== Biography ==
Born to a musician father, his musical influences included Nine Inch Nails, Marilyn Manson, Korn, Timbaland, Rihanna, Madonna and Michael Jackson.

In 2022 he gave live performances at the Off Festival and Męskie Granie tour, and performed as the opening act to the Denzel Curry performance.

== Discography ==
=== Studio albums ===
- manifest (2021), with Młody
- nowe życie (2023)
- ASTHMA (2025), produced by Wuja HZG, SHDØW, Kuba Karaś and Kuba Więcek

=== Extended plays ===
- all is love (2020)
- żyleta live (2023)

=== Singles (selected) ===
- „centrala” (2020)
- „charakterystyka bloku” (2020)
- „generation of the end” (2020)
- „reset (BEZ BIITU)” (2021)
- „się zmieniło trochę” (2022)
- „peto” (2022)
- „żyleta” (2023)
- „RUN UP” (2023)

== Concert tours ==
- 2021: manifest tour 2021
- 2022: manifest tour 2022
- 2023: nowe życie tour

== Filmography ==
- Belfer as Kuba (TV series, 2023)

== Awards ==
- Lech Polish Hip-Hop Music Awards for the discovery of the year (2021)
- Popkillery nomination for the discovery of the year (2021)
