= The Teacher (2016 TV series) =

Polish crime drama television series

- Starring: Maciej Stuhr; Katarzyna Dąbrowska; Paulina Szostak
- Country of origin: Poland
- Original language: Polish
- No. of series: 3
- No. of episodes: 26

Production
- Running time: 55 minutes

Original release
- Network: Canal+
- Release: 2 October 2016 – 10 December 2017
- Release: 8 September 2023 – present

The Teacher (Polish: Belfer), also known as The Teach, is a Polish television crime drama series, which began screening from 2 October 2016. It stars Maciej Stuhr as Paweł, a high school teacher, who investigates criminal cases. Katarzyna Dąbrowska portrays Marta, another teacher and some-time love interest. Paulina Szostak appears as a student, Ewelina, in two seasons. The first season of ten episodes was a rating success for Canal + as it broke their all-time record and won two awards, including Best TV Series at the Polish Film Awards. A second season of eight episodes began in October 2017. After a gap of six years, a third season of eight episodes was broadcast from September 2023.

== Plot ==
In late August 2016 Paweł, a high school Polish teacher, transfers from a Warsaw private school to Dobrowice. He investigates the recent murder of a school student, Asia who was his unacknowledged daughter. Marta becomes his lover and eventually pregnant. Paweł encounters local police corruption and criminal activity by both the social hierarchy and students. He meets aspiring journalist Ewelina. After that case is resolved in 2017, Paweł is coerced by inspector Radosław to go undercover at a Wrocław private school, where three students (Iwo, Magda, Tymek) disappeared before Paweł arrived. Polish intelligence officer, Karol, trained them as spies. Iwo kills and injures people at the school. Paweł uses Ewelina as his informant and helps find doomsday preppers, who are planning terrorist activities. Karol kills Ewelina to hide his connection with Iwo. Tymek hacks police files, kills Radosław. Magda kills Karol to prevent his escaping justice. Paweł refuses to work for Polish intelligence agents. Five years later, in August 2022, Paweł is released from jail without conviction. He returns to Małomorze as a teacher. Paweł reconnects with Bogdan, who runs cruises using local school students as crew members. Paweł finds out about Kacper's mid-voyage disappearance, which is investigated by local police officer Ewa. Her daughter Ada is Kacper's friend. Kacper's father Waldemar is corrupt. His confederates Olaf and Robert join his schemes. They are protected by Ewa's boss Zbyszek. Paweł and Ewa also separately investigates the death of Waldemar's warehouseman Iwan. Paweł's determination escalates when Bogdan dies, officially by drowning while drunk. Paweł meets Marta again and asks to see their daughter Milena.

== Cast ==
- Maciej Stuhr as Paweł Zawadzki: secondary school Polish teacher, former juvenile psychologist. Investigates criminal cases both assisting police and acting on his own. Returns to Dobrowice when Asia's murdered. Biological father of Asia and Milena, becomes Katarzyna's lover, then Marta's lover. Blackmailed by Radosław into becoming undercover teacher at a Wrocław private school. After being accused of espionage, he is released without conviction. Returns to port city of Małomorze and lives with Bogdan.
- Katarzyna Dąbrowska: Marta Mirska: Dobrowice high school class teacher, Paweł's lover who becomes pregnant. Follows Paweł to Wrocław but their relationship ends. Milena's mother.
- Paulina Szostak as Ewelina Rozłucka: Dobrowice student, Asia's friend, becomes Maciek's lover. Later poses as Weronika/"Wera" to assist Paweł in Wrocław
- Szymon Piotr Warszawski as Radosław Kędzierski: Central Bureau of Investigation (CBŚ) inspector, coerces Paweł to work as informer
- Piotr Głowacki as Rafał Papiński: Dobrowice police officer, Sławomir's second-in-charge. Later promoted to Commander
- Helena Sujecka as Maria Zimmer: Dobrowice police officer. Later becomes Rafał's assistant

=== Season one only ===
- Magdalena Cielecka as Katarzyna Molenda: head of Dobrowice foundation for youths, Julka and Jasiek's mother
- Grzegorz Damięcki as Grzegorz Molenda: prominent Dobrowice businessman, Julka, Jasiek and Sebastian's father
- Paweł Królikowski as Sławomir Słota: Dobrowice Police Commander
- Sebastian Fabijański as Adrian Kuś: works for Grzegorz, Julka's lover, supplies drugs to dealers, supports his 6-year-old brother despite their inept mother
- Józef Pawłowski as Maciej Dąbrowa: student, Asia's boyfriend, briefly becomes Ewelina's lover
- Krzysztof Pieczyński: Lesław Dobrzański: Dobrowice Voice newspaper editor-reporter, Ewelina's uncle
- Łukasz Simlat as Daniel Poręba: PE teacher, leers at female students
- Mateusz Więcławek: Jasiek Molenda: student, Julka's twin brother, abrasive bully, becomes drug dealer
- Joachim Lamża as Ryszard Kumiński: local meatworks and supermarket owner, disposes of wastes by dumping in forest, partner in Grzegorz' schemes
- Aleksandra Popławska as Ewa Walewska: Asia's mother, Paweł's former lover
- Cezary Łukaszewicz as Sebastian Molenda: Grzegorz' first son, works for Grzegorz
- Aleksandra Grabowska as Julka Molenda: student, Jasiek's twin sister, Adrian's lover
- Katarzyna Sawczuk as Asia/Joanna Walewska: student, Maciej's girlfriend, murder victim
- Malwina Buss as Jowita Wójcik: student, composed threatening letters to Asia
- Michalina Rodak as Daria Sadurska: student, coached by Daniel
- Piotr Kruszewski as "Yogi": student, bully, Jasiek's stooge
- Matt Malecki as Bujak: student, "Yogi"'s friend
- Jakub Zając as Krystian Wróblewski: student, Maciej's friend
- Robert Gonera as Bogdan Walewski: Ewa's husband, Asia's father (later learns of Ewa's affair with Paweł)
- Patryk Pniewski as Łukasz Tarczyński: student, drug dealer working for Adrian
- Sandra Drzymalska as Ola Kaczmarek: student, Ewelina's friend
- Maciej Charyton as Jakub "Kuba" Wróblewski: autistic and epileptic student, Krystian's older brother
- Przemyslaw Bluszcz as Jacek Dabrowa: Maciej's father, hunter
- Beata Kawka as Grazyna Rozlucka: runs local bar, Ewelina's mother
- Katarzyna Kwiatkowska as Olga Wróblewska: Krystian and Jakub's mother, Krysia's friend
- Robert Czebotar as Mikolaj Wróblewski: Krystian and Jakub's father
- Zbigniew Konopka as "Principal": high school principal, Paweł's boss
- Tomasz Dedek as Zbigniew Tarczynski: Łukasz' father, local doctor
- Andrzej Konopka as Przybylski: mayor, partner in Grzegorz' schemes
- Wojciech Czerwinski as "Shrek"/Szrek: Adrian's henchman, Ryszard's meat worker
- Kamil Mroz as Kijana: Adrian's henchman, Ryszard's meat worker
- Robert Wabich as Baniocha: police desk constable
- Magdalena Czerwińska as Anna Bednarz: Elbląg-based prosecutor, unimpressed with Dobrowice police's work on Asia and Maciek's cases, calls in Radosław
- Ewa Kolasińska as Krysia/Krystyna: Paweł's aunt, retired dentist, Paweł boarded with her until fire, she stays with Walewski family
- Dariusz Toczek as Cezary: history teacher
- Jan Aleksandrowicz-Krasko as Jurij Kolonienko: Russian criminal, Adrian's contact in Kaliningrad
- Andrzej Deskur as Kamil: Warsaw-based journalist, interviews Ewelina

=== Season two only ===
- Michalina Łabacz as Magda Reiss: Wrocław private school student, one of three who went missing, slightly injured during shootings; actually an undercover intelligence agent trained by Karol, also poses as "Hallucination" Lucjan's prostitute/girlfriend
- Eliza Rycembel as Luiza Dlugosz: student, Magda's friend, Patryk's girlfriend, vlogger
- Dariusz Starczewski as Karol Ebig: biology teacher, also directs school production of Balladyna, injured during shootings. Actually an intelligence officer training students as spies.
- Bartosz Sak as Slawek Godlewski: student, given Balladyna's lead male role after Iwo went missing
- Stanisław Linowski as Tymon "Tymek" Karski: student, Magda's boyfriend, one of three who went missing; talented hacker, becomes Luiza's boyfriend, starts delving into Paweł's past, works as Karol's intelligence spy with Magda
- Aleksandra Konieczna as Maria Zaborska: high school principal, aware of Paweł's undercover status
- Mirosław Haniszewski as Ryszard Kowalczyk: CBŚ inspector, Radosław's superior
- Damian Kret as Iwo Drawicz: student, one of three who went missing; trained by Karol to spy on Tati's doomsday preppers; goes rogue shoots and kills two people, injures others; killed by police
- Jakub Gąsowski as Szymon Strzelecki: student, assists Karol with Balladyna
- Adrian Zaremba as Patryk Dobosz: student, Luisa's boyfriend, poses as "Gudrun" to smear Karol
- Joanna Niemirska as Agata Ebig: doctor, Karol's wife
- Krystian Pesta as Borys: CBŚ officer, works for Radosław
- Philippe Tłokiński as Orzechowski: CBŚ Commissioner, Radosław former rival, takes over Radosław's supervision
- Milena Staszuk as Jaga Bienkowska: student, escapes from Iwo
- Mariusz Słupiński as Marek Reiss: Magda's father, car repairer
- Radosław Krzyżowski as Marcin Karski: Tymek's father
- Aleksandra Domańska as Dorota: CBŚ officer, works for Radosław
- Krzysztof Franieczek as Lucjan/Lucek: former mercenary, arms dealer, "Hallucination"'s boyfriend/pimp
- Dariusz Biskupski as Tadeusz "Tati" Tkaczyk: furniture factory owner, former mercenary, doomsday prepper's leader, buys weaponry from Lucjan
- Marcin Kobierski as Krzysztof: CBŚ officer, works for Radosław
- Zofia Wichłacz as Karolina Gontarska: student, Iwo's ex-girlfriend, portrayed title role of Balladyna
- Filip Warot as Tomasz "Pablo" Tkaczyk: doomsday prepper, Tati's son
- Emilia Dankwa as Natalia Ebig: Karol's daughter
- Mikolaj Zielinski as Tytus Ebig: Karol's son
- Marek Kasprzyk as Rafal Gontarski: Karolina's father
- Joanna Sydor as Aneta Gontarska: Karolina's mother
- Pawel Aksamit as Draco: CBŚ officer, works for Radosław

=== Season three only ===
- Roma Gąsiorowska as Ewa Krawiec: Małomorze Police Commissioner, Paweł's former lover, Zbyszek's sometime lover
- Jacek Koman as Bogdan Zawadzki: Paweł's father, sailing ship captain, historically jailed for amber smuggling
- Wiktoria Kruszczyńska as Ada Krawiec: Ewa's daughter, student, Kacper's friend, Bartek's girlfriend
- Michał Zieliński as Kacper Krynicki: Waldemar's son, student, Ada's friend, missing presumed drowned
- Mirosław Baka as Waldemar Krynicki: Basia's husband, Kacper's father: major businessman, organizes clandestine activities
- Katarzyna Herman as Basia/Barbara Krynicka: Waldemar's wife, Kacper's mother, Bogdan's former lover
- Marek Kalita as Zbigniew/Zbyszek Molak: Police Superintendent, Ewa's boss and sometime lover, corrupted by Waldemar
- Hubert Miłkowski as Bartek: student, Ada's boyfriend
- Kamil Pudlik as Igor Podolak: student, Kinga's boyfriend
- Radoslaw Drozdz as Sebastian Druzbacki: police officer, Ewa's subordinate
- Karolina Kowalska as Kinga Świtaj: student, Igor's girlfriend
- Jan Jankowski as Robert Świtaj: Kinga's father, Waldemar's confederate
- Mateusz Wardyński as Kuba: student, capable rapper-poet
- Cezary Kolacz as Jaroslaw Nowak: uniform police officer
- Roman Gancarczyk as Olaf Podolak: Igor's father, owns car and truck transport company (Podolex), Waldermar's confederate
- Maciej Miszczak as Aleksander Butryś: Waldemar's henchman
- Ireneusz Koziol as Leszek Maran: youth training center director, Bogdan's friend
- Przemyslaw Kozlowski as Stefan Wyganski: geography teacher, part-time reporter
- Radosław Drożdż as Sebastian Drużbacki: police officer
- Agata Kulesza as Roztocka: pathologist
- Mykola Panasiuk as Iwan/Ivan Mylko: Ukrainian former thief, Waldemar's warehouse worker, Kacper's love interest; murdered in warehouse
- Matylda Paszczenko as Sliwinska: Małomorze Prosecutor
- Oskar Stoczynski as Marcin Szczerba: Waldemar's warehouse worker
- Rafal Kwietniewski as Tomek Zawislak: Bogdan's friend, fishing boat captain
- Jan Jurewicz as Stopka: Bogdan's neighbor, retired vessel traffic controller

== Production ==
Season one was directed by Łukasz Palkowski and based on a script by Jakub Żulczyk and Monika Powalisz. Filming began in July 2015 using sites in Chełmża, which doubles for Dobrowice; as well as Kwidzyn, Chełmno, Warsaw, Wilanów, Kampinos National Park and Lake Zegrzyńskie.

Season 2, consisting of eight episodes, premiered on 22 October 2017. Krzysztof Łukaszewicz and Maciej Bochniak directed the second series, with scripts written by Żulczyk, Powalisz and Bartłomiej Ignaciuk. It was filmed from April to July 2017 in Wrocław, Warsaw and Wałbrzych.

Director of the third season of eight episodes is Łukasz Grzegorzek while scripts were written by Żulczyk, Powalisz, Kacper Wysocki, Liliana Pomykalska and Przemysław Nowakowski. The scenes were recorded in 2022, in Łódź, Tuszyn, Pabianice, Zgierz, Ustka and on the STS Kapitan Borchardt sailing ship.

== Reception ==
The first season was a rating success for Canal+ breaking its all-time best viewing figures, with an average audience rating of 345,000 and over 461,000 viewers watching the finale on 27 November 2016.

It was awarded the Special Prize at Telekamera 2017 and Best TV Series at the 2017 Polish Film Awards.

== Releases ==
The first season was released on DVD on 17 March 2017.

== Episodes ==
=== Season one ===
No. overall	No. in season	Title	Directed by	Written by	Original release date
1	1	"Episode 1" (Odcinek 1)	Łukasz Palkowski	Jakub Żulczyk, Monika Powalisz	2 October 2016
Jakob, Kyrstian and Maciek find Asia's corpse in the forest. Sławomir and Rafał attend; Asia's purse has 4000 złoty, empty pill bottle but no phone. Krystian to police: Asia was Maciek's girlfriend. Wróblewskis collect their sons and Maciek; they inform Jacek. Sławomir drinks at Grazyna's bar; Ewelina learns Asia's dead. Ewelina weeps to Ola. Bogdan did not know Asia had psychotropics or so much money. Ewa faints. Paweł meets Daniel and "Principal". Police have not found Asia's phone. Paweł enters Krysia's home. Rafał and Maria detain Paweł while searching Asia's site; he's released after identity confirmed. Paweł suggest police question students at school. Paweł and Daniel share drinks when Lesław recognizes Paweł. Daniel ignores drunken Lesław. Paweł interrupts Jasiek bullying Jakob. Paweł meets fellow staff; then the Molendas. Students discuss why Maciek attacked Łukasz during assembly. Paweł introduced to his class as Marta arrives for their lesson. Grzegorz discusses Swedish business interested in buying local properties. Ewelina leaves with Maciek. Paweł tells Lesław: no vomit where Asia found. Pathologist determines Asia died of ruptured spleen from a severe blow – not suicide. Jasiek tries baiting Paweł but his efforts are defused. Maciek reads out his thoughts on Asia. Police find threatening letters in Asia's locker.
2	2	"Episode 2" (Odcinek 2)	Łukasz Palkowski	Jakub Żulczyk, Monika Powalisz	2 October 2016
Asia stumbles in forest, slumps against tree trunk; she has her phone. Marta argues against police questioning students unsupervised; Paweł to sit in as psychologist. Adrian and henchmen supply drugs to Łukasz. Rafał and Maria meet Marta, Paweł and "Principal". Students tell police Asia was unpopular. Zbigniew arrives; stops Łukasz' questioning. Katarzyna organizes sportsground purchase. Grzegorz, Ryszard and Przybylski gloat about cheaply acquiring sportsground. Ryszard angered as part of his zone reclassified: nature reserve. Ewelina tells Paweł: students afraid to talk. Students recall Maciek jealous over Asia and had tantrums. At police station, Sławomir accuses Maciek of impregnating Asia then killing her when she would not abort their baby. Ewelina tells panel they should question perverts. Daniel leers at basketball players. Lesław to Paweł: Asia killed and pregnant. Lesław: town's businessmen protect killer. Maciek leaves home at night. Paweł, Marta and students attend Asia's funeral. Grzegorz orders Sławomir: close investigation. Ola scolds Daniel for attending funeral. Sławomir interviews Szrek and Kijana; Adrian provides alibis. Ewa and Paweł discuss Asia: she's not Bogdan's daughter. Paweł, Rafał and Ewelina find Maciek inside hut. Marta confronts Jowita over letters. Jowita provides locket: Asia's initials and "D". Maciek shows flowers left by Asia's lover.
3	3	"Episode 3" (Odcinek 3)	Łukasz Palkowski	Jakub Żulczyk, Monika Powalisz	9 October 2016
Police arrest Daniel at school. "Principal" to staff: will dismiss Daniel, Marta protests: what if Daniel's innocent? Łukasz hands cash to Adrian. Sławomir questions Daniel. Marta: police arrested Daniel because of bracelet. Daniel's alibi: working as stripper but no witness confirms. Paweł answers Daniel's phone, someone asks about hairdresser. Daniel refuses to confess. Paweł meets Adrian. Katarzyna invites Paweł to party. Grzegorz agrees to swindle Swedes by selling sportsground to Ryszard. Prisoner "Pigeon" brutalizes Daniel. Marta asks Paweł to supervise students' party: he has another meeting, first. After seeing Daniel's injuries, Rafał confronts Sławomir but he's ordered not to interfere. Rafał warns Paweł that Daniel needs help. Paweł confronts hairdresser's boyfriend about Daniel's alibi. Julka tells Grzegorz she's partying tonight then staying at Daria's. Party begins, "Yogi" fails to smuggle in alcohol. Łukasz already hid drugs at venue. Łukasz enlists "Yogi" to sell his drugs. Paweł goes to Katarzyna's, meets Sebastian. Łukasz and Jowita have sex. Paweł sees Sebastian's flowers same as Asia's lover's gift. Łukasz asks Jowita to sell drugs for him. Hairdresser provides Daniel's alibi. Paweł and Marta prevent Julka leaving party with Adrian. Maciek gets call from Asia's phone; he sees Jakob with Asia's phone.
4	4	"Episode 4" (Odcinek 4)	Łukasz Palkowski	Jakub Żulczyk, Monika Powalisz	16 October 2016
Maciek views Asia's video filmed by Sebastian. Daniel leaves school to work for Sebastian. Ewelina and Krystian see rotting meat dump. Sławomir, Grzegorz, Ryszard and Sebastian discuss meat dumps, sportsground and Paweł helping Katarzyna. Katarzyna fobbed off from seeing Przybylski. Jasiek asks Kijana for work. Lesław to Paweł: Sebastian arrived year ago, hired Asia as waitress. Lesław: Sebastian protected by Grzegorz. Grzegorz bullies Katarzyna over sportsground. Szrek and Kijana attack Paweł; he fights them off. Katarzyna tends Paweł's wounds; they kiss. Maciek steals Jacek's pistol. Kijana lures Jasiek into Kaliningrad; abandons him with Jurij's gang. Ewelina asks Lesław to publish meat dumps: he requires photographic evidence. Paweł borrows Lesław's car. Jurij forces Jasiek to undress; tie him to tree. Ewelina cannot convince Maciek to help find dumps. Paweł tails Sebastian to nightclub; Sebastian meets gay lover. Jasiek escapes; phones Bujak for help. Jacek loans Ewelina forest maps. Daniel sees Maciek with Sabastian. Paweł's gets Daniel another job. Ewelina and Jacek look for Maciek. Daniel overhears Ewelina's call to Paweł about Maciek. Daniel: Maciek went with Sebastian. Maciek holds pistol to Sebastian's head: blamed for Asia's murder. Paweł approaches, convinces Maciek not to shoot Sebastian. Maciek tries to kill himself.
5	5	"Episode 5" (Odcinek 5)	Łukasz Palkowski	Jakub Żulczyk, Monika Powalisz	23 October 2016
Ewelina hugs Jacek, doctor tells them that Maciek is critical. Jacek gave Asia's phone to Sławomir. Sławomir wants to charge Maciek with attempted murder. Jacek: Maceik tried to kill himself. Paweł to Sławomir: Jacek asked for help; Sebastian saw Maciek enter forest. Anna arrives, collects Asia's phone; orders police to conduct paternity tests on Sebastian, Jasiek and Grzegorz. Paweł and Katarzyna have sex. Grzegorz threatens Jacek about Maciek. Jowita speculates Maciek wanted to kill Sebastian because of Asia's pregnancy. Julka tells off Jowita. Paweł settles class down. Grzegorz asks Paweł to meeting. Sławomir has Jacek lie about weapon. Marta studies sportsground proposal: map missing. Grzegorz introduces Paweł to his partners. They ask Paweł to manage cultural center. While Grzegorz promises Marta, Paweł sees Grzegorz destroy map. Adrian and gang ignore Jasiek's efforts to recover stolen goods. Jasiek threatens to tell Grzegorz about Adrian being Julka's lover. Zbigniew asks Paweł to run Asia's scholarship. Paweł updates Lesław on meeting town's powerbrokers. Ewelina to Paweł: Asia talked of Barcelona after graduation. Sławomir supervises Zbigniew running paternity tests. Katarzyna describes scholarship, Ewa's initially resistant. Grzegorz: Asia planned to study in Barcelona. Paweł searches Grzegorz' lodge. Sławomir diverts constable while Grzegorz swaps blood sample.
6	6	"Episode 6" (Odcinek 6)	Łukasz Palkowski	Jakub Żulczyk, Monika Powalisz	30 October 2016
Krysia's home set alight; she's unharmed. Paweł and Rafał view destruction. Ewa does not want scholarship. Ewelina and Krystian photograph Ryszard's workers dumping meat. Jasiek notices Grzegorz' Beretta in car's boot. Adrian gives his brother an emergency use phone. Jowita sells drugs. Grzegorz lies to Marta: historical map not needed. Marta will translate for Swedish investors. Paweł castigates students for poor tests. Jasiek asks Łukasz for drugs. Łukasz: wait until Adrian returns. Grzegorz commiserates with Paweł about fire. Paweł wants Lesław help to jail Grzegorz. Paweł stays at Marta's. Ewelina organizes protest against Ryszard's meat dump. Paweł ends affair with Katarzyna. Ryszard threatens Lesław: expose drunk-driving incident. Ewelina and Krystian ask Cezary to find Nazi German bunkers. Paweł and Lesław approach Anna about Grzegorz. She requires more evidence; Grzegorz' DNA does not match Asia's foetus. Grzegorz gloats about fooling Anna and Swedes. Ryszard laughs: site maps do not match. Paweł asks Anna to check Grzegorz with sons' DNA. National police arrest Grzegorz at home; Jasiek hides Beretta. Adrian supervises loading Grzegorz' truck. Adrian shoots Kijana. Ewelina and Krystian find waste barrels using Cezary's metal detector. Paweł to Ewa: Grzegorz arrested for Asia's murder. Ewa: knew about Asia's pregnancy; Grzegorz was at Ewa's.
7	7	"Episode 7" (Odcinek 7)	Łukasz Palkowski	Jakub Żulczyk, Monika Powalisz	6 November 2016
Asia leaves Grzegorz; takes money. Ewa alibis Grzegorz. Adrian falsifies scene; phones Jasiek: truck stolen. Ewelina posts toxic barrel photos on website. Jasiek asks Zbigniew: treat Kijana. Bogdan to Paweł: stop interfering; you were sperm donor. Adrian lies to Jasiek regarding theft. Jasiek shows Adrian's bullet to Grzegorz: Adrian conned Grzegorz. Students view toxic barrels website. Anna accuses Sławomir of evidence tampering: catch Asia's killer or resign. Zbigniew confirms Kijana shot at close range. Sławomir to Grzegorz: frame Adrian for Asia's murder. Paweł asks Ola to enter competition. Grzegorz discovers Adrian and Julka having sex. Rafał removed from Asia case. Sławomir blackmails Szrek and Kijana: testify that Adrian killed Asia. Lesław tells Ewelina not to publicize toxic barrels. Grzegorz: Adrian killed Asia; Julka confined to bedroom. Lesław to Paweł: powerbrokers hid drunk driving, incapacitating girl. Jasiek tells Julka: Adrian arrested. Julka climbs out window. Baniocha and Sławomir steal Adrian's money. Paweł and Marta determine powerbrokers swapped sites on maps. Julka to Paweł: Adrian innocent; met Jurij in Kaliningrad. Paweł updates Rafał: going to Jurij. Adrian jailed with two thugs. Kamil to Ewelina: fact-checking required. Jurij captures Paweł. Adrian disables thugs; escapes custody. Jurij tells Paweł: only Adrian visited.
8	8	"Episode 8" (Odcinek 8)	Łukasz Palkowski	Jakub Żulczyk, Monika Powalisz	13 November 2016
Adrian phones Jurij: let Paweł go. Maciek wakes from coma. Paweł and Lesław look for Szrek and Kijana. Radosław disdains Sławomir's ineptness. Paweł and class visit Maciek. Jasiek says Julka is ill. Grzegorz banishes Julka to locked study. "Principal" berates Paweł for irregular behaviour. Paweł: any investigation would uncover school's dubious finances. Police trick Adrian's brother into phoning. Ola's given drugs by Jowita. Adrian asks Paweł: help his brother. Paweł: henchmen know about Asia's murder. Swedes start land negotiations. Paweł advises Rafał: check border CCTV for Adrian. Rafał hands-over henchmen's statements. Lesław to Ryszard: website photos will go. Ryszard tells Lesław where henchmen hide. Lesław to Kamil: Ewelina's photos not from Poland. Paweł and Adrian kidnap henchmen. Ewelina rails at Lesław for lying to Kamil. Adrian takes henchmen to Ryszard's meatworks. Szrek and Kijana admit to hitting Asia; they will talk to Adrian, alone. Paweł leaves room; henchmen are shot dead. Adrian claims they killed Asia. Swedes will not sign, yet. Marta translates for powerbrokers. Adrian breaks door, asks Julka to wait for him. Jasiek alerts Grzegorz. Adrian collects money cache. Paweł phones Adrian – no answer. Adrian and police shoot. Injured, Adrian escapes but crashes. Jasiek kills Adrian, takes money.
9	9	"Episode 9" (Odcinek 9)	Łukasz Palkowski	Jakub Żulczyk, Monika Powalisz	20 November 2016
Both Paweł and Jasiek get rid of evidence. Sławomir tells Radosław how he killed Adrian. Paweł asks Lesław to find where Asia was bashed. Grzegorz congratulates Sławomir for killing Adrian. Krystian asks Ewelina about barrels but she's meeting Maciek. Ryszard finds dead henchmen; deduces Lesław's involvement. Lesław warns Krystian not to pursue barrels story. Radosław wants Paweł's cooperation in Asia's case. Jasiek buys drugs from "Pigeon". At meatworks, Sławomir found no gun; shells being examined. Lesław follows Jakub to Asia's bash site; later Lesław shows Paweł. Paweł observes meat hooks where Asia was restrained. Krystian and Ewelina argue over blog's deletion. Marta overhears Paweł inform Radosław of bash site. Ryszard and men threaten Lesław. Paweł tells Radosław: another person cut Asia's hair. Lesław sends his files to Warsaw newspaper. Julka points gun at Grzegorz before leaving home. Jusiek has Jowita sell his drugs. Paweł finds Lesław's hanged himself. Ewa thanks Paweł for finding Asia's killers. Ewelina prevents Jowita selling drugs to Ola. Swedes delay signing land deal. Pathologist to Radosław: Adrian shot by a Beretta – local police use Walthers. Paweł films students' taking dictation. Ryszard reads newspaper reporting toxic barrels. Paweł and Marta note Julka's reaction to Paweł's dictation.
10	10	"Episode 10" (Odcinek 10)	Łukasz Palkowski	Jakub Żulczyk, Monika Powalisz	27 November 2016
After seeing Julka's reaction, Radosław investigates further. Swedes end negotiations. Maciek leaves hospital. Marta concerned by Ola's personality changes. Paweł: should we test Ola for drugs? Ewelina: Ola no longer takes drugs. Maciek and Ewelina help Ola study. Łukasz slips drugs into Ola's notebook. Powerbrokers squabble amongst themselves. Radosław and Rafał interrupt meeting to search Grzegorz' house. Radosław dismisses Sławomir. Kamil asks Ewelina to help write Lesław's backstory. Ola appears confident entering test but collapses. Radosław collects Grzegorz' Beretta. Ewelina tells Radosław that Lesław's suicide provoked by Ryszard's threats. Radosław requires tangible evidence. Ola's mother castigates Paweł. Radosław arrests Julka for Adrian's murder: fingerprints on Beretta. "Principal" suspends Paweł over Ola's drug taking. Grzegorz thrashes Jasiek in front of associates. Julka refuses help from parents. Grzegorz asks Paweł to help Julka. Paweł tells Julka: confess to Asia's bashing. Julka's motive: Asia told Grzegorz about Adrian. Krystian observes Asia bashed at Julka's behest. Grzegorz to Paweł: Asia never informed on Julka. Ewelina and Maciek have sex. Paweł confronts Ewelina about rumour mongering; Ewelina scoffs. Police arrest Jasiek. Paweł leaves town; asks Marta to visit. Fellow students shun Ewelina; Julka divulged that Ewelina spread rumours. Radosław has Adrian's phone containing Paweł's nickname.

=== Season two ===
No. overall	No. in season	Title	Directed by	Written by	Original release date
11	1	"Episode 1" (Odcinek 1)	Krzysztof Lukaszewicz	Jakub Żulczyk, Monika Powalisz	22 October 2017
Paweł observes students socialising. Magda kisses Tymek. Paweł asks Maria about missing students, which include Magda and Tymek. Maria: they overstayed in Paris. Iwo contacted school; recently dumped by Karolina. Maria asks Paweł to assist Karol's school production, Balladyna. Paweł interrupts rehearsal; meets Magda and Szymon. Tymek hacks into computers. Paweł sees Iwo lurking. Maria meets students' parents. Paweł to Radosław: all three are back. Radosław: find out where they really went. Luisa's walking tour, posted as vlog by Tymek. Paweł praises Karolina's acting ability. Porter Zygmont upgrades Paweł's identity card for staff access. Iwo returns to school. Karol introduces Paweł to fellow staff. Magda maintains illusion of Paris stay. Iwo talks to school psychologist; Iwo claims he had instructions in a dream and travelled to Sejny. Iwo's story becomes increasingly unrealistic and insulting. Paweł asks students to write about their own genius loci. Paweł photographs Tymek's computer screen. Iwo disrupts rehearsal, insults Magda and Slawek. Karol orders Iwo to leave. Paweł reads script Iwo left. During sport Iwo roughs Slawek. Iwo upsets Karolina. Iwo rejects Paweł's attempts to find out about him. Iwo's parents remove him from school. Iwo puts locks on doors; shoots Zygmont dead.
12	2	"Episode 2" (Odcinek 2)	Łukasz Palkowski	Jakub Żulczyk, Monika Powalisz	29 October 2017
Rehearsal starts; Karol's running late. Paweł explains Balladyna's character to Karolina. Iwo locks doors and windows. He restrains Jaga and another student, Tosia. Iwo interrupts rehearsal. Student announces Zygmont's died. Iwo starts firing. Students run except Karolina freezes; shot in gut. Iwo shoots Karol's leg; then leaves. Paweł and Karol sneak students to nearest first aid. Jaga has Tosia remove hairpin, which Jaga uses to break ties. Szymon and Slawek check downstairs but exits locked. Jaga and Tosia paint signs about terrorists. Police phoned. Magda and Karol staunch Karolina's bleeding. Iwo approaches Szymon but lowers gun. Szymon distracts Iwo as Paweł tackles him. Szymon throws Iwo's gun away. Slawek runs past but leaves gun. Iwo collects gun; views CCTV link: police entering. Parents start arriving outside. Police find Zygmont. Paweł gives Karolina drink. Students relocate to staffroom. Iwo shoots police. Jaga and Tosia run past. Tosia finds Slawek's hiding but Slawek shoves Tosia away. Iwo discovers Slawek. Radosław and counter-terrorist unit (SPAP) arrive. Szymon finds opened window, everyone except Paweł and Karolina will leave. Paweł soothes Karolina until she dies. Iwo shoots Karol, who falls out window. Iwo breaks into staffroom; but gun's empty. Iwo approaches SPAP holding gun; Iwo's shot dead.
13	3	"Episode 3" (Odcinek 3)	Łukasz Palkowski	Jakub Żulczyk, Monika Powalisz	5 November 2017
Press films memorial on school steps. Paweł enters hospital; students group hug him. Agata greets Paweł: Karol critically injured. Maria arrives, visits Magda. Radosław's CBŚ search Iwo's home. Internet speculation: Karol fucked Karolina. Magda flirts with Paweł. Radosław requests extra support from Ryszard. Radosław tells Paweł about Iwo's prepper material and badge; will send files. Lucek watches news: victims' funerals. Paweł commiserates with Iwo's parents. Paweł sees Tosia annoyed by Slawek. Maria tells Paweł student enrolment declining; dismisses Internet rumours about Karol. Paweł recommends parents let Magda remain. From Radosław's CCTV files, Paweł sees Iwo and Slawek talking. Students discuss response to Internet criticism. Maria combines classes. Students defend school on vlog. Tymek tells Luisa: "Gudrun" posted first Karol rumours. Students videophone Karol: continuing Balladyna. Slawek informs Paweł: Iwo wanted it continued; shows Iwo's training gym. Gaming shop recognizes badge: Owl Mountains-based preppers. Paweł enters gym; rebuffed by attendees. Rafal and Aneta assault Karol. Magda invites Paweł to dinner but parents are missing. Tymek has Luisa contact "Gudrun", who recognises Luisa. Magda claims briefly stayed in Paris, then hid in Poland. Magda photographs herself with Paweł. "Gudrun" posted Karol's details. Agata takes Karol home. Marta informs Paweł she's pregnant. Lucek collects Magda.
14	4	"Episode 4" (Odcinek 4)	Łukasz Palkowski	Jakub Żulczyk, Monika Powalisz	12 November 2017
Marta lives with Paweł. Karol remembers Iwo disliked script changes. While studying Miłosz, Paweł's class discuss being Ketman (social camouflage). Magda deletes Paweł's photo. Szymon hands Iwo's script to Paweł, which has prepper site drawing. Luiza and Tymek prepare next vlog. Paweł near prepper site, sets off tripwire. Magda and Tymek split. Lucek collects Magda. Paweł finds prepper's locked cache. Marta cooks meal but cannot contact Paweł. Paweł shot by tranquilizer dart; dumped in pit. Marta reports Paweł missing. Tymek interrupts Luiza's date with Patryk. Marta transferred to Radosław. Luiza tells students, she's stopped vlogging. Luiza rejects Magda's friendship. Ryszard tells Radosław to forget Paweł: he's running from Marta. Students tell Karol about Paweł; Szymon helps find Paweł. Karol drops Paweł off. Borys takes him to Radosław. Paweł explains what he found; returns home. Paweł wants to keep Marta safe. CBŚ raids prepper site: it's been cleared. Karol finds Marta a job. Marta stays with Karol's family. CBŚ appoint Orzechowski to supervise Radosław. Paweł refuses to reveal his informer. Radosław threatens Paweł's family. Luiza deduces Patryk posed as "Gudrun"; they break up. Paweł in Dobrowice, seeks Rafał's help. Luiza and Tymek kiss. Tymek threatens to expose Patryk unless he reveals schemes to Karolina's parents.
15	5	"Episode 5" (Odcinek 5)	Łukasz Palkowski	Jakub Żulczyk, Monika Powalisz	19 November 2017
Paweł recruits Ewelina to infiltrate preppers. Karolina's parents throw Patryk out. Patryk begs Tymek: leave him alone. Marta minds Tytus. Ewelina works in school cafe. Karolina's parents apologise to Karol, Maria and Paweł. Patryk expelled. Parents thank Paweł for comforting Karolina; confirm Iwo dumped Karolina.. Students discuss Patryk leaving, Karol returning and Paweł's snooping. Luiza and Tymek have sex. Paweł asks Radosław to ensure Ewelina's safety; provide her money. Tymek researches Paweł's history. Paweł introduces Ewelina to Radosław. Orzechowski asks Radosław for female informant's name. Radosław warns team: Ewelina's underage. Ewelina picks fight with man in bar, gym users help her. Magda flirts with Paweł. Pablo asks Ewelina’s prepper badge. Magda invites Ewelina to school's gym. Magda now has large tattoo. Pablo takes Ewelina to prepper camp; she wears dark goggles. Radosław's alerted to Ewelina's movements. Ewelina meets Tati, who drenches her phone. Pablo tasers Ewelina. Radosław gives Paweł panic button for Ewelina. Ewelina dumped in pit. Tymek blackmails credit card hacker, Jan. Ewelina uncovers manhole, swims to exit. Borys disturbs Marta: Paweł's cheating with schoolgirls. Outside pits, Ewelina stopped by Pablo. Jan hacks Dobrowice's police. At Paweł's flat, Marta leaves upon seeing Ewelina. Tymek learns Paweł works for police.
16	6	"Episode 6" (Odcinek 6)	Maciej Bochniak	Jakub Żulczyk, Monika Powalisz, Bartłomiej Ignaciuk	26 November 2017
Paweł explains to Marta: Ewelina's his informant. Marta asks about photo with Magda. Paweł realizes someone else sent photo. Ewelina moves to hostel. While discussing Camille, Magda exclaims male authors romanticize prostitution. Magda sees Paweł and Ewelina together. Ryszard asks Radosław about female informant, which Orzechowski overheard. Radosław claims they referred to Dorota. Ryszard sends Radosław to Wałbrzych while his team works under Orzechowski. Paweł photographs Ewelina with Radosław. Tymek's abrasive to family during dinner with Luiza. Ewelina stops prepper from overreacting when disciplining their sleepy guard. She's supported by Pablo and Tati. Tati plans citywide blackout. Pablo and Ewelina have sex. Tymek accesses dark web. Pablo invites Ewelina to meet Lucjan. Ewelina presses panic button. Paweł and Marta's weekend together interrupted by Ewelina's alert. "Hallucination" and Ewelina recognize one another. Draco tails Paweł and Marta; Draco threatened with knife by Paweł. Radosław to Paweł: out of town, check Ewelina tomorrow. Magda messages Tymek: Ewelina here. Paweł heads to Ewelina. Tymek rebuffs Luiza; Tymek researches Ewelina, then phones someone. Lucjan sells Tati guns; same as Iwo's. Lucjan questions Ewelina; starts to frisk her. "Hallucination" helps Ewelina escape. Tati and crew leave. Lucjan hunts Ewelina. Paweł finds Ewelina, dead posed as Asia.
17	7	"Episode 7" (Odcinek 7)	Maciej Bochniak	Jakub Żulczyk, Monika Powalisz, Bartłomiej Ignaciuk	3 December 2017
Radosław's CBŚ team attend Ewelina's garotted corpse. Paweł bashes Radosław because Ewelina left unprotected. Radosław tracks preppers. Tymek sees Ewelina's corpse photo. CBŚ raid preppers camp, find guns. Paweł uses Ewelina's descriptions to identify Tati and Pablo. During questioning by Radosław and Dorota, each appeared surprised by Ewelina's strangulation. Pablo names Lucjan and "Halluciantion". Paweł recognizes latter as Magda's alias. Paweł confronts Magda; demands she contact Lucjan. Karol collects Magda for rehearsal. Luiza tells Paweł about Tymek's vlog ads. Rafał confirms police server hacking to Paweł. Magda provides Lucjan's address, which Paweł tells Radosław. Police stop Tymek for ID check; his photos are vandalized. CBŚ raid Lucjan's, they see him fleeing. During shoot-out, Radosław kills Lucjan. Tymek plans revenge for vandalization. While congratulating Radosław for Lucjan, Ryszard deduces Ewelina was his female informant. Radosław ordered: clean any collaboration evidence. Krzysztof tells Radosław: Lucjan was warned. Luiza's vlog hijacked: music ad. Magda invites Luiza for meeting. Marta minds Karol's children. Radosław details prepper plans: power disruption using Iwo's strategy. Paweł blackmails Radosław into determining Ewelina's murderer via vlog ad. Marta informed of Ewelina's murder. Tymek's ads arrange meetings. Luiza searches Magda's home. Radosław arrives at dance club meeting; he's injected, dies.
18	8	"Episode 8" (Odcinek 8)	Maciej Bochniak	Jakub Żulczyk, Monika Powalisz, Bartłomiej Ignaciuk	10 December 2017
Ryszard attends Radosław's corpse. Tymek throws laptop off bridge. Krzysztof: club uses fake cameras. Marta leaves Paweł over Ewelina's death. Paweł to Ryszard: was home, Marta's left him. Dorota asks Paweł: find Tymek. Luiza informs Paweł about Magda's home. Paweł questions Magda: she's an orphan; Lucjan hired actors as "parents". Paweł threatens Magda with police. Pathologist: Radosław murdered by injection. Magda tells Paweł: Iwo wanted her dead, not Karolina. Preppers visit Lucjan; Iwo sees "Hallucination". Paweł updates Marta: Iwo hunted Karol, Magda and Zygmont. Paweł wants to uncover Zygmont. Students perform Balladyna. Maria: Zygmont recommended Karol. Marta sends Paweł photo: Zygmont and Karol related. Luiza finds Tymek. Agata drugs Marta, restrains her. Magda drives Paweł to meet Karol, who garotted Ewelina. Karol: Marta's with Agata. Karol: Paweł in pit for days, so he escapes. Magda asks Karol for Tymek; cannot believe assurances. Paweł pushes Karol into pit. Magda orders Karol to phone Agata; who releases Marta. Magda and Karol reveal spy training. Tymek restrained in computer room. Magda kills Karol so government cannot free him. Paweł admits to killing Karol; Orzechowski frees Paweł as Karol and family left country. Intelligence agents want Paweł working with Magda. Marta rejects Paweł's advances.

=== Season three ===
No. overall	No. in season	Title	Directed by	Written by	Original release date
19	1	"Episode 1" (Odcinek 1)	Łukasz Grzegorzek	Jakub Żulczyk, Monika Powalisz, Kacper Wysocki, Liliana Pomykalska, Przemysław Nowakowski	8 September 2023
Police search ship in harbor. Ewa investigates wave symbol near gangway. Flashback: Bogdan hugs Paweł, drives him home. Ewa collects Ada from bus. Bartek takes marijuana; they kiss. Bogdan invites Paweł for training cruise. Paweł hired by local principal. Paweł introduces himself to Kacper and Ada. Students attend Kacper's party; Ada gives present. Kacper films Waldemar's thugs beating Iwan. Thugs chase Kacper; Waldemar retrieves present. Students aboard ship; Ada plays senet against Kacper. Paweł's literature class discuss "Invictus"; Kacper compares it to Coelho's poetry. Kacper reviews video, exacerbating his discouragement. Paweł asks Bogdan: focus on Kacper. Ada asks Kacper to attend performance of Proserpina (Paweł) and Neptune (Bogdan). Kacper lashes out, hits Bartek, who fights back. Bogdan takes Kacper belowdeck. Kinga believes Kacper's Bogdan's son. Paweł sees Bogdan struggle with Kacper. Paweł lets Kacper out. Kacper apologizes to Paweł; they play senet. Bogdan calls Kacper for duty. Kacper kisses Ada. Kinga and Igor smoke bong. Students cannot find Kacper but gangway gate's open. Students ring alarm. Bogdan alerts coast guard. Paweł photographs symbols behind gate. Another ship finds Kacper's vest. Paweł tries to console students. When lifts his kit he finds Kacper's message. Ewa meets Paweł; Waldemar punches Bogdan. Dead body's washed up.
20	2	"Episode 2" (Odcinek 2)	Łukasz Grzegorzek	Jakub Żulczyk, Monika Powalisz, Kacper Wysocki, Liliana Pomykalska, Przemysław Nowakowski	8 September 2023
Three men transport corpse on small boat. Kinga comforts Ada, who decides against going home. Media speculate that Bogdan's negligent. Ewa questions Bogdan, he did not know Kacper well. Bogdan suggests Ewa ask Ada instead. Ewa notices Ada's gone. Ada and Paweł discuss Kacper. Kacper conflicted with Waldemar, had nervous breakdown: medicated. Ewa inspects corpse, it has wave symbol tattoo. When Bogdan returns he ignores Paweł. Ewa asks Krynickis about Kacper. Waldemar: Kacper's problem child. Basia describes Kacper's scars. Neither recognizes tattoo nor corpse. Car tails Bogdan. Ewa asks Zbyszek whether he recognizes wave symbol. Bogdan phones: delayed by car tailing him. Tomek describes finding vest. Paweł meets Stefan. Ada does not recognize tattoo. Ewa finds Ada's marijuana. Students invite Paweł into derelict tower; they remember Kacper called away from party. Roztocka: corpse beaten up, killed by blow to head – not Kacper. Paweł fixes motorbike; rides to school; introduces himself at assembly. Students recall Kacper's individualism. Kuba delivers improvised poem about Kacper. Paweł recognizes symbol: senet "house of water". Bogdan takes regular swim. Sebastian identifies corpse as Iwan. Waldemar orders Zbyszek: close case. Intruder running wakes Paweł; Bogdan provides improbable story. Kacper's video: he's cowardly, says goodbye to mother.
21	3	"Episode 3" (Odcinek 3)	Łukasz Grzegorzek	Jakub Żulczyk, Monika Powalisz, Kacper Wysocki, Liliana Pomykalska, Przemysław Nowakowski	15 September 2023
As Kacper finishes recording video, Bogdan stands nearby. Bogdan reluctant to report break-in. Zbyszek rails at Ewa: do not try to link two cases. During class, Ada runs out. Mobiles start pinging; Kinga views Kacper's video. Ewa's seen video; asks Paweł where's Bogdan? Paweł tells her about break-in. Ewa questions students, most did not like Kacper. Sebastian stops Ewa questioning Ada. Stefan writes that Bogdan's blameworthy for Kacper's suicide, mentioned video before it was posted. Stopka tells Paweł, Bogdan's swimming. Paweł and Bogdan argue about gun, historical affair with Basia and recent scuffle with Kacper. Paweł accuses Stefan of abusive behavior to students; gut punches Stefan. Sebastian tells Ewa: Jaroslaw admitted to buying stolen goods from Iwan. Zbyszek denies Ewa permission to search warehouse despite Iwan working there. Paweł jailed overnight. Bogdan's brought in for questioning. Bogdan says Kacper's talking about Waldemar. Basia tells Paweł that Bogdan had smuggled amber for Waldemar before they fell out. Bogdan threatens Waldemar with gun. Bogdan realizes Paweł's nomadic; they get drunk. Bartek and Ada have sex. Kacper was Ada's lover. Ewa and Sebastian break into warehouse, surprise two men who run off. Aleksander knocks out Ewa. Paweł finds Bogdan's corpse on beach.
22	4	"Episode 4" (Odcinek 4)	Łukasz Grzegorzek	Jakub Żulczyk, Monika Powalisz, Bartłomiej Ignaciuk, Kacper Wysocki, Liliana Pomykalska, Przemysław Nowakowski	22 September 2023
White-suited man disfigures Iwan. Two thugs carry corpse. Ewa treated by medics. Zbyszek sends Sebastian to Bogdan's corpse overriding Ewa. Sebastian: probable drowning suicide. Ewa comforts Paweł. At home, Ewa observes Ada's feverish. Paweł finds bullet casing. Roztocka to Zbyszek: Bogdan held down, drowned. Zbyszek blackmails Roztocka: declare accidental drowning. Zbyszek updates Waldemar: all covered up; Aleksander's thugs botched Bogdan's search. Waldemar has doubts; Aleksander holds Zbyszek's head under pool water. Bogdan's willed half his house to Milena. Paweł observes Marta and Milena. Igor takes Kinga for thrill ride. Olaf banned Igor driving company cars. Ewa cannot find informer on Bogdan. Igor films sex with Kinga; claims only personal use. Two men interrupt couple, leave Igor; drive Kinga home. Ewa's suspicious of Roztocka's report. Kinga shuns Igor; who overhears Olaf, Robert and Waldemar discussing illegal activities. Paweł gives casing to Ewa. Ada feels guilty over Kacper's death. Paweł scatters Bogdan's ashes aboard Tomek's boat. Ewa scolds Ada and Bartek for marijuana. Igor tells Kinga their fathers ordered Bogdan's death. Kacper's birthdate opens Bogdan's safe; removes documents, mobile phone. Zbyszek tries shelving Iwan's case. Bogdan's funeral held. Paweł hands Bogdan's phone to Ewa. Kacper observes Paweł. Intoxicated Bartek visits Ada.
23	5	"Episode 5" (Odcinek 5)	Łukasz Grzegorzek	Jakub Żulczyk, Monika Powalisz, Kacper Wysocki, Liliana Pomykalska, Przemysław Nowakowski	29 September 2023
Iwan being bashed by Aleksander while Waldemar and confederates watch. Iwan claims he did not steal; Marcin's lying. Waldemar strikes Iwan. Waldemar orders someone to discover Paweł's secrets. Olaf warns Igor: no more chances. Ewa to Sliwinska: Zbyszek's offloading Iwan's case. Paweł discusses Bogdan's death with Leszek. Leszek: Waldemar tipped police about Bogdan's smuggling to stop Basia's affair. Bartek and Ada argue. Igor pretends to delete their video. Paweł shows Marta Bogdan's house; Paweł wants to meet Milena. Zbyszek finally grants permission to visit warehouse. Olaf orders Igor to wash ten cars. Igor has Kinga blackmail Olaf. Paweł considers selling Bogdan's home; he asks Stopka about Kacper's girlfriend. Basia cannot help Paweł; he hands her letters back. Aleksander observes them. Ewa and Sebastian enter warehouse. Worker: Iwan worked for Robert. Sebastian searches cargo container. As Ewa approaches, Marcin runs off, Sebastian catches Marcin. Ada apologises to Paweł for missing funeral; they play senet. Marcin hardly responds to Ewa's questioning. Basia tells Waldemar: she's leaving him. Kinga cries on Robert's shoulder. Zbyszek instructs Marcin. Kinga meets Igor: money drop's ready. Olaf and his men thrash Igor. Police interview men. Marcin confesses to killing Iwan for stealing drugs.
24	6	"Episode 6" (Odcinek 6)	Łukasz Grzegorzek	Jakub Żulczyk, Monika Powalisz, Kacper Wysocki, Liliana Pomykalska, Przemysław Nowakowski	6 October 2023
Kacper recalls Bogdan arranged Tomek to deliver him to Leszek. Kacpe'sr afraid Paweł might get killed. Olaf drives Igor to school; Igor ignores Kinga. Ada hugs Kinga. Paweł has Kuba read "O Captain! My Captain!". No lawyer helps Basia with divorce process. Ewa's suspicious of Marcin; asks Sebastian to delay processing. Kinga apologises to Igor but he films her crying. Car follows Paweł. Olaf bribes Igor with expensive car. Ada searches for Bartek. Paweł tells Ewa that Kacper and Iwan were friends. Ewa dates Zbyszek, hands his keys to Paweł. Paweł investigates Zbyszek's home; photographs documents. Kinga finds Bartek in tower, intoxicated. Bartek starts mumbling. Paweł returns keys before date ends. Paweł found Roztocka's original Bogdan autopsy: he was killed. Igor drives Kinga home; then views their video. Paweł and Ewa follow Zbyszek to his foster mother Stawecka's house. Olaf and Waldemar are already there. Ada and Bartek argue. Stawecka shows Paweł photo of her foster sons. Igor posts revenge porn; Kinga breaks down. Kacper gives phone to Paweł. Marcin admits Zbyszek coerced him into false confession. Marcin: Iwan stole amber from warehouse. Basia to testify against Waldemar. Masked man attacks Paweł. Bartek collects gun from tower.
25	7	"Episode 7" (Odcinek 7)	Łukasz Grzegorzek	Jakub Żulczyk, Monika Powalisz, Kacper Wysocki, Liliana Pomykalska, Przemysław Nowakowski	13 October 2023
Kacper films Iwan's bashing; Waldemar delivers fatal blow. Two thugs chase Kacper. Waldemar finds Iwan's phone: photo of Iwan and Kacper. Aleksander threatens Milena's life; Paweł stabs Aleksander's face. Basia to Ewa: Kacper's DNA matched Waldemar. Zbyszek interrupts, Ewa claims she's updating Basia. Waldemar dismisses Paweł's threats. Aleksander promises girlfriend they will depart soon. Paweł's class compare Crime and Punishment with Macbeth. Bartek leaves when Paweł asks about his injured arm. Ada follows; Bartek pushes her away. Ewa and Sliwinska view Kacper's video of bashing. Aleksander identifiable but not Waldemar. Sliwinska permits Waldemar's arrest. When Ewa arrives; Wademar texts someone. Sebastian tails Aleksander. Robert and Olaf conflict over Kinga and Igor. Waldemar: dismissed Aleksander for smuggling amber. Ewa shows video still. Lawyer: too blurred, could be anyone. Waldemar's released. Paweł takes Basia to Kacper. Olaf asks Waldemar to resolve dire situation. Zbyszek warns Aleksander: Ewa's impending raid. Aleksander flees. Ada treats Bartek's wound. Aleksander avoids meeting Zbyszek. Basia asks Kacper about Iwan. Kacper drives home; berates Waldemar for being ashamed of him. Zbyszek learns Aleksander's location. Paweł drives to Waldemar's. Igor sees Aleksander arrive at Podolex but Igor's shot. Ewa calls for backup. Paweł sees Waldemar's corpse in pool.
26	8	"Episode 8" (Odcinek 8)	Łukasz Grzegorzek	Jakub Żulczyk, Monika Powalisz, Kacper Wysocki, Liliana Pomykalska, Przemysław Nowakowski	20 October 2023
Waldemar has cut his own wrists. Kacper runs away. Ewa patrols Podolex yard; Aleksander knocks her out, takes her hostage. Basia phones Ada, implies Kacper's alive. Aleksander attempts driving out but police back up arrives. Aleksander threatens to kill hostages. Aleksander orders Zbyszek: save him or he will talk. Paweł enters yard, approaches Aleksander. Paweł volunteers to swap with injured Igor. Igor allowed out. Paweł and Ewa convince Aleksander to surrender. Aleksander walks out with hands raised; Zbyszek kills him. Ada hugs Kacper at Bogdan's. Zbyszek claims he was protecting Ewa. Paweł uses Aleksander's phone to call Zbyszek. Zbyszek brandishes another officer's gun, but surrenders. Kacper explains situation to Ada. Ewa attends Waldemar's corpse. Ada tells Paweł that Bartek does drugs, injures himself. Zbyszek does not know who killed Bogdan. Bartek, at police station, wants to see Ewa or Paweł but they are busy. Paweł drives Kacper and Ada to Bogdan's ship; Bartek cycles after them. Bartek threatens Ada with Bogdan's gun. Ada and Bartek stole Bogdan's gun, wanted to learn about Kacper. Bartek accidentally killed Bogdan. Kacper cuddles Bartek. Police arrest Bartek and Ada; Ewa cries. One Year Later: Paweł and Kacper ride motorcycle. Ada's out; Paweł's forgiven her.
