= Polish Academy Award for Best TV Series =

Annual Polish television award

The Polish Academy Award for Best TV Series has been awarded annually since 2015 by the Polish Film Academy. Award is given to the director, main producer and original broadcaster of the series.

== Winner and nominees ==
Year	TV Series title	Director(s)	Producer(s)	Broadcaster
2015	Czas Honoru-Powstanie	Jan Hryniak	Michał Kwieciński	TVP2
2015	Wataha	Michał Gazda, Katarzyna Adamik	Izabela Łopuch	HBO
2015	Ranczo (season 8)	Wojciech Adamczyk	Dorota Hawliczek, Paweł Mantorski	TVP1
2016	Prokurator	Jacek Filipiak, Maciej Pieprzyca	Magdalena Zielska	TVP2
2016	Dziewczyny ze Lwowa	Wojciech Adamczyk	Maciej Strzembosz, Dorota Hawliczek	TVP1
2016	Służby specjalne	Patryk Vega	Patryk Vega, Emil Stępień	TVP2
2017	Belfer	Łukasz Palkowski	Wojciech Bockenheim and Krzysztof Lojan	Canal+
2017	Artysci	Monika Strzępka		TVP2
2017	Ranczo	Wojciech Adamczyk		TVP1
