= Malwina Buss =

Polish actress (born 1991)

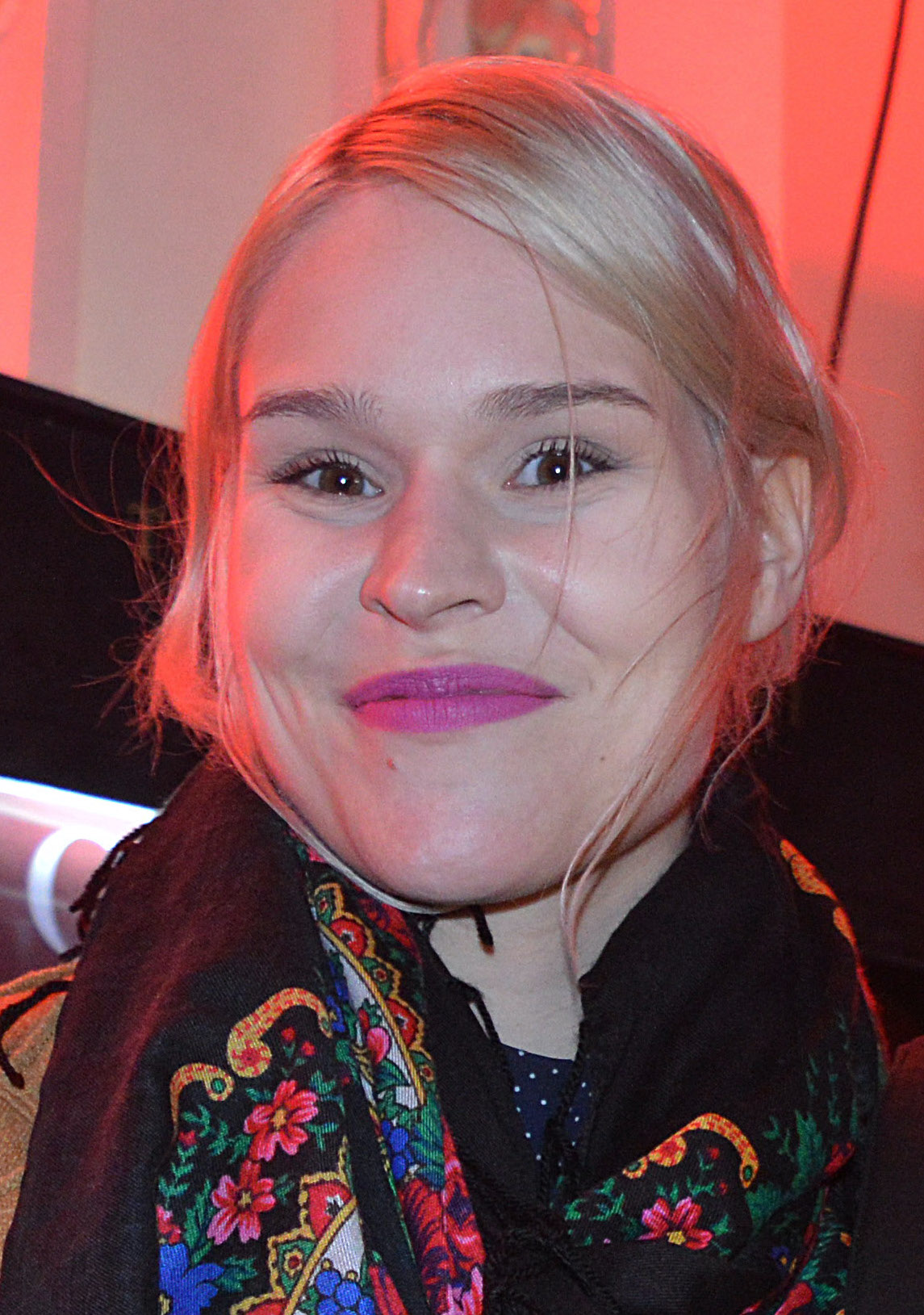
- Born: Buss in 2017. 16 November 1991 (age 34); Warsaw, Poland
- Occupation: Actress
- Years active: 2007–present
- Spouse: Tomasz Włosok (m. 2019)
- Children: 1

Malwina Buss (Polish: [malˈvi.na ˈbus]; born 16 November 1991) is a Polish film and television actress. From 2007 to 2011, she portrayed Natalia Zwoleńska, one of the main characters in the TVP2 drama series Barwy szczęścia, and Wioletta, a recurring character in the TVN drama series Na Wspólnej. Buss also portrayed main characters of Agnieszka Winkler in the 2010 Monolith Films thriller drama film Seven Minutes, and Jadwiga Kwiatkowska in the Monolith Films war drama film Rose. From 2016 to 2017, she portrayed recurring characters in the television series, including the Sony Pictures Television crime thriller series Rysa (2020), Szczur in the Polsat crime series Cień (2021), Anka in the TVP1 crime series Crusade (2021), Elwira Hulak in the Polsat comedy drama series Rafi (2023), and Ela in the Polsat psychological thriller series Zakładnicy (2024). Buss also portrayed secondary characters of Maria Anton in the 2017 Kino Świat drama film Chain Reaction, and Dominika in the 2020 Next Film drama film Overclockers.

== Biography ==
Malwina Buss was born on 16 November 1991 in Warsaw, Poland. She graduated from the Jean Monnet Private General Education Highschool no. 32 in Warsaw.

Buss debuted in 2007, with episodic roles in television series I'll Show You!, and Two Sides of the Coin. From 2007 to 2011, she portrayed Natalia Zwoleńska, one of the main characters in the TVP2 drama series Barwy szczęścia, and Wioletta, a recurring character in the TVN drama series Na Wspólnej. Buss appeared in the 2009 Monolith Films comedy film Zmianna, and the 2010 Canal+ comedy drama film Father, Son and Holy Cow. She also portrayed main characters of Agnieszka Winkler in the 2010 Monolith Films thriller drama film Seven Minutes, and Jadwiga Kwiatkowska in the Monolith Films war drama film Rose. She also appeared in the television series Siła wyższa (2011), Komisarz Alex (2012), and True Law (2012). From 2016 to 2017, she portrayed Jowita Wójcik, a recurring character in the Canal+ crime drama series The Teacher. She also appeared in the television series I'll Be Fine (2017), Na dobre i na złe (2017–2018), Chyłka. Zaginięcie (2018), and Ślad (2018). She later also portrayed recurring characters, in television series, including Ola in the webseries Lockdown Stories (2020), Jola in the Sony Pictures Television crime thriller series Rysa (2020), Szczur in the Polsat crime series Cień (2021), Anka in the TVP1 crime series Crusade (2021), Elwira Hulak in the Polsat comedy drama series Rafi (2023), and Ela in the Polsat psychological thriller series Zakładnicy (2024). Buss also portrayed secondary characters of Maria Anton in the 2017 Kino Świat drama film Chain Reaction, and Dominika in the 2020 Next Film drama film Overclockers. She also has minor roles in the feature films Breaking the Limits (2017), Green Border (2020), Brother (2025).

== Personal life ==
In 2019, she married actor Tomasz Włosok, with whom she has a daughter born in the same year.

== Filmography ==
=== Films ===
Year	Title	Role	Notes
2009	Zamiana	Agata Więcek	Feature film
2010	Father, Son and Holy Cow	Ola	Feature film
2010	Seven Minutes	Agnieszka Winkler	Feature film
2011	Rose	Jadwiga Kwiatkowska	Feature film
2013	Tak bardzo cię kocham	Student	Short film
2013	Zasady gry	Girl in a tram	Short film
2015	Brilliance	Marlene	Short film
2017	Breaking the Limits	Rehab patient	Feature film
2017	Chain Reaction	Maria Anton	Feature film
2017	The Best Fireworks Ever	Anna	Short film
2020	Overclockers	Dominika	Feature film
2023	Green Border	Kasia	Feature film
2025	Brother	Nurse	Feature film

=== Television series ===
Year	Title	Role	Notes
2007	I'll Show You!	Tośka's friend	2 episodes
2007	Two Sides of the Coin	Student with marijuana	Episode no. 53
2007–2011	Barwy szczęścia	Natalia Zwoleńska	Main role; 681 episodes
2007–2011	Na Wspólnej	Wioletta	Recurring role; 13 episodes
2011	Siła wyższa	Milena	Episodes: "Porwanie"
2012	Komisarz Alex	Muka dealer	Episode: "Feralne zdjęcie"
2012	True Law	Justyna Cisowska	2 episodes
2016–2017	The Teacher	Jowita Wójcik	Recurring role; 13 episodes
2017	I'll Be Fine	Dorota	Episode no. 80
2017–2018	Na dobre i na złe	Paulina Janus	3 episodes
2018	Chyłka. Zaginięcie	Girl	Episode no. 1
2018	Ślad	Irena Kruczek	Episode no. 19
2020	Lockdown Stories	Ola	Webseries; 4 episodes
2020	Rysa	Jola	Recurring role
2021	Cień	Szczur	Main roles; 13 episodes
2021	Crusade	Anka	5 episodes
2021	Tajemnica zawodowa	Iza Kujawa	Episode no. 9
2023	Rafi	Elwira Hulak	Recurring role; 6 episodes
2024	Go Ahead, Brother	Iwona Sokołowska	Episode no. 3
2024	Zakładnicy	Ela	Recurring role; 7 episodes

=== Polish-language dubbing ===
Year	Title	Role	Notes
2012–2013	Bucket & Skinner's Epic Adventures	Nicole	Originally aired between 2011 and 2013
2022	Just Like Me!	Client #2	Episode: "Haters"; originally aired in 2016
2022	Just Like Me!	Client #3	Episode: "Haters"; originally aired in 2016
2022	Just Like Me!	Woman in the audience	Episode: "De Shake (deel 2)"; originally aired in 2017
2022	Just Like Me!	Lady	Episode: "Hartstikke nep"; originally aired in 2017
