= My Wonderful Life (film) =

Comedy drama film directed by Lukasz Grzegorzek

- Directed by: Łukasz Grzegorzek
- Written by: Łukasz Grzegorzek
- Produced by: Natalia Grzegorzek
- Starring: Agata Buzek; Jacek Braciak; Adam Woronowicz
- Edited by: Lukasz Grzegorzek
- Production companies: Koskino Natalia Grzegorzek; Dolnoslaskie Centrum Filmowe; Polish Film Institute
- Distributed by: Gutek Film (Poland); Netflix (internationally)
- Release date: October 29, 2021
- Running time: 99 minutes
- Country: Poland
- Language: Polish
- Budget: €1 million

My Wonderful Life (Polish: Moje wspaniale zycie) is a 2021 Polish romantic comedy drama film written and directed by Łukasz Grzegorzek. The film stars Agata Buzek, Jacek Braciak and Adam Woronowicz. The film premiered at the 2021 New Horizons Film Festival and later on Polish Film Festival winning Best Director Award. My Wonderful Life was released in selected theatres on October 29, 2021, in Poland. It premiered internationally on Netflix on February 28, 2022.

At the 24th Polish Film Awards, My Wonderful Life received five nominations: for Best Film, Best Screenplay, Best Actress (Buzek), Best Actor (Braciak), and Best Supporting Actor (Woronowicz), with Buzek winning award for Best Actress.

The film was recorded in Nysa, Oleśnica and Prudnik.

== Plot ==
The film follows unhappily married woman Joanna 'Jo' Lisiecka who lives with her husband, sons, grandchild and mother with Alzheimer. She teaches English in a small-town secondary school and is having a secret love affair with the father of one of her students.

== Cast ==
- Agata Buzek as Joanna 'Jo' Lisiecka
- Jacek Braciak as Witek Lisiecki
- Adam Woronowicz as Maciek
- Małgorzata Zajączkowska as Grandma
- Jakub Zajac as Adam
- Wiktoria Wolanska as Karina
- Leon Grzegorzek as Leos

== Reception ==
My Wonderful Life received mixed-to-positive reviews from critics. Film critic Ola Salwa of Cineuropa gave it a positive review praised Łukasz Grzegorzek's directing and Agata Buzek' performance writing: "Grzegorzek wrote his script with Agata Buzek in mind, and her performance is just brilliant. She makes her character warm, funny, mysterious and, at the same time, very down to earth." Devika Girish of The New York Times also gave it a positive review writing: "Swirling around Buzek’s delicate, restrained performance, “My Wonderful Life” has a surprisingly breezy texture to it. Shot with a hand-held camera in airy, diaphanous light, the film dwells as much in Jo and her family's everyday moments together as it probes the suspense and sorrows of her predicament. "
