= The Balcony Movie =

Film balkonowy
- Theatrical release poster
- Directed by: Paweł Łoziński
- Written by: Paweł Łoziński
- Produced by: Paweł Łoziński; Agnieszka Mankiewicz
- Narrated by: Paweł Łoziński
- Cinematography: Paweł Łoziński
- Edited by: Paweł Łoziński; Bartlomiej Piasek; Piotr Wójcik
- Music by: Jan Duszynski
- Production companies: City of Warsaw; HBO Europe; Kreatywna Europa; Lozinski Production; Mazovia Region; Mazowiecki Instytut Kultury; PISF
- Release dates: 7 August 2021 (Locarno); 8 April 2022 (Poland)
- Running time: 100 minutes
- Country: Poland
- Languages: Polish; English; Russian

The Balcony Movie (Polish: Film balkonowy) is a 2021 Polish documentary by Paweł Łoziński, who wrote, directed, and filmed it. The film captures Łoziński's conversations with people passing below his Warsaw apartment, each sharing their unique life experiences.

== Production ==
Filming spanned over two years starting in 2018, with nearly 2,000 individuals passing under the balcony during the 165-day shoot.

== Release ==
Premiering on 7 August 2021, at the Semaine de la critique during the Locarno Film Festival, it later released in Polish theaters on 8 April 2022, followed by an HBO Max release on 17 April 2022.

== Awards ==
The film was shortlisted by Poland's Polski Instytut Sztuki Filmowej to represent Poland in the Best International Feature Film category at the 95th Academy Awards, but the film was not selected.

Award / Festival	Category	Recipient(s)	Result	Ref(s)
Cinema Eye Honors Awards	Cinema Eye Audience Choice Prize	The Balcony Movie	Nominated	
The DokuBaku International Documentary Film Festival	iCyborg Award	The Balcony Movie	Won	
The DokuBaku International Documentary Film Festival	Human Award for the best feature documentary film	The Balcony Movie	Won	
European Film Awards	European Documentary	The Balcony Movie	Nominated	
Leipzig DOK Festival	MDR Film Prize - Outstanding Eastern European Film	The Balcony Movie	Won	
Leipzig DOK Festival	Audience Award - Best Documentary	The Balcony Movie	Nominated	
Locarno International Film Festival	Critics Week Award	The Balcony Movie	Won	
Millennium Docs Against Gravity	Grand Prix Bank Millenium Award - Special Mention	The Balcony Movie	Won	
Millennium Docs Against Gravity	Studio Cinemas Association Award - Special Mention	The Balcony Movie	Won	
Millennium Docs Against Gravity	Best Polish Film Award	The Balcony Movie	Nominated	
Millennium Docs Against Gravity	Grand Prix Bank Millenium Award	The Balcony Movie	Nominated	
2022 Polish Film Awards	Best Documentary	The Balcony Movie	Won	
2022 Polish Film Awards	Best Director	Paweł Łoziński	Nominated	
2022 Polish Film Awards	Best Editing	Piotr Wójcik, Bartlomiej Piasek, Paweł Łoziński	Nominated	
