= Hanna Samson =

Polish writer, psychologist and feminist

Hanna Samson is a Polish psychologist, journalist, feminist and writer. She works as a hotline worker in the Feminoteka Foundation where she provides psychological advice and support to women who suffer violence. Hanna Samson conducts group therapy in the Center of Leadership Education Foundation.

She used to be a writer in Polish magazines for women Twój Styl. Samson works in magazines "Sens" and "Business Class" and publishes in a monthly women magazine "Zwierciadło" and a weekly women magazine "Wysokie Obcasy".

== Books ==
- 1996: Zimno mi, mamo
- 2000: Pułapka na motyla
- 2001: 7 opowiadań o miłości i jedno inne
- 2004: Miłość. Reaktywacja
- 2005: Wojna żeńsko-męska i przeciwko światu. Wyd. II. Warszawa: Wydawnictwo Czarna Owca, 2011. ISBN 978-83-7554-367-4. (pol.)
- 2006: Pokój żeńsko-męski na chwałę patriarchatu
- 2007: 7 grzechów przeciwko miłości
- 2009: Flesz. Zbiorowy akt popświadomości
- 2010: Ja, prezydenta i inne głosy
- 2012: Życie po mężczyźnie
