= The Here After =

- Film poster
- Directed by: Magnus von Horn
- Written by: Magnus Von Horn
- Produced by: Madeleine Ekman; Mariusz Wlodarski
- Starring: Ulrik Munther
- Cinematography: Łukasz Żal
- Edited by: Agnieszka Glińska
- Production company: Zentropa International Sweden
- Release dates: 21 May 2015 (Cannes); 11 September 2015 (TIFF); 9 October 2015 (Poland); 20 November 2015 (Sweden)
- Running time: 102 minutes
- Countries: Sweden; France; Poland
- Language: Swedish

The Here After (Swedish: Efterskalv) is a 2015 Swedish drama film written and directed by Magnus von Horn, about a boy returning home after serving time in prison, only to find that the local community has not forgotten or forgiven his crime. The film is a co-production between Sweden, Poland and France. It was screened in the Directors' Fortnight section at the 2015 Cannes Film Festival. The film won the Guldbagge Award for Best Film, Best Director for Magnus von Horn and Best Supporting Actor for Mats Blomgren at the 51st Guldbagge Awards.

== Cast ==
- Ulrik Munther as John
- Mats Blomgren as Martin
- Wiesław Komasa as Grandfather
- Alexander Nordgren as Filip
- Loa Ek as Malin
- Ellen Jelinek as Bea
- Feliv Göransson as Korv-Hampus

== Reception ==
The Here After received positive reviews from critics. On Rotten Tomatoes, the film has an 88% score based on 16 reviews, with an average rating of 6.4/10.
