= Łukasz Grzegorzek =

Polish film director and screenwriter (born 1980)

- Born: 1980 (age 45–46); Nysa
- Citizenship: Polish
- Education: University of Warsaw
- Occupations: Film director, screenwriter

Łukasz Grzegorzek (born 1980) is a film director and screenwriter.

== Biography ==
He graduated in law from the University of Warsaw.

== Filmography ==
- Kamper (2016)
- Córka trenera (2018)
- My Wonderful Life (2021)
- The Teacher (TV series, season three, 2023)
- Trzy miłości (2025)

== Awards ==
For My Wonderful Life he earned best director award at the Polish Film Festival in Gdynia in 2021.
