= Raven (Polish TV series) =

Polish crime drama television series

- Polish poster
- Polish: Kruk
- Genre: Crime drama
- Created by: Jakub Korolczuk
- Written by: Jakub Korolczuk
- Directed by: Maciej Pieprzyca
- Starring: Michał Żurawski; Tomasz Włosok; Katarzyna Wajda; Danuta Kierklo; Magdalena Koleśnik; Zbigniew Stryj; Sebastian Cybulski
- Composer: Bartosz Chajdecki
- Country of origin: Poland
- Original language: Polish
- No. of seasons: 3
- No. of episodes: 18

Production
- Producers: Łukasz Dzięcioł; Piotr Dzięcioł
- Cinematography: Jan Holoubek; Witold Płóciennik
- Editors: Piotr Kmiecik; Wojciech Mrówczynski
- Running time: 40–63 minutes
- Production companies: ITI Neovision; Opus TV

Original release
- Network: Canal+ Premium
- Release: 18 March 2018 – 23 December 2022

Raven (Polish: Kruk) is a Polish crime drama television series created by Jakub Korolczuk. It aired on Canal+ Premium from 18 March 2018 to 23 December 2022.

== Premise ==
After several years of working in Łódź, Commissioner Adam Kruk returns to his hometown of Białystok to investigate the kidnapping of an 11-year-old boy.

== Cast ==
- Michał Żurawski as Commissioner Adam Kruk
  - Nicolas Przygoda as young Adam
- Tomasz Włosok as Tomek "Rudy" Wójcik
- Katarzyna Wajda as Anka Kruk, Adam's wife
- Danuta Kierklo as "Szeptucha"
- Magdalena Koleśnik Justyna Ataman
- Zbigniew Stryj as Commander Bogdanowicz
- Sebastian Cybulski as Stanisław Morawski
- Adam Cywka as Marek Ataman, Justyna's father
- Igor Kujawski as Igor Dunaj
- Szymon Majchrzak as "Grek"
- Cezary Łukaszewicz as Sławek
  - Hubert Wiatrowski as young Sławek
- Barbara Kurzaj as Marzena Wasilewska
- Mariusz Jakus as Officer Marek Kaponow
- Andrzej Zaborski as Commander Stanisław Tylenda
- Jan Szydłowski as Rafałek Morawski
- Michał Filipiak as Officer Borowiecki
- Jerzy Schejbal as Zygmunt Morawski
- Grzegorz Prasalski as Czarny
- Barbara Wypych as Officer Kasia Wójcik
- Anna Nehrebecka as Anna Morawska
- Piotr Dąbrowski as Bogdan Wasiluk
- Marcin Bosak as Szymon Wasiluk

== Episodes ==
=== Series overview ===
Series	Episodes	Originally released		
Series	Episodes	First released	Last released	Network
1	6	18 March 2018	22 April 2018	Canal+
2	6	9 July 2021	13 August 2021	Canal+
3	6	9 December 2022	23 December 2022	Canal+

=== Season 1 ===
No. overall	No. in season	Title	Duration	Original release date
1	1	"Episode 1.1"	52 min	18 March 2018
2	2	"Episode 1.2"	50 min	25 March 2018
3	3	"Episode 1.3"	51 min	1 April 2018
4	4	"Episode 1.4"	52 min	8 April 2018
5	5	"Episode 1.5"	50 min	15 April 2018
6	6	"Episode 1.6"	63 min	22 April 2018

=== Season 2 ===
No. overall	No. in season	Title	Duration	Original release date
7	1	"Episode 2.1"	52 min	9 July 2021
8	2	"Episode 2.2"	51 min	16 July 2021
9	3	"Episode 2.3"	55 min	23 July 2021
10	4	"Episode 2.4"	53 min	30 July 2021
11	5	"Episode 2.5"	51 min	6 August 2021
12	6	"Episode 2.6"	55 min	13 August 2021

=== Season 3 ===
No. overall	No. in season	Title	Duration	Original release date
13	1	"Episode 3.1"	50 min	9 December 2022
14	2	"Episode 3.2"	47 min	9 December 2022
15	3	"Episode 3.3"	48 min	16 December 2022
16	4	"Episode 3.4"	42 min	16 December 2022
17	5	"Episode 3.5"	42 min	16 December 2022
18	6	"Episode 3.6"	40 min	23 December 2022

== Production ==
Filming for the first season of the series began in October 2017. Filming locations in the Podlaskie Voivodeship included Białystok, Czarna Białostocka, Kruszyniany, and Podbiele.
