= Łukasz Palkowski =

Polish film director and screenwriter (born 1976)

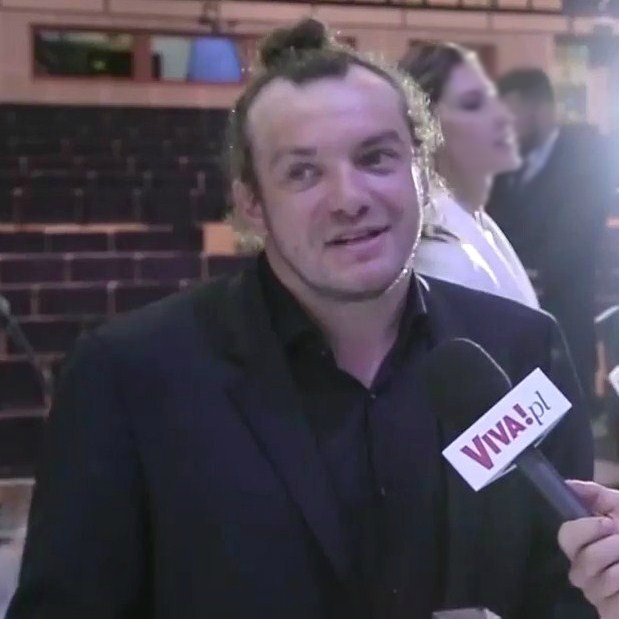
- Łukasz Palkowski, 2017
- Born: 2 March 1976 (age 50); Warsaw, Poland
- Occupations: Film director, screenwriter

Łukasz Palkowski (born 2 March 1976, Warsaw) is a Polish film director and screenwriter.

== Life and career ==
He initially studied at the National Film School in Łódź but dropped out. In 2007, he made his first full-length feature film entitled Rezerwat. The film tells the story of a photographer living in the Praga District of Warsaw who becomes infatuated with a local hairdresser and as a result comes into conflict with a criminal who shares a flat with her. He received an award for best debut at the 32nd Gdynia Film Festival and Paszport Polityki. In 2011, he directed Wojna żeńsko-męska based on a novel by Hanna Samson, which received much less favourable reviews from critics.

In 2014, Palkowski directed film Gods starring Tomasz Kot and based on the life of Zbigniew Religa, a surgeon who carried out the first heart transplant in Poland. The film gained critically acclaim and won the Grand Prix at the 39th Gdynia Film Festival as well as the Polish Film Award for Best Film. In 2017, he directed a biopic Breaking the Limits inspired by the life of triathlete Jerzy Górski. The film received the Audience Award at the Gdynia Film Festival.

He also directed a number of television series including an award-winning crime drama Belfer in 2016. He also directed the first six episodes of Pułapka ("The Trap") TV series in 2018 while in 2019 he directed Żmijowisko based on Wojciech Chmielarz's crime novel.

== Filmography ==
- Rezerwat, 2007
- 39 i pół, TV series, episodes 6-13, 2008
- Wojna żeńsko-męska, 2011
- Bogowie, 2014
- Belfer, TV series 2016
- Diagnoza, TV series, 2017
- Breaking the Limits, 2017
- Pułapka, TV series, 2017
- Chyłka. Kasacja, TV series, 2018-2019
- Behawiorysta, TV series, 2022

== Screenplay ==
- Nasza ulica, 2004
- Rezerwat, 2007

== See also ==
- Polish cinema
