= Magnus von Horn =

Swedish film director and screenwriter

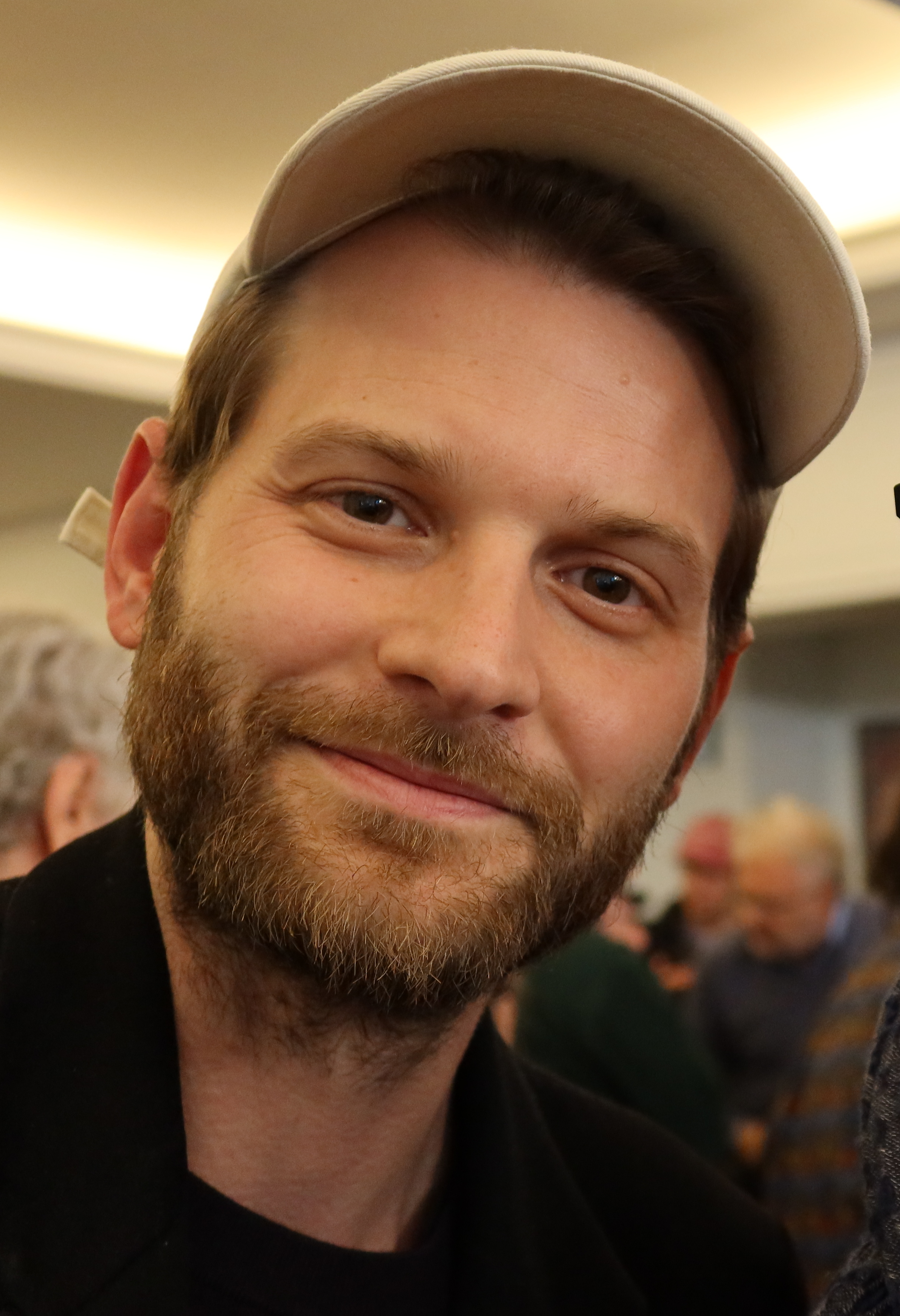
- Horn in 2025
- Born: 21 December 1983 (age 42); Gothenburg, Sweden
- Education: Łódź Film School
- Occupations: Film director; screenwriter

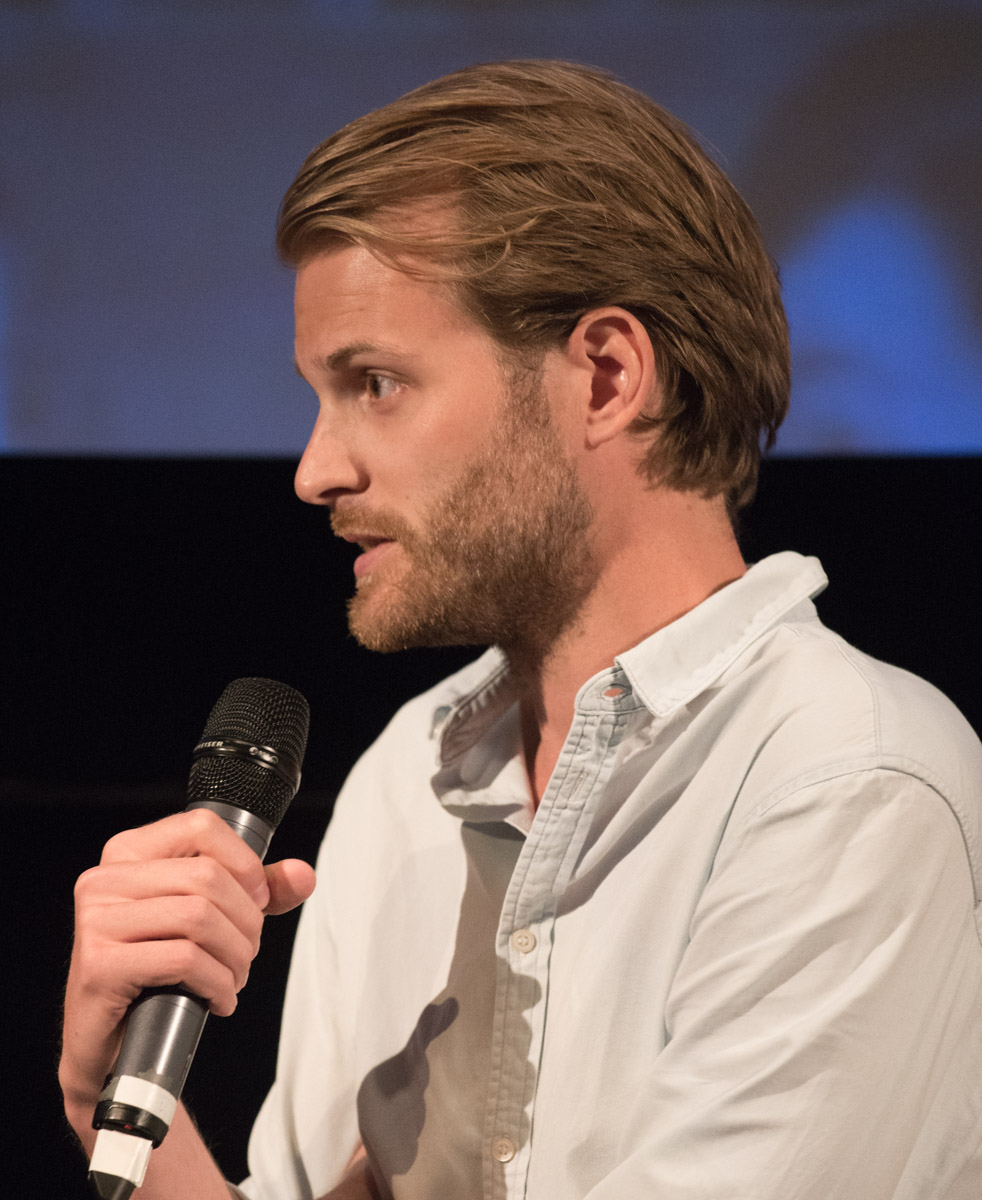
von Horn in 2015

Magnus von Horn (born 21 December 1983) is a Swedish-Polish film director and screenwriter.

== Career ==
Horn graduated from the Łódź Film School in 2013. A few months after he arrived in Poland, he was brutally robbed, an experience that sparked his interest in exploring violent people through film. His first film was a short documentary about a young Polish criminal. His 2011 short, Without Snow, was nominated for the Guldbagge Award for Best Short Film. His debut feature, The Here After, premiered in the Directors' Fortnight of the 2015 Cannes Film Festival.

His sophomore film, Sweat, was selected for the 2020 Cannes Film Festival. His third feature, The Girl with the Needle, premiered in Competition at the 2024 Cannes Film Festival, and was named one of the year's Top Five International Films by the National Board of Review. It received a nomination for Best International Feature Film at the 97th Academy Awards.

In June 2025, Horn was invited to join the Academy of Motion Picture Arts and Sciences.

== Filmography ==
=== Feature films ===
Year	English title	Original title
2015	The Here After	Efterskalv
2020	Sweat	
2024	The Girl with the Needle	Pigen med nålen

=== Short films ===
- Radek (2006)
- Mleczaki (2007)
- Echo (2008)
- Without Snow (Utan snö) (2011)

== Awards and nominations ==
Award	Year	Category	Work	Result	Ref.
Camerimage	2024	Special Mention	The Girl with the Needle	Won	
Cannes Film Festival	2015	Caméra d'Or	The Here After	Nominated	
Cannes Film Festival	2024	Palme d'Or	The Girl with the Needle	Nominated	
Chicago International Film Festival	2020	Gold Hugo	Sweat	Won	
European Film Awards	2024	European Screenwriter	The Girl with the Needle	Nominated	
Göteborg Film Festival	2025	FIPRESCI Award	The Girl with the Needle	Won	
Guldbagge Awards	2012	Best Short Film	Without Snow	Nominated	
Guldbagge Awards	2016	Best Director	The Here After	Won	
Palm Springs International Film Festival	2025	Variety’s Directors to Watch	The Girl with the Needle	Won	
Polish Film Awards	2016	Best Director	The Here After	Nominated	
Polish Film Awards	2016	Discovery of the Year	The Here After	Nominated	
Polish Film Awards	2022	Best Director	Sweat	Nominated	
Polish Film Awards	2025	Best Film	The Girl with the Needle	Won	
Polish Film Awards	2025	Best Director	The Girl with the Needle	Won	
Polish Film Awards	2025	Best Screenplay	The Girl with the Needle	Won	
Seville European Film Festival	2024	Best Director	The Girl with the Needle	Won	
