= Sweat (2020 film) =

2020 film by Magnus von Horn

- Theatrical release poster
- Directed by: Magnus von Horn
- Written by: Magnus von Horn
- Produced by: Mariusz Włodarski
- Starring: Magdalena Kolesnik; Julian Świeżewski; Aleksandra Konieczna; Zbigniew Zamachowski
- Cinematography: Michał Dymek
- Edited by: Agnieszka Glińska
- Music by: Piotr Kurek
- Production companies: Lava Films; Zentropa Sweden; Film i Väst; Canal+ Poland; EC1 Łódź – The City of Culture; Opus Film; DI Factory
- Distributed by: Gutek Film (Poland); TriArt (Sweden)
- Release dates: 14 September 2020 (TIFF); 12 March 2021 (Sweden); 18 June 2021 (Poland)
- Running time: 105 minutes
- Countries: Poland; Sweden
- Language: Polish
- Box office: $11,546

Sweat is a 2020 drama film written and directed by Magnus von Horn. It stars Magdalena Kolesnik, Julian Swiezewski, Aleksandra Konieczna and Zbigniew Zamachowski.

== Synopsis ==
Sylwia Zając, a fitness motivator influencer surrounded by admirers and loyal employees, searches for true intimacy.

== Cast ==
- Magdalena Koleśnik as Sylwia Zając
- Julian Świeżewski as Klaudiusz
- Aleksandra Konieczna as Basia
- Zbigniew Zamachowski as Fryderyk
- Tomasz Orpiński as Rysiek
- Lech Łotocki as Andrzej
- Magdalena Kuta as Danuta
- Dominika Biernat as Wiktoria
- Katarzyna Dziurska as Kasia
- Wiktoria Filus as Zosia
- Bartosz Sak as Kacper
- Edgar Griszczuk as Eryk
- Dorota Zięciowska as Italo disco star
- Katarzyna Cynke as Marieta
- Bogna Defecińska as Ania

== Release ==
The film was set to have its world premiere at the Cannes Film Festival in May 2020, but the festival was cancelled due to the COVID-19 pandemic. In July 2020, it was announced Gutek Film, TriArt and Mubi had acquired distribution rights to the film in Poland, Sweden and the United States, respectively. Sweat was released in Sweden on 12 March 2021 and in Poland on 18 June 2021.

== Reception ==
Sweat holds a 98% approval rating on review aggregator website Rotten Tomatoes, based on 51 reviews, with an average rating of 7.4/10. The site's critical consensus reads, "Well-acted and appropriately beautiful, Sweat takes a thoughtful, empathetic look at social media fame." The film won the Gold Hugo at the Chicago International Film Festival.

In a review of the film, Giuseppe Sedia wrote for Kino Mania: "While there is no ground to label Sweat as a sophomore slump, von Horn could have gone over the argument that social influencers can have a very complex inner life just like anybody else". He also praised the performance of Zbigniew Zamachowski "who seems to come out straight from an episode of Kieślowski's Dekalog".
