= The Dog Who Travelled by Train 2 =

2025 film adventure children's film

- Poster
- Directed by: Magdalena Nieć
- Written by: Katarzyna Gacek; Magdalena Nieć; Mojca Tirš
- Produced by: Filip Bałdyga; Agnieszka Nejman; Beata Ryczkowska; Małgorzata Seck
- Starring: Liliana Zajbert; Maksymilian Zieliński; Mateusz Damięcki; Monika Pikuła; Adam Woronowicz
- Edited by: Tomasz Kolak
- Music by: Maciej Zieliński
- Production companies: Canal+ Polska; K&K Selekt Film
- Distributed by: Kino Świat
- Release date: 6 August 2025
- Running time: 89 minutes
- Country: Poland
- Language: Polish

The Dog Who Travelled by Train 2 (Polish: O psie, który jeździł koleją 2), also known as Lampo, the Travelling Dog 2, and The Travelling Dog 2, is a 2025 Polish-language adventure children's film directed by Magdalena Nieć and written by her together with Katarzyna Gacek and Mojca Tirš. Produced by Canal+ Polska and K&K Selekt Film in Poland, it starred Liliana Zajbert, Mateusz Damięcki, Monika Pikuła, Maksymilian Zielinski, and Adam Woronowicz. The film premiered on 6 August 2025. It is a continuation of the 2023 film The Dog Who Travelled by Train, which was loosely based on 1967 children's book O psie, który jeździł koleją by Roman Pisarski, which in turn was inspired by the life of dog Lampo in the 1950s Italy. The story revolves around Zuzia, who embarks on an adventure together with her friend Antek, to find her missing dog Lampo.

== Plot ==
After undergoing a successful surgery in the United States, Zuzia (Liliana Zajbert) returns to her hometown in Poland with her parents. During their absence, their dog Lampo, who is nationwide internet sensation, thanks to its solo travels by train, is placed in the care of the station manager Adam Poprawny (Adam Woronowicz). The dog continues his habit of traveling solo by train. While, previously, he always returned to the same railway station, one day he disappears, with a signal from a GPS tracker in his collar vanishing. Panicked station manager Poprawny adopts a similar-looking dog from an animal shelter. However, after returning home Zuzia realizes that the animal in her house is not her pet, but rather a female dog named Luna. Together with her friend Antek (Maksymilian Zieliński) and dog Luna, she embarks on an adventure to find her missing pet. The panicked station manager Poprawny goes after them to ensure their safety.

== Cast ==
- Liliana Zajbert as Zuzia
- Adam Woronowicz as Adam Poprawny, the regional station manager
- Maksymilian Zieliński as Antek, Zuzia's friend and Adam Poprawny's son
- Monika Pikuła as Małgorzata, Zuzia's mother
- Mateusz Damięcki as Piotr, Zuzia's father
- Krzysztof Dracz as Ciemny
- Karol Osentowski as Tadek, Ciemny's nephew
- Milena Lisiecka as Michalina
- Michalina Łabacz as Kinga
- Amelia Wittkowicz as Amelia' Kinga's daughter
- Elżbieta Jarosik as Natalia, Amelia's babysitter
- Karol Jankiewicz as Kinga's assistant
- Barbara Jonak as an animal shelter director
- Henryk Niebudek as Mr. Stanisław
- Dominika Kachlik as a cashier
- Daniel Namiotko as a young railway station employee
- Mila Jankowska as Tola
- Żanetta Gruszczyńska as a florist
- Paweł Janyst as a newspaper seller
- Robert Płuszka as Robert, a homeless person
- Lech Dyblik as a veterinarian
- Mirosława Maludzińska as an elderly woman at the market
- Ewa Konstancja Bułhak as station manager woman
- Jan Kardasiński as a delivery person
- Maciej Nawrocki as a waiter
- Robert Koszucki as a board member
- Vergil Smith as a physician
- Iwona Sitkowska as a neighbour
- Beata Chruścińska as Laryska's owner
- Zbigniew Stryj as train driver
- Mateusz Grydlik as a conductor
- Oliwia Durczak as a girl on a train
- Kajetan Styczeń as a boy on a train
- Maciej Makowski as a police officer
- Dagmara Bąk as a police officer
- Patryk Ołdziejewski as a janitor

== Production ==
The film was directed by Magdalena Nieć, written by her together with Katarzyna Gacek, and Mojca Tirš. It was produced by Filip Bałdyga Agnieszka Nejman, Beata Ryczkowska, and Małgorzata Seck, with Beata Pisula as an executive and creative producer, and Anna Wojdat as production manager. It was starred by Liliana Zajbert, Maksymilian Zieliński, Mateusz Damięcki, Monika Pikuła, and Adam Woronowicz. The cinematography was done by Agnieszka Kaczyńska, editing by Tomasz Kolak, music by Maciej Zieliński, and sound mixing by Maciej Amilkiewicz. The scenography was done by Agnieszka Kaczyńska, interior design by Michalina Rydel, costumes by Dzvinka Kukul, and characterisation by Monika Jan-Łechtańska. The film was produced by Canal+ Polska and K&K Selekt Film, and distributed by Kino Świat. It premiered on 6 August 2025 in the Blue City shopping mall in Warsaw, Poland, and was released in cinemas on 8 August.

The film was filmed in Nowy Sącz, including at its railway station and the market square, as well as at the railway station in Żegiestów. The film is a continuation of the 2023 film The Dog Who Travelled by Train, which was loosely based on the 1967 children's book O psie, który jeździł koleją by Roman Pisarski. It itself was based on the life of Lampo, a dog from Campiglia Marittima, Italy, who became famous in the 1950s, by traveling alone by trains across the country. The story in the movie was localised to be set in Poland, unlike the book, which was set in Italy. The events and plot were also changed. Notably, while the dog died at the end of the book, in similar circumstances to his real counterpart, the character in the movie lived.

The movie received the ZAiKS Author Association Award at the 2025 Tauron New Horizons Film Festival in Warsaw.

== Accolades ==
Accolades received by Cars 2
Award	Year	Category	Recipient(s)	Result	Ref.
ZAiKS Author Association Award	2025	—N/a	The Dog Who Travelled by Train 2	Won	
