= The Dog Who Travelled by Train =

2023 film adventure children's film

- Poster
- Directed by: Magdalena Nieć
- Written by: Mojca Tirš; Marcin Siemiątkowski
- Based on: O psie, który jeździł koleją by Roman Pisarski
- Produced by: Beata Ryczkowska; Agnieszka Nejman; Filip Bałdyga
- Starring: Liliana Zajbert; Mateusz Damięcki; Monika Pikuła; Adam Woronowicz
- Cinematography: Andrzej Wojciechowski
- Edited by: Jakub Motylewski
- Music by: Łukasz Pieprzyk
- Production companies: Canal+ Polska; K&K Selekt Film
- Distributed by: Kino Świat
- Release date: 25 August 2023
- Running time: 93 minutes
- Country: Poland
- Language: Polish

The Dog Who Travelled by Train (Polish: O psie, który jeździł koleją), also known as Lampo, the Travelling Dog, and The Traveling Dog, is a 2023 Polish-language adventure children's film directed by Magdalena Nieć and written by Mojca Tirš and Marcin Siemiątkowski. Produced by Canal+ Polska and K&K Selekt Film in Poland, it starred Liliana Zajbert, Mateusz Damięcki, Monika Pikuła, Maksymilian Zielinski and Adam Woronowicz. The film premiered on 25 August 2023. The story revolves around Zuzia, a 10-years-old girl struggling with an illness, befriending a dog named Lampo, who used trains to travel across the country. It was loosely based on 1967 children's book O psie, który jeździł koleją by Roman Pisarski, which in turn was inspired by the life of dog Lampo in the 1950s Italy.

== Plot ==
Zuzia (Liliana Zajbert), is a 10-years-old girl full of hopes and dreams, who struggles with a cardiovascular disease. Her parents, Małorzata (Monika Pikuła) and Piotr (Mateusz Damięcki), do everything they can to bring more happiness to her life. Zusia's father is a station master. Her life changes for a better after she befriends Lampo, a White Swiss Shepherd Dog that uses trains to travel across the country. After she uploaded a video of the dogs travels to the Internet, he becomes a viral sensation. The director of the railway station (Adam Woronowicz), jealous of the dog's fame, tries to get rid of it. After successfully separating them, Zusia'a health begins to deteriorate, and it becomes apparent that only reuniting with her dog will make her feel better again.

== Cast ==
- Liliana Zajbert as Zuzia
- Mateusz Damięcki as Piotr, Zusia's father
- Monika Pikuła as Małgorzata, Zuzia's mother
- Adam Woronowicz as the director of the railway station
- Maksymilian Zieliński as Antek, director's son
- Mila Jankowska as Tola
- Milena Lisiecka as Halina, the lunch lady
- Henryk Niebudek as Mr. Stanisław
- Dominika Kachlik as the waitress
- Daniel Namiotko as a railway station employee
- Joanna Jarmołowicz as a journalist
- Małgorzata Pieczyńska as Joanna
- Dariusz Jakubowski as Tomasz
- Martyna Woźniak as Julka
- Maja Kowalska as Tola's friend
- Krzysztof Oleksyn as Tola's friend
- Michał Rolnicki as an animal control officer
- Piotr Lipko as the senior animal control officer
- Robert Talarczyk as an uncle
- Waleria Gorobets as a volunteer
- Magdalena Nieć as a veterinarian
- Żanetta Gruszczyńska-Ogonowska as a florist
- Jan Nosal as a paperboy
- Robert Płuszka as a homeless person
- Jacek Grondowy as a train conductor
- Piotr Pilitowski as a professor
- Tomira Kowalik as an elderly woman
- Olga Miłaszewska as a health professional
- Bartłomiej Magdziarz as a bank employee
- Jan Kozaczuk as an insurance agent
- Szymon Roszak as the entrepreneur Tomasz
- Elżbieta Jodłowska as a passenger wearing a white fur
- Ewa Pająk as the uncle's neighbour
- Joanna Borer as a passenger in a wheelchair
- Patrycja Durska as a teacher
- Michał Lepak as a gaffer
- Paweł Kumięga as a train passenger at the railway station
- Agata Pruchniewska as a train driver
- Marcin Roykiewicz as a train driver
- Feliks Kleyff as a receptionist
- Gracja Niedźwiedź as a nurse

== Production ==
The film was directed by Magdalena Nieć, written by Mojca Tirš and Marcin Siemiątkowski, and produced by Beata Ryczkowska, Agnieszka Nejman, and Filip Bałdyga. Beata Pisula was an executive producer, and Katarzyna Stegnerska was an associate producer. It was starred by Liliana Zajbert, Mateusz Damięcki, Monika Pikuła, and Adam Woronowicz. Lampo was portrayed by three trained dogs. The cinematography was done by Andrzej Wojciechowski, music by Łukasz Pieprzyk, editing by Jakub Motylewski, scenography by Agnieszka Kaczyńska, Jacek Mocny, and Michalina Rydel, and costumes by Dzvinka Kukul. It was produced by Canal+ Polska and K&K Selekt Film. The film was distributed by Kino Świat. It premiered on 25 August 2023.

The film was filmed in Nowy Sącz, including at its railway station and castle, as well as in Warsaw. Originally the production was set to film at the Przemyśl Główny railway station, however it was changed following the beginning of the Russian invasion of Ukraine in 2022, when it began being used in the evacuation of refugees.

The film is loosely based on the 1967 children's book O psie, który jeździł koleją by Roman Pisarski. It itself was based on the life of Lampo, a dog from Campiglia Marittima, Italy, who became famous in the 1950s, by traveling alone by trains across the country. The story in the movie was localised to be set in Poland, unlike the book, which was set in Italy. The events and plot were also changed. Notably, while the dog died at the end of the book, in similar circumstances to his real counterpart, the character in the movie lived.

== Sequel ==
The sequel to the film, The Dog Who Travelled by Train 2, directed by Magdalena Nieć, premiered on 6 August 2025.
