= Damięcki =

Damięcki is a Polish surname. Notable people with the surname include:

- Grzegorz Damięcki (born 1967), Polish actor
- Mateusz Damięcki (born 1981), Polish actor
