= The Border (2014 TV series) =

Polish crime television series

- Polish: Wataha
- Created by: Wiktor Piątkowski, Kamil Chomiuk, Krzysztof Maćkowski
- Composer: Łukasz Targosz
- Country of origin: Poland
- Original language: Polish
- No. of seasons: 3
- No. of episodes: 18

Production
- Executive producers: Izabela Lopuch; Andrzej Muszyński; Antony Root
- Producers: Artur Kowalewski; Bogumil Lipski; Johnathan Young; Anna Nagler; Grzegorz Olkowski
- Cinematography: Tomasz Augustynek; Tomasz Naumiuk
- Running time: 55 mins. approx.

Original release
- Network: HBO
- Release: October 12, 2014

The Border (Polish: Wataha) is a Polish crime series airing on HBO Poland from 12 October 2014.

== Cast ==
- Leszek Lichota as Wiktor Rebrow
- Aleksandra Popławska as Iga Dobosz
- Andrzej Zieliński as Konrad Markowski
- Bartłomiej Topa as Adam "Grzywa" Grzywaczewski
- Magdalena Popławska as Natalia Tatarkiewicz
- Dagmara Bąk as Aga Małek
- Jarosław Boberek as Wojciech Świtalski
- Maciej Mikołajczyk as Piotr "Rambo" Wójcik
- Jacek Lenartowicz as Michał Łuczak
- Mariusz Saniternik as Kalita
- Jacek Beler as Cinek
- Julia Pogrebińska as Ewa Wityńska
- Jacek Koman as Robert Korda
- Piotr Dąbrowski as Rebrow
- Grzegorz Damięcki as Krzysztof Halman
- Anita Jancia as Marta Siwa
- Anna Donchenko as Alsu Karimowa
- Żora Liścienko as Halid
- Piotr Żurawski as Sylwester Wiśniak
- Borys Połunin as Cień
- Marek Kalita as Igi Dobosz
- Weronika Humaj as Joanna Zięba
- Piotr Chlewicki as Aziukiewicz
- Michał Kaleta as Igi Dobosz
- Matylda Damięcka as Boczarska's guardian
- Karol Bernacki as the guardian of "Sema"
- Filip Gurłacz as Marcin Gauza
- Robert Wabich as Waldek
- Małgorzata Hajewska-Krzysztofik as Krystyna
- Helena Norowicz as Helena
- Artur Janusiak as Tomek
- Dariusz Siastacz as the deputy minister

== Episodes ==
Season	Episodes	Originally released	
Season	Episodes	First released	Last released
1	6	October 12, 2014	November 16, 2014
2	6	October 15, 2017	November 19, 2017
3	6	December 6, 2019	January 10, 2020

== Production ==
The filming of the first season took place between September and December 2013 in Bieszczady, a mountain range in the Carpathians. The second season was filmed there from October 2016 to February 2017. The show was broadcast in nineteen European countries by HBO Europe alongside other broadcasters.

In June 2016, the British broadcaster Channel 4 aired the first season in English under the title The Border. HBO Europe showed it at the Series Mania Festival in Paris.

On 17 December 2018, it was announced that the series would receive a third season, scheduled to premiere in 2019. On 13 September it was announced that the premiere would take place on 30 October, however on 26 September it was postponed to 6 December.
