= The Defence (TV series) =

Polish crime drama television series

- Also known as: The Disappearance
- Polish: Chyłka
- Genre: Crime drama; Legal drama
- Based on: Chyłka series by Remigiusz Mróz
- Written by: Dorota Chamczyk; Daria Rogozińska; Justyna Stefaniak; Michał Wawrzecki; Krzysztof Szpetmański
- Directed by: Łukasz Palkowski; Marek Wróbel
- Starring: Magdalena Cielecka; Filip Pławiak; Piotr Żurawski; Jakub Gierszał; Szymon Bobrowski; Ireneusz Czop
- Composer: Bartosz Chajdecki
- Country of origin: Poland
- Original language: Polish
- No. of seasons: 5
- No. of episodes: 32

Production
- Executive producer: Violetta Furmaniuk-Zaorska
- Producer: Dorota Chamczyk
- Cinematography: Mateusz Wichłacz
- Editors: Paweł Witecki; Marcin Kot Bastkowski; Wojciech Mrówczyński; Jan Kidawa-Błoński Jr.
- Running time: 40–49 minutes
- Production company: TVN

Original release
- Network: TVN; Player
- Release: 26 December 2018 – January 4, 2022

The Defence (also known as The Disappearance; Polish: Chyłka) is a Polish crime drama television series based on the Chyłka book series by Remigiusz Mróz. It aired on TVN and Player from 26 December 2018 to 4 January 2022.

== Premise ==
In the village of Sajenek in Augustów, Angelika and Dawid Szlezyngier are horrified to find that their three-year-old daughter has gone missing. Since they are the prime suspects, Angelika contacts her old friend, Attorney Joanna Chyłka, to help defend them.

== Cast ==
=== Main ===
- Magdalena Cielecka as Joanna Chyłka
- Filip Pławiak as Kordian "Zordon" Oryński
- Piotr Żurawski as "Kormak"
- Jakub Gierszał as Piotr Langer Jr.
- Szymon Bobrowski as Artur Żelazny
- Ireneusz Czop as Commissioner Szczerbiński

=== Recurring ===
- Jacek Koman as Harry McVay
- Olga Bołądź as Magda, Joanna's sister
- Helena Zawistowska as Daria, Magda's daughter and Joanna's niece
- Szymon Piotr Warszawski as Prosecutor Olgierd "Paderborn" Paderewski
- Cezary Pazura as Feliks
- Piotr Stramowski as Adam Kosmowski
- Katarzyna Warnke as Angelika Szlezyngier
- Michał Żurawski as Dawid Szlezyngier
- Piotr Głowacki as Prosecutor Zbigniew Aronowicz
- Andrij Zhuravsky as Sakrat Tatrnikow
- Mirosław Baka as Antoni Ekiel
- Mirosław Haniszewski as "Wito"
- Artur Żmijewski as Piotr Langer Sr.
- Jerzy Schejbal as Filip Obertał, Joanna and Magda's father
- Maciej Mikołajczyk as Sergeant Jacek Satanowski
- Milana Glinka as Nikola Szlezyngier
- Katarzyna Hołtra as Monia
- Agnieszka Czekańska as the judge
- Olgierd Łukaszewicz as "Siwowłosy"
- Marcin Bosak as Prosecutor Karol Rejchert
- Tomasz Schuchardt as "Gorzym"
- Cezary Łukaszewicz as Dr. Maciej Roske
- Milena Suszyńska as Agnieszka Powirska
- Wojciech Zieliński as Robert "Bukano" Horwat
- Antoni Pawlicki as Krzysztof Piotrowski
- Mariusz Bonaszewski as Lew Buchelt
- Małgorzata Klara as Prosecutor Maria Zakierska
- Marek Pyś as Miecio
- Monika Pikuła as Maria Terpińska
- Jacek Poniedziałek as Paweł Messer
- Cezary Kosiński as Judge Tatarek
- Zbigniew Suszyński as Lipczyński, Przemka's father
- Adam Ferency as Tadeusz Tesarewicz
- Jan Englert as Prosecutor Bauman

== Episodes ==
=== Series overview ===
Series	Episodes	Originally released		
Series	Episodes	First released	Last released	Network
1	7	26 December 2018	23 January 2019	TVN; Player
2	6	15 November 2019	13 December 2019	TVN; Player
3	7	6 October 2020	10 November 2020	TVN; Player
4	6	23 February 2021	23 March 2021	TVN; Player
5	6	30 November 2021	4 January 2022	TVN; Player

=== Season 1: Zaginięcie ===
No. overall	No. in season	Title	Duration	Original release date
1	1	"Episode 1.1"	43 min	26 December 2018
2	2	"Episode 1.2"	45 min	26 December 2018
3	3	"Episode 1.3"	45 min	26 December 2018
4	4	"Episode 1.4"	42 min	2 January 2019
5	5	"Episode 1.5"	42 min	9 January 2019
6	6	"Episode 1.6"	41 min	16 January 2019
7	7	"Episode 1.7"	44 min	23 January 2019

=== Season 2: Kasacja ===
No. overall	No. in season	Title	Duration	Original release date
8	1	"Episode 2.1"	49 min	15 November 2019
9	2	"Episode 2.2"	45 min	15 November 2019
10	3	"Episode 2.3"	44 min	22 November 2019
11	4	"Episode 2.4"	44 min	29 November 2019
12	5	"Episode 2.5"	42 min	6 December 2019
13	6	"Episode 2.6"	46 min	13 December 2019

=== Season 3: Rewizja ===
No. overall	No. in season	Title	Duration	Original release date
14	1	"Episode 3.1"	45 min	6 October 2020
15	2	"Episode 3.2"	44 min	6 October 2020
16	3	"Episode 3.3"	45 min	13 October 2020
17	4	"Episode 3.4"	46 min	20 October 2020
18	5	"Episode 3.5"	42 min	27 October 2020
19	6	"Episode 3.6"	45 min	3 November 2020
20	7	"Episode 3.7"	42 min	10 November 2020

=== Season 4: Inwigilacja ===
No. overall	No. in season	Title	Duration	Original release date
21	1	"Episode 4.1"	43 min	23 February 2021
22	2	"Episode 4.2"	44 min	23 February 2021
23	3	"Episode 4.3"	42 min	2 March 2021
24	4	"Episode 4.4"	44 min	9 March 2021
25	5	"Episode 4.5"	42 min	16 March 2021
26	6	"Episode 4.6"	43 min	23 March 2021

=== Season 5: Oskarżenie ===
No. overall	No. in season	Title	Duration	Original release date
27	1	"Episode 5.1"	43 min	30 November 2021
28	2	"Episode 5.2"	42 min	6 December 2021
29	3	"Episode 5.3"	42 min	14 December 2021
30	4	"Episode 5.4"	40 min	21 December 2021
31	5	"Episode 5.5"	40 min	28 December 2021
32	6	"Episode 5.6"	44 min	4 January 2022

== Production ==
The series was filmed in Warsaw as well as Augustów, Białystok, Suwałki, and Kolno in the Podlaskie Voivodeship.

== Awards and nominations ==
Year	Award	Category	Nominee	Result	Ref.
2020	Polish Film Awards	Best TV Series	Chyłka. Kasacja	Nominated	
2020	Polish Film Awards	Best TV Series	Chyłka. Zaginięcie	Nominated	
2021	Polish Film Awards	Best TV Series	Chyłka. Rewizja	Nominated	
