= Lampo (dog) =

Dog that became famous for his rail journeys across Italy

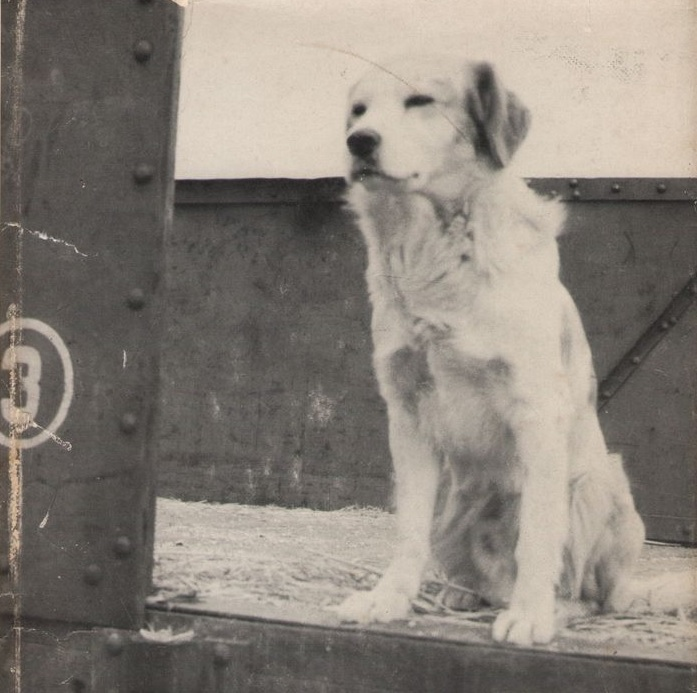
- Dog Lampo.
- Species: domestic dog
- Breed: mongrel
- Sex: Male
- Born: circa 1950
- Died: 22 July 1961; Campiglia Marittima, Italy
- Resting place: Campiglia Marittima, Italy
- Owner: Elvio Barlettani

Lampo (Italian: [ˈlam.po]; c. 1950 – 22 July 1961) was a mixed-breed dog that became famous for his rail journeys across Italy.

== History ==
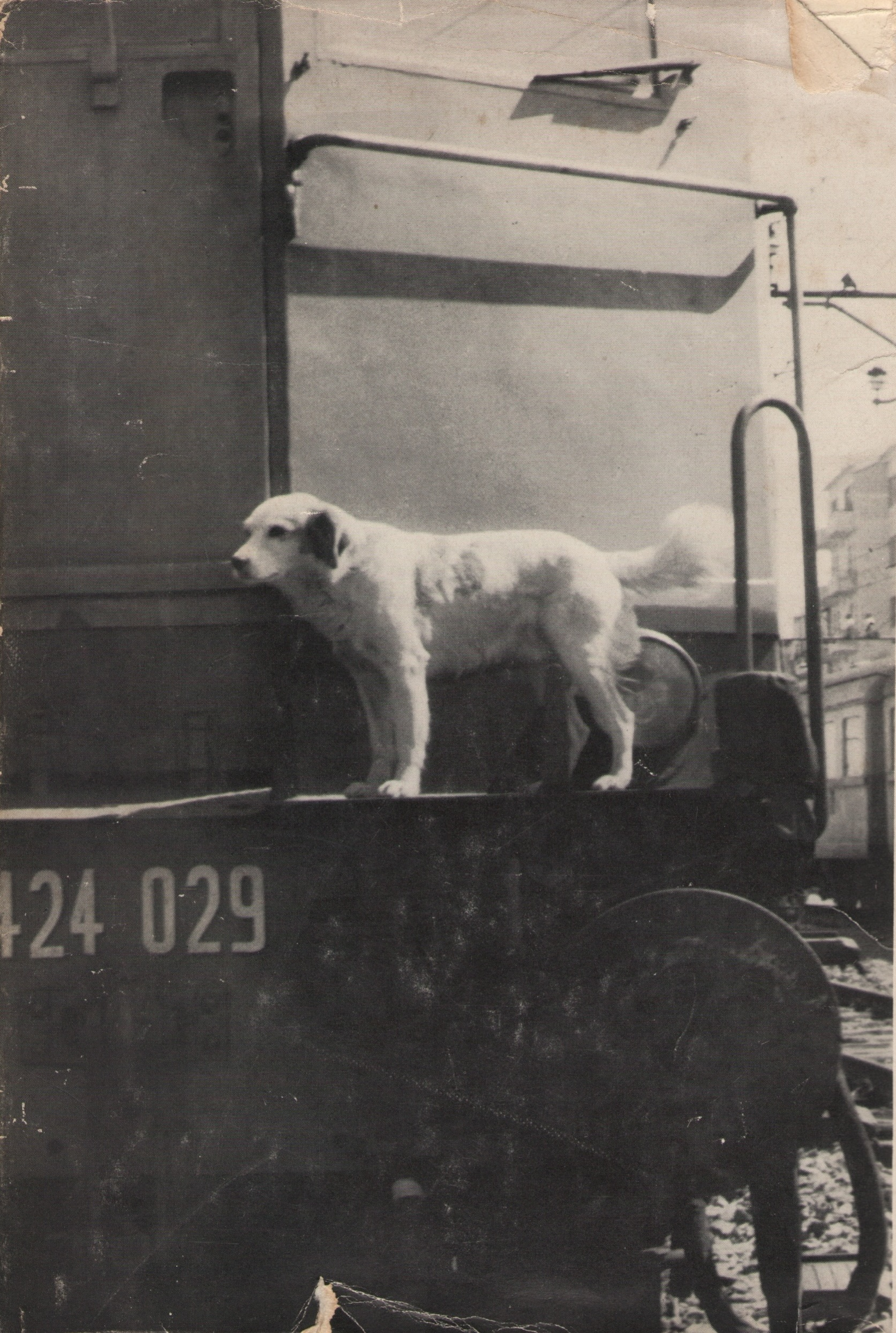
Lampo on the locomotive.

In August 1953, Lampo, then a stray dog, got off a cargo train at the Campiglia Marittima railway station in Italy and was adopted by the stationmaster Elvio Barlettani, despite the strict rail regulations against it. Soon the dog had learned the train schedules, distinguishing the slow trains from the fast ones and how to get somewhere every day and return at sunset. Almost every morning, he traveled by train from Campiglia Marittima to Piombino to accompany Mirna, the stationmaster's daughter, on her way to school. He then would return to Campiglia Marittima on a different train. He often boarded other trains, traversing by himself across the Italian railroad network, always returning to Campiglia Marittima.

After a few years, the railway management in Florence forced Barlettani to remove the dog. Lampo was put on a cargo train to Naples, but he returned after a few days. Later he was given to a friend of the stationmaster in Barletta. After about five months, the dog returned to Campiglia Marittima, where he officially became the mascot of the railway station. His story intrigued journalists around the world, who dedicated television services, articles, and covers to his story.

On the evening of 22 July 1961, Lampo was fatally hit by the cargo train in Campiglia Marittima. He was buried in the flowerbed at the foot of an acacia tree at the railway station.

== Commemoration ==
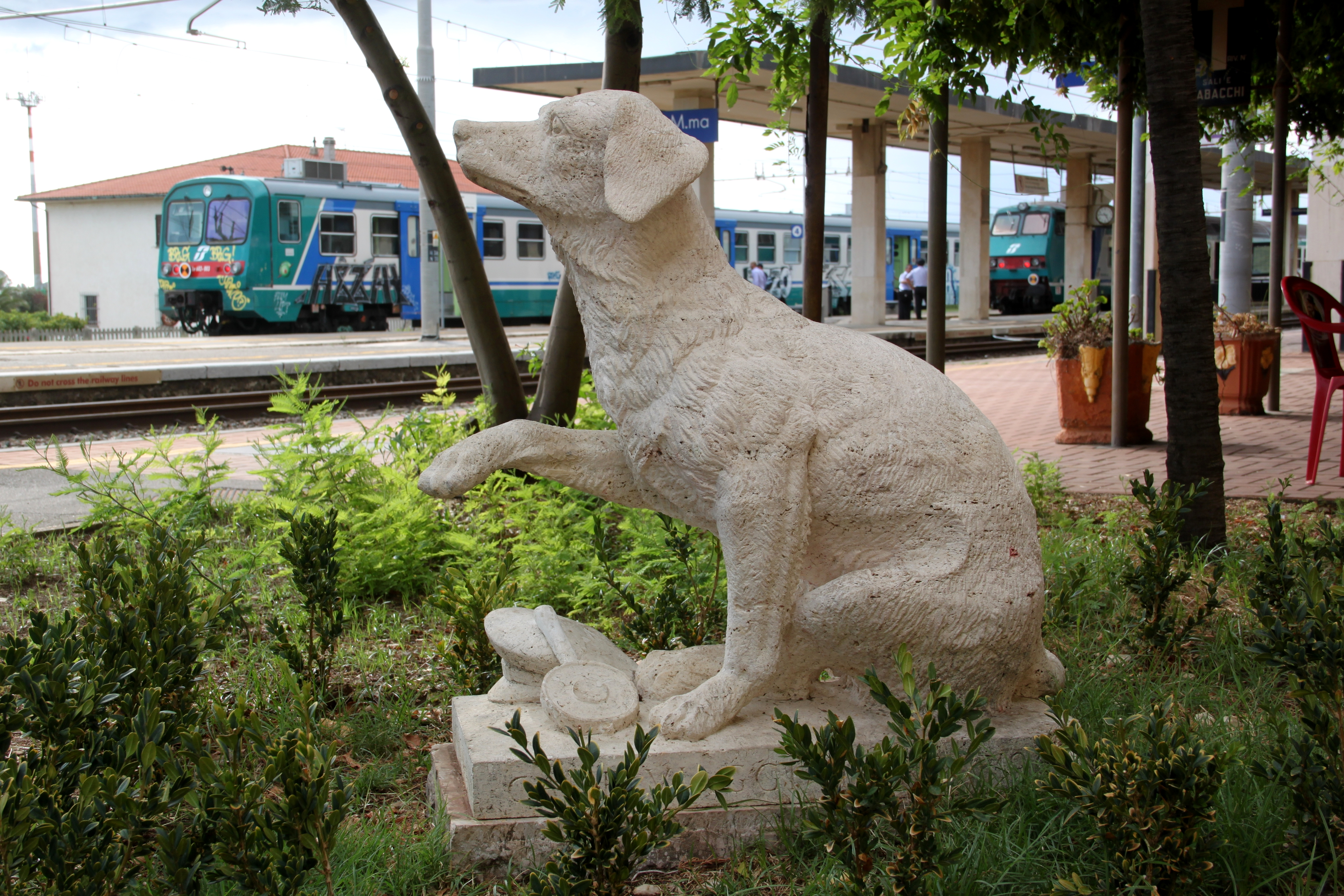
Monument of Lampo at the Campiglia Marittima railway station.

Shortly after his death, thanks to railway workers and the American magazine This Week, a monument was inaugurated at the Campiglia Marittima railway station in memory of Lampo.

In 1962 the book Lampo, the Traveling Dog (Italian: Lampo, il cane viaggiatore) was written by the stationmaster, Elvio Barlettani (died July 2006). The Garzanti publishing house published the book. It became successful with about fifteen editions until 2009 and has been translated into English, French, German, Japanese and Bengali.

In 1967, the story of Lampo was fictionalized by the Polish writer Roman Pisarski in the short story O psie, który jeździł koleją (from Polish: About the dog that traveled by train) that has become school reading in the third grade classes of primary schools in Poland.

In 2023 was premiered The Dog Who Travelled by Train a 2023 Polish-language adventure children's film directed by Magdalena Nieć, follewed in 2025 by the sequel The Dog Who Travelled by Train 2.

== Bibliography ==
- Lampo, the Traveling Dog by Elvio Barlettani, Garzanti, 1962.

== Filmography ==
- Lampo, cane viaggiatore, 1962.
- Il cane viaggiatore by Simone Paradisi, 2011

== See also ==
- Eclipse, a dog who would take city buses alone
