= The Woods (miniseries) =

2020 Polish mystery thriller miniseries

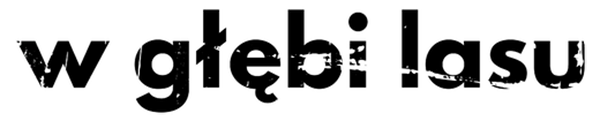
- Polish: W głębi lasu
- Genre: Crime drama; Mystery; Thriller
- Created by: Harlan Coben
- Based on: The Woods by Harlan Coben
- Written by: Agata Malesińska; Wojciech Miłoszewski
- Directed by: Leszek Dawid; Bartosz Konopka
- Starring: Grzegorz Damięcki; Agnieszka Grochowska; Hubert Miłkowski; Wiktoria Filus
- Music by: Łukasz Targosz
- Country of origin: Poland
- Original language: Polish
- No. of seasons: 1
- No. of episodes: 6

Production
- Executive producers: Andrzej Muszyński; Harlan Coben
- Running time: 46–55 minutes
- Production company: ATM Grupa

Original release
- Network: Netflix
- Release: 12 June 2020

The Woods (Polish: W głębi lasu) is a Polish mystery thriller television miniseries, based on the 2007 novel of the same name by Harlan Coben. The series premiered on Netflix on 12 June 2020. It is the second Polish-language series produced for Netflix, after 1983.

== Synopsis ==
The story unfolds in two different time periods: August 1994 and September 2019. In 2019, Warsaw prosecutor Paweł Kopiński is called upon to identify the body of a murder victim who was found with newspaper clippings about him. The murder seems to be linked to the August 1994 summer camp where Paweł was a chaperone, during which two people were murdered and two others—including his sister Kamila—disappeared.

== Cast ==
=== Main ===
- Grzegorz Damięcki as Paweł Kopiński (2019)
- Agnieszka Grochowska as Laura Goldsztajn (2019)
- Hubert Miłkowski as Paweł Kopiński (1994)
- Wiktoria Filus as Laura Goldsztajn (1994)
- Jacek Koman as Dawid Goldsztajn
- Ewa Skibińska as Natalia Kopińska
- Magdalena Czerwińska as Małgorzata Tatarczuk
- Adam Ferency as police officer in charge of the case in 1994
- Przemysław Bluszcz as Bogdan Perkowski
- Dorota Kolak as Chief Prosecutor Herman
- Izabela Dąbrowska as Bożena Perkowska

=== Recurring ===
- Piotr Głowacki as Inspector Kosiński
- Cezary Pazura as Krzysztof Dunaj-Szafrański
- Arkadiusz Jakubik as Inspector Maciej Jork
- Adam Wietrzyński as Artur Perkowski
- Jakub Gola as Daniel Kotler
- Martyna Byczkowska as Kamila Kopińska
- Kinga Jasik as Monika Sowik
- Krzysztof Zarzecki as Wojciech Malczak

== Episodes ==
No.	Title	Directed by	Written by	Original release date
1	"End of Innocence" "Koniec niewinności"	Leszek Dawid	Agata Malesińska	12 June 2020
2	"Lies" "Kłamstwa"	Leszek Dawid	Agata Malesińska	12 June 2020
3	"You Know Nothing" "Nic nie wiesz"	Leszek Dawid	Agata Malesińska	12 June 2020
4	"What Lies Beneath" "Czego oczy nie widzą"	Bartosz Konopka	Wojciech Miłoszewski	12 June 2020
5	"Your Sister Is Dead" "Twoja siostra nie żyje"	Bartosz Konopka	Agata Malesińska	12 June 2020
6	"Long Way Home" "Długa droga do domu"	Bartosz Konopka	Wojciech Miłoszewski	12 June 2020

== Production ==
In August 2018, Netflix signed a five-year contract to adapt fourteen crime novels by Harlan Coben. In December 2019, ATM Grupa announced that it had wrapped up filming of the series and that it would be released on Netflix in 2020. The Woods is the second Polish-language series made for the streaming platform and the fourth Netflix production created by Coben, following The Five, Safe, and The Stranger.
