= Liliana Zajbert =

Polish actress (born 2009)

- Born: 2009 (age 16–17)
- Occupations: Actress, dancer

Liliana Zajbert (Polish: [liˈlja.na ˈzaj.bɛrt]; born 2009) is a Polish film, television, and stage actress, and dancer. She starred as Zuzia, the leading character in the 2023 adventure children's film The Dog Who Travelled by Train, and its 2025 continuation, The Dog Who Travelled by Train 2.

== Biography ==
Liliana Zajbert was born in 2009. She began her performing career as a dancer in a children's folk dance group, and later acting on stage. Zajbert appeared in several television series, including Komisarz Alex (2020), Raven (2021), Hold Tight (2022), Rafi (2023), Mecenas Porada (2023), and Na sygnale (2023). She starred with a leading role of Zuzia, in the 2023 adventure children's film The Dog Who Travelled by Train, and its 2025 continuation, The Dog Who Travelled by Train 2.

== Filmography ==
=== Films ===
| Year | Title | Role | Notes |
|---|---|---|---|
| 2023 | The Dog Who Travelled by Train | Zuzia | Leading role; feature film |
| 2024 | Wagary | Sara | Short film |
| 2025 | The Dog Who Travelled by Train 2 | Zuzia | Leading role; feature film |
| 2025 | Oktawa | Amanda | Short film |

=== Television series ===
| Year | Title | Role | Notes |
|---|---|---|---|
| 2020 | Komisarz Alex | Asia | Episode: "Kuchnia Rity" |
| 2021 | Raven | Girl | Episode no. 5 |
| 2022 | Hold Tight | Jaśmina's friend | Episode no. 1 |
| 2023 | Rafi | Ada Ziajska | Episode no. 9 |
| 2023 | Mecenas Porada | Marysia Gawryś | Episode: "Kup sobie pluszaka" |
| 2023 | Na sygnale | Zuzia | Episode: "Bunt materii" |

=== Polish-language dubbing ===
| Year | Title | Role | Notes |
|---|---|---|---|
| 2024 | Erik Stoneheart | Maria | Feature film; original released in 2022 |
