= Remigiusz Mróz =

Polish writer (born 1987)

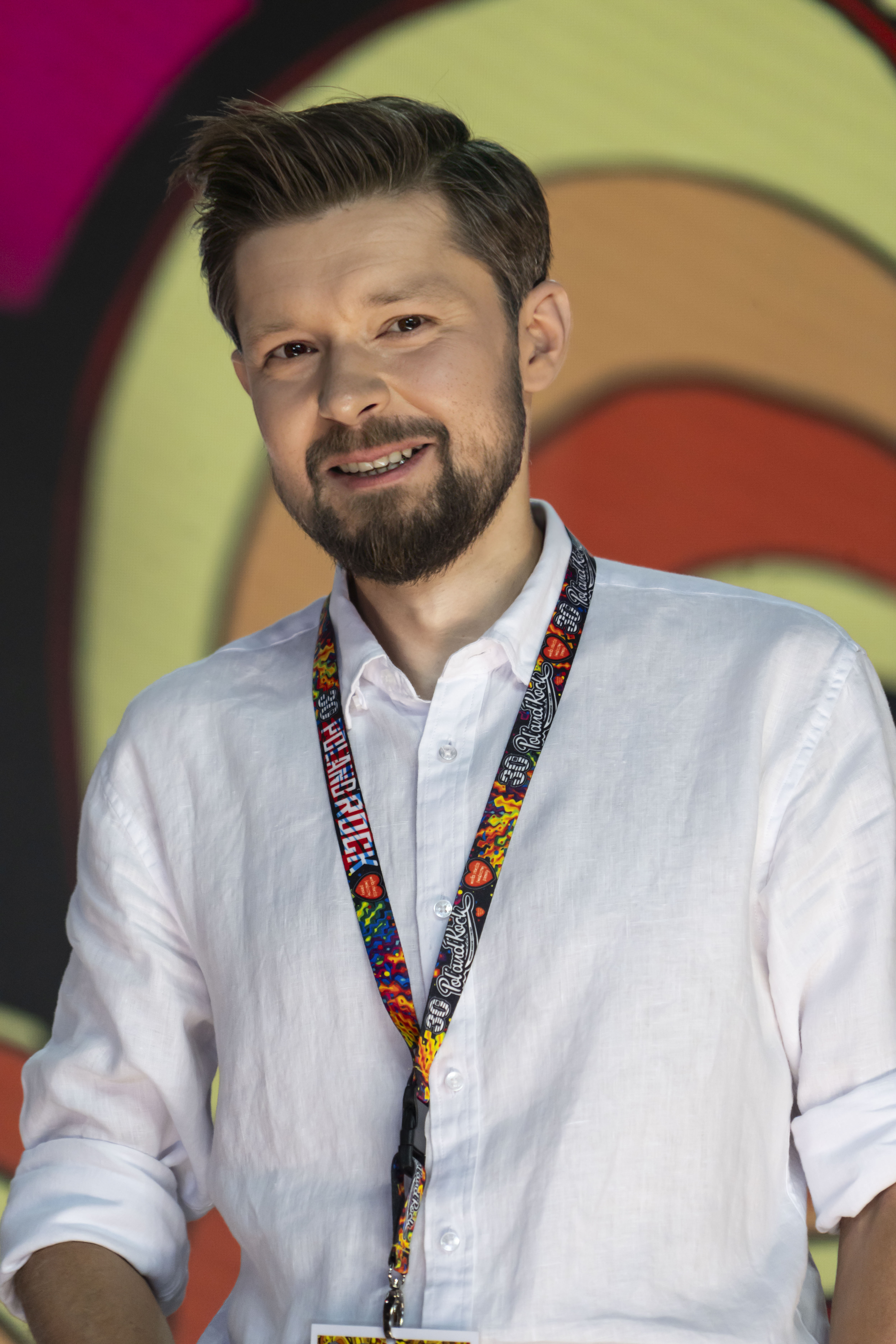
- Mróz in 2024
- Born: 15 January 1987 (age 39); Opole, Poland
- Education: Kozminski University
- Occupation: Novelist
- Writing career
- Pen name: Ove Løgmansbø
- Period: 2013–present

Remigiusz Mróz (Polish pronunciation: [rɛˈmiɡjuʂ ˈmruz]; born 15 January 1987, Opole, Poland) is a Polish writer and lawyer. He is considered a popular and prolific author having published 46 novels since his first books appeared in 2013. As of late 2023, his books have sold 10 million copies.

== Life ==
Remigiusz Mróz went to high school in Opole and attended college at Leon Kozminski University in Warsaw, where he studied law. He is also the author of numerous research studies.

== Works ==
Mróz has written in different genres including crime, legal thrillers, and science fiction. He was recognized as the most popular contemporary Polish author by the 2017 and 2018 National Reading Survey. In 2019 he became the most popular author in Poland, surpassing Stephen King and Polish Nobel Prize winners. He stayed on the first place in 2020, 2021 and 2022. His books are bestsellers in the Polish publishing market, and his suspenseful work gets compared to Stephen King and Alfred Hitchcock.

He has written a number of book series, including the series featuring Joanna Chyłka, which has been made into the series The Defence starring Magdalena Cielecka on TVN and Max, and featuring Wiktor Forst, which was adapted by Netflix into Detective Forst. The latter series become an instant hit and one of the most popular shows on the streaming service, climbing to the position of third most watched series globally a few days after the premiere and gathering nearly five million viewers.

TVN have also adapted another author's novel The Behaviorist, while Polsat brought The Vote of no Confidence to screen.

Other series are also in development for screen adaptation, including I Forgive You by the Polish Oscar-nominated film studio Opus Film, The Chorus of Forgotten Voices by The Witcher production company Platige Image, Seweryn Zaorski series by Aktiv Media, One-Touch, Black Madonna, and Never Found.

Mróz was the first Polish writer to receive two nominations for the Great Caliber Award at the International Detective Story Festival for Kasacja (Final Appeal) and Zaginięcie (Disappearance). The first won the Reader's Choice Award. This series of novels focused on lawyer Joanna Chyłka have sold over 1.5 million copies in Poland.

He has also written three novels set in the Faroe Islands under the pen name Ove Løgmansbø.

He made his debut in English with Final Appeal – the book was released on January 4 in the UK and on February 6 in the US.

=== Joanna Chyłka series ===
1. Kasacja (Final Appeal), Wydawnictwo Czwarta Strona, Poznań 2015
2. Zaginięcie (Disappearance), Wydawnictwo Czwarta Strona, Poznań 2015
3. Rewizja (Revision), Wydawnictwo Czwarta Strona, Poznań 2016
4. Immunitet (Immunity), Wydawnictwo Czwarta Strona, Poznań 2016
5. Inwigilacja (Invigilation), Wydawnictwo Czwarta Strona, Poznań 2017
6. Oskarżenie (Accusation), Wydawnictwo Czwarta Strona, Poznań 2017
7. Testament (Last Will), Wydawnictwo Czwarta Strona, Poznań 2018
8. Kontratyp (Justification), Wydawnictwo Czwarta Strona, Poznań 2018
9. Umorzenie (Remission), Wydawnictwo Czwarta Strona, Poznań 2019
10. Wyrok (Verdict), Wydawnictwo Czwarta Strona, Poznań 2019
11. Ekstradycja (Extradition), Wydawnictwo Czwarta Strona, Poznań 2020
12. Precedens (Precedent), Wydawnictwo Czwarta Strona, Poznań 2020
13. Afekt (Affect), Wydawnictwo Czwarta Strona, Poznań 2021
14. Egzekucja (Execution), Wydawnictwo Czwarta Strona, Poznań 2021
15. Skazanie (Conviction), Wydawnictwo Czwarta Strona, Poznań 2022
16. Werdykt (Verdict), Wydawnictwo Czwarta Strona, Poznań 2022
17. Zarzut (Plea), Wydawnictwo Czwarta Strona, Poznań 2023
18. Obrona (Defense), Wydawnictwo Czwarta Strona, Poznań 2024
19. Substytucja (Substitution), Wydawnictwo Czwarta Strona, Poznań 2025

=== Forst series ===
1. Ekspozycja (Exposure), Wydawnictwo Filia, Poznań 2015
2. Przewieszenie (Overhang), Wydawnictwo Filia, Poznań 2016
3. Trawers (Traverse), Wydawnictwo Filia, Poznań 2016
4. Deniwelacja (Denivelation), Wydawnictwo Filia, Poznań 2017
5. Zerwa (Rockslide), Wydawnictwo Filia, Poznań 2018
6. Halny (Foehn), Wydawnictwo Filia, Poznań 2020
7. Przepaść (Abyss), Wydawnictwo Filia, Poznań 2021
8. Widmo Brockenu (Spectre of the Brocken), Wydawnictwo Filia, Poznań 2023
9. Berdo, Wydawnictwo Filia, Poznań 2024
10. Kasprowy, Wydawnictwo Filia, Poznań 2025

=== Parabellum trilogy ===
1. Prędkość ucieczki (Escape Velocity), Instytut Wydawniczy Erica, Warszawa 2013
2. Horyzont zdarzeń (Event Horizon), Instytut Wydawniczy Erica, Warszawa 2014
3. Głębia osobliwości (Depth of Singularity), Wydawnictwo Czwarta Strona, Poznań 2016

=== W kręgach władzy (In the Circles of Power) series ===
1. Wotum nieufności (Vote of no Confidence), Wydawnictwo Filia, Poznań 2017
2. Większość bezwzględna (Absolute Majority), Wydawnictwo Filia, Poznań 2017
3. Władza absolutna (Absolute Power), Wydawnictwo Filia, Poznań 2018

=== Damian Werner series ===
1. Nieodnaleziona (Never Found), Wydawnictwo Filia, Poznań 2018
2. Nieodgadniona (Never Known), Wydawnictwo Filia, Poznań 2019

=== Piotr Langer series ===
1. Langer, Wydawnictwo Czwarta Strona, 2023
2. Paderborn, Wydawnictwo Czwarta Strona, 2024
3. Ozyrys, Wydawnictwo Czwarta Strona, 2025

=== Projekt RIESE (Project Riese) series ===
1. Projekt Riese (Project Riese), Wydawnictwo Filia, Poznań 2022
2. Operacja Mir (Operation Mir), Wydawnictwo Filia, Poznań 2024

=== Seweryn Zaorski series ===
1. Listy zza grobu (Letters from Beyond the Grave), Wydawnictwo Filia, Poznań 2019
2. Głosy z zaświatów (The Voices from the Nether World), Wydawnictwo Filia, Poznań 2020
3. Szepty spoza nicości (Whispers from beyond nothingness), Wydawnictwo Filia, Poznań 2021
4. Obrazy z przeszłości (Pictures from the Past), Wydawnictwo Filia, Poznań 2022
5. Światła w popiołach (Lights in the Ashes), Wydawnictwo Filia, Poznań 2023
6. Cienie pośród mroku (Shadows Among the Darkness), Wydawnictwo Filia, Poznań 2024

=== Ina Kobryn series ===
- Wybaczam ci (I Forgive You), Wydawnictwo Czwarta Strona, Poznań 2021
- Nie ufaj mu (Don't Trust Him), Wydawnictwo Czwarta Strona, Poznań 2022

=== Gerard Edling series ===
1. Behawiorysta (The Behaviorist), Wydawnictwo Filia, Poznań 2016
2. Iluzjonista (The Illusionist), Wydawnictwo Filia, Poznań 2019
3. Ekstremista (The Extremist), Wydawnictwo Filia, Poznań 2021
4. Kabalista (The Cabalist), Wydawnictwo Filia, Poznań 2023

=== Chór zapomnianych głosów (The Choir of Forgotten Voices) series ===
1. Chór zapomnianych głosów (The Choir of Forgotten Voices), Wydawnictwo Genius Creations, Bydgoszcz 2014
2. Echo z otchłani (The Echo from the Abyss), Wydawnictwo Czwarta Strona, Poznań 2020

=== Novels published as Ove Løgmansbø – Trilogy from the Faroe Islands ===
1. Enklawa (The Enclave), Wydawnictwo Dolnośląskie, 2016
2. Połów (The Haul), Wydawnictwo Dolnośląskie, 2016
3. Prom (The Ferry), Wydawnictwo Dolnośląskie, 2017

=== Other novels ===
- Wieża milczenia (The Tower of Silence), Wydawnictwo Damidos, Katowice 2013
- Turkusowe szale (Turquoise Shawls), Wydawnictwo Bellona, Warszawa 2014
- W cieniu prawa (In the Shadow of the Law), Wydawnictwo Czwarta Strona, Poznań 2016
- Świt, który nie nadejdzie (The Dawn That Will Never Come), Wydawnictwo Czwarta Strona, Poznań 2016
- Czarna Madonna (Black Madonna), Wydawnictwo Czwarta Strona, Poznań 2017
- Hashtag, Wydawnictwo Czwarta Strona, Poznań 2018
- Lot 202 (Flight 202), Wydawnictwo Filia, Poznań 2020
- Osiedle RZNiW (Harvest Estate), Wydawnictwo Czwarta Strona, Poznań 2020
- Z pierwszej piłki (From the first kick), Wydawnictwo Filia, Poznań 2022
- Bezkarny (Unpunished), Wydawnictwo Filia, Poznań 2025

=== Other ===
- Rewers (Reverse), Opracowanie zbiorowe, 2016
- Księgarenka przy ulicy Wiśniowej (The Little Bookshop on Cherry Street), Opracowanie zbiorowe, Wydawnictwo Filia, 2016
- Zabójczy pocisk (Deadly bullet), Opracowanie zbiorowe, Wydawnictwo Skarpa Warszawska, 2018
- Inne Światy (Other Worlds), Opracowanie zbiorowe, Wydawnictwo Czwarta Strona, 2018
- O pisaniu na chłodno (Coldly About Writing), Wydawnictwo Czwarta Strona, Poznań 2018

== See also ==
- List of Polish writers
- Polish literature
- Marek Krajewski
- Joanna Chmielewska
