= Joanna Chmielewska =

Polish novelist and screenwriter

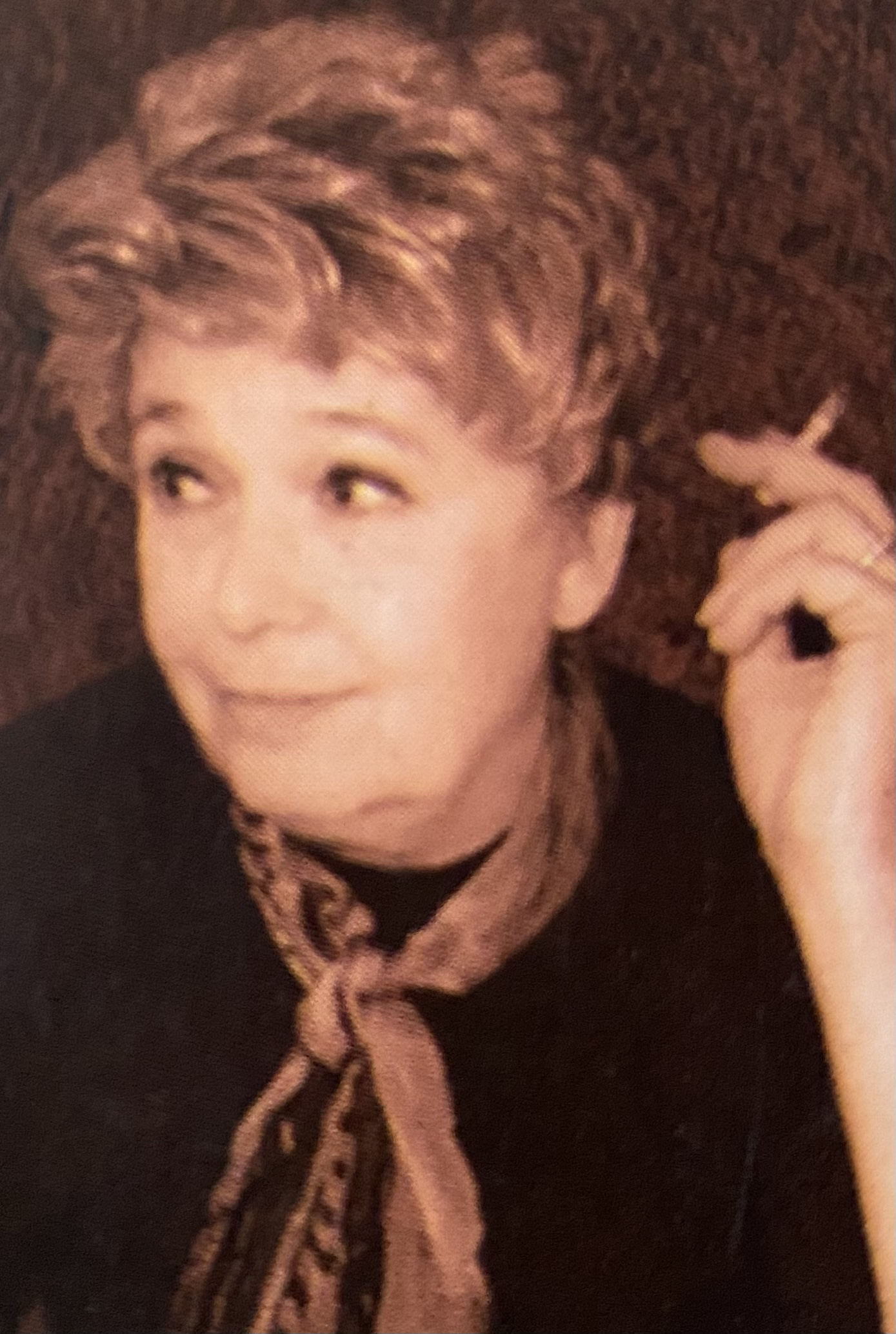
- Born: Irena Becker; 2 April 1932; Warsaw, Warsaw Voivodeship, Second Polish Republic
- Died: 7 October 2013 (aged 81); Warsaw, Masovian Voivodeship, Third Polish Republic
- Resting place: Powązki Cemetery
- Citizenship: Polish
- Education: Warsaw University of Technology
- Occupation: novelist
- Writing career
- Period: 1964-2013
- Genre: Crime fiction
- Notable works: Całe zdanie nieboszczyka Wszystko czerwone Wszyscy jesteśmy podejrzani
- Website: chmielewska.pl

Signature
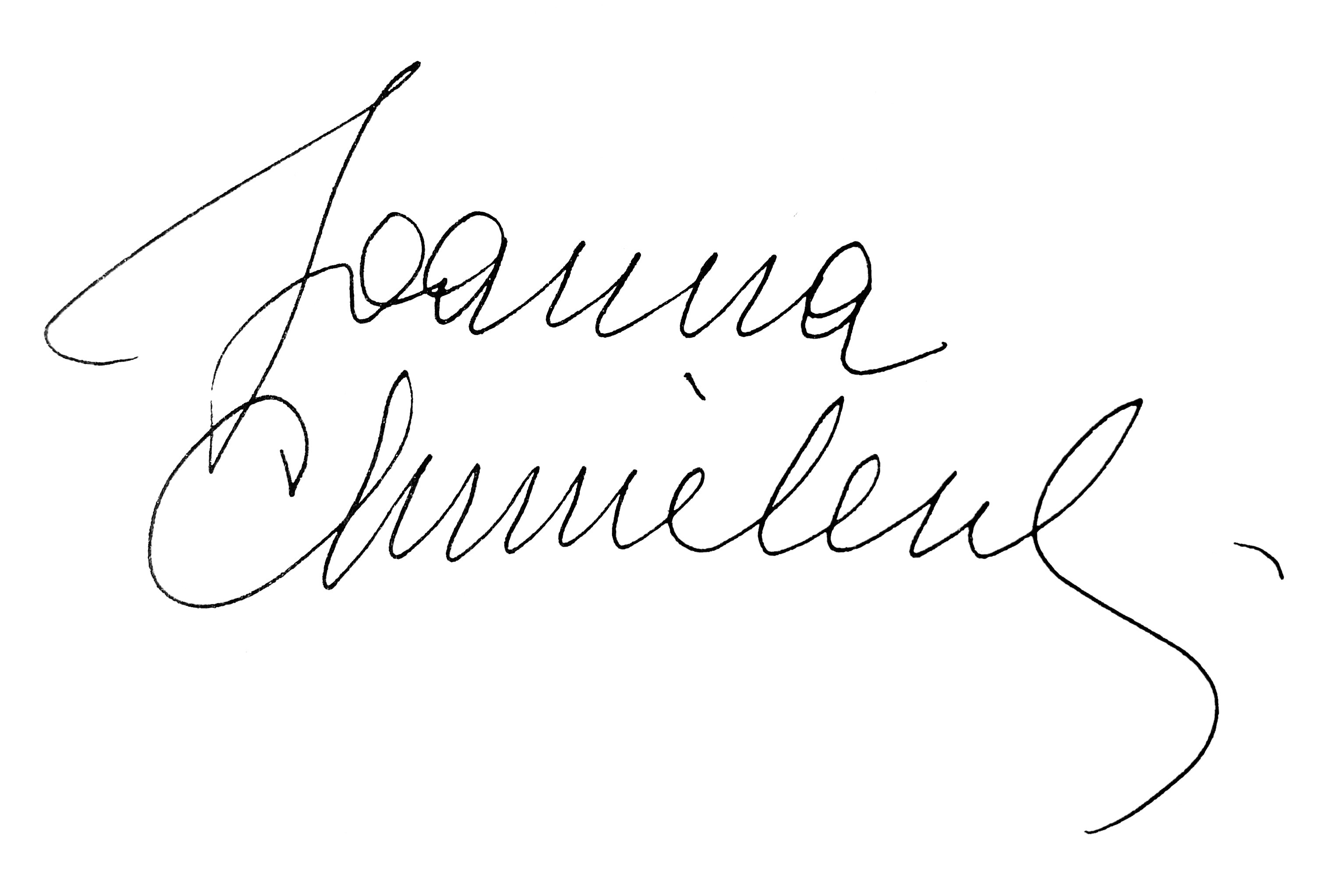

Joanna Chmielewska (Polish: [jɔˈanna xmjɛˈlɛfska]; 2 April 1932 – 7 October 2013), was the pen name of Irena Kühn (née Becker), a Polish novelist and screenwriter. Her work is often described as "ironic detective stories". Her novels, which have been translated into at least eleven languages, have sold more than 6 million copies in Poland and over 10 million copies in Russia.

== Life and career ==
Born in Warsaw in 1932, Chmielewska graduated as an architect in 1954 from Warsaw University of Technology, and worked as a designer before devoting herself to writing. Her first short story was published in the popular magazine Kultura i Życie (transl. Culture and Life) in 1958 and her first novel, Klin (transl. The Wedge), in 1964. She loved horse races and gambling: both hobbies are mentioned extensively in her books. She was also a connoisseur of amber, a passion which forms the basis for her 1998 novel Złota mucha (transl. The Golden Fly).

She wrote more than fifty novels. Most frequently, the protagonist is a woman called Joanna that inherits many characteristics from Chmielewska herself. She also often wrote about Joanna's friends like Alicja (We Are All Suspects, All in Red), co-workers (We Are All Suspects, Wild Protein) or family (The Forefathers' Wells, Bad Luck).

In 2004, she was awarded the Officer's Cross of the Order of Polonia Restituta.

She died on 7 October 2013 and was buried at the Powązki Cemetery in Warsaw.

== Books ==
As of September 2008, there are no published English language translations of Chmielewska's work, and so the exact translation of the Polish titles into English can vary from source to source.

=== Crime fiction ===
- 1964 Klin (The Wedge) (In-context translation of the idiom: Hair of the dog)
  - adapted into the feature film Lekarstwo na miłość (1966), directed by Jan Batory, starring Andrzej Łapicki and Kalina Jędrusik
- 1966 Wszyscy jesteśmy podejrzani (We Are All Suspects)
- 1969 Krokodyl z Kraju Karoliny (The Crocodile from Caroline's Country)
- 1972 Całe zdanie nieboszczyka (Dead Man's Tale)
  - adapted into the Russian television series Что сказал покойник (Chto skazal pokojnik, 2000)
- 1973 Lesio
- 1974 Wszystko czerwone (All in Red)
  - adapted into the Russian television series Пан или пропал (Pan ili propal, 1998)
- 1975 Romans wszechczasów (The Romance of the Century)
- 1976 Boczne Drogi (Country Roads)
- 1977 Upiorny legat (A Ghastly Legacy)
  - adapted into the feature film Skradziona kolekcja (1979), directed by Jan Batory
- 1979 Studnie przodków (The Forefathers' Wells)
- 1983 Duch (Ghost)
- 1990 Szajka bez końca (The Endless Gang)
- 1990 Ślepe szczęście (Blind Fortune)
- 1990 Dzikie białko (Wild Protein)
- 1992 Wyścigi (The Horse Racing)
- 1993 Tajemnica (The Secret)
- 1993 Drugi wątek (Second Thread)
- 1993 Florencja, córka Diabła (Florence, Devil's daughter)
- 1993 Zbieg okoliczności (Coincidence)
- 1994 Jeden kierunek ruchu (One-Way Traffic)
- 1994 Pafnucy
- 1995 Lądowanie w Garwolinie (Landing in Garwolin)
- 1996 Duża polka (The Big Polka)
- 1996 Dwie głowy i jedna noga (Two heads and one leg)
- 1996 Wielki diament (The Diamond Story)
- 1996 Jak wytrzymać z mężczyzną (How to Cope with a Man)
- 1996 Jak wytrzymać ze współczesną kobietą (How to Cope with a Modern Woman)
- 1997 Krowa niebiańska (Holy Cow)
- 1997 Hazard (Risk)
- 1998 Harpie (Harpies)
- 1998 Złota mucha (The Golden Fly)
- 1999 Depozyt (The Deposit)
- 1999 Najstarsza prawnuczka (The Oldest Great Granddaughter)
- 2000 Przeklęta bariera (The Accursed Barrier)
- 2000 Książka poniekąd kucharska (A Sort of Cookery Book)
- 2001 Trudny trup (The Difficult Corpse)
- 2001 Jak wytrzymać ze sobą nawzajem (How to Cope with Each Other)
- 2002 (Nie)boszczyk mąż (The (In)animate Husband)
- 2002 Pech (Bad Luck)
- 2003 Babski motyw (Women's theme)
- 2003 Bułgarski bloczek
- 2004 Kocie worki (A Pig in a Poke)
- 2005 Mnie zabić (To Kill Myself)
- 2005 Zapalniczka (The Zipper)
- 2006 Krętka blada (Pale Spirochete)
- 2007 Rzeź bezkręgowców (Slaughter of Invertebrates)

=== Children's and young adult fiction ===
- 1974 Zwyczajne życie (An Ordinary Life)
- 1976 Większy kawałek świata (Bigger part of the World)
- 1979 Nawiedzony dom (Haunted House)
- 1981 Wielkie zasługi (Great merit)
- 1988 Skarby (Treasures)
- 1991 2/3 sukcesu (2/3 of Success)
- 1992 Ślepe szczęście (Blind Luck)
- 1993 Wszelki wypadek (Every Case)
- 1994 Pafnucy (Pafnucy)
- 2003 Las Pafnucego (Pafnucy's Forest)

=== Non-fiction ===
- 1994 Jeden kierunek ruchu (One-Way Traffic)
- 1994 Autobiografia (Autobiography)
- 1996 Jak wytrzymać z mężczyzną (How to Cope with a Man)
- 1996 Jak wytrzymać ze współczesną kobietą (How to Cope with a Modern Woman)
- 1997 Hazard (Risk)
- 2000 Książka poniekąd kucharska (A Sort of Cookery Book)
- 2001 Jak wytrzymać ze sobą nawzajem (How to Cope with Each Other)
- 2005 Przeciwko babom! (Against Hags!)
- 2006 Autobiografia, tom 6 — Stare próchno (Autobiography - Old Rotten)
- 2007 Traktat o odchudzaniu (The Treaty on Weight Loss)
- 2008 Autobiografia, tom 7 — Okropności (Autobiography - Horrors)

== See also ==
- List of Polish writers
- Polish literature
- Marek Krajewski
- Remigiusz Mróz
