= Matylda Damięcka =

Polish actress (born 1985)

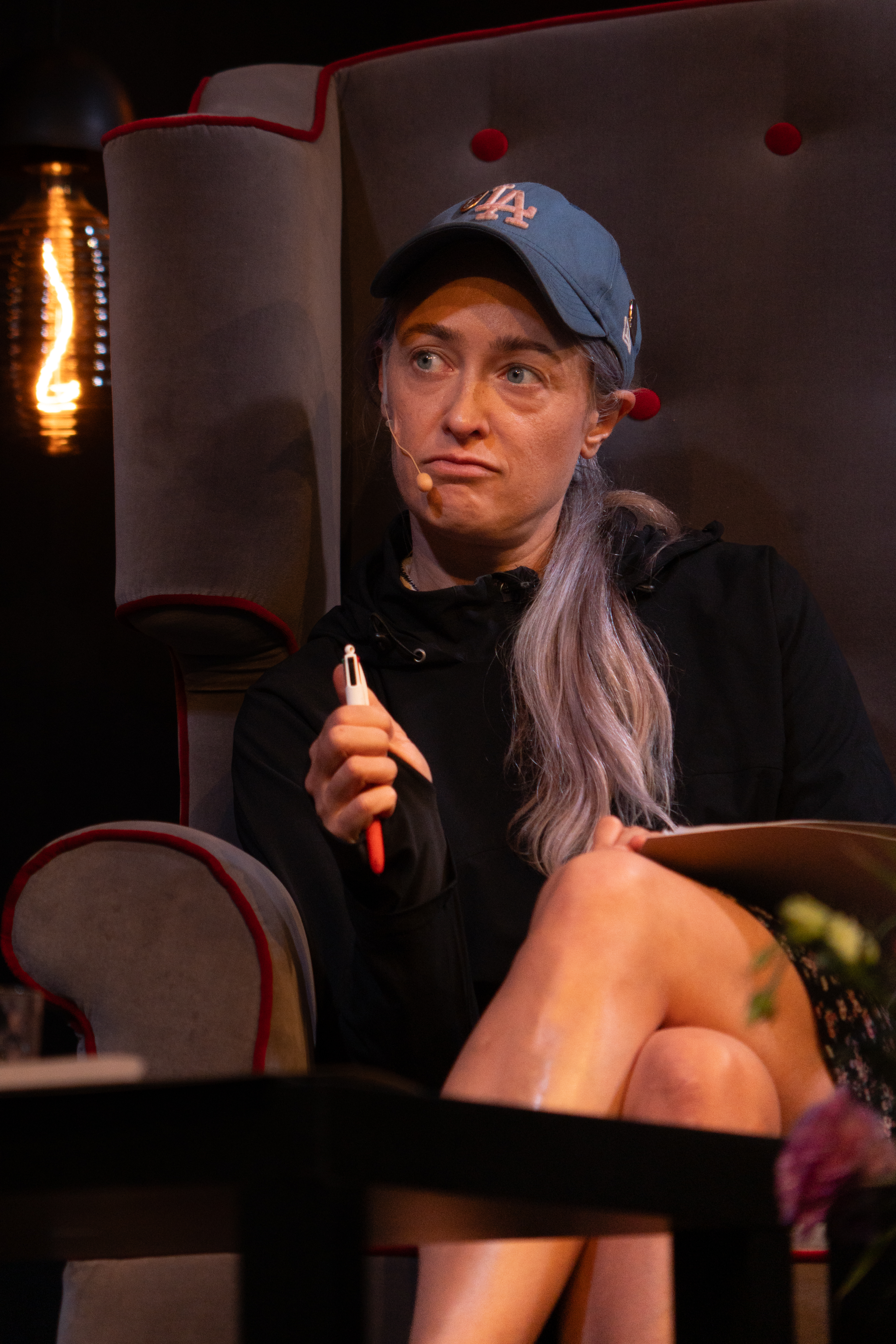
- Damięcka in 2024
- Born: Warsaw, Poland
- Occupation: Actress
- Years active: 2001–present

Matylda Damięcka (born 10 June 1985) is a Polish actress who works primarily in television.

== Family ==
Damięcka comes from an acting family. Her grandparents were Dobiesław Damięcki and Irena Górska-Damięcka, and her parents are Maciej Damięcki and Joanna Damięcki. She is the sister of Mateusz Damięcki, the niece of Damian Damięcki, and cousin of Grzegorz Damięcki.

== Selected filmography ==
List of television appearances, with year, title, and role shown
Year	Title	Role	Notes
2002–11	Na dobre i na złe	Aska Duda / Dominika Grudzinska	12 episodes
2003	Na Wspólnej	Karolina Brzozowska	155 episodes
2003	Zaginiona	Matylda Rogulska	4 episodes
2008	Tylko miłość	prostitute Jola	3 episodes
2008	Czas honoru	Wisia	7 episodes
2017	Wataha	Boczarska	3 episodes
2017–18	Drunk History: Pol litra historii	Dobrawa / Kalina Jedrusik	5 episodes
