= Reduta (shopping centre) =

Shopping centre in Warsaw, Poland

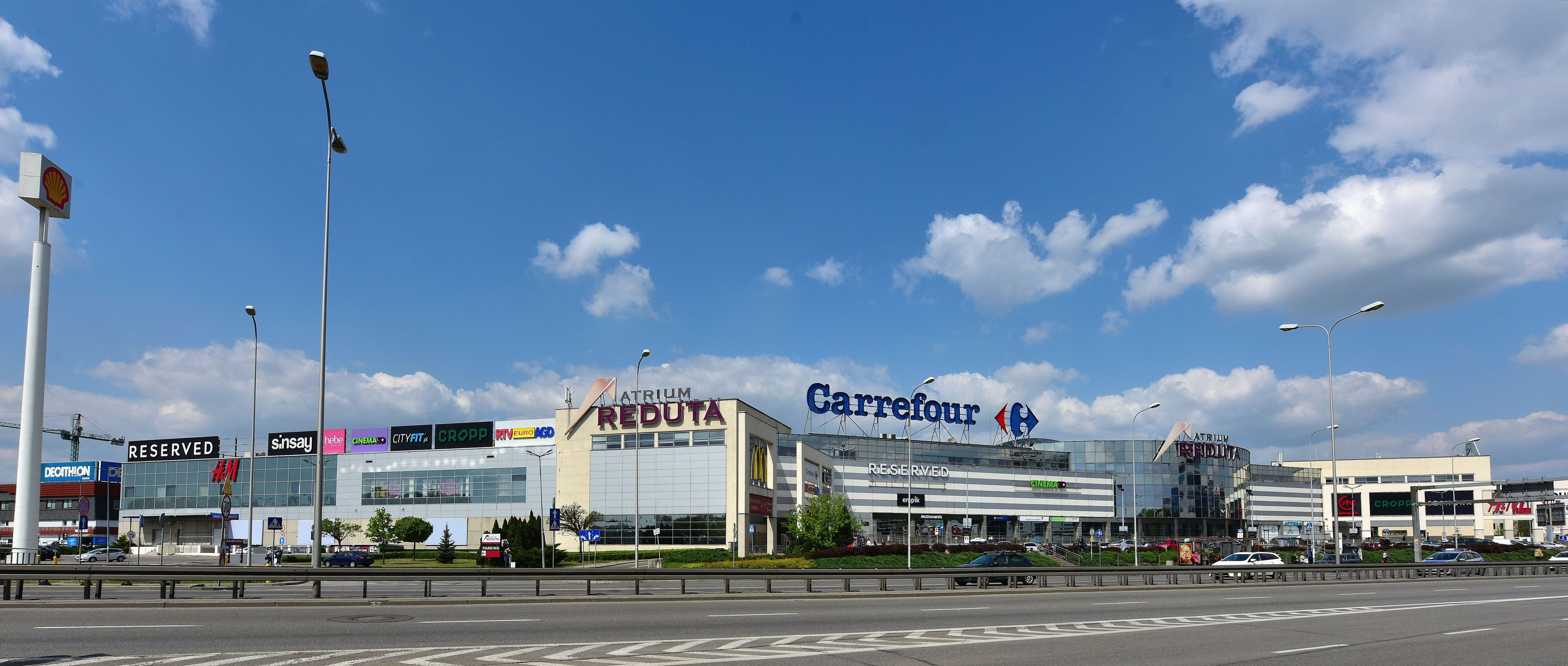
- Atrium Reduta in 2019.
- Interactive map of the Reduta area

General information
- Type: Shopping centre
- Location: Ochota, Warsaw, Poland, 148 Jerusalem Avenue
- Coordinates: 52°12′49.06″N 20°57′03.96″E
- Completed: 1999
- Owner: Atrium European Real Estate Limited

Technical details
- Floor count: 2
- Floor area: 40,500 m²

Website
- atrium-reduta.pl

Reduta (Polish: [rɛˈdu.ta]), formerly known as Atrium Reduta, is a shopping centre in Warsaw, Poland, located at 148 Jerusalem Avenue within the district of Ochota. It was opened in 1999.

== History ==
The shopping centre was opened in June 1999, under the name Reduta. It was later known as Atrium Reduta until 2023. Upon opening, it had an area of 105,000 m^{2}, and a year later, was expanded with another 11,000 m^{2}. In 2018, it was expanded with a health club and cinema, with an area of 4,000 m^{2}.

== Characteristics ==
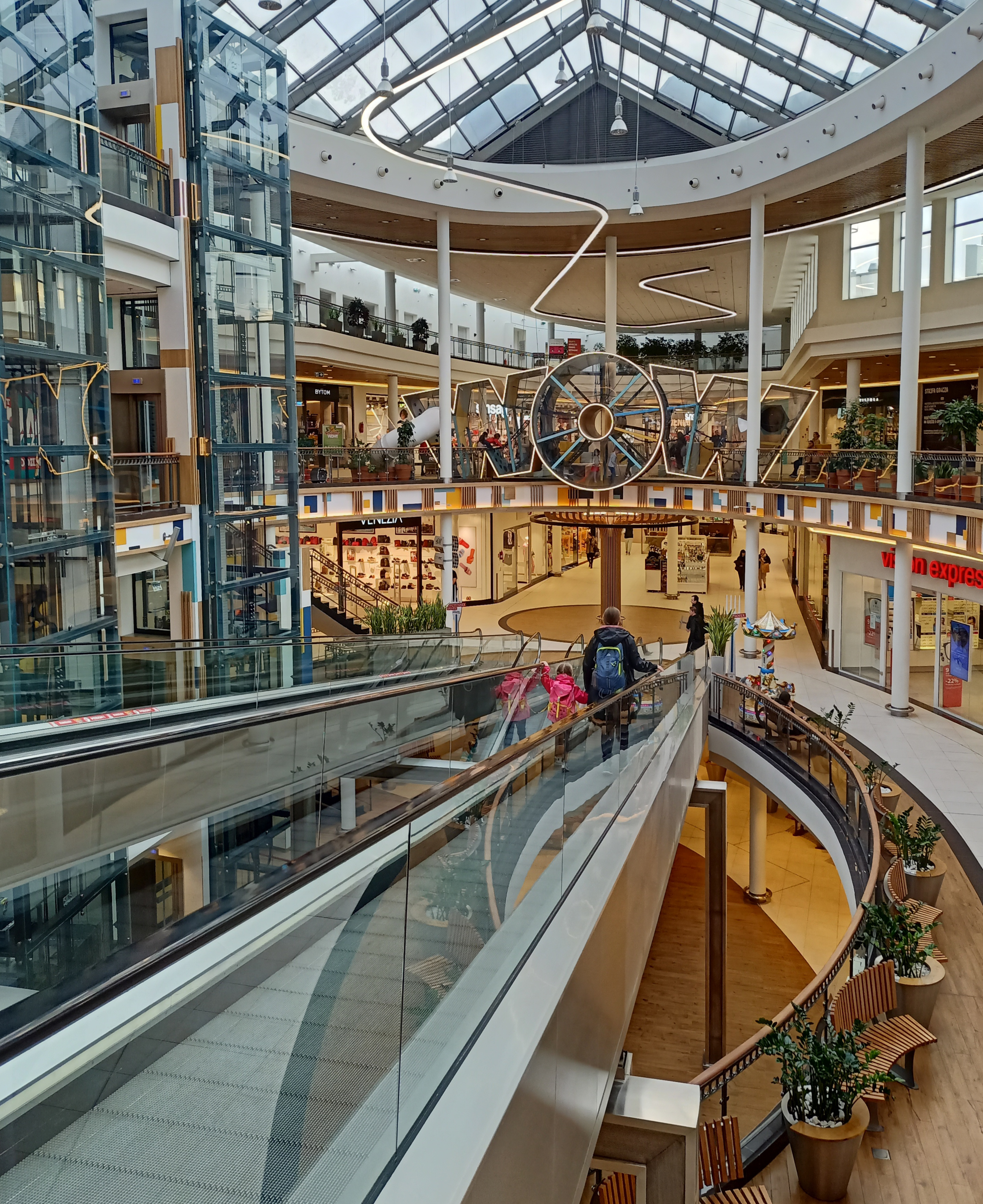
The inside of Reduta in 2022.

Reduta shopping centre is located at 148 Jerusalem Avenue. It is 2-storeys-tall. The building has the total floor area od 40,500 m^{2}, and has 130 stores.

On the opposite side of the street, at 179 Jerusalem Avenue, is located the Blue City shopping centre.
