= Szymon Bobrowski =

Polish actor (born 1972)

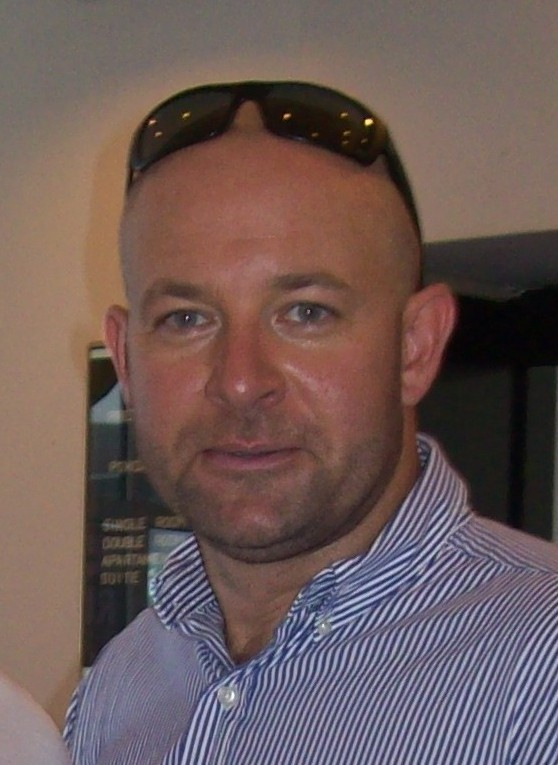
- Bobrowski in 2012
- Born: 16 May 1972 (age 53); Konin, Poland
- Occupation: Actor

Szymon Bobrowski (born 16 May 1972) is a Polish actor.

Acted in tens of cinema and TV films, as well as theatre plays.

== Filmography ==
- Magda M.
- Hania
- S@motność w sieci
- Na dobre i na złe
- Operacja "Koza"
- Serce na dłoni
- Złoty środek
- Twarzą w twarz
- Klub szalonych dziewic
- Świadek koronny
- The Supplement
- The Defence
- Furioza
- Bartkowiak (Film)
