= O psie, który jeździł koleją =

Polish children book by Roman Pisarski

- Author: Roman Pisarski
- Language: Polish
- Genre: Children's literature
- Publisher: Biuro Wydawnicze Ruch
- Publication date: 1967
- Publication place: Poland

O psie, który jeździł koleją (Polish: [ˈɔ ˈpɕɛ ˈktu.rɘ̟ ˈjɛʑ.d͡ʑiw kɔˈlɛ.jɔw̃]; lit. 'About the Dog, Which Traveled by Train') is 1967 Polish-language children's book by Roman Pisarski. The book was based on the life of Lampo, a dog that became famous for his rail journeys across Italy in the 1950s and 1960s. It is a school reading in the third-grade classes of primary schools in Poland. It was published in 1967 in Warsaw, Poland by Biuro Wydawnicze Ruch.

In 2023, it was adapted into a movie of the same title, directed by Magdalena Nieć.
