= Irena Górska-Damięcka =

Polish actress and director (1910–2008)

- Irena Górska-Damięcka
- Born: 20 October 1910; Ashmyany, Russian Empire
- Died: 1 January 2008 (aged 97); Skolimów, Poland
- Occupation: Actress

Irena Górska-Damięcka (20 October 1910 – 1 January 2008) was a Polish actress, mise-en-scène designer, and theater director.

== Biography ==
Born in Ashmyany in the Russian Empire (now Belarus), her mother Alina Górska was forbidden to act after marrying, but used the money from her dowry to build a home with a cinema inside. After graduating from high school, Górska went to theatre school in Vilnius. She made her stage debut in 1936, aged 26, in Juliusz Osterwa's experimental group Reduta. She met Czesław Miłosz in a cafe while reciting poetry, and they developed a relationship that lasted for two years; they continued to correspond throughout their lives after separating.

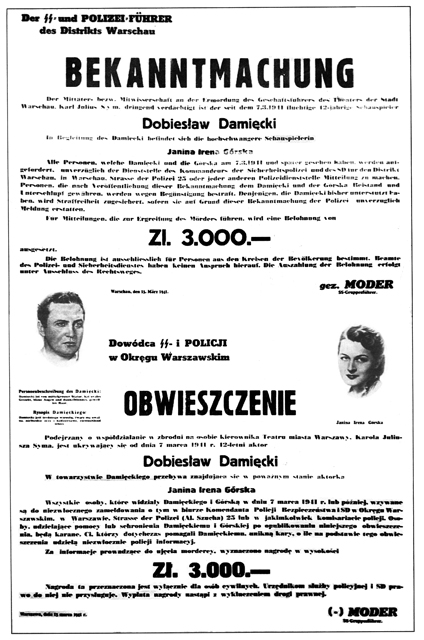
Wanted poster for Irena and Dobieslaw following Igo Sym's assassination

In 1940, Górska married actor Dobieslaw Damięcki, who was married when they met to actress and dancer Jadwiga Hryniewiecka. The following year, the actor and Nazi collaborator Igo Sym was killed by members of the Polish resistance movement after he named Hanka Ordonówna to the Gestapo. Following Sym's assassination, over 100 actors were rounded up by the Gestapo, and the people of Warsaw were given three days to turn over the perpetrators. Górska-Damięcka and her husband, under suspicion though innocent, fled the city two hours before the Nazis searched their home; 21 of those arrested were executed. A bounty of 3,000 Polish złoty had been issued for their arrest. The couple lived through the rest of World War II in Ostrowiec Świętokrzyski, changing hiding places and under false documents, using the name Bojanowski.

In 1953, the People's Council of the Koszalin Voivodeship decided to establish a theater company and tapped Górska-Damięcka as its artistic director. In January 1964, the premiere of Aleksander Fredro's Maiden Vows opened under her direction.

== Personal life ==
Górska's sons Damian Damięcki and Maciej Damięcki, and her grandchildren, Grzegorz Damięcki, Mateusz Damięcki, and Matylda Damięcka, became actors as well.

She died on New Year's Day, 2008, aged 98, in Skolimów, Poland.

== Selected filmography ==
- Serce matki (1938)
- How to Be Loved (1963)

== Bibliography ==
- Irena Górska-Damięcka, Wygrałam życie, 1997 (autobiography) (ISBN 83-7180-778-3).
