= Furioza =

2021 Polish film by Cyprian T. Olencki

- Polish theatrical release poster
- Directed by: Cyprian T. Olencki
- Written by: Tomasz Dembicki; Tomasz Klimala; Cyprian T. Olencki
- Starring: Mateusz Banasiuk; Weronika Książkiewicz; Mateusz Damięcki; Łukasz Simlat; Wojciech Zieliński; Szymon Bobrowski
- Cinematography: Klaudiusz Dwulit
- Music by: Miro Kępiński
- Production company: Hungry Crocodiles
- Distributed by: Kino Świat; Netflix; Tiger House
- Release date: 22 October 2021 (Poland)
- Running time: 139 minutes
- Country: Poland
- Language: Polish

Furioza is a 2021 Polish action crime drama film directed by Cyprian T. Olencki. It was released theatrically in Poland on 22 October 2021 before being released internationally on Netflix in 2022.

== Plot ==
Surgeon Dawid, a former football hooligan, is unexpectedly visited by his ex-girlfiend, now police detective, Dzika. Both used to be members of Furioza, a hooligan firm based in Gdynia, until Dawid "froze" and failed to save Dzika's brother during an agreed upon fist fight with the rival firm, resulting in Dzika's brother's death, another Furioza member, Golden, badly beaten, and Dawid being expelled from the firm by its leader, Dawid's brother Kaszub. Now, years later, Dzika forces Dawid to re-establish himself within Furioza to investigate hooligan firm-connected drug trade - otherwise, the police would arrest Kaszub.

Dawid slowly reconnects with Kaszub and his former firm-mates, with the exception of now hardened and still reserved Golden, gaining their trust after accompanying them to a mass brawl with a rival firm led by Kaszub’s nemesis, Mrówka, and performing emergency surgery on Olo, a senior member who suffers pneumothorax during the brawl. Pressured by Dzika and her supervisor, Bauer, Dawid fails to uncover any ties Furioza may have to a local drug trade - with Kaszub himself threatening to expel any member that gets involved. He also rediscovers his passion for hooliganism and once again becomes an enthusiastic member of the firm - during an away match, he acts as a lookout for an ambush of another rival firm on a train ride, and steals their club flag from a bald, unnamed hooligan who badly beats him in the process. This feat cements his status in Furioza, and gains him respect even from Golden. Dzika also becomes attracted to Dawid again, and they secretly resume their relationship.

In the meantime, murder of a local dealer reveals that it is Mrówka's firm that is involved in the drug trade, supplied by local mob boss, Polanski, but Dzika and Bauer fail to secure enough evidence to arrest Mrówka himself. Golden, who clandestinely tries to enter Furioza into drug trade himself, is working with Mrówka and Polanski to move product. During one haul, he is almost arrested, but manages to evade police when Kaszub, who suspects his involvement, intervenes. Kaszub then threatens Golden with expulsion, and threatens Mrówka not to involve other Furioza members again.

Later, Kaszub is assaulted by unknown attackers, and killed by their masked leader with a pitchfork - a signature weapon of Mrówka. Golden becomes the leader of Furioza and swears revenge, along with Dawid and other senior members. They manage to abduct Polanski, who is murdered by Golden, who then gains control of the Gdynia port and openly enters Furioza into the drug underworld, in spite of Dawid and Olo protesting. Mrówka then contacts Golden and proposes a partnership, which increasingly unhinged and cocaine addicted Golden accepts, declaring it an opportunity to catch Mrówka off-guard while profitting from the trade. Dawid and Olo then attempt to attack Mrówka themselves, but they are instead ambushed by him. Unexpectedly, Mrówka retreats his henchmen, disarms himself, and declares his innocence in Kaszub’s murder - while being mortal rivals, Mrówka respected Kaszub as an old-school, pure and fair-playing hooligan.

Dzika and Bauer, investigating Kaszub’s murder, manage to recover a CCTV footage of the assault, and face of the leader of the attackers - Golden. They arrest Golden and confront him with the footage, but instead of indicting him, Bauer plans to blackmail him into cooperating and becoming an informer. Dzika, disgusted, smuggles the footage to Dawid and senior members of Furioza. They confront Golden at his nightclub, where Dawid fights him one against one, defeats him and attempts to kill him. Olo, in gratitude for saving his life, stops Dawid and forces him and Dzika to leave before he and other members hack Golden to death with machetes and arriving police team arrests anyone present.

Dzika is suspended by Bauer for leaking evidence, and with his revenge completed, Dawid retreats to a fishing shack where he used to spend time with his brother. After docking his boat one day, he is found and stabbed in the stomach by the bald, unnamed hooligan from the train ambush. He sits wounded on the beach and watches the sun set.

== Cast ==
- Mateusz Banasiuk as Dawid
- Weronika Książkiewicz as Ewa "Savage" (Polish: "Dzika") Drzewiecka
- Mateusz Damięcki as Krzysztof "Golden"
- Łukasz Simlat as Jacek Bauer
- Wojciech Zieliński as Mateusz "Kaszub"
- Szymon Bobrowski as Marcin Mrówczyński "Antman" (Polish: "Mrówka")
- Janusz Chabior as Polański
- Sebastian Stankiewicz as "Buła"
- Konrad Eleryk as "Olo"
- Paulina Gałązka as "Mimi"
- Cezary Łukaszewicz as "Krzywy"
- Kacper Sasin as "Messi"
- Krzysztof Wach as "Ronaldo"
- Sylwia Juszczak as Kamila
- Mariusz Drężek as the club president
- Adam Zdrójkowski as a dealer
- Anita Sokołowska as a patron

== Production ==
Filming took place in Gdynia and Gdańsk in 2019.

== Awards and nominations ==
Year	Award	Category	Nominee	Result	Ref.
2024	Polish Film Awards	Best Cinematography	Klaudiusz Dwulit	Nominated	
2024	Polish Film Awards	Best Makeup	Alina Janerka	Nominated	
2024	Polish Film Awards	Best Sound	Jerzy Murawski, Franciszek Kozlowski	Nominated	
