= Detective Forst =

Polish crime drama television series

- Netflix poster
- Polish: Forst
- Genre: Crime drama
- Based on: Forst series by Remigiusz Mróz
- Written by: Agata Malesińska; Jacek Markiewicz; Marcin Cecko
- Directed by: Daniel Jaroszek; Leszek Dawid
- Starring: Borys Szyc; Andrzej Bienias; Zuzanna Saporznikow; Kamilla Baar; Aleksandra Grabowska; Szymon Wróblewski
- Composer: Maciek Dobrowolski
- Country of origin: Poland
- Original language: Polish
- No. of seasons: 1
- No. of episodes: 6

Production
- Producers: Marta Barańska; Borys Szyc; Tomasz Morawski
- Cinematography: Piotr Uznański
- Editors: Krzysztof Komander; Maciej Kozłowski
- Running time: 41–45 minutes
- Production companies: Forst Film; Boma Films; Haka Films

Original release
- Network: Netflix
- Release: 11 January 2024 – present

Detective Forst (Polish: Forst) is a Polish crime drama television series based on the Forst series by Remigiusz Mróz. It was released on Netflix on 11 January 2024.

== Premise ==
After a series of murders strike the resort town of Zakopane at the base of the Tatra Mountains, Detective Wiktor Forst steps in to solve the case with the help of journalist Olga Szrebska.

== Cast ==
- Borys Szyc as Detective Wiktor Forst
- Andrzej Bienias as Inspector Edmund Osica
- Zuzanna Saporznikow as Olga Szrebska
- Kamilla Baar as Dominika Wadryś Hansen
- Aleksandra Grabowska as Agata Osica, Edmund's daughter
- Szymon Wróblewski as Staszek Kowalik
- Maciej Pesta as Gjord Hansen/Iwo Elijah, Dominika's husband and Forst's childhood friend-turned-foe
- Artur Barciś as Jarosław Rozwadowski
- Małgorzata Hajewska-Krzysztofik as Halina Sznajderman
- Piotr Franasowicz as Karol Adamiak
- Magdalena Dębicka as Frantiska
- Mikołaj Kubacki as Piotr Sznajderman
- Krzysztof Łakomik as Jędrzej Lakomik
- Elżbieta Bielska as Nina Pieniak
- Jerzy Rogalski as Leon Lowotarski

== Episodes ==
No.	Title	Duration	Original release date
1	"Episode 1"	45 min	11 January 2024
2	"Episode 2"	41 min	11 January 2024
3	"Episode 3"	41 min	11 January 2024
4	"Episode 4"	41 min	11 January 2024
5	"Episode 5"	43 min	11 January 2024
6	"Episode 6"	44 min	11 January 2024

== Production ==
Filming for the series began in October 2022 in Zakopane, and later moved to Nowy Targ, Warsaw, and Slovakia. Filming was completed by March 2023.

== Release ==
A teaser trailer for the series was released on 29 November 2023. The official trailer was released on 19 December 2023.
