= Blue City (Warsaw) =

Shopping mall in Warsaw, Poland

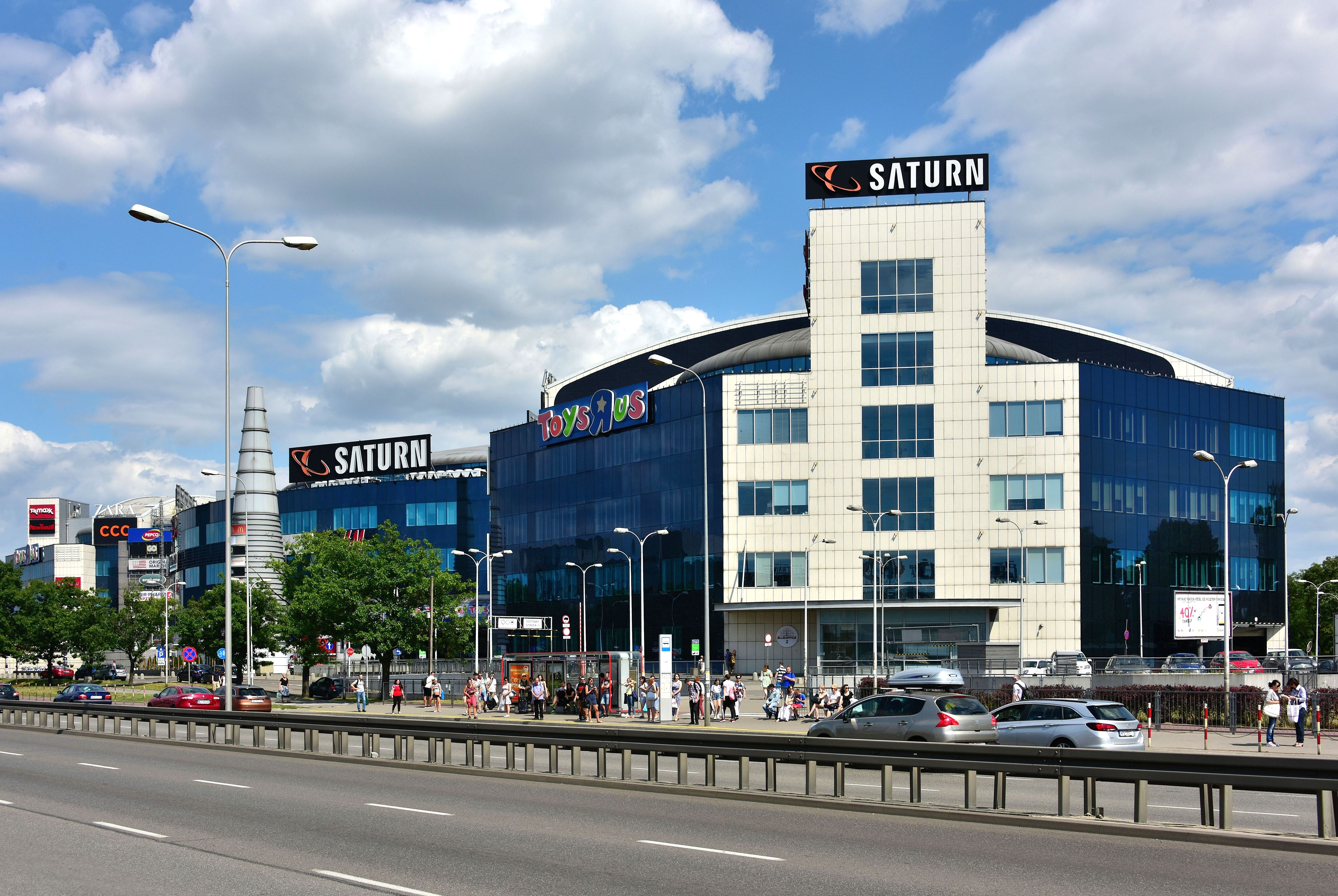
- Blue City in 2018.

General information
- Type: Shopping centre and office complex
- Architectural style: Postmodernist
- Location: Ochota, Warsaw, Poland, 179 Jerusalem Avenue
- Coordinates: 52°12′45.70″N 20°57′21.18″E
- Completed: 31 March 2004
- Owner: Blue City

Height
- Height: 55 m (180.45 ft)

Technical details
- Floor count: 8
- Floor area: 180,000 m^{2} (1,937,503.88 sq ft)

Design and construction
- Architect: Vahap Toy

Website
- bluecity.pl

Blue City is a postmodernist shopping mall in the city of in Warsaw, Poland, located at 179 Jerusalem Avenue within the neighbourhood of Szczęśliwice within the Ochota district. It was designed by Vahap Toy, and opened in 2004. It has 8 storyes, with a height of 55 m (180.45 ft), and a total floor area of 180,000 m^{2} (1,937,503.88 sq ft), of which 60,000 m^{2} (645,834.63 sq ft) is used by stores and services, and 19,000 m^{2} (204,514.3 sq ft) is used as an office space.

== History ==
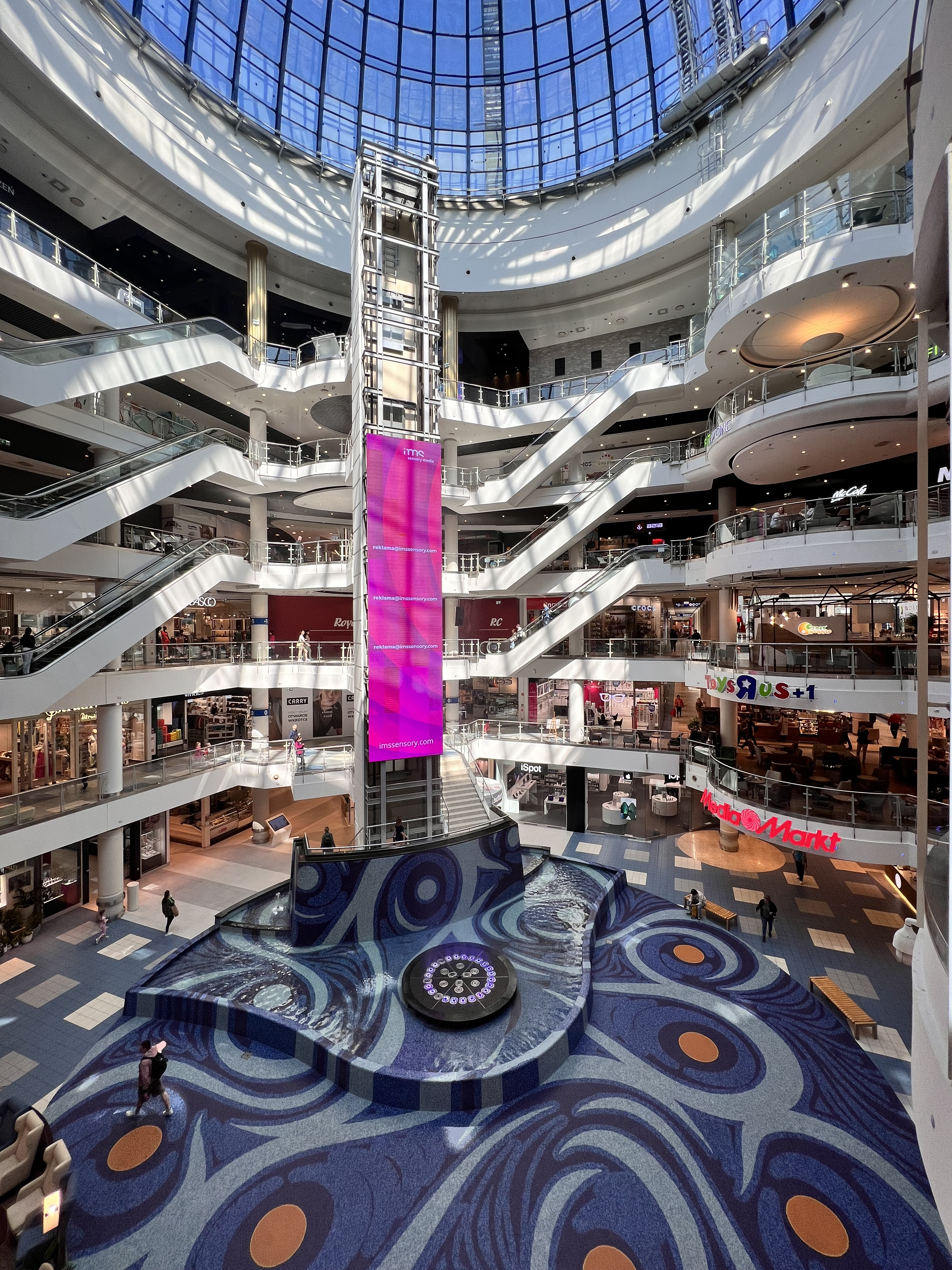
The interior of Blue City.

The project, originally named Reform Center, was first proposed in the late 1990s, by Sabri Bekdaş, the owner of Reform Company based in Warsaw, Poland. It was envisioned as a 9-storey-tall shopping mall. The building was proposed to also include an amusement park themed around musician Michael Jackson. In 1997, Amnon Shiboleth, businessperson and Jackson's lawyer met with the representatives of the company, to discuss the proposition. While the idea of the theme park fell through, Shiboleth himself became interested in the investment opportunity, and bought 51% of the shopping mall ownership from Reform Company. The building was designed by architect Vahap Toy, who previously also designed office skyscraper Atlas Tower for Reform Company. Due to issues between investors, the shopping mall remained unused for several years, and severely deteriorated over that time. Beginning in 2003, it was renovated and remodeled, and was opened on 31 March 2004. With a total floor area of 180,000 m^{2} (1,937,503.88 sq ft) of which 60,000 m^{2} (645,834.63 sq ft) was designated for stores and services, it became the largest shopping mall in Poland at the time.

In 2018, a "miniature" IKEA store was opened in the mall, having an area of 4,800 m^{2} (51,666.77 sq ft), becoming the smallest store opened by the company worldwide, as part of the test of new business strategy, and was closed in 2021. The same year, the Fit/One health club was opened in the mall, becoming the largest health club location in Poland.

== Characteristics ==
Blue City is a shopping mall located at 179 Jerusalem Avenue. It features a postmodernist façade and interior, and has a total floor area of 180,000 m^{2} (1,937,503.88 sq ft), of which 60,000 m^{2} (645,834.63 sq ft) is used by stores and services, while 19,000 m^{2} (204,514.3 sq ft) is used as an office space. It has 8 storeys and a total height of 55 m (180.45 ft). The building includes 220 stores.

The shopping mall Reduta, is also placed on the opposite side of the street, at 148 Jerusalem Avenue.
