= Mateusz Damięcki =

Polish actor (born 1981)

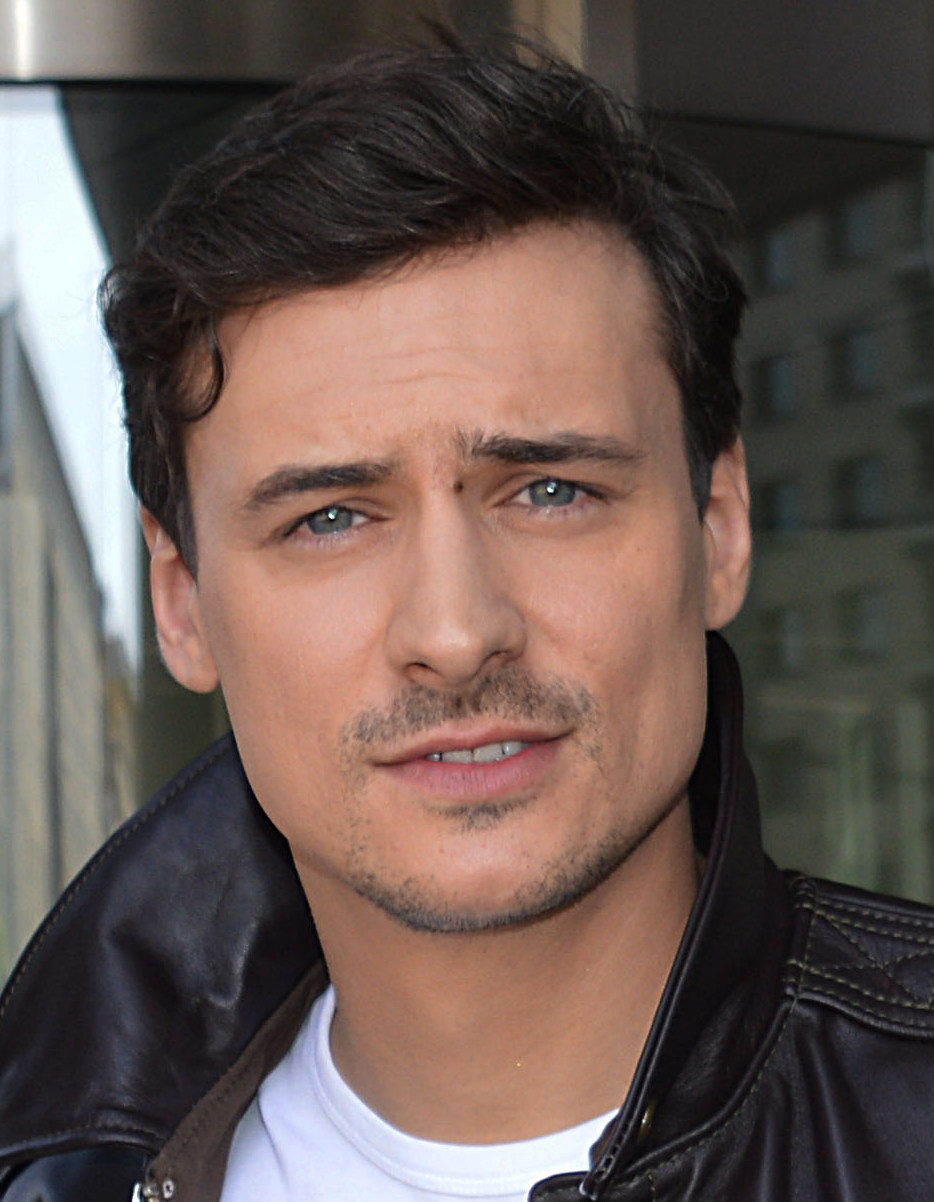
- Born: 19 May 1981 (age 45); Warsaw, Poland
- Education: National Academy of Dramatic Art in Warsaw
- Occupation: Actor
- Years active: 1993-present

Mateusz Damięcki (born 19 May 1981) is a Polish actor.

== Life and career ==
Damięcki was born in Warsaw, Poland in the family of actors Joanna Stankiewicz and Maciej Damięcki. His grandparents were Irena Górska-Damięcka and Dobiesław Damięcki. He is the brother of Matylda Damięcka and the cousin of Grzegorz Damięcki. He made his acting debut at the age of 5 in the stage production by Barbara Fijewska at Congress Hall. In 1993 he starred in the television series Wow playing the leading role and later appeared in a number of television series. In 2000, he starred as Pyotr Grinyov in the Russian drama film, The Captain's Daughter, the adaptation of the historical novel The Captain's Daughter (1836) by Alexander Pushkin. In 2004 he graduated from Aleksander Zelwerowicz National Academy of Dramatic Art in Warsaw.

Damięcki appeared in both film and television. He co-starred in the 2005 internationally-produced miniseries Karol: A Man Who Became Pope and received Independent Film Competition Award from the Gdynia Film Festival for 2009 film, Czarny. In Polish films, he mostly played male leads in the romantic comedy films during the 2000s and the 2010s. In 2021, he starred in the action film, Furioza released by Netflix.

On television, Damięcki was regular cast member on Egzamin z życia (2005-2008), Teraz albo nigdy! (2008-2009), Chichot losu (2011), Na krawędzi (2013-2014), Sama słodycz (2014), Na dobre i na złe (2014-2023), W rytmie serca (2027-2020), Friends (2021-2022), Prosta sprawa (2024)

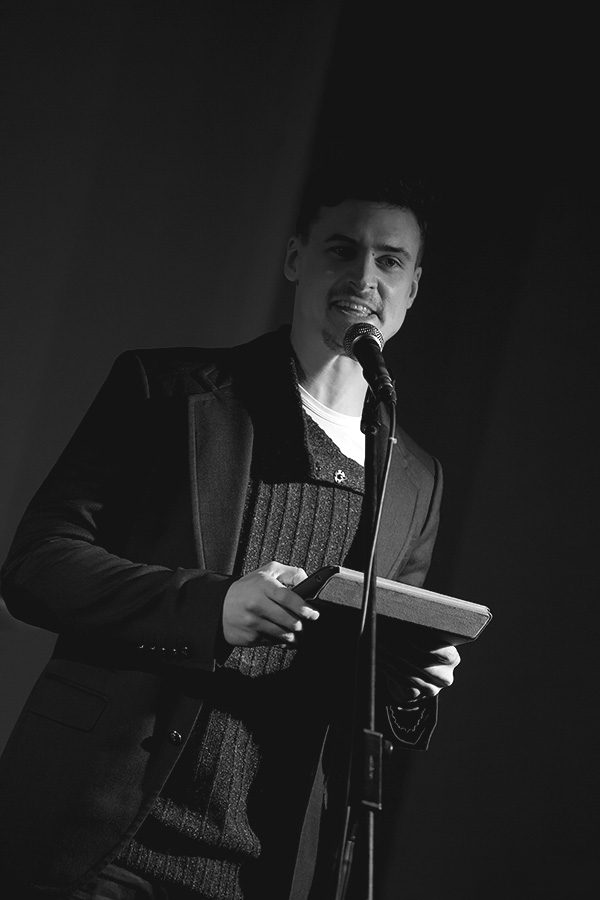
Damięcki in 2014

== Selected filmography ==
- The Captain's Daughter (2000)
- Karol: A Man Who Became Pope (2005)
- Jutro idziemy do kina (2007)
- Remembrance (2011)
- Furioza (2021)
- The Dog Who Travelled by Train (2023)
- The Dog Who Travelled by Train 2 (2025)
- Inside Furioza (2025)
- The Doll (2026)
