= Grzegorz Damięcki =

Polish actor (born 1967)

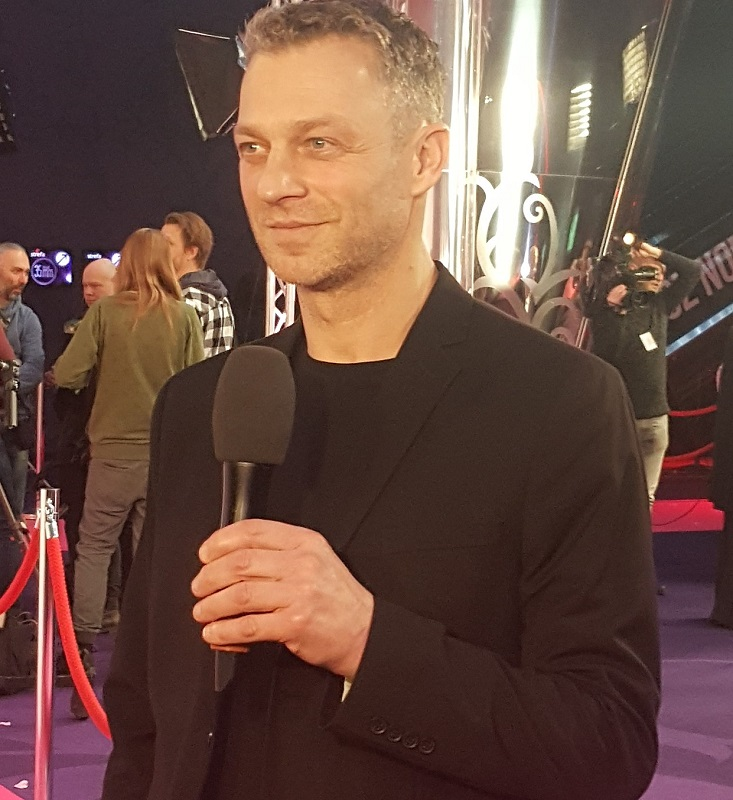
- Damięcki in 2018
- Born: 15 November 1967 (age 57); Warsaw, Poland
- Occupation: Actor
- Years active: 1991–present
- Known for: The Woods
- Spouse: Dominika Laskowska

Grzegorz Damięcki (born 15 November 1967) is a Polish theatre, television, and film actor from Warsaw best known to international audiences for his role in the Netflix series The Woods.

== Biography ==
=== Early life ===
Born in Warsaw, Grzegorz Damięcki comes from a family of actors and filmmakers. He is the son of director Barbara Borys-Damięcka and actor Damian Damięcki, the grandson of actors Irena Górska-Damięcka and Dobiesław Damięcki, nephew of actor Maciej Damięcki, and cousin of actors Matylda Damięcka and Mateusz Damięcki.

He is a graduate of the XXII Secondary School of General Jose Marti in Warsaw and in 1991, received his degree from the Aleksander Zelwerowicz National Academy of Dramatic Art in Warsaw.

=== Career ===
Damięcki made his stage debut in 1991 at the Ateneum Theatre in Warsaw.

In 2020, he was cast in the Netflix series The Woods in the lead role of prosecutor Paweł Kopiński.

== Personal life ==
Damięcki is married to Dominika Laskowska. They have three children together.

== Selected filmography ==
=== Film ===
List of film appearances, with year, title, and role shown
Year	Title	Role	Notes
1993	Szwadron		
1993	Schindler's List	SS Sgt. Kunder	
2000	Keep Away from the Window	Regina's messenger #2	
2002	Chopin: Desire for Love	Lawyer Bourges	
2003	Pornografia	Wacław Paszkowski	

=== Television ===
List of television appearances, with year, title, and role shown
Year	Title	Role	Notes
2012	Czas honoru	Bocian aka major Zwonariew	10 episodes
2012	Ojciec Mateusz	Konrad Jarecki	1 episode
2015	Pakt	Tomasz Nawrot	5 episodes
2016	Belfer	Grzegorz Molenda	10 episodes
2020	The Woods	Paweł Kopiński	6 episodes
2022	Hold Tight	Paweł Kopiński	6 episodes
2023	A Girl and an Astronaut	Wiktor Rosa	2 episodes
