= Roman Pisarski =

Polish writer (1912–1969)

- Born: 23 March 1912; Stanislau, Austria-Hungary (now Ivano-Frankivsk, Ukraine)
- Died: 10 July 1969 (aged 57); Warsaw, Poland
- Education: Jagiellonian University
- Occupations: Novelist, short-story writer, teacher
- Writing career
- Genre: Children's; Young adult
- Notable work: O psie, który jeździł koleją

Roman Pisarski (Polish: [ˈrɔ.man piˈsar.ski]; 23 March 1912 – 10 July 1969) was a writer, children's and young adult literature author, and teacher. He had graduated Polish studies at the Jagiellonian University, Kraków, Poland. He is the best known from his 1967 children's book O psie, który jeździł koleją, that was a fictionalised story based on the life of dog Lampo, who become famous for his rail journeys across Italy. The book had become the mandatory reading in the primary schools in Poland.

== Works ==
=== Novels ===
- Wakacje w zoo

=== Short stories ===
- Sztuczny człowiek
- O psie, który jeździł koleją
- Petros pelikan
- Die Zeitkupplung (published in Die gelbe Lokomotive anthology)

=== Poem stories ===
- Podróże małe i duże
- Opowieść o toruńskim pierniku
- Opowieść o Lajkoniku
- Sklep zegarmistrza
- Gliniane kogutki
- Domy, zamki, pałace
- Jak się mieszka tu i tam
- Wyrwidąb i Waligóra
- W zaczarowanym sklepie
- Szczęśliwy dzień

=== Poems ===
- Rzekła rzepa rzepakowi
- Kolorowa gramatyka
- Śmieszne historie
- Na łące i na płocie
- Na Wroniej ulicy
- Zielone serce
- W lesie
- Patrząc na pawia
- Rozmowa z lalkami
- Prima aprilis
- Weseli astronauci
- Port i morze

=== Theater plays ===
- Piernikarze z Torunia

=== Others ===
- Straż nad Odrą
