= Magdalena Nieć =

Polish actress

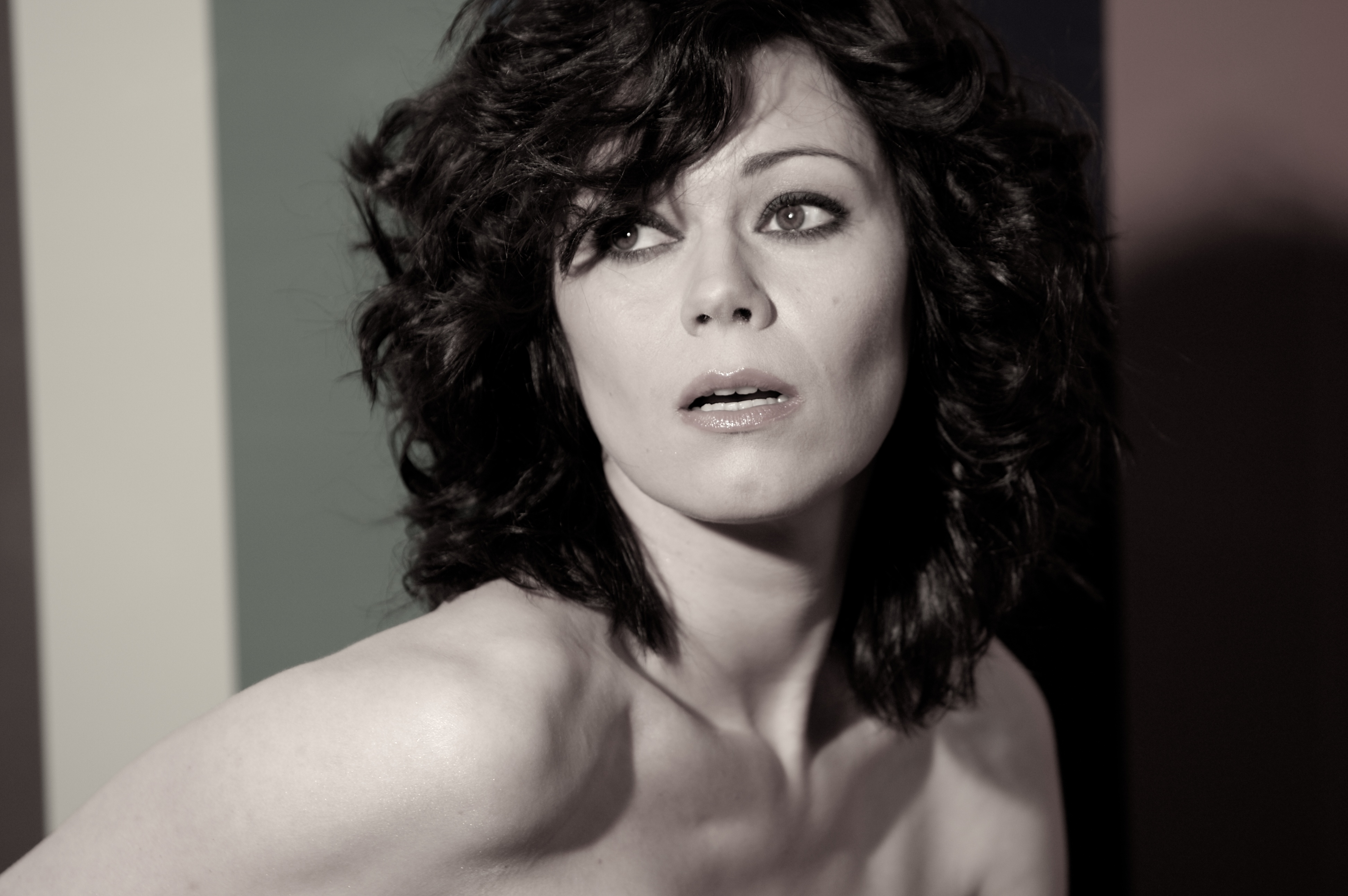
- Magdalena Nieć
- Years active: 1995 - present

Magdalena Nieć is a Polish actress and director.

== TV and film ==
- 1998: Sabina
- 2005: Szanse finanse
- 2005: Wielkie ucieczki
- 2006: Bezmiar sprawiedliwości
- 2007: Pogoda na piątek
- 2008: Jak żyć
- 2008: Na dobre i na złe
- 2009-2010: Na Wspólnej – Oksana Krajewska
- 2008: Gra o Nobla – Danuta Wałęsa
- 2008-2009: Przeznaczenie – komisarz Anna
- 2010: Ojciec Mateusz – żona Adama Gorczycy
- 2010: Majka – Danuta
- 2011: Unia Serc – Anna
- 2012: Prawo Agaty – Beata Kowerska, ciotka Julii (odc. 26)
- 2013: 2XL – Wanda Madejska (odc. 6)
- 2014: Za niebieskimi drzwiami (film fabularny) – Magdalena Borska, mama Łukasza / głównego bohatera
- 2023: The Dog Who Traveled by Train (O psie, który jeździł koleją) – Director

== Theatre ==
Ludowy Theatre in Cracow, Poland

- 2014: Między płotem a kowadłem

Kamienica Theatre in Warsaw, Poland

- 2013: Dzieci z Dworca zoo

Capitol Theatre in Warsaw

- 2010: Wszystko o kobietach

Współczesny Theatre in Warsaw

- 2011: "Gran operita"
- 2008: Proces – jako żona woźnego
- 2008: To idzie młodość – Marika

Ludowy Theatre in Cracow

- 1999: Symfoniczna wazelina 1917 – jako Anna Blume
- 2000: Opowieści jedenastu katów – jako Madame Lulu
- 2000: Wesele – jako Zosia
- 2001: Kafka – jako Felice
- 2002: Prywatna klinika – jako Anna
- 2002: Księżniczka Turandot – jako Turandot
- 2003: Betlejem-misterium na Boże... – jako Matka
- 2003: Przygody Sindbada Żeglarza – jako Królewna
- 2004: Królowa Śniegu – jako Wróżka
- 2004: Biznes – jako Hilda Bigley
- 2005: Proces – jako Leni
- 2006: Stara kobieta wysiaduje – jako Lachezis
- 2006: Paw królowej – jako Anna Przesik
- 2006: Wszystko o kobietach – jako Aktorka I: Magda, Nina, Krysia, Mimi, Rozalia
- 2007: Niezwykły dom Pana A., czyli.. – jako Mama

Współczesny Theatre in Wrocław im. Wiercińskiego

- 1996: Komedia sytuacyjna – jako Doris Summerskill

'Polski Theatre in Bielsko-Biała, Poland:

- 1994: Śluby panieńskie – jako Klara
- 1995: Balladyna – jako Balladyna
- 1995: Kubuś i jego pan – jako Agata
- 1995: Poskromienie złośnicy – jako Katarzyna
- 1996: Okno na parlament – jako Jane Worthington
- 1997: Zemsta – jako Podstolina
- 1998: Moralność pani Dulskiej – jako Mela
- 1998: Mały Książę – jako Róża; Żmija; Lis
- 1998: Słupnik – jako Maja
- 1998: Mistrz i Małgorzata – jako Asystentka, Natasza, Nisa
- 1999: Anhelli – jako Anioł II; Wygnaniec
- 1999: Toast na cześć kobiet – jako Helena Iwanowna Popowa

== Dubbing ==
- 1995-1996: Karypel kontra groszki – głosy postaci animowanych
- 1998-2003: Storks' Tales – character voice actor of the animated series
