= Monika Pikuła =

Polish actress

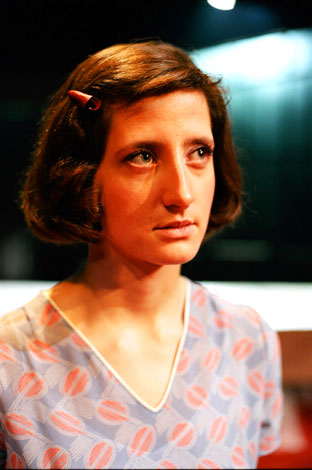
Monika Pikuła in Waszej Ekscelencji.

Monika Pikuła is a Polish theater and film actress. Two years after graduating from the Theater Academy in Warsaw. In 2007, she received Wyróżnienie Award for the role of Zosia in the play Wagon of the Współczesny Theater in Warsaw at the 11th National Festival of Comedy TALIA 2007 in Tarnów.

In 2003, she graduated from the Acting Department of the Aleksander Zelwerowicz National Academy of Dramatic Art in Warsaw. Two years later, she received the Tadeusz Łomnicki Award for theatrical achievements. Since 2005, she has been employed in the team of the Współczesny Theater.
