= Łukasz Jaworski =

Film and television director

- Born: 9 April 1981 (age 45)
- Education: Academy of Fine Arts in Warsaw
- Occupations: Television and film director

Łukasz Jaworski (born 9 April 1981) is a film and television director.

== Biography ==
Łukasz Jaworski was born on 9 April 1981. In 2005, he has graduated from the Academy of Fine Arts in Warsaw, Poland.

In 2002, Jaworski wrote and directed feature film Emulsja. He was a director in the television series 39 and a Half (2008–2008), Usta usta (2010–2011, 2021), Warsaw Pact (2011), To nie koniec świata (2013), Skazane (2015), Na noże (2016), Spider's Web (2021), and Klara (2024). Additionally, he directed films Letters to Santa 5 (2022) and Letters to Santa 6 (2024).

== Filmography ==
=== Directing ===
Year	Title	Notes	Ref.
2002	Emulsja	Feature film; also screenwriter	
2008–2009	39 and a Half	TV series; 12 episodes	
2010–2011, 2021	Usta usta	TV series; 17 episodes	
2011	Warsaw Pact	TV series; 7 episodes	
2013	To nie koniec świata	TV series; 17 episodes	
2015	Skazane	TV series; 13 episodes	
2016	Na noże	TV series; 10 episodes	
2021	Spider's Web	TV series; 7 episodes	
2022	Letters to Santa 5	Feature film	
2024	Klara	TV series; 8 episodes	
2024	Letters to Santa 6	Feature film	

=== Acting ===
Year	Title	Role	Notes	Ref.
2009	39 and a Half	Film director	TV series; 2 episodes	
