= Sebastian Fabijański =

Polish actor

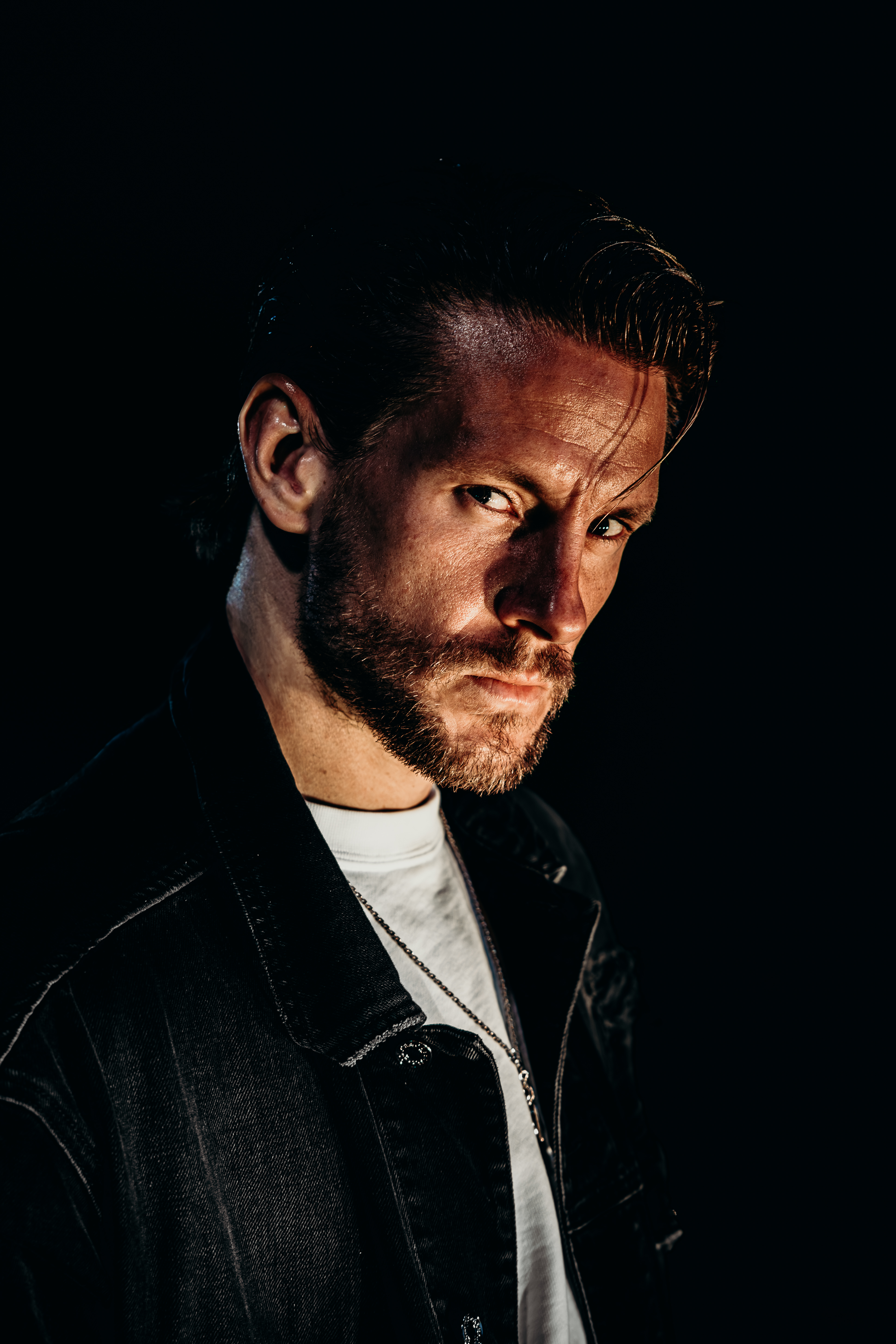
- Sebastian Fabijański in 2024
- Born: 14 June 1987 (age 39); Warsaw, Poland
- Other name: Alterboy
- Occupations: Actor; rapper; singer
- Years active: 2009–present

Sebastian Fabijański (born 14 June 1987) is a Polish actor and rapper.

== Biography ==
Sebastian Fabijański was born 14 June 1987 in Warsaw. He studied acting in Wyższa Szkoła Komunikowania i Mediów Społecznych in Warsaw, then law in the University of Warsaw and again acting in National Academy of Theatre Arts in Kraków and in Aleksander Zelwerowicz National Academy of Dramatic Art in Warsaw. In 2015 Fabijański graduated from Aleksander Zelwerowicz National Academy of Dramatic Art in Warsaw with a MA degree in Acting.

In 2014 he won an award for the Professional Acting Debut at the 39th Polish Film Festival in Gdynia for his roles in films Jeziorak (English title Waterline) and Miasto 44 (English title Warsaw 44).

In 2015 he won an Andrzej Konic Award for Acting Debut at the 29th Tarnów Film Awards for his roles in films 'Waterline (original title Jeziorak) and Warsaw 44 (original title Miasto 44).

== Career ==
Fabijański debuted on a small screen in 2009 in a guest role in a TV series Plebania, followed by a main role in two seasons of TV series Tancerze (English title Dancers). In 2014 he appeared in films Jeziorak and Warsaw 44, for which he received awards for best acting debut at 39th Polish Film Festival in Gdynia and at 29th Tarnów Film Awards.

His breakthrough roles came in 2016 when he starred as Adrian Kuś in a popular TV series Belfer and as Remigiusz Puchalski vel. Sugar in a Patryk Vega directed film Pitbull. Niebezpieczne Kobiety (English title Pitbull. Tough Women).

In 2018 he played main role in a Filip Bajon directed film Kamerdyner, which premiered at 43rd Polish Film Festival in Gdynia.

In 2019 he played lead roles in Birds Talk (Mowa Ptaków), a film adaptation of the last script written by Andrzej Żuławski and film Legions (Legiony), a historical epic drama set during Great War.

In November 2019 he will release his debut hip-hop album titled Synteza.

== Filmography (original titles) ==
=== Film ===
- 2009: Pekin Bielański as Globus
- 2010: Mój Weltschmerz (short) as Michał
- 2013: Strażnicy (short) as Marek
- 2014: Pod Mocnym Aniołem as young „Engineer”
- 2014: Facet (nie)potrzebny od zaraz as a guy screaming into the phone
- 2014: Miasto 44 as „Sagan”
- 2014: Jeziorak as aspirant Wojciech Marzec
- 2015: Panie Dulskie as Zbyszko Dulski
- 2016: #WszystkoGra as Staszek Borucki
- 2016: Nowy świat: Azzam as soldier Artur
- 2016: Pitbull. Niebezpieczne kobiety as Remigiusz Puchalski „Cukier”
- 2017: Gwiazdy as Ginter
- 2017: Botoks as Marek Brzyski
- 2018: Kobiety mafii as Artur Ostrowski „Cieniu”
- 2018: Kamerdyner as Mateusz Kroll
- 2018: Portrecista (short) as Wilhelm Brasse
- 2019: Legiony as Józek „Wieża”
- 2019: Mowa Ptaków as Marian
- 2020: Psy 3 as Damian
- 2021: Inni Ludzie as Jezus
- TBA: Portrecista as Mieczyslaw Morawa

=== TV ===
- 2009: Plebania as Majkel (episodes 1215–1216)
- 2009: Tancerze as Piotr Treblicki (episodes 1–20)
- 2010: 1920. Wojna i miłość as Niewczas (episodes 8–9, 11–12)
- 2011: Linia życia as Kamil Nowik
- 2011: Przepis na życie as nurse Przemek Trok (episodes 16–17)
- 2011: Układ Warszawski as Hubert Cichocki (episode 7)
- 2012: Misja Afganistan as private first class Emil Hołubiczko „Młody”
- 2014: Prawo Agaty as private Grzegorz Faber (episodes 68, 69)
- 2015: Strażacy as Maciek Zajda (episodes 2–10)
- 2015–2016: Pakt as Patryk (episodes 3–4, 6–12)
- 2016: Belfer as Adrian Kuś (episodes 2–9)
- 2017-2019: Ultraviolet as Michał Holender
- 2018: Botoks as Marek Brzyski vel Małgorzata Brzyska
- 2018: Kobiety mafii as Artur Ostrowski „Cieniu”
- 2022: Kamerdyner as Mateusz Kroll
- 2022: The Thaw as Marcin Kosiński

=== Polish dubbing ===
- 2015: Star Wars: The Force Awakens as Finn
- 2016: Lego Gwiezdne wojny: Przebudzenie Mocy (video game) as Finn
- 2017: Star Wars: The Last Jedi as Finn
- 2018: Black Panther as Erik „Killmonger” Stevens
- 2019: The Angry Birds Movie 2 as Chuck

== Theatre ==
- 2014: Ecce Homo as David Hertzfeld - Theatre Collegium Nobilium, Warsaw

== Discography ==
=== Albums ===
- 2020: Primityw

=== Soundtracks ===
- 2016: #WszystkoGra
  - Małe tęsknoty
  - Ale wkoło jest wesoło
  - Bossanowa do poduszki

=== Music Videos ===
- 2016: Ale wkoło jest wesoło by Sebastian Fabijański, Eliza Rycembel, Karolina Czarnecka and Irena Melcer (for film #WszystkoGra)
- 2018: Stare Drzewa by Kortez (for film Kamerdyner)
