= Okorn =

Okorn is a surname. Notable people with the surname include:

- Gašper Okorn (born 1973), Slovene basketball coach
- Mitja Okorn (born 1981), Slovene film director
