= Bołądź =

Bołądź is a Polish surname. Notable people with this surname include:

- Bartłomiej Bołądź (born 1994), Polish volleyball player
- Olga Bołądź (born 1984), Polish actress
