= The Woman That Dreamed About a Man =

2010 film by Per Fly

- Theatrical release poster
- Danish: Kvinden der drømte om en mand
- Directed by: Per Fly
- Written by: Per Fly; Dorthe Warnø Høgh
- Produced by: Ib Tardini
- Starring: Sonja Richter; Marcin Dorociński; Mikael Nyqvist; Alberte Blichfeldt; Tammi Øst; Sara Hjort; Charles Lelaure
- Cinematography: Harald Gunnar Paalgard
- Edited by: Morten Giese; Morten Højbjerg
- Music by: Stefan Nilsson; Kristian Eidnes Andersen
- Production companies: Maipo Film; Memfis Film International; Zentropa International Poland; Film i Väst; Trollhättan Film AB; Fjellape Film AS
- Distributed by: Nordisk Film Distribution (Denmark); Gutek Film (Poland)
- Release dates: 21 January 2010 (Denmark); 28 January 2011 (Norway); 17 June 2011 (Poland)
- Running time: 100 minutes
- Countries: Denmark; Poland; Norway; Sweden
- Language: English
- Budget: 22 million kr. ($4 million)
- Box office: $284,818

The Woman That Dreamed About a Man (Danish: Kvinden der drømte om en mand), also known as The Woman Who Dreamt of a Man, is a 2010 erotic psychological drama film directed by Per Fly and starring Sonja Richter, Marcin Dorociński and Mikael Nyqvist. The film is an international co-production between Denmark, Poland, Norway and Sweden.

== Synopsis ==
Karen, a successful Danish fashion photographer, is working so constantly that she has little time for her husband and daughter. While working in Paris, she spots a handsome man on the street, becoming instantly attracted to him. Maciek is a professor at Warsaw School of Economics visiting from Poland, and she pursues him relentlessly, even going so far as to follow him all the way to Warsaw and ensconcing herself in an apartment right across the street from the apartment where he lives with his wife and family. While Maciek initially encourages the romance, he soon tires of Karen and tries to extricate himself from the relationship.

== Cast ==
- Sonja Richter as Karen
- Marcin Dorociński as Maciek
- Michael Nyqvist as Johan
- Alberte Blichfeldt as Josefine
- Tammi Øst as Marie
- Sara Hjort as receptionist
- Charles Lelaure as Jacques
- Olga Bołądź as Olga
- Rafał Fudalej as Tomek
- Jakub Snochowski as receptionist in Poland
- Michał Chilicki as old man on Hotel Europejski
- Teresa Owczynnikow as old woman in Poland
- Hubert Zawojek as Maciek's son

== Film festivals ==
- 2009 Norwegian International Film Festival (Work in Progress section)
- 2009 Stockholm International Film Festival (Work in Progress section)
- 2010 Leeds International Film Festival (official selection)
- 2010 Lübeck Nordic Film Days
- 2010 Seville European Film Festival (Eurimages section)
- 2010 Taormina Film Fest (Beyond the Mediterranean section)
- 2011 Helsinki International Film Festival (Nordic Exports section)
- 2011 Norwegian International Film Festival (Nordic Focus section)
- 2011 TOFIFEST International Film Festival (Forum 2010/2011 section)
- 2012 Göteborg International Film Festival (Nordic Light section)
