= Marina (Polish singer) =

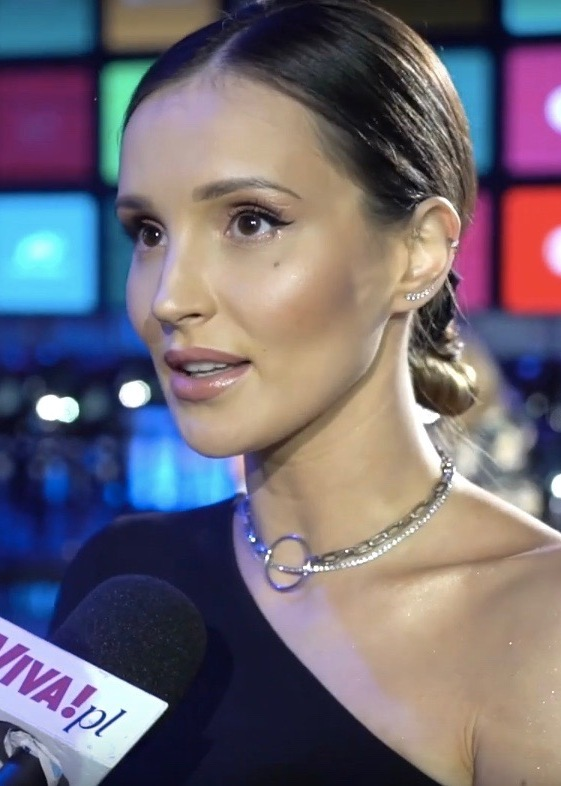
- Marina in 2019
- Born: 3 July 1989 (age 37); Vinnytsia, Ukrainian SSR, USSR
- Other name: Marina Łuczenko-Szczęsna
- Occupation: Singer
- Years active: 1998–present
- Spouse: Wojciech Szczęsny (m. 2016)
- Children: 2
- Musical career
- Genres: Pop; R&B; electro; dubstep; trip hop
- Website: marinaofficial.com

Marina Łuczenko-Szczęsna (née Łuczenko; born 3 July 1989), known mononymously as Marina (stylized as MaRina), is a Polish singer.

== Biography ==
=== 1989–2008: Early life and career beginnings ===
Marina Łuczenko was born in Vinnytsia, Ukraine (then the Ukrainian Soviet Socialist Republic). At age two, she moved with her parents and brother to Poland, where her grandparents were originally from before they moved to Ukraine during the Second World War. The family settled in Stalowa Wola, a city located in southeastern Poland in the Subcarpathian Voivodeship. Her talent for singing was discovered by her father, who was a musician himself. Marina graduated from the first-degree music school where she studied piano, and completed the Agnieszka Osiecka Secondary School in Warsaw.

As a child, she participated in numerous singing contests and television music competitions, winning on many occasions. She began her professional career in 2000, appearing in Waldemar Krzystek's television play Ballada o zabójcach. She competed in Poland's national final for the inaugural Junior Eurovision Song Contest 2003 with the song "Sen". In 2004, she played the lead role of Juliet in Studio Buffo Theatre's adaptation of Romeo and Juliet directed by Janusz Józefowicz. In 2007, she took part in the music competition New Wave, and finished third. She was awarded $20,000, and was offered a record deal with Universal Music Germany, which she rejected as she did not agree with its terms. She also received a special prize of $50,000 from one of the organisers, Alla Pugacheva.

In 2008, she participated in the seventh season of the Polish version of Dancing with the Stars called Taniec z gwiazdami. Together with her dancing partner Michał Uryniuk, they finished tenth.

=== 2009–2012: Breakthrough: 39 i pół, "Glam Pop" and Hardbeat ===
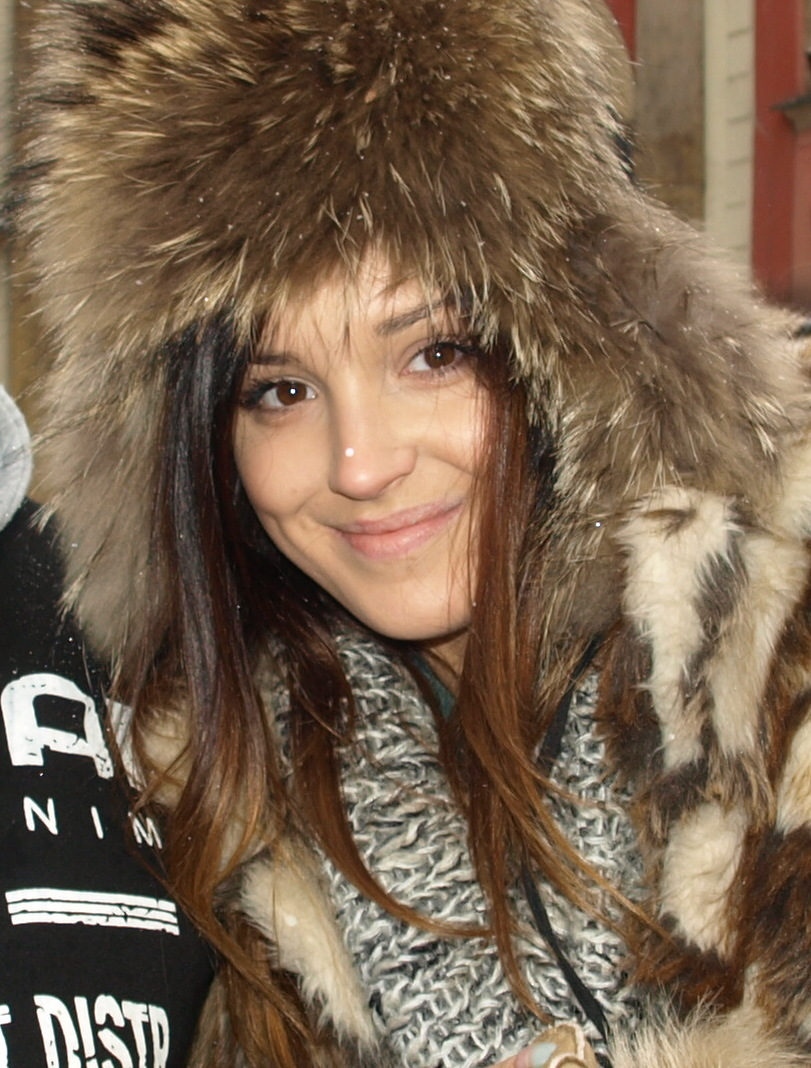
Marina in 2010

In 2009, Marina was cast as Amanda, the daughter of the main character (played by Tomasz Karolak), in the Polish television series 39 i pół. She recorded four songs for its soundtrack 39 i pół Vol. 3.

Her debut single, "Glam Pop", was released in 2010 and became a radio hit in Poland. That year, she received the Eska Music Award for Best Debut. She also released her second single "Pepper Mint" and guest starred in the Polish television series Usta usta.

After parting ways with her manager Maja Sablewska in 2011, she began recording new material for her debut studio album. The album titled Hardbeat, which she released independently in November 2011, received positive reviews from music critics. It was preceded by the single "Electric Bass", released a month earlier. The album's second and final single "Saturday Night" followed in 2012. Marina was nominated for VIVA Comet Awards in 2011 and 2012, receiving a total of six nominations, including Female Artist of the Year and Album of the Year (Hardbeat).

In 2012, she became Levi's autumn-winter 2012/2013 ambassador in Poland.

=== 2013–present: Hiatus, On My Way, 39 i pół tygodnia and Warstwy ===
In October 2013, while working on new music in a recording studio in London, Marina experienced singing difficulties which proved to be caused by a polyp on her left vocal cord. As a result, she was forced to put her career on hold, and in May 2014 underwent laser microsurgery performed by Steven M. Zeitels to remove the polyp.

Marina's comeback single and the lead single from her second studio album, "On My Way", was released in April 2016. The song was co-written by Arrow Benjamin and produced by Pete Boxta. That year, she also featured on James Arthur's song "Let Me Love the Lonely" from his second studio album Back from the Edge (2016). (Note: The duet version of the song was featured only on the Polish edition of Back from the Edge.) Released as a single in Poland, it was certified gold by the Polish Society of the Phonographic Industry (ZPAV).

Marina released her second studio album On My Way on 17 November 2017. The album features ten tracks in English, including a song written by her husband Wojciech Szczęsny ("I Do") and a song co-written with James Arthur ("Lay My Body Down"). "Takin' Ya Rock Out" and "Hiding in the Water" served as the album's second and third singles, respectively. Its fourth and final single, "Complete", was released in August 2018.

Marina reprised her 39 i pół role in the show's revival called 39 i pół tygodnia in September 2019. She released her third studio album, Warstwy, in December 2020. The record debuted and peaked at number 50 in the Polish charts, and was promoted with four singles: "News" with Kabe, "Nigdy więcej" with Young Igi, "Skandal (Odbijam)" with Smolasty and "Nie prowokuj". The first two singles were certified Gold and Platinum by ZPAV, respectively. In 2021, Marina collaborated with Meggie on the single "Lip Gloss". In 2022, she recorded the song "This Is the Moment" in support of Poland at the 2022 FIFA World Cup.

== Personal life ==
In 2013, she started dating footballer Wojciech Szczęsny. They got engaged on 7 July 2015, and married on 21 May 2016. The couple has a son, Liam (born 30 June 2018), and a daughter, Noelia (born 3 July 2024).

In December 2022, Marina revealed she had been diagnosed with an ovarian cancer, which turned out to be benign.

== Discography ==
=== Studio albums ===
Title	Album details	Peak chart positions
Title	Album details	POL
Hardbeat	Released: 5 November 2011; Label: independent release (distributed by Fonografika); Formats: CD, digital download, streaming	—
On My Way	Released: 17 November 2017; Label: independent release (distributed by e-Muzyka); Formats: CD, digital download, streaming	—
Warstwy	Released: 7 December 2020; Label: independent release (distributed by e-Muzyka); Formats: CD, digital download, streaming	50
"—" denotes a recording that did not chart or was not released in that territory.

=== Singles ===
==== As lead artist ====
Title	Year	Peak chart positions	Certifications	Album
Title	Year	POL New	Certifications	Album
"Glam Pop"	2010	—		Non-album singles
"Pepper Mint"	2010	—		Non-album singles
"Electric Bass"	2011	3		Heart Beat
"Saturday Night"	2012	—		Heart Beat
"On My Way"	2016	—		On My Way
"Takin' Ya Rock Out"	2017	—		On My Way
"Hiding in the Water"	2017	—		On My Way
"Complete"	2018	—		On My Way
"News" (featuring Kabe)	2019	—	ZPAV: Gold	Warstwy
"Nigdy więcej" (featuring Young Igi)	2020	—	ZPAV: Platinum	Warstwy
"Skandal (Odbijam)" (featuring Smolasty)	2020	—		Warstwy
"Nie prowokuj"	2021	—		Warstwy
"Lip Gloss" (featuring Meggie)	2021	—		Non-album singles
"This Is the Moment"	2022	—		Non-album singles
"Forever21"	2023	—		Non-album singles
"W blasku" (featuring Sound'n'Grace)	2023	—		Non-album singles
"Baby Mommy"	2024	—		Non-album singles
"To co czuję"	2025	—		Non-album singles
"—" denotes items which failed to chart.

==== As featured artist ====
Title	Year	Certifications	Album
"Let Me Love the Lonely" (James Arthur featuring Marina)	2016	ZPAV: Gold	Back from the Edge (Polish release)

=== Other recorded songs ===
Title	Year	Other performer(s)	Album
"Sen"	2003	None	Non-album song
"Respect"	2009	None	39 i pół Vol. 3
"Hello L.O.V.E. U"	2009	None	39 i pół Vol. 3
"Long Way Apart"	2009	None	39 i pół Vol. 3
"Please Don't Leave Me Here"	2009	None	39 i pół Vol. 3
"Wenus Mars"	2011	Mrozu	Non-album song
"W bezdechu"	2014	None	Muzyka z serca 2015
"Kocham Te Święta"	2014	as part of 21 Allstars	Non-album song
"Większy świat"	2018	None	Smallfoot (Polish release)

== Filmography ==
- 2009: 39 i pół (TV series) as Amanda
- 2009: I pół (TV movie) as Amanda
- 2010: Usta usta (TV series) as Emilia Skowron
- 2019: 39 i pół tygodnia (TV series) as Amanda
