= 39 and Half Weeks =

Polish comedy-drama television series

- Poster
- Genre: Comedy drama
- Written by: Hanna Węsierska; Karolina Szymczyk-Majchrzak; Przemysław Jurek; Bartosz Kozera
- Directed by: Aleksander Pietrzak; Maciej Migas
- Starring: Tomasz Karolak; Daria Widawska; Alan Andersz; Magdalena Lamparska; Monika Krzywkowska; Łukasz Konopka; Sandra Drzymalska; Marina Łuczenko-Szczęsna; Maja Seklecka
- Composer: Łukasz Targosz
- Country of origin: Poland
- Original language: Polish
- No. of series: 1
- No. of episodes: 10

Production
- Producers: Justyna Pawlak, Maciej Wójcik
- Cinematography: Paweł Flis
- Editor: Jarosław Barzan
- Running time: 45 minutes
- Production companies: TVN Group; Watchout Studio

Original release
- Network: TVN
- Release: 8 October – 10 November 2019

Related
- 39 and a Half (2008–2009)

39 and Half Weeks (Polish: 39 i pół tygodnia) is a Polish-language comedy-drama television series, which aired in Poland on TVN from 8 September to 10 November 2019. It was directed by Aleksander Pietrzak and Maciej Migas, written by Hanna Węsierska, and produced by Justyna Pawlak and Maciej Wójcik. It is the continuation of the television series 39 and a Half, aired from 2008 to 2009. The series consists of one season, with ten episodes in total, each with a running time of approximately 45 minutes. It follows Darek Jankowski, a 50-year-old punk rock musician from Warsaw, Poland, who lives a carefree lifestyle, is diagnosed with a disease and informed that he has 39 and a half weeks left to live, and decides to make the most of the time he has left.

== Premise ==
Darek Jankowski, a 50-year-old punk rock musician from Warsaw, Poland, who lives a carefree lifestyle, is diagnosed with a disease and informed that he has 39 and a half weeks left to live. He decides to make the most of the time he has left.

== Cast ==
- Tomasz Karolak as Darek Jankowski, former amateur musician
- Daria Widawska as Anna Jankowska, Darek's ex-wife
- Alan Andersz as Patryk Jankowski, Darek's son
- Magdalena Lamparska as Marta Jankowska, Patryk's wife
- Monika Krzywkowska as dr. Ewa Zarębska
- Łukasz Konopka as Piotr Rozwadowski, Anna's boss and lover
- Sandra Drzymalska as Karola, Ewa's daughter
- Marina Łuczenko-Szczęsna as Chelsea Amanda, Darek's daughter
- Maja Seklecka as Zośka Jankowska, Darek's daughter

== Production ==
39 and Half Weeks is the continuation of the television series 39 and a Half, which was aired from 2008 to 2009, and its sequel 2009 short television film titled I pół. The series was first announced in January 2018 under the title 50 i co?, which roughly translated as "50 and So What?". On 25 June 2019, it was announced that the title was changed to 39 and Half Weeks.

The series was directed by Aleksander Pietrzak and Maciej Migas, written by Hanna Węsierska, and produced by Justyna Pawlak and Maciej Wójcik. Some of the episodes were also written by Karolina Szymczyk-Majchrzak, Przemysław Jurek, and Bartosz Kozera. The cinematography was done by Paweł Flis, the editing by Jarosław Barzan, the music by Łukasz Targosz, the scenography by Agata Stróżyńska, and the costumes by Robert Adamczyk. Main cast included Tomasz Karolak, Daria Widawska, Alan Andersz, Magdalena Lamparska, Monika Krzywkowska, Łukasz Konopka, Sandra Drzymalska, Marina Łuczenko-Szczęsna, and Maja Seklecka. The series was produced by TVN Group and Watchout Studio, and filmed in Warsaw, Poland from 18 February 2019 to 8 June 2019. It aired on television channel TVN from 8 September to 10 November 2019, and has one season of ten episodes. Each episode has a running time of approximately 45 minutes.

== Episodes ==
Series	Episodes	Originally released		
Series	Episodes	First released	Last released	Network
1	10	8 September 2019	10 November 2019	TVN

== Reception ==
A review by Alicja Sterna, published on web portal Onet.pl, described the first episode a promising, combining a reflective story with humor and grotesque elements. She also praised the performances of the lead actors, Tomasz Karolak and Daria Widawska, describing their pairing as successful. The review also argued that the premise retained contemporary relevance because of the protagonist's immaturity as he approaches 50. In an review by Wojciech Krzyżaniak, published on the web portal Wirtualne Media, described the series as entertaining, and Karolak's performance as tolerable and effective despite relying his familiar acting mannerisms. Krzyżaniak critisesed the plot, stating the serries suffered from the excessive desire to demonstrate that it was "cool", and commented that its style seemed to be stuck "ten years earlier", though pointed out it also had its positives. The web portal Spider's Web described the first episode as "promising", and evocative of the positive aspects of 39 and a Half. The series had an average of around 1.26 million viewers per episode.
