= The Girl from the Wardrobe =

- Film poster
- Polish: Dziewczyna z szafy
- Directed by: Bodo Kox
- Starring: Wojciech Mecwaldowski; Piotr Glowacki
- Cinematography: Arkadiusz Tomiak
- Release date: 14 April 2013
- Running time: 90 minutes
- Country: Poland
- Language: Polish

The Girl from the Wardrobe (Polish: Dziewczyna z szafy) is a 2013 Polish drama film directed by Bodo Kox.

== Cast ==
- Wojciech Mecwaldowski – Tomek
- Piotr Głowacki – Jacek
- Magdalena Rózanska – Magda
- Eryk Lubos – Krzysztof
- Teresa Sawicka – Kwiatkowska
- Olga Bołądź – Aga

== Awards and nominations ==
- Polish Academy Award for Discovery of the Year, for directing, Bodo Kox, award
- Zbigniew Cybulski Award for best young Polish actor, Piotr Głowacki, award
- Polish Academy Award for Best Supporting Actor, Eryk Lubos, nomination
- Polish Academy Award for Best Production Design, Andrzej Haliński, nomination
