= Secret Wars (2014 film) =

- Film poster
- Directed by: Patryk Vega
- Starring: Olga Bołądź; Janusz Chabior
- Cinematography: Miroslaw Kuba Brozek
- Release date: 3 October 2014
- Running time: 115 minutes
- Country: Poland
- Language: Polish

Secret Wars (Polish: Służby specjalne) is a 2014 Polish action film directed by Patryk Vega.

== Premise ==
After many controversies Poland's biggest military intelligence and counter-intelligence agency (commonly known as WSI) is liquidated, but its place is immediately taken by a new, secret military organization. Forced to deal with obscure cases, its three members soon begin to doubt both their mission and the people they work for.

== Cast ==
- Olga Bołądź – Aleksandra Lach 'Bialko'
- Janusz Chabior – Marian Bońka
- Wojciech Zieliński – Janusz Cerat
- Wojciech Machnicki – Romuald Światło
- Andrzej Grabowski – prior
- Eryk Lubos – Rafun
