= Joanna Jarmołowicz =

Polish actress (born 1994)

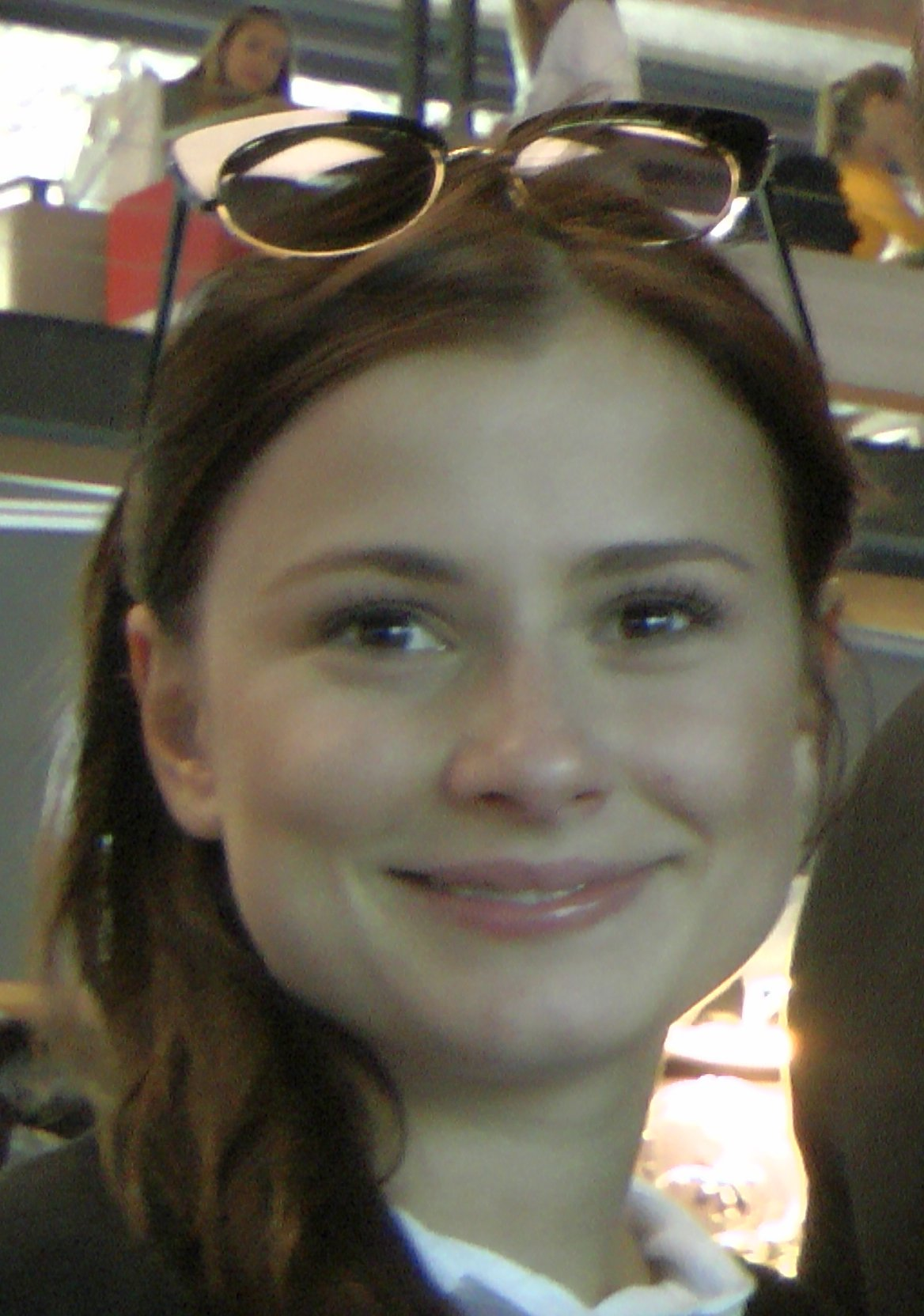
- Born: 19 April 1994 (age 32); Legnica, Poland
- Occupation: actress
- Years active: 2013–present

Joanna Jarmołowicz (born 19 April 1994) is a Polish actress.

== Biography ==
In 2013 Jarmołowicz played a small role in short movie Strażnicy, although her feature film debut was in 2016 in the movie Planet Single.

== Selected filmography ==
- Planet Single 3 (2019) as Zośka
- Planet Single 2 (2018) as Zośka
- Na noże (2016) (2016) as Zuza
- Pierwsza miłość (2016) as Marta
- Planet Single (2016) as Zośka
- Radosław II 2014 as Basia
- Sandland 2014 as Anita
