= Botoks =

2017 Polish thriller film

- Film poster
- Directed by: Patryk Vega
- Written by: Patryk Vega
- Starring: Olga Bołądź; Agnieszka Dygant; Katarzyna Warnke; Marieta Żukowska
- Cinematography: Miroslaw Kuba Brozek; Krzysztof Mieszkowski
- Edited by: Tomasz Widarski
- Production company: Vega Investments
- Distributed by: Kino Świat
- Release date: 29 September 2017
- Running time: 135 minutes
- Country: Poland
- Language: Polish

Botoks is a 2017 Polish thriller film directed by Patryk Vega. It stars Olga Bołądź, Agnieszka Dygant, Katarzyna Warnke and Marieta Żukowska. It was shot in Warsaw, Paris, Copenhagen and Kenya. The title means "botox" in Polish.

== Cast ==
- Olga Bołądź as Daniela
- Agnieszka Dygant as Beata Winkler
- Katarzyna Warnke as Magda
- Marieta Żukowska as Patrycja Banach
- Janusz Chabior as Ordynator oddziału
- Sebastian Fabijański as Marek
- Piotr Stramowski as Michał
- Tomasz Oświeciński as Darek
- Grażyna Szapołowska
- Wojciech Machnicki
- Michał Kula
- Jan Fabiańczyk
- Katarzyna Czapla
- Marek Krupiński
- Krzysztof Gojdź

== Reception ==
=== Box office ===
The film had the second best opening for a Polish film in 30 years (after Vega's previous film Pitbull: Dangerous women), with 711,906 admissions in its opening weekend in Poland. It totaled 2.31 million admissions (with average admission cost at €4.2) in 2017, the second highest of the year in Poland after Letters to Santa 3. In the United Kingdom, it was the third highest-grossing foreign-language film of 2017, as well as the most successful Polish film of all time in the UK, earning £1.06 million at the box office.

Despite its box office success, the film got nine "Snakes" anti-awards, everywhere where it was nominated.

- 2019:Studniówk@
