= Patryk Vega =

Polish film director

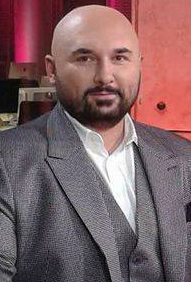
- Vega in 2016
- Born: Patryk Sebastian Krzemieniecki
- Other name: Bezaleel
- Occupation: film director
- Years active: 2005–present

Patryk Sebastian Vega, also known as Bezaleel, is a Polish film director.

== Early life ==
Patryk Vega was born as Patryk Sebastian Krzemieniecki on 2 January 1977 in Warsaw.

Patryk grew up without a father, who left the family when he was a few months old. This absence had a significant impact on his childhood, leading him to take on responsibilities early.

Patryk used to play football during his school days in the midfielder position and was also the captain of his school team.

He studied sociology at the Collegium Civitas.

== Career ==
From 1998 to 1999 he worked as a production assistant at a film studio.

According to a media report, In the 2021, Patryk's three main companies recorded losses totaling PLN 11.3 million. In February 2022, Patryk announced that his last Polish film will be his autobiography and that he would be moving on to shoot English language projects.

== Selected filmography ==
Year	Title	Notes
2005	Pitbull	
2010	Cookie (Ciacho)	
2012	Hans Kloss: More Than Death At Stake (Hans Kloss. Stawka większa niż śmierć)	
2013	Last Minute	
2014	Secret Wars (Służby specjalne)	
2016	Pitbull: New Orders (Pitbull. Nowe porządki)	
2016	Pitbull: Tough Women (Pitbull. Niebezpieczne kobiety)	
2017	Botoks	
2017	Czerwony punkt	Short film
2018	Women of Mafia (Kobiety mafii)	
2018	The Plagues of Breslau (Plagi Breslau)	
2019	Women of Mafia 2 (Kobiety mafii 2)	
2019	Politics (Polityka)	
2020	Bad Boy	
2020	Pętla	
2021	The Eyes of the Devil (Oczy diabła)	
2021	Love, Sex and Pandemic (Miłość, seks & pandemia)	
2021	Exodus (Pitbull)	
2021	Small World	
2022	Invisible War (Niewidzialna wojna)	
2025	Putin	English film
