= Bodo Kox =

Polish actor and film director

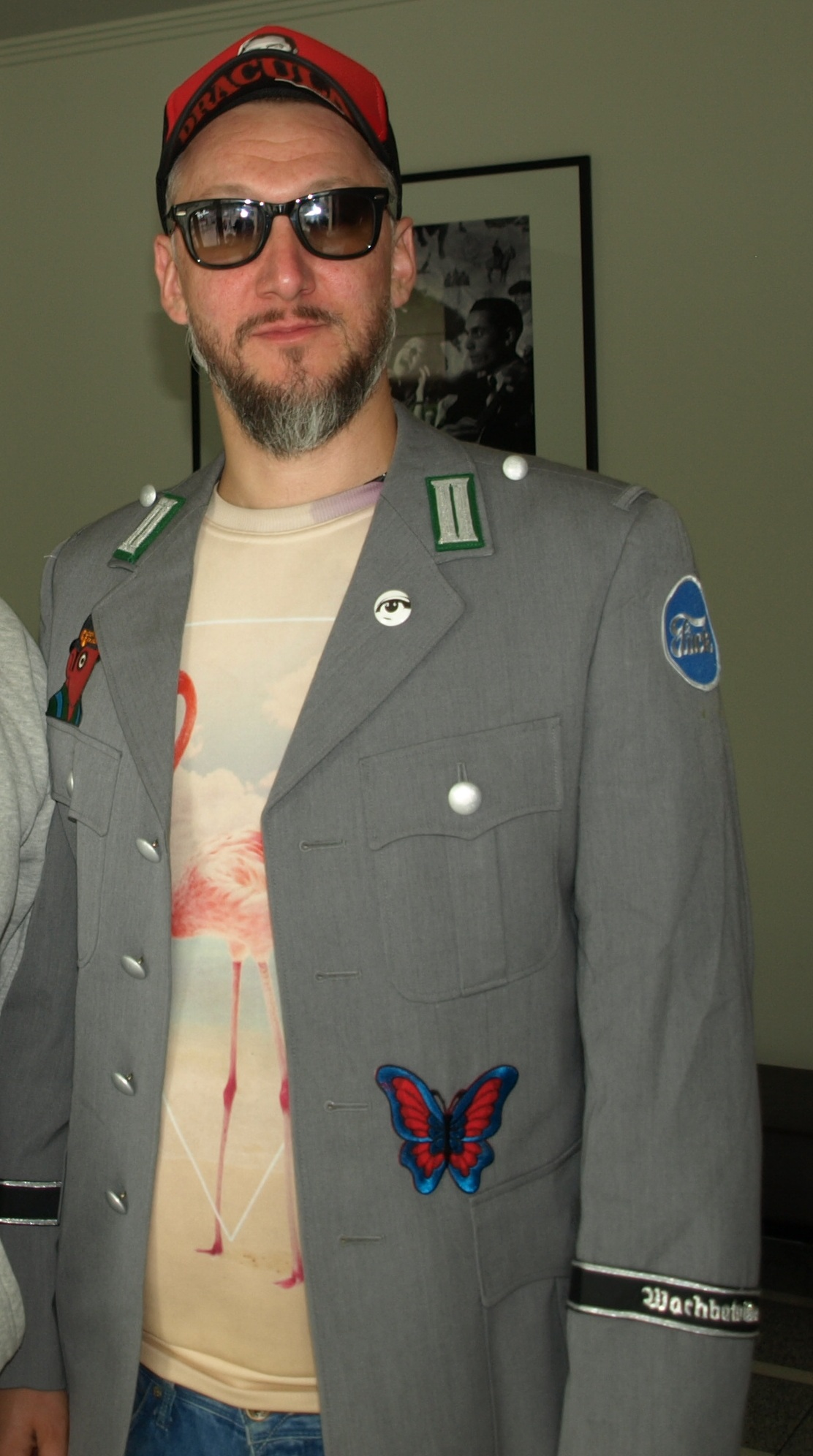
Bodo Kox, 2014

Bodo Kox (born 22 April 1977 in Wrocław, Poland, birth name: Bartosz Koszała), is a Polish film director, actor, and screenwriter, known for award-winning feature films The Girl from the Wardrobe (2013) and The Man with the Magic Box (2017).

He officially changed his name to Bodo Kox in 2006.

== Filmography ==
=== Director, screenwriter ===
- Silverman, 2004, independent, short, comedy
- Marco P. i złodzieje rowerów, 2005, independent, short, comedy
- Sobowtór, 2006, independent, full feature
- Nie panikuj!, 2007, independent, full feature
- The Girl from the Wardrobe, 2013, mainstream, comedy drama
- The Man with the Magic Box, 2017, mainstream, science fiction, dystopian film

== Awards ==
- 2017: Awards for film The Man with the Magic Box
- 2015: Special recognition of the ScripTeast contest for the best screenplay from Central and Eastern Europe at the Cannes Film Festival, for The Man with the Magic Box
- 2013: Awards for film The Girl from the Wardrobe
- A number of independent film awards (2005, 2006) and nominations ("OFFskar" awards, Polish Independent Film Award) as an actor and screenwriter
