= Life in a Year =

2020 film by Mitija Okorn

- Release poster
- Directed by: Mitja Okorn
- Written by: Jeffrey Addiss; Will Matthews
- Produced by: Marc Bienstock; Clarence Hammond; Caleeb Pinkett
- Starring: Jaden Smith; Cara Delevingne; Cuba Gooding Jr.; Nia Long
- Cinematography: Quyen Tran
- Edited by: Matthew Friedman
- Music by: Photek
- Production companies: Columbia Pictures; Overbrook Entertainment
- Distributed by: Sony Pictures Releasing
- Release date: November 27, 2020
- Running time: 106 minutes
- Country: United States
- Language: English
- Budget: $10 million
- Box office: $43,862

Life in a Year is a 2020 American romantic drama film directed by Mitja Okorn from a screenplay by Jeffrey Addiss and Will Matthews. The film stars Jaden Smith, Cara Delevingne, Cuba Gooding Jr., and Nia Long. Will Smith and Jada Pinkett Smith serve as executive producers under their Overbrook Entertainment banner.

The film was released in the United States on November 27, 2020, on Amazon Prime Video by Sony Pictures Releasing.

== Plot ==
Convinced by his father, Xavier, that his only goal in life is to get into Harvard, Daryn meets a girl named Isabelle one night while trying to sneak into a rapper's concert and is instantly drawn to her. He courts and eventually falls in love with her but when Daryn confesses his love, Isabelle reveals that she has cancer and doesn't have much time left.

Daryn makes a plan to live a life in a year. Isabelle recognizes his potential as a rapper and helps him to make his first demo CD. When Daryn takes her to meet his parents, Xavier, disliking Isabelle, uses the moment to fire questions at her. He concludes by saying it is his responsibility to protect his son from distractions, such as girls; especially those like Isabelle. Feeling offended and rejected, Isabelle and her drag queen, parental figure Phil leave and Daryn is left alone and depressed.

A few days later, Daryn is shortlisted at Harvard and he attends his interview with Xavier. When asked what skills and abilities he has, he loses himself to memories of Isabelle. To his father's disappointment, he ends up saying exactly what Isabelle had made him realize that all his accomplishments are in the grand scheme of a life he is living only for his father, and excuses himself. Later at home, Daryn quarrels with Xavier and is almost punched by him but his mother Catherine intervenes and stops the fight. Daryn goes to Isabelle and apologizes, deciding to abandon his family and leave town with Isabelle.

The two spend days together, and one day, Daryn tries to surprise her by driving her to her mother Amanda's house. He convinces Isabelle to talk with her, but when she does, Amanda recognizes her but tells her to leave. Feeling rejected, Isabelle asks Daryn to drive away. While driving, an upset Isabelle starts yelling and shouting at Daryn, distracting him so he crashes into a bush near the beach. When Isabelle gets out, she becomes unconscious. Daryn calls for help, and manages to get Isabelle to the hospital.

A few days after Isabelle is discharged, Amanda comes to visit to apologize and explains to Isabelle why she left. Isabelle thanks Daryn for the opportunity to say goodbye to her mother. Catherine discovers that Daryn is back in town and decides to see him. Isabelle suggests Daryn that he should take a break from taking care of her just for the day, as Catherine is around. Daryn uses the opportunity to record his second song. When Daryn gets back, he finds Catherine panicking and Isabelle on the floor, unconscious and bleeding through her mouth. They get her to the hospital and discover that Isabelle's cancer has spread and her organs are shutting down. The nurse concludes by saying that Isabelle has only a few weeks left.

Soon after Isabelle is discharged, she surprises Daryn with a wedding. They get married and consummate their love. Isabelle passes away a short time later. Daryn reconciles with Xavier and moves to New York City to pursue a career in music after graduating but not before Isabelle posthumously leaves him one more surprise.

== Cast ==
- Jaden Smith as Daryn
- Cara Delevingne as Isabelle
- Nia Long as Catherine, Daryn's mother
- Cuba Gooding Jr. as Xavier, Daryn's father
- RZA as Ron
- Michelle Giroux as Amanda, Isabelle's mother
- Chris D'Elia as Phil
- Stony Blyden as Kiran
- JT Neal as Sammy
- Big Sean as himself
- Pedro Miguel Arce as security guard

== Production ==
=== Casting ===
In March 2017, it was announced Cara Delevingne and Jaden Smith had joined the cast of the film, with Mitja Okorn directing from a screenplay by Jeffrey Addiss and Will Matthews. Will Smith and Jada Pinkett Smith served as executive producers via their Overbrook Entertainment banner. In April 2017, Terrence Howard, Stony Blyden, Nia Long, RZA and JT Neal joined the cast of the film. In May 2017, Chris D'Elia and Cuba Gooding Jr. joined the cast of the film, with Gooding Jr. replacing Howard.

=== Filming ===
Principal photography began in April 2017, in Toronto.

== Release ==
Life in a Year was released in the United States on November 27, 2020, on Amazon Prime Video by Sony Pictures Releasing.
