= Pitbull (film) =

2005 film by Patryk Vega

- Directed by: Patryk Vega
- Starring: Marcin Dorociński; Janusz Gajos
- Cinematography: Miroslaw Kuba Brozek
- Release date: 8 April 2005
- Running time: 1h 37min
- Country: Poland
- Language: Polish
- Box office: $458,874

Pitbull is a 2005 Polish action film directed by Patryk Vega.

== Cast ==
- Marcin Dorociński – Slawomir Desperski "Despero"
- Janusz Gajos – Zbigniew Chyb "Benek"
- Andrzej Grabowski – Jacek Goc "Gebels"
- Rafał Mohr – Krzysztof Magiera "Nielat"
- Krzysztof Stroiński – Metyl
- Michał Kula – Włodzimierz Barszczyk "Barszczu"
- Weronika Rosati – Dżemma
- Ryszard Filipski – Wor
