= The Thaw (Polish TV series) =

Polish crime drama television series

- Polish: Odwilż
- Genre: Crime drama; Mystery
- Created by: Marta Szymanek
- Written by: Marta Szymanek; Piotr Gerard Szymanek
- Directed by: Xawery Żuławski
- Starring: Katarzyna Wajda; Bartłomiej Kotschedoff; Cezary Łukaszewicz; Juliusz Chrząstowski; Sebastian Fabijański; Andrzej Grabowski; Bogusław Linda
- Opening theme: "When the Party's Over" by Billie Eilish
- Composer: Łukasz Targosz
- Country of origin: Poland
- Original language: Polish
- No. of seasons: 3
- No. of episodes: 18

Production
- Executive producers: Andrzej Besztak; Izabela Lopuch; Antony Root; Johnathan Young
- Producer: Bogumił Lipski
- Cinematography: Tomasz Naumiuk, Marian Prokop
- Editors: Piotr Kmiecik; Wojciech Mrówczynski
- Running time: 48–55 minutes
- Production companies: HBO Europe; Magnolia Films

Original release
- Network: HBO Max
- Release: 1 April – 15 April 2022
- Network: Max
- Release: 23 August – 27 September 2024
- Network: HBO Max
- Release: 17 October 2025 – present

The Thaw (Polish: Odwilż) is a Polish crime drama television series created by Marta Szymanek. Set in Szczecin, it tells the story of a detective investigating the murder of a young mother. It began airing on HBO Max on 1 April 2022.

== Premise ==
Widowed detective Katarzyna Zawieja investigates the murder of a young woman and her newborn in Szczecin, while also coming to terms with the death of her own husband.

== Cast ==
=== Main ===
- Katarzyna Wajda as Katarzyna Zawieja
- Bartłomiej Kotschedoff as Krzysztof Trepa
- Cezary Łukaszewicz as Andrzej Radwan
- Juliusz Chrząstowski as Bogdan Pietrzak
- Sebastian Fabijański as Marcin Kosiński
- Andrzej Grabowski as Jan Zawieja
- Bogusław Linda as Michał Strzelecki
- Agnieszka Dygant
- Mirosław Zbrojewicz
- Nikodem Rozbicki
- Aleksander Kaleta
- Eryk Kulm
- Andrzej Konopka
- Tomasz Schuchardt

=== Recurring ===
- Marcelina Stępkowska as Hania Zawieja
- Marcin Zarzeczny as Grzegorz Adamski
- Małgorzata Gorol as Anka Janas
- Monika Krzywkowska as Dorota Czerwińska
- Agnieszka Pilaszewska as Mirosława Janas
- Wojciech Zieliński as Wojciech Zawieja
- Julia Rosnowska as Magda Kosińska
- Jaśmina Polak as Zofia Radwan
- Piotr Żurawski as Konrad Janas
- Ewa Skibińska as Małgorzata Adamczyk
- Michał Czernecki
- Agnieszka Suchora
- Barbara Jonak

== Episodes ==
=== Series overview ===
Series	Episodes	Originally released	
Series	Episodes	First released	Last released
1	6	1 April 2022	15 April 2022
2	6	23 August 2024	27 September 2024
3	6	17 October 2025	21 November 2025

=== Season 1 (2022) ===
No. overall	No. in season	Title	Duration	Original release date
1	1	"Episode 1"	50 min	1 April 2022
2	2	"Episode 2"	46 min	1 April 2022
3	3	"Episode 3"	48 min	8 April 2022
4	4	"Episode 4"	48 min	8 April 2022
5	5	"Episode 5"	55 min	15 April 2022
6	6	"Episode 6"	49 min	15 April 2022

=== Season 2 (2024) ===
No. overall	No. in season	Title	Duration	Original release date
7	1	"Episode One"	TBA	23 August 2024
8	2	"Episode Two"	TBA	30 August 2024
9	3	"Episode Three"	TBA	6 September 2024
10	4	"Episode Four"	TBA	13 September 2024
11	5	"Episode Five"	TBA	20 September 2024
12	6	"Episode Six"	TBA	27 September 2024

=== Season 3 (2025) ===
No. overall	No. in season	Title	Duration	Original release date
13	1	"Episode One"	TBA	17 October 2025
14	2	"Episode Two"	TBA	24 October 2025
15	3	"Episode Three"	TBA	31 October 2025
16	4	"Episode Four"	TBA	7 November 2025
17	5	"Episode Five"	TBA	14 November 2025
18	6	"Episode Six"	TBA	21 November 2025

== Production ==
The series was announced in December 2019. It was shot in Szczecin beginning in January 2020 and was scheduled to last until May of that year, however, filming was delayed due to the COVID-19 pandemic.
