= Planet Single =

2016 Polish film

Planeta Singli
- Directed by: Mitja Okorn
- Written by: Sam Akina Jules Jones
- Produced by: Radek Drabik Michał Chaciński
- Starring: Maciej Stuhr; Agnieszka Więdłocha
- Production company: Gigant Films
- Release date: 5 February 2016
- Running time: 136 minutes
- Country: Poland
- Language: Polish
- Box office: $ 9 252 084

Planet Single (Polish: Planeta singli) is a 2016 Polish comedy film directed by Mitja Okorn.

== Plot ==
=== Ania and Tomek ===
Ania, a single 27-year-old elementary school music teacher, goes on an online date. When her date, "Ant_Man", does not show up, a successful TV-host and puppeteer Tomek notices her. As he is very popular with women, he believes her to be an easy game. He preys on Ania's unsuccessful situation in order to convince her to sleep with him. Ania, however, is not impressed by his brusqueness and tells him she expects knightly behaviour from any suitor.

In the next TV-show episode, Tomek presents a puppet, "Hania", closely resembling Ania and makes fun of "Hania's" character and behavior. Following the strong reactions to the episode, the show is scheduled to air on primetime. This causes the replacement of Marcel, the show's producer and Tomek's long-time friend.

Tomek needs more "Hania's" stories to present, so he finds Ania and strikes a deal with her: she is to go on online dates and provide Tomek with ideas for his show. In exchange, he will buy a new piano for Ania's school. Ania uses a dating app "Planet Single" to find dates and reports back to Tomek. The sketches based on Ania's dates are a success. She is contacted by another user, "Bitter-Sweet", and they have a friendly chat. Ania wants to meet him but "Bitter-Sweet" refuses and says that he only wants to chat for now. Ania's estranged mother dislikes Ania's online dating.

"Ant_Man", whose real name is Antonio, suddenly asks for a second chance. Ania goes on a date with Antonio and likes him. Antonio explains, that he's been a widower for the past few months and that he missed the previous date because of his daughter. Ania tells Tomek about Antonio. Tomek, who has been slowly falling in love with Ania, thinks that Antonio is just manipulating Ania as Antonio's story seems far-fetched.

Tomek manages to find Antonio's wife and together with Marcel they interrupt Hania's second date with Antonio. Tomek calls Antonio a cheater while recording the entire incident on camera. However, it turns out that the woman isn't actually Antonio's wife, but his sister, and that Antonio spoke the truth the entire time. Antonio walks away in disgust. Ania scolds Tomek and refuses to see him ever again. Marcel is upset about the situation as well as Tomek's behavior and resigns from his job.

Some days later, Antonio visits Ania to inform her that he won't date her anymore, because the incident with Tomek made him realize that he still isn't ready for a serious relationship. He and Ania part ways on good terms.

In a final episode of Tomek's show, the recorded incident from Ania's previous date is to be shown, much to Tomek's regret. He seeks out Marcel's help and together they hijack the intended episode program. Instead of the date recording, Tomek presents a video featuring several of "Hania's" past dates. They have all found love because of their failed dates with "Hania". Tomek then gives a speech about "Hania", admiring that she is, unlike him, brave, honest and confident. He doesn't reveal "Hania's" true identity and instead considers "Hania" to be more of an everyday hero. Tomek encourages viewers not to end up alone like he did.

Ania's mother, moved by Tomek's speech, reconnects with Ania. At home, Ania notices that "Bitter-Sweet" has been trying to contact her. She sets up a date with him. It turns out that "Bitter-Sweet" is actually Tomek, who comes to the date dressed in knight armor. He tells Ania he loves her and they kiss.

=== Ola, Bogdan and Zośka ===
Ola, a hairdresser and Ania's friend, is fired from her new job after she deliberately ignores customer's wishes and, considering herself to be an infallible professional, cuts the hair in her own way. Bogdan, the director of Ania's school and Ola's boyfriend, is displeased with Ola's lack of discipline. Zośka, Bogdan's daughter, openly dislikes Ola, claiming that Ola is the reason why Zośka's mother left Bogdan.

Thanks to Ania, Ola discovers that Bogdan has an active profile on "Planet Single" and thinks that Bogdan is cheating on her. She creates her own fake profile and is later contacted by Bogdan and they start chatting. However, unbeknownst to everyone, Bogdan's profile is also a fake set up by Zośka. She wants to pit Ola and Bogdan against each other and make them break up. Real Bogdan discovers that Ola has a profile and, not knowing that it's a fake, thinks that Ola is cheating on him.

Ola pretends to go on a date and Bogdan secretly follows her. They argue loudly in public. Both of them thinking that one has been cheating on the other, and eventually break up. Their argument is recorded by Zośka, who watches them from afar and publishes the recording on internet. Ola moves away from Bogdan's apartment.

Bogdan is noticeably sad without Ola. Zośka regrets her own actions and realizes that she has done wrong. She visits Ola, explains the situation regarding the fake profiles, apologizes, and tries to convince Ola to come back. Ola refuses, as Zośka intrigues made her realize that she's not a good mother and not very compatible with Bogdan.

One of the "Hania's" dates got together with Ola's former customer thanks to her hair. Zośka inadvertently calls Ola "mom" which prompts Bogdan to contact Ola. They grow together as a family again.

== Cast ==
- Maciej Stuhr—Tomek
- Agnieszka Więdłocha—Ania
- Piotr Głowacki—Marcel
- Weronika Książkiewicz—Ola
- Tomasz Karolak—Bogdan
- Joanna Jarmołowicz—Zośka
- Ewa Błaszczyk—Oktawia
- Michał Czernecki—Antoni
- Danuta Stenka—Ania's mother
- Katarzyna Bujakiewicz—Maria

== Sequel ==
Planet Single 2, written by Sam Akina and Jules Jones and directed by Sam Akina, was released on 5 November 2018. It became Poland's 3rd highest grossing film of 2018, earning a total of $9,167,737 worldwide, with all of that coming from international markets, as it was not released in the United States.
