= The Plagues of Breslau =

2018 Polish film

- Netflix poster
- Directed by: Patryk Vega
- Written by: Patryk Vega
- Produced by: Patryk Vega; Maciej Sojka; Grzegorz Esz; Jerzy Dzięgielewski
- Starring: Małgorzata Kożuchowska; Daria Widawska
- Cinematography: Miroslaw Kuba Brozek
- Music by: Łukasz Targosz
- Release date: 28 November 2018
- Running time: 93 minutes
- Country: Poland
- Language: Polish

The Plagues of Breslau (Polish: Plagi Breslau) is a 2018 Polish crime thriller directed by Patryk Vega. It premiered on 24 November 2018.

The title corresponds to the former name of Wrocław, which from 1741 until 1945 was "Breslau". The film and plot were loosely based on a series of crime novels by Marek Krajewski, who often incorporates Breslau's pre-war crime scene into his works.

== Plot ==
Set in the city of Wrocław, detective Helena Rus finds a corpse sewn in a cowhide. The murders continue for the next five days and each victim is killed at precisely 18:00 (6 p.m.). The Polish police along with Helena Rus attempt to find and capture the serial killer before he strikes again.

== Cast ==
- Małgorzata Kożuchowska as Helena Ruś
- Daria Widawska as Magda Drewniak / Iwona Bogacka
- Tomasz Oświeciński as Jarek "Bronson"
- Katarzyna Bujakiewicz as Nastka, Bronson's wife
- Andrzej Grabowski as public prosecutor
- Iwona Bielska as a pathomorphologist
- Ewa Kasprzyk as Alicja Drewniak
