= Andrzej Grabowski =

Polish actor, singer, and comedian (born 1952)

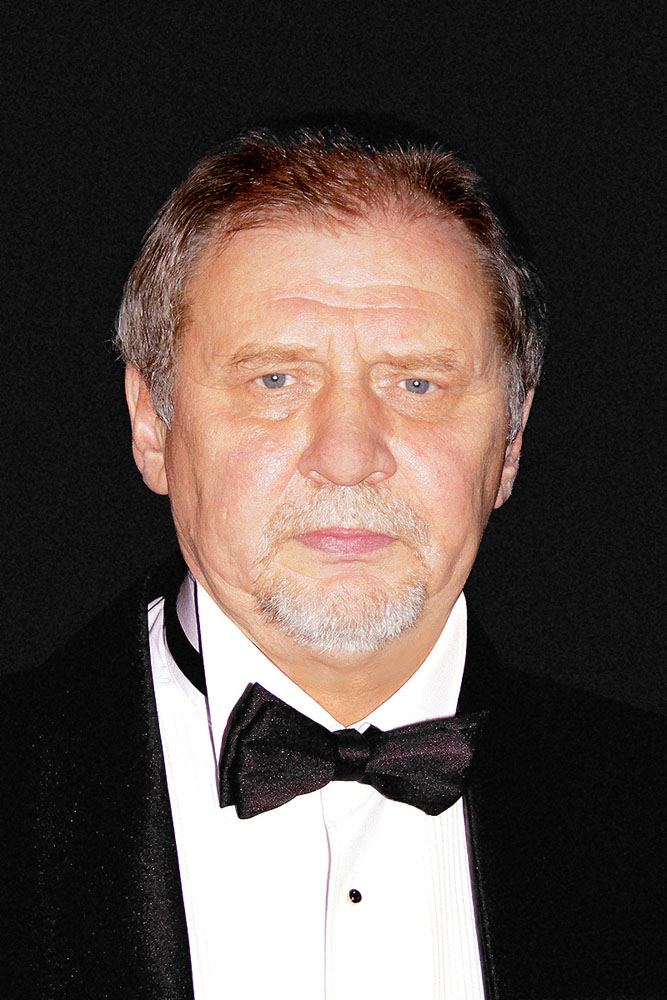
- Grabowski in 2011
- Born: 15 March 1952 (age 74); Chrzanów, Poland
- Education: Ludwik Solski Academy for the Dramatic Arts
- Occupations: Actor, comedian
- Spouse(s): Anna Tomaszewska (1982-2008, divorced); Anita Kruszewska (2009–2018, divorced)
- Children: 2
- Awards: Medal for Merit to Culture - Gloria Artis

Andrzej Piotr Grabowski (born 15 March 1952) is a Polish actor, singer and comedian. He is best known for playing the role of Ferdynand Kiepski in the TV series The Lousy World as well as being one of the judges on the Polish edition of Dancing with the Stars.

== Career ==
Grabowski graduated from Ludwik Solski Academy for the Dramatic Arts in Kraków in 1974, and shortly afterwards started to perform at Juliusz Słowacki Theatre. Two years later he starred in the play Przepraszam, czy tu biją. During his studies in Kraków, Grabowski debuted in the full-length movie, Odejścia, powroty. He played only supporting roles in films until 1989, when he played one of the main characters in the movie Kapitał, czyli jak zrobić pieniądze w Polsce.

Grabowski gained widespread popularity in 1999 when he started to play the main character Ferdynand Kiepski in the TV series The Lousy World. The show is still on air.

Grabowski's other notable appearances include the music video for "Pokaż mi niebo," a song by Polish band Feel, and the third season of Polish version of the French game show Fort Boyard. He is also known for his Polish dubbing for characters in movies such as Toy Story 3 and Chicken Little.

Grabowski was awarded the Medal for Merit to Culture – Gloria Artis in 2007 for outstanding contribution to Polish culture.

== Personal life ==
Grabowski was born on 15 March 1952 in Chrzanów, Poland. He was married to actress Anna Tomaszewska; the pair divorced in 2008. The marriage produced two daughters: Zuzanna and Katarzyna. Grabowski's son-in-law (and Zuzanna's husband) is Paweł Domagała.

On 12 June 2009 Grabowski married Anita Kruszewska, a make-up artist with whom he divorced in February 2018. From 2020, he has been in a relationship with actress Aldona Grochal.

His best man was the Polish actor Jan Nowicki.

== Filmography ==
- Too Old for Fairy Tales (2022) .... Waldek’s grandfather
- The Plagues of Breslau (2018) .... public prosecutor
- Spoor (2017) .... director
- Demon (2015) .... Zaneta's father
- Secret Wars (2014) .... Prior
- Operation H^{2}O (2012) .... Radek Szczemborski
- Skrzydlate świnie (2010) .... Edzio
- Milion dolarów (2010) .... Tomuś
- Piksele (2010) .... Grave-digger
- Lunatycy (2009) (TV) .... Wacław - Kama's father
- Tajemnica Westerplatte (2009) .... Adolf Petzelt
- Od pełni do pełni (2009) .... Kaminski
- Little Moscow (2008) .... Captain Wolniewicz
- Senność (2008) .... Father
- Mr. Kuka's Advice (2008) .... Kuka
- Jak żyć? (2008) .... Prisoner
- The Chauffeur (2008) .... Modrak
- Świadek koronny (2007) .... Jaroslaw Kowalik 'Kowal'
- Strike (2006) .... Sobieski
- Dublerzy (2006) .... Leon May
- We're All Christs (2006) .... Adas' Drinking Friend
- Diabeł (2005) .... Franciszek
- Pitbull (2005) .... Jacek Goc "Gebels"
- Atrakcyjny pozna panią (2004) .... Wacław
- Zróbmy sobie wnuka (2003) .... Maniek Kosela
- Superprodukcja (2003) .... Napoleon
- Jak to się robi z dziewczynami (2002) .... Zenon
- Golden Tears (2002)
- E=mc2 (2002) .... Zając
- Day of the Wacko (2002) .... Neighbour
- Kariera Nikosia Dyzmy (2002) .... Roman Kiliński
- Edges of the Lord (2001) .... Kluba
- Klinika pod wyrwigroszem (2001) (TV mini-series) .... Man
- The Tale of Mrs. Doughnut (2000) .... Palacz
- Liceum czarnej magii (2000) (TV) .... Tomasz Jarski
- With Fire and Sword (1999) (as A. Grabowski) .... Drunk Nobleman
- Odwrócona góra albo film pod strasznym tytułem (1999)
- Prostytutki (1998) .... Ula's Father
- Love Me and Do Whatever You Want (1998) .... Sergeant looking for Sławek
- Sława i chwała (1998) (TV mini-series) .... Golicz
- La ballata dei lavavetri (1998) .... Paweł
- Colonel Kwiatkowski (1995) .... Priest
- Polska śmierć (1995) .... Sergeant
- Cudowne miejsce (1994) .... Moon
- Śmierć jak kromka chleba (1994) .... Miner
- Kapitał, czyli jak zrobić pieniądze w Polsce (1990) .... Stefan Sapieja
- Dulscy (1976) .... Office worker

=== TV series ===
- The Thaw (2022) as Jan Zawieja
- The Lousy World (1999—2022) .... Ferdynand Kiepski
- Blondynka (2010-now) .... Traczyk
- Duch w dom (2010) .... Kazimierz
- Nowa .... Janusz Sochon (1 episode, 2010)
- Naznaczony .... Puchalik (2 episodes, 2009)
- Ojciec Mateusz .... Coach Sylwester (1 episode, 2009)
- Tylko miłość .... Max Wolar (26 episodes, 2007–2009)
- Pitbull .... Jacek Goc 'Gebels' (31 episodes, 2005–2008)
- Odwróceni .... Jaroslaw 'Kowal' Kowalik (11 episodes, 2007)
- Ja wam pokażę! (2007) .... Homeless man
- Hela w opałach .... Policeman (1 episode, 2006)
- Złotopolscy .... Andrzej Złotopolski (2004–2006)
- The Nanny .... Lucjan Furman (1 episode, 2006)
- Boża podszewka. Część druga (2005) .... Andrzej Jurewicz
- Na dobre i na złe .... Father Kudelko (1 episode, 2002)
- Der Kapitän .... Eike (1 episode, 1997)
- Boża podszewka (1997) .... Andrzej Jurewicz
- Spellbinder: Land of the Dragon Lord .... Gan (4 episodes, 1997)

== Polish dubbing ==
- 2010: Harry Potter and the Deathly Hallows – Part 1 .... Alastor Moody
- 2010: Toy Story 3 .... Lots-O'-Huggin' Bear
- 2009: Gwiazda Kopernika
- 2009: Race to Witch Mountain .... Burke
- 2008: Space Chimps .... Dr. Jagu
- 2008: Speed Racer .... Dad
- 2007: Enchanted .... Nathaniel
- 2007: Harry Potter and the Order of the Phoenix .... Alastor Moody
- 2005: Harry Potter and the Goblet of Fire .... Alastor Moody
- 2005: Chicken Little .... Buck "Ace" Cluck
- 2003: Brother Bear .... Rutt
- 2001: Abrafax i piraci z Karaibów .... Captain

== Discography ==
Title	Album details	Peak chart positions
Title	Album details	POL
Mam prawo...czasami... banalnie	Released: 29 November 2010; Label: Universal Music Poland; Formats: CD, CD+DVD, digital download	36
Cudne jest nudne	Released: 18 June 2013; Label: Universal Music Poland; Formats: CD, digital download	30
"—" denotes a recording that did not chart or was not released in that territory.
