= Mirosław Kuba Brożek =

Polish cinematographer

Miroslaw Kuba Brozek
- Born: Poland
- Occupation: Cinematographer
- Notable work: Pushpa: The Rise (2021); Pushpa 2: The Rule (2024)

Mirosław Kuba Brożek is a Polish cinematographer who primarily works in Polish and Telugu-language films.

== Career ==
Indian filmmaker Vikram Kumar came across Kuba's work in Polish cinema while shooting for one of his earlier films in Poland. Impressed by his talent, Vikram offered an opportunity to collaborate on Gang Leader (2019). Another Indian filmmaker, Sukumar, was impressed with his work in Gang Leader, and subsequently invited him to join Pushpa: The Rise (2021) and its sequel, Pushpa 2: The Rule (2024).

== Filmography ==
=== As cinematographer ===
Key
†	Denotes films that have not yet been released

Year	Title	Language	Notes
2005	Pitbull	Polish	
2014	Secret Wars	Polish	
2017	Botoks	Polish	
2018	Women of Mafia	Polish	
2018	The Plagues of Breslau	Polish	
2019	Nani's Gang Leader	Telugu	
2021	Pushpa: The Rise	Telugu	
2024	Pushpa 2: The Rule	Telugu	

== Awards ==
Awards and nominations received by Miroslaw Kuba Brozek
Date	Award	Category	Work(s)	Result	Ref.
2022	Filmfare Awards South	Best Cinematographer – Telugu	Pushpa: The Rise	Won	
2022	South Indian International Movie Awards	Best Cinematographer – Telugu	Pushpa: The Rise	Nominated	
