= Marcin Dorociński =

Polish actor (born 1973)

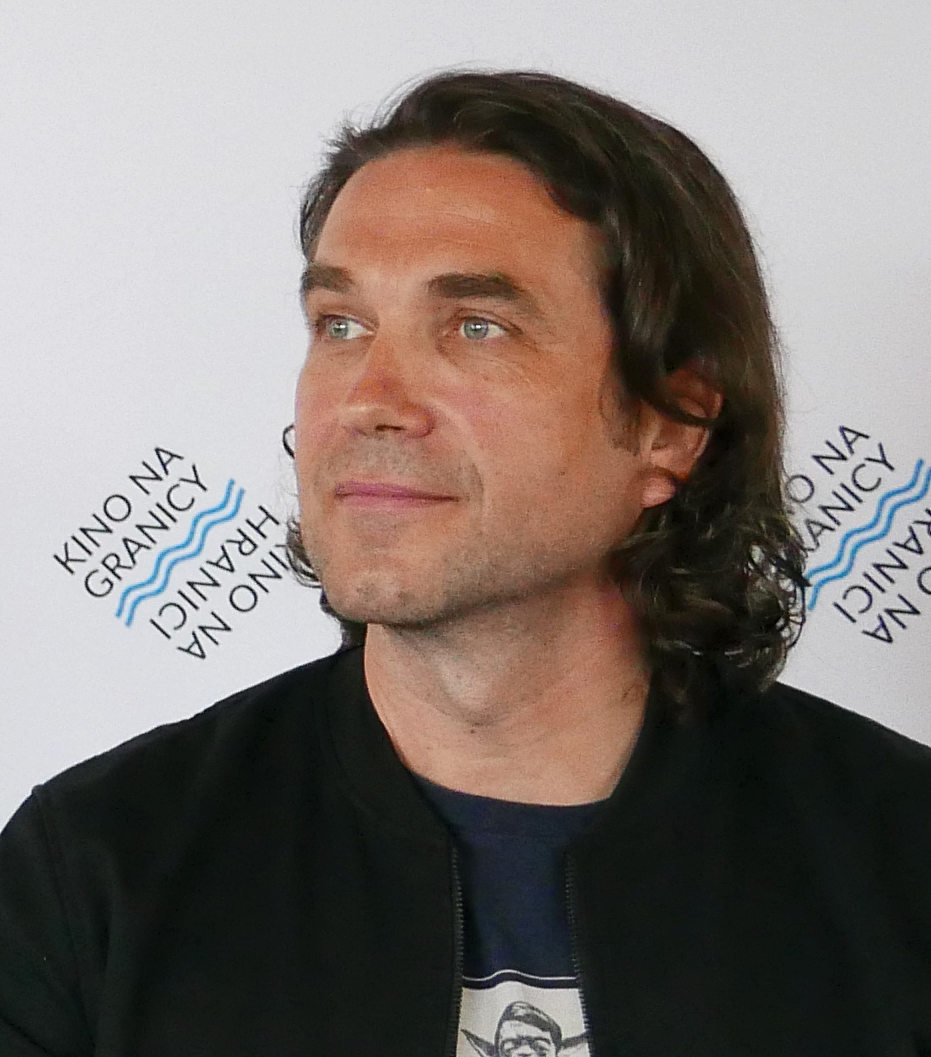
- Marcin Dorocinski in 2019
- Born: Marcin Grzegorz Dorociński; 22 June 1973 (age 53); Milanówek, Poland
- Education: Aleksander Zelwerowicz State Theatre Academy (MFA)
- Occupation: Actor
- Years active: 1994–present
- Honours: Silver Medal for Merit to Culture – Gloria Artis

Marcin Grzegorz Dorociński (Polish: [ˈmart͡ɕin dɔrɔˈt͡ɕiɲskʲi]; born 22 June 1973) is a Polish film, television and stage actor. He is known for playing roles in such films as Pitbull (2005), Reverse (2009), Rose (2011), Jack Strong (2014), Hurricane (2018), Mission: Impossible – Dead Reckoning Part One (2023) and Mayday (2026) as well as internationally produced TV series Spies of Warsaw (2013) and The Queen's Gambit (2020).

== Early life ==
Dorociński was born in Milanówek near Warsaw and grew up in Kłudzienko. His father is a blacksmith and his mother is a housewife. He has three brothers, all of whom are police officers. He dreamt of becoming a professional football player, but he was forced to give up the plan after sustaining a major leg injury. He attended the vocational school in Grodzisk Mazowiecki and obtained a machinist certificate. The first person to notice his talent for acting was his history teacher, who encouraged him to become an actor. In 1993, he enrolled at the Aleksander Zelwerowicz State Theatre Academy.

== Career ==
In his second-year at the State Theatre Academy, he was cast as Don Rodrigue in a television adaptation of Le Cid directed by Krystyna Janda. After graduating from the Academy in 1997, he struggled to find acting jobs at first. He worked as a waiter, a bouncer and took other casual jobs until he was offered a post at the Dramatic Theatre in Warsaw. He has also appeared in several plays in the Ateneum Theatre in Warsaw, in which he is currently employed.

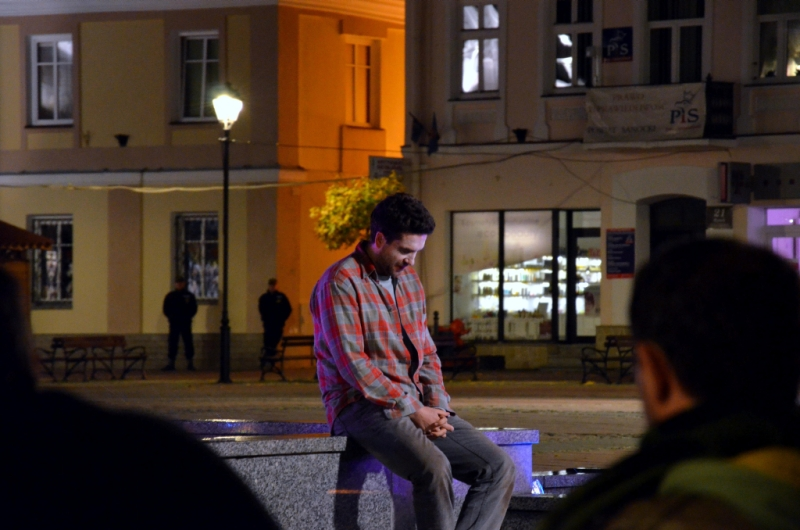
Dorociński filming in Sanok on 2013

He played minor roles in multiple television series, before his breakthrough came with the role in Patryk Vega's 2005 film Pitbull, which brought him the Zbyszek Cybulski Award. He is a two-time Polish Film Festival award winner for his roles in Reverse (2009) and Rose (2011). The latter also earned him the IFFI Best Actor Award at the 43rd International Film Festival of India. In 2012, he received the Paszport Polityki award. In 2012, he appeared in Magdalena Łazarkiewicz's critically-acclaimed TV series The Deep End ("Głęboka woda") which earned him a nomination for Best Actor Award at the Monte Carlo Television Festival. Between 2012 and 2013, Dorociński appeared in a mini-series called Spies of Warsaw, co-produced by the BBC and Telewizja Polska.

In 2020, he joined the cast of the Netflix drama miniseries The Queen's Gambit starring Anya Taylor-Joy. Based on the 1983 novel by Walter Tevis of the same name, the show explores the life of an orphan chess prodigy named Beth Harmon from the age of eight to twenty-two, as she struggles with addiction in a quest to become a grandmaster in chess. Dorociński plays Soviet world chess champion and Beth's opponent Vasily Borgov.

== Personal life ==
He is married to scenic designer Monika Sudół. The couple has a son Stanisław (born 2006) and a daughter Janina (born 2008). They also brought up Sudół's son from a previous relationship, Jakub.

== Filmography ==
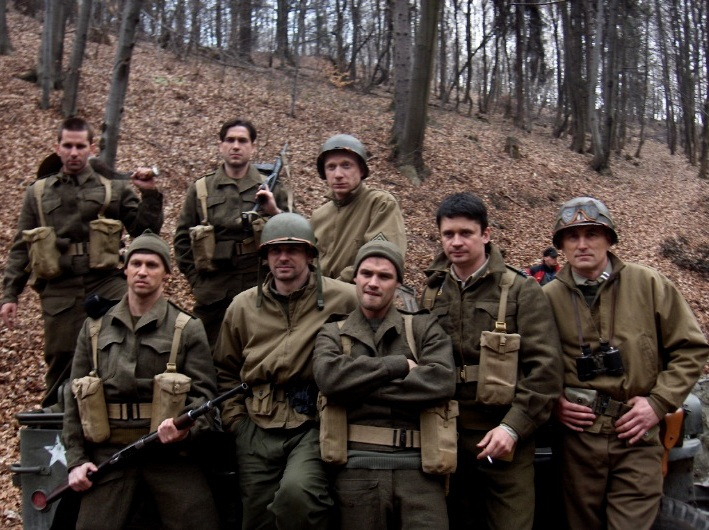
Dorociński with the cast of Mystery of the Codes Stronghold (2006).

| Year | Title | Original title | Role | Notes |
|---|---|---|---|---|
| 1996 | The Shaman | Szamanka | Student in the street | |
| 1999 | Two Killers | Kilerów 2-óch | "Young wolf” Mirosław | |
| 1999 | Krugerandy | Krugerandy | Arek Bliski | |
| 1999 | Torowisko | Torowisko | Zbyszek | |
| 2001 | Przedwiośnie | Przedwiośnie | Antoni Lulek | |
| 2002 | Where Eskimos Live | Tam, gdzie żyją Eskimosi | Musician at the baptism | |
| 2002 | Sfora: Bez litości | Sfora: Bez litości | Office of State Protection officer | |
| 2003 | Nienasycenie | Nienasycenie | General Niehyd-Ochluj | |
| 2003 | Show | Show | Roman, show participant | |
| 2004 | Vinci | Vinci | Lieutenant Łukasz Wilk | |
| 2005 | 1409. Afera na zamku Barnstein | 1409. Afera na zamku Barnstein | White knight (Witcher) | |
| 2005 | Pitbull | Pitbull | 2nd Lieutenant Sławomir "Despero" Desperski | |
| 2006 | Dzisiaj jest piątek | Dzisiaj jest piątek | Maniek | |
| 2006 | Francuski numer | Francuski numer | Mateusz | |
| 2006 | Wstyd | Wstyd | Teacher Jan | |
| 2006 | We're All Christs | Wszyscy jesteśmy Chrystusami | Angel of Evil | |
| 2007 | Ogród Luizy | Ogród Luizy | Fabian "Fabio" Sawicki | |
| 2008 | Boisko bezdomnych | Boisko bezdomnych | Jacek Mróz | |
| 2008 | Rozmowy nocą | Rozmowy nocą | Bartek | |
| 2009 | Idealny facet dla mojej dziewczyny | Idealny facet dla mojej dziewczyny | Kostek Chmurski | |
| 2009 | Miłość na wybieгу | Miłość na wybiegu | Photographer Kacper | |
| 2009 | Reverse | Rewers | Bronisław / son of Sabina | |
| 2009 | Piotrek trzynastego | Piotrek trzynastego | "Terrarium" | |
| 2010 | The Woman That Dreamed About a Man | Kvinden der drømte om en mand | Maciej Kockhański | |
| 2011 | Lęk wysokości | Lęk wysokości | Tomek | |
| 2011 | Rose | Róża | Tadeusz | |
| 2011 | Jesteś Bogiem | Jesteś Bogiem | Concert organiser | |
| 2012 | Obława | Obława | Corporal "Wydra" | |
| 2012 | Miłość | Miłość | Tomek | |
| 2013 | Traffic Department | Drogówka | St. Sgt. Krzysztof Lisowski | |
| 2013 | Spies of Warsaw | Spies of Warsaw | Colonel Antoni Pakulski | TV series |
| 2014 | The Mighty Angel | Pod Mocnym Aniołem | Borys | |
| 2014 | Jack Strong | Jack Strong | Colonel Ryszard Kukliński (Jack Strong) | |
| 2015–2016 | Pakt | Pakt | Mirek Milewski | TV series |
| 2015 | Star Wars: The Force Awakens | Star Wars: The Force Awakens | Kylo Ren | Polish dubbing |
| 2016 | Cape Town | Cape Town | Christian Coolidge | TV series |
| 2016 | Anthropoid | Anthropoid | Ladislav Vaněk | |
| 2017 | Dræberne fra Nibe | Dræberne fra Nibe | Igor Ladpolny | |
| 2018 | Hurricane | 303. Bitwa o Anglię | Witold Urbanowicz | Released in the US as Mission of Honor |
| 2018 | Playing Hard | Zabawa, zabawa | Jerzy | |
| 2020 | The Queen's Gambit | The Queen's Gambit | Vasily Borgov | Miniseries |
| 2021 | The In-Laws | Teściowie | Andrzej | |
| 2023 | Vikings: Valhalla | Vikings: Valhalla | Yaroslav the Wise | TV series (Season 2) |
| 2023 | Mission: Impossible – Dead Reckoning Part One | Mission: Impossible – Dead Reckoning Part One | Submarine Captain | |
| 2023 | Ransomed | 비공식작전 (Bigongsikjakjeon) | Hays | South Korean film |
| 2025 | Mission: Impossible – The Final Reckoning | Mission: Impossible – The Final Reckoning | Submarine Captain | Post-production |
| 2026 | Mayday | Mayday | Alexander Volkov | |
| 2026 | The Doll | The Doll | Stanisław Wokulski | |

== Awards and honours ==
- 2005: Zbigniew Cybulski Award for Best Young Polish Actor
- 2009: Best Supporting Actor Award at the Gdynia Film Festival for Reverse
- 2011: Best Actor Award at the Gdynia Film Festival for Rose
- 2012: IFFI Best Actor Award at the 43rd International Film Festival of India for Rose
- 2012: Paszport Polityki in the film category awarded annually by the Polityka weekly magazine
- 2014: Silver Medal Gloria Artis, conferred by the Ministry of Culture and National Heritage of the Republic of Poland
- 2021: Wiktor Award for Best Actor

== See also ==
- Cinema of Poland
- List of Polish actors
