= The Man with the Magic Box =

Polish science fiction film

The Man with the Magic Box (Polish: Człowiek z magicznym pudełkiem) is a 2017 science fiction dystopia thriller film written and directed by Polish film director Bodo Kox. The film is set in 2030 of Orwellian Poland and involves elements of time travel to the times of Communist Poland of 1950s.

== Cast ==
- Olga Bołądź—Goria
- Piotr Polak—Adam
- Sebastian Stankiewicz—Sebastian
- Helena Norowicz—Urszula Stefanka
- Wojciech Zielinski—Agent Jan Tragosz
- Bartlomiej Firlet—Kowalsky Radzimir
- Bartosz Cao—Son of Prol
- Anna Konieczna—Agent Maria Torunska
- Agata Buzek—Doctor
- Arkadiusz Jakubik—Emfazy Stefanski
- Bogdan Koca—Prol Collector
- Roma Kox—Young Urszula Stefanska
- Bartosz Bielenia—Bibi
- Bartosz Adamczyk—Assistant Heniek
- Kamil Tolinski—Assistant Stanislaw

== Awards ==
- 2017: Asteroide award of the international Trieste Science+Fiction Festival
- 2017: Award for music at the Gdynia Film Festival, Poland
- 2017: GreenBox award at the Bluebox Film Festival, Olsztyn, Poland
