= Mitja Okorn =

Slovenian film director and screenwriter (born 1981)

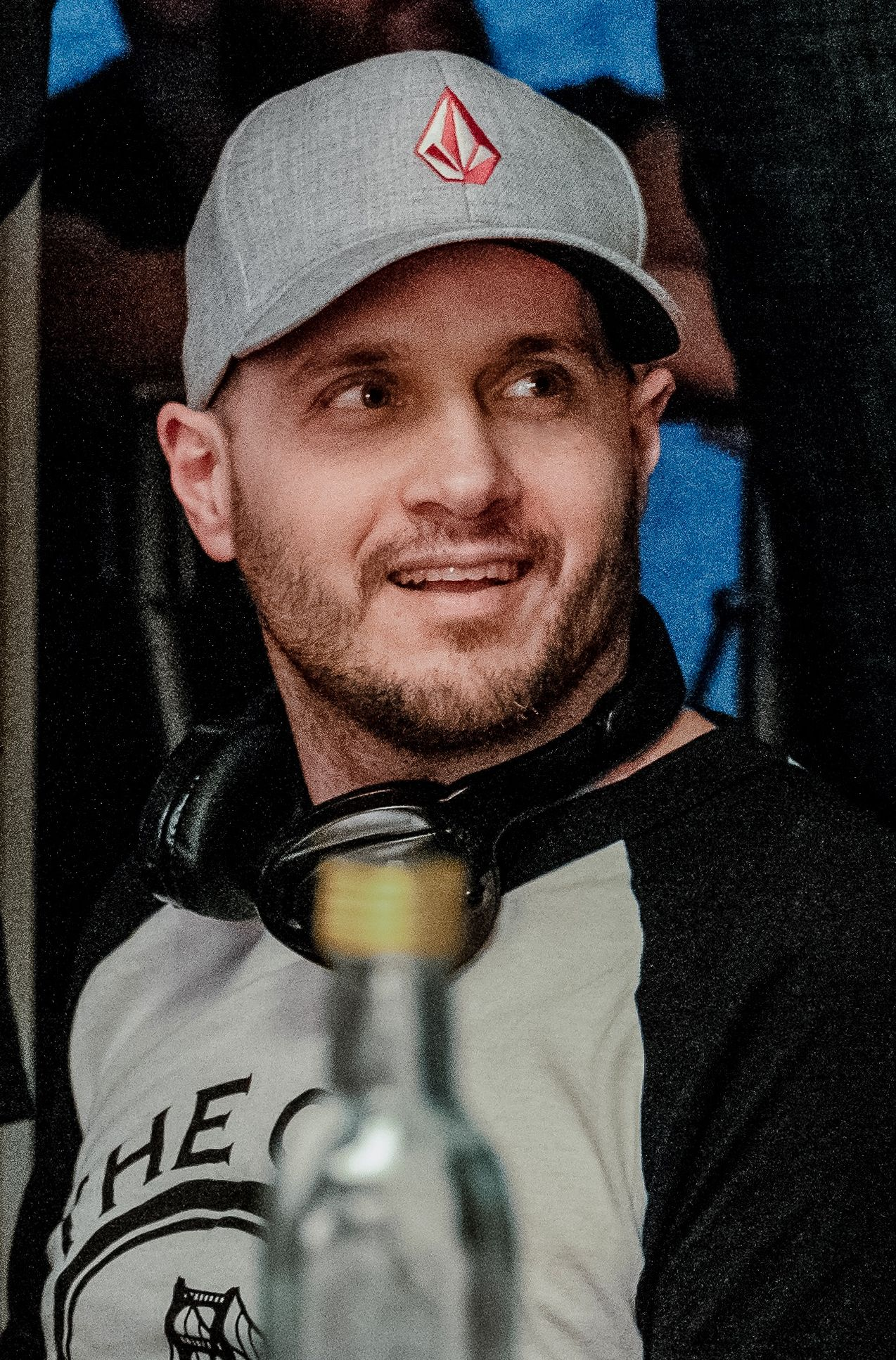
- Mitja Okorn
- Born: 26 January 1981 (age 45); Kranj, SR Slovenia, Yugoslavia
- Occupations: Film director; screenwriter
- Years active: 2005–present
- Works: Letters to Santa (2011); Planet Single (2016); Life in a Year (2020)

Mitja Okorn (born 26 January 1981) is a Slovenian film director and screenwriter. Most known as director of Letters to Santa, Planet Single and his Hollywood debut Life in a Year.

== Early life ==
He was born on 26 January 1981 in Kranj. He studied at the School of Economics and Business in University of Ljubljana, but dropped out in his junior year.

== Career ==
=== 2005: First feature film ===
In 2000 he started his career with two short documentaries Not sponsored 1 and Not sponsored 2; and awarded for short film Be Flexible at Motovun Film Festival in 2002. His career started to bloom in 2005 when he directed his first feature film Tu pa tam (Here and There) which premiered at his 24th birthday, a Slovenian film shown also at Sunderland Film Festival. This opened him doors to shoot numerous adds and music videos for Slovenian artists such as Dan D, Omar Naber, Alya, Elvis Jackson, Select, C.R.A.S.H, Kocka and Jah Waggie.

=== 2007–2016: Success in Poland ===
In the fall of 2007 he was invited by TVN, a Polish commercial television, to direct and co-write the first season of the TV series 39 i pół (2008–09).

In 2011 he directed his first international feature film, the romantic comedy Letters to Santa (Listy do M.) distributed by ITI Cinema, a success in Poland with a box office performance of over $12 million. It was the most watched movie in Poland in 2011. With a cinema run of 130 days, it is the second longest screening film in Polish cinema history, second only to Titanic. Broadcasting rights were sold to various TV stations in Poland, the Czech Republic, Latvia and Slovenia.

In 2016 he directed his second Polish feature film, the romantic comedy Planet Single (Planeta Singli) distributed by Kino Świat, a commercial success in Poland. The film was nominated for the Golden Lion Award in the main category at 41st Film Festival in Gdynia.

=== 2017–2020: Debut in Hollywood ===
In 2017 he completed his Hollywood debut Life in a Year, an American romantic drama film, starring Jaden Smith, Cara Delevingne and Cuba Gooding Jr., which was produced by Overbrook Entertainment, co-owned by Will Smith and distributed by Columbia Pictures. It was released three years later due to some issues between production company and distributor. He became the first ever Slovenian director in Hollywood and one of few Slovenians in the heart of film industry.

== Filmography ==
Film

Year	Title	Director	Writer	Producer
2005	Tu pa tam	Yes	Yes	Yes
2011	Letters to Santa	Yes	No	No
2016	Planet Single	Yes	Yes	No
2020	Tobulas Pasimatymas	No	Yes	No
2020	All My Friends Are Dead	No	No	Yes
2020	Life in a Year	Yes	No	No
2021	Girls to Buy	No	Yes	No
2024	Boxer	Yes	Yes	No

Television

Year	Title	Note
2008	39 and a Half	18 episodes
