= Usta usta =

- Genre: Comedy drama
- Created by: Mike Bullen (original series)
- Written by: Bartek Ignaciuk; Maciej Kowalczuk
- Starring: Paweł Wilczak; Magdalena Różczka; Sonia Bohosiewicz; Wojciech Mecwaldowski; Magdalena Popławska; Marcin Perchuć
- Composer: Łukasz Targosz
- Country of origin: Poland
- Original language: Polish
- No. of seasons: 4 (5 recording)
- No. of episodes: 41 (50 in plans)

Production
- Executive producers: Dariusz Gąsiorowski; Dorota Chamczyk
- Producer: Wojciech Bockenheim
- Production location: Warsaw
- Cinematography: Tomasz Dobrowolski
- Running time: 42 minutes
- Production company: TVN

Original release
- Network: TVN
- Release: 6 March 2010 – 17 May 2021

Usta Usta is a Polish comedy-drama television series based on the British series Cold Feet. It ran on TVN for three seasons from March 6, 2010, to May 3, 2011. The fourth season ran on TVN from September 6, 2020.

== Cast members ==
| Actor | Role | Seasons |
|---|---|---|
| Paweł Wilczak | Adam Dawidzki | 1-5 |
| Sonia Bohosiewicz | Izabela Nowak | 1-5 |
| Wojciech Mecwaldowski | Piotr Nowak | 1-5 |
| Magdalena Popławska | Agnieszka Kornatowska | 1-5 |
| Marcin Perchuć | Krzysztof Kornatowski | 1-5 |
| Edyta Olszówka | Agata | 5 |
| Anna Czartoryska | Magda | 4-5 |
| Paweł Małaszyński | Dominik, Magda's lover | 4-5 |
| Mateusz Damięcki | Michał | 4 |
| Aniela Płudowska | Zofia Kornatowska | 4-5 |
| Olga Rayska | Zuzanna Kornatowska | 4-5 |
| Maciej Marcin Tomaszewski | Leon Dawidzki, Adam and Julia's son | 4-5 |
| Elena Leszczyńska | Oksana | 1-3, 5 |
| Magdalena Różczka | Julia Hoffman | 1-3 |
| Karolina Gorczyca | Lena Adler | 2-3 |
| Mariusz Zaniewski | Sebastian | 1 |
| Dorota Segda | Ewa | 1 |
| Lude Reno | Jan | 1 |
| Antonina Girycz | Grandmother Zosia | 1-3 |
| Zdzisław Wardejn | Grandfather Żelisław | 1 |
| Tomira Kowalik | Stefa | 4 |
| Adam Krawczuk | Bożydar | 1 |
| Jacek Koman | Paweł Śliwiński | 1 |
| Agata Załęcka | Jola | 1 |
| Bożena Dykiel | Felicja | 1 |
| Marina Łuczenko | Emilia | 1 |
| Magdalena Stużyńska | Monika | 1 |
| Szymon Mysłakowski | Dorian | 1 |
| Oskar Hamerski | Mikołaj | 1 |
| Dorota Kolak | Irena | 2 |
| Przemysław Sadowski | Robert | 2 |
| Henryk Talar | Feliks | 2 |
| Bartłomiej Topa | Mateusz | 2 |
| Bartłomiej Świderski | Michał Werner | 2 |
| Marta Ścisłowicz | Ania | 2 |
| Tamara Arciuch | Beata Motyl | 2 |
| Anna Mucha | Anita | 2 |
| Wiktoria Filus | Sara Eichental | 4 |
| Zygmunt Malanowicz | Tadeusz Żurawicz | 4 |
