= Pakt (TV series) =

Polish television series

- Genre: Detective; crime; thriller
- Created by: Vegard Eriksen Stenberg; Gjermund Eriksen
- Based on: Mammon
- Written by: Maciej Kubicki; Andrzej Golda; Marcin Kubawski; Przemyslaw Nowakowski; Joanna Pawluskiewicz; Jaroslaw Kaminski; Milosz Sakowski
- Directed by: Marek Lechki; Leszek Dawid
- Starring: Marcin Dorociński; Witold Dębicki; Adam Woronowicz; Mariusz Bonaszewski
- Composer: Łukasz Targosz
- Country of origin: Poland
- Original language: Polish
- No. of seasons: 2
- No. of episodes: 12

Production
- Executive producers: Izabela Lopuch; Johnathan Young
- Producers: Anna Kepinska; Maciej Kubicki; Anna Nagler
- Production location: Poland
- Cinematography: Pawel Flis
- Editor: Maciej Pawlinski
- Running time: 60 minutes
- Production company: HBO Europe

Original release
- Release: 8 November 2015 – 2016

Pakt (English: "The Pact") is a Polish television series that originally aired on HBO Europe, running for two seasons between 2015 and 2016, about a journalist who investigates a web of lies and betrayal. The first season was based on the Norwegian TV series Mammon, while season 2 was an original concept. Pakt was one of the first series produced by HBO's international affiliates to be optioned for its American video-on-demand platform, HBO Now.

== Principal cast ==
- Marcin Dorociński as Piotr Grodecki, journalist
- Witold Dębicki as Andrzej, newspaper editor
- Adam Woronowicz as Dariusz Skalski, finance minister
- Mariusz Bonaszewski as prime minister
