= Daria Widawska =

Polish actress (born 1977)

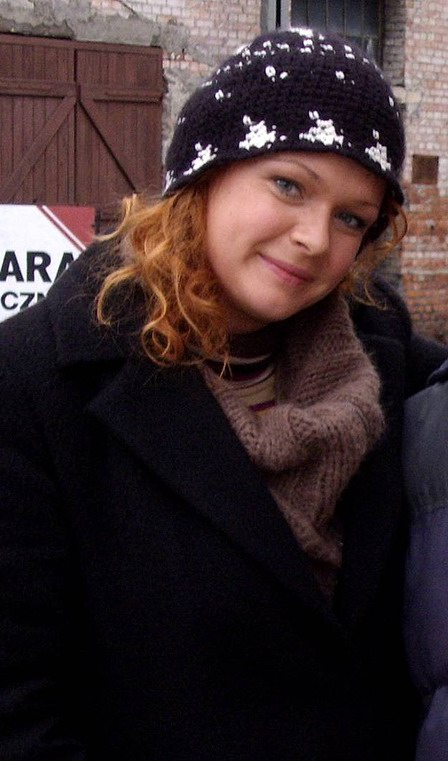
- Brodzik at the Festiwal Gwiazd in Gdańsk, 2006
- Born: Daria Jarosińska; 1 May 1977 (age 49); Gdańsk, Poland
- Occupation: Actress
- Years active: 1999–present
- Partner: Michał Jarosiński (2007–present)

Daria Widawska (born 1 May 1977 in Gdańsk, Poland) is a Polish actress.

== Acting roles ==
- 2022 : The Office PL
- 2018 : The Plagues of Breslau (as Magda Drewniak/Iwona Bogacka)
- 2008-2009: 39 i pół (as Anna)
- 2007 : Mamuśki (as Zyta)
- 2007 : Hania (as the preceptress)
- 2006 : Hela w opałach (as Zofia)
- 2006 : Faceci do wzięcia (as Basia Gołębiewska)
- 2006 : Egzamin z życia (as Adrianna)
- 2005 2007 : Magda M. (as Agata Bielecka)
- 2005 : Klinika samotnych serc (as Monika)
- 2004 : Na dobre i na złe (as Tomaszewska)
- 2003 : Tygrysy Europy (as Karolcia)
- 2003-2006 : Na Wspólnej (as receptionist)
- 2003 : M jak miłość (as Beata)
- 2000 : Twarze i maski (as the young actress)
- 1999 : Tygrysy Europy (as Karolcia)
