= 39 and a Half =

Polish comedy-drama television series

- The promotional image with the cast of 39 and a Half.
- Genre: Comedy drama
- Written by: Doman Nowakowski; Dorota Mierzejewska; Tomasz Cichoń
- Directed by: Mitja Okorn; Łukasz Palkowski; Łukasz Jaworski
- Starring: Tomasz Karolak; Daria Widawska; Alan Andersz; Magdalena Lamparska; Sonia Bohosiewicz; Krzysztof Stelmaszyk; Dorota Deląg
- Composer: Łukasz Targosz
- Country of origin: Poland
- Original language: Polish
- No. of series: 3
- No. of episodes: 39

Production
- Producer: Justyna Pawlak
- Cinematography: Michał Englert; Michał Nowakowski; Tomasz Naumiuk
- Editors: Jarosław Barzan; Krzysztof Boruń
- Running time: 45 minutes
- Production company: TVN Group

Original release
- Network: TVN
- Release: 4 March 2008 – 1 December 2009

Related
- 39 and Half Weeks (2019)

39 and a Half (Polish: 39 i pół) is a Polish-language comedy-drama television series aired in Poland on TVN from 4 March 2008 to 1 December 2009. It was directed by Mitja Okorn, Łukasz Palkowski, and Łukasz Jaworski, written by Doman Nowakowski, Dorota Mierzejewska, and Tomasz Cichoń, and produced by Justyna Pawlak. The series consists of three seasons, with 39 episodes, each approximately 45 minutes long. It follows Darek Jankowski, unemployed former amateur punk rock mmusician living in Warsaw, Poland, who grapples with the midlife crisis, as he is about to turn 40 years old.

The series was continued with a short television film titled I pół (Polish: [ˈi ˈpuw]; lit. 'And a half'), which aired on 1 December 2009, after the premiere of its last episode. It was further continued with the sequel television series 39 and Half Weeks, which aired from 18 February 2019 to 8 June 2019.

== Premise ==
Darek Jankowski is a 39-year-old unemployed former amateur punk rock musician living in Warsaw, Poland, who grapples with the midlife crisis, as he is about to turn 40 years old. He decides to get a stable job and reconnect with his ex-wife and his son, whom he had abandoned 7 years prior.

== Cast ==
- Tomasz Karolak as Darek Jankowski, former amateur musician
- Daria Widawska as Anna Jankowska, Darek's wife
- Alan Andersz as Patryk Jankowski, Darek's son
- Magdalena Lamparska as Marta Jankowska, Patryk's wife
- Sonia Bohosiewicz as Paula, Anna's neighbour
- Krzysztof Stelmaszyk as Tomasz Ostoja, Anna's fiance
- Dorota Deląg as Kasia Cichocka, Darek's ex-girlfriend and boss
- Magdalena Zawadzka as Krystyna Sobańsk, Anna's mother
- Leonard Pietraszak as Warcisław Sobański, Anna's father

== Production and release ==
39 and a Half was directed by Mitja Okorn, Łukasz Palkowski, and Łukasz Jaworski, written by Doman Nowakowski, Dorota Mierzejewska, and Tomasz Cichoń, and produced by Justyna Pawlak. The cinematography was done by Michał Englert, Michał Nowakowski, and Tomasz Naumiuk, the editing by Jarosław Barzan, and Krzysztof Boruń, the music by Łukasz Targosz, the scenography by Joanna Doroszkiewicz, and the costumes by Małgorzata Stefaniak, and Magdalena Jadwiga Rutkiewicz. The series was produced and distributed by TVN, and filmed in Warsaw, Poland. It aired from 4 March 2008 to 1 December 2009, and has 39 episodes in total, spanning 3 seasons. Each episode has a running time of 45 minutes.

== Episodes ==
Series	Episodes	Originally released		
Series	Episodes	First released	Last released	Network
1	13	4 March 2008	27 May 2008	TVN
2	13	3 March 2009	26 May 2009	TVN
3	13	8 September 2009	1 December 2009	TVN

== Reception ==
In 2008, in an review by web portal Wirtualne Media, published a week after the series premier, it was described as to follow a familiar television formula, with its writing being criticised, and the believability and realism of the main character being questioned. Its first season had an average of around 3.23 million viewers per episode, making it the most popular series in its time slot among the Polish television channels. Its average viewership decreased to around 2.33 million in the second season, and to around 2.26 million in the third season. In 2019, the web portal Onet.pl described 39 and a Half retrospectively as interesting and original series, thanks to focusing on the middle life crisis, an aspect usually marginalised in Polish television at the time, however stating that it eventually "lost its momentum", and was taken of the air after three seasons. The series received awards in 2008 and 2009, for the best comedy series at the Festival of Good Humor in Gdańsk, Poland. The lead actor, Tomasz Karolak, also received the award for the best comedy male actor at the Festival of Good Humor in Gdańsk in 2008, and the Telecamera award for the best actor in 2009. The series were also nominated to the Telecamera awards for the best comedy series in 2008 and for the best original comedy series in 2010.

== Continuations ==
The series was continued with a short television film titled I pół (lit. 'And a Half'), which aired on 1 December 2009, after the premiere of its last episode. It was directed by Maciej Szwabe, written by Doman Nowakowski, and produced by Justyna Pawlak. It was further continued with the television series 39 and Half Weeks, which aired from 18 February 2019 to 8 June 2019.

== Accolades ==
Accolades received by 39 and a Half
Award	Year	Category	Recipient	Result	Ref.
Festival of Good Humor in Gdańsk	2008	Best comedy series	39 and a Half	Won	
Festival of Good Humor in Gdańsk	2009	Best comedy series	39 and a Half	Won	
Festival of Good Humor in Gdańsk	2009	Best comedy male actor	Tomasz Karolak	Won	
Telecameras	2009	Best comedy series	39 and a Half	Nominated	
Telecameras	2009	Best male actor	Tomasz Karolak	Won	
Telecameras	2010	Best original comedy series	39 and a Half	Nominated	
