= Warsaw Pact (TV series) =

Polish TV crime series

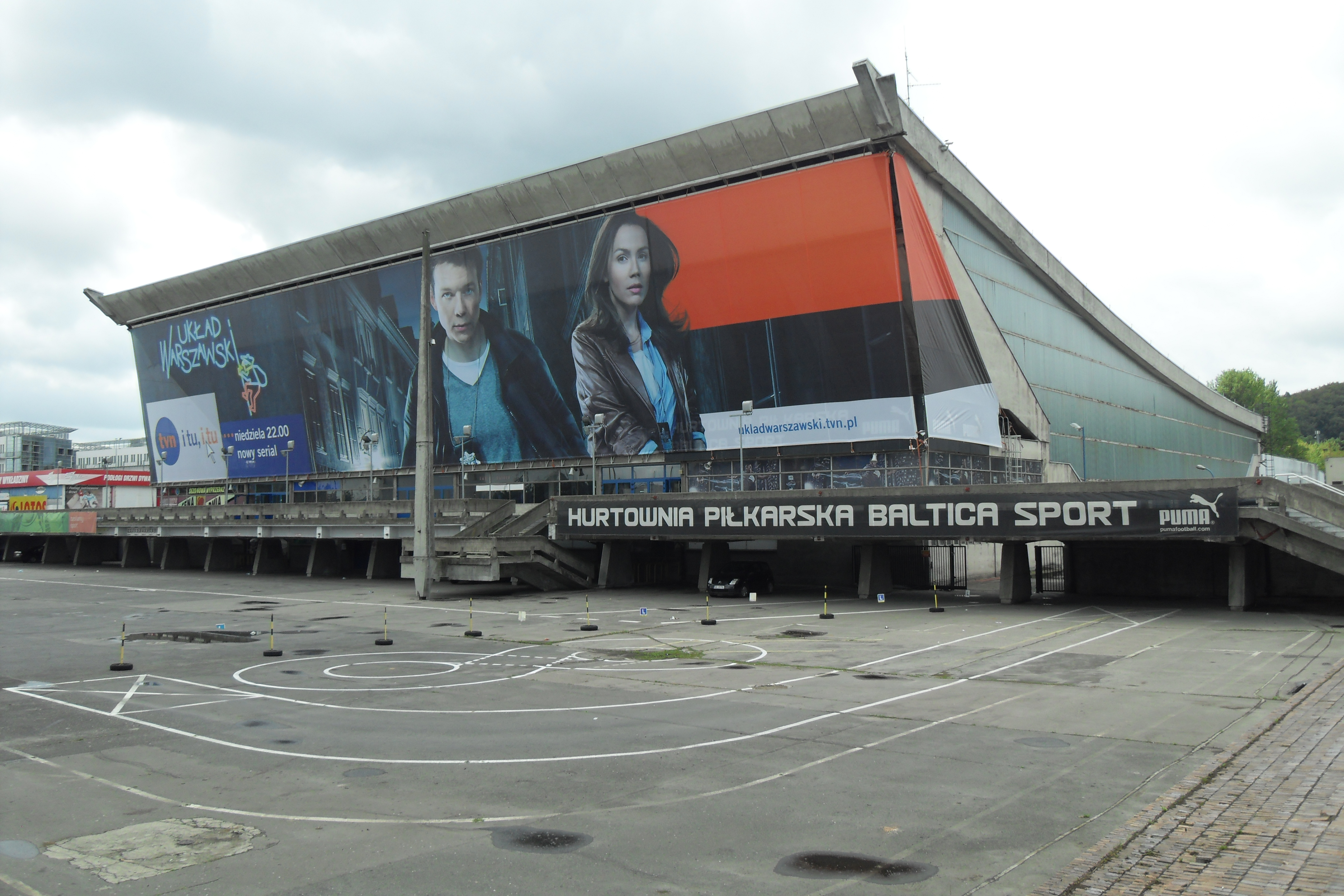
- Billboard advertising the series
- Genre: Crime series
- Directed by: Łukasz Jaworski
- Starring: Lesław Żurek; Olga Bołądź; Adam Ferency; Bartłomiej Topa
- Country of origin: Poland
- Original language: Polish
- No. of seasons: 1
- No. of episodes: 13

Production
- Running time: 44 minutes

Original release
- Network: TVN
- Release: 4 September – 27 November 2011

Warsaw Pact (Polish: Układ warszawski, (Polish pronunciation: [Ukwat Varʂafski]) is a Polish TV crime series that premiered on 4 September 2011 on TVN. The series was directed by Łukasz Jaworski. It was broadcast every Sunday at 10:00 pm on TVN channel. The series finale aired on 27 November 2011.

On 27 October 2011, TVN cancelled Warsaw Pact after one season because of low ratings and little interest in the production.

== Plot ==
The series follows fortunes of Marek Oporny, a new policeman at the Criminal and Investigation Department in the Czerniaków police station. Marek has to get along with his new colleagues, the "criminal old stagers" - Kosa, Sikorek and his commissioner partner Zuza Szarek.

== Cast ==
- Lesław Żurek as Marek Oporny
- Jan Englert as Antoni Rylski "Łapa", Marek's uncle
- Olga Bołądź as Zuzanna Szarek
- Katarzyna Gniewkowska as Elżbieta Oporna, Marek's mother
- Katarzyna Herman as Ewelina Bargan
- Grażyna Szapołowska as Róża Jackowska
- Adam Ferency as Artur Kosecki "Kosa"
- Bartłomiej Topa as Zbigniew Sikorek
- Alan Andersz as Wojciech Maciejewski "Młody"
- Jerzy Jeszke as "Wilk"
