= Olga Bołądź =

Polish actress

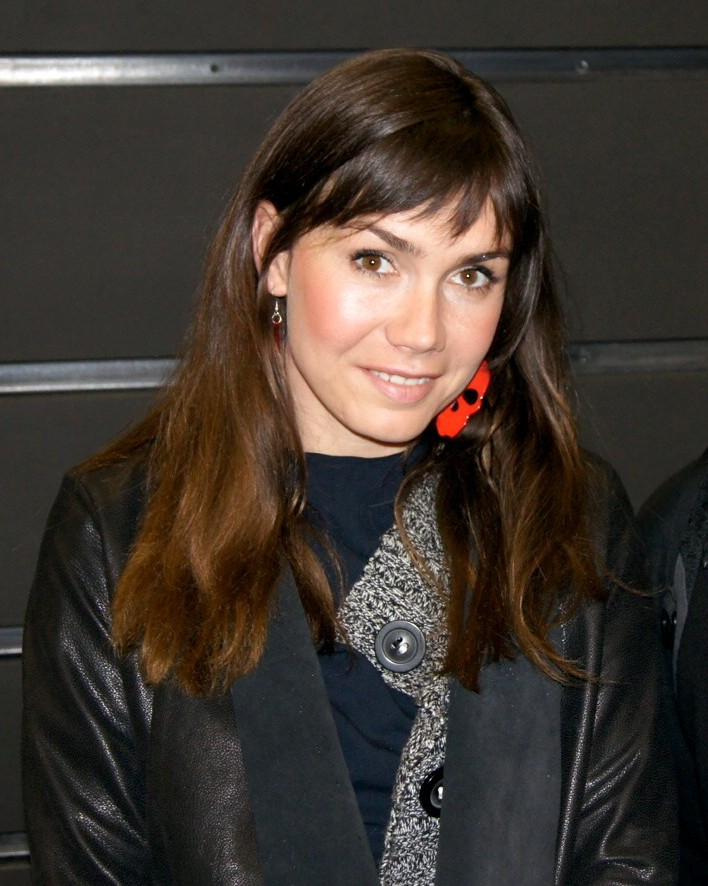
- Olga Bołądź in 2012
- Born: 29 February 1984 (age 42); Toruń, Poland
- Occupation: Actress
- Years active: 2006–present

Olga Maria Bołądź (born 29 February 1984) is a Polish actress. She has appeared in more than thirty films since 2006.

== Selected filmography ==
Film
Year	Title	Role	Notes
2013	The Girl from the Wardrobe	Aga	
2014	Secret Wars	Podporucznik Aleksandra Lach "Białko"	
2017	Botoks	Daniela	
2017	The Man with the Magic Box	Goria	
2017	The Last Suit	Gosia	
2018	Kobiety Mafii	Bela	
2024	Simona Kossak	Hanna Gucwinska	

Television
Year	Title	Role	Notes
2009	The Courageous Heart of Irena Sendler		
2011	Układ Warszawski	Zuzanna Szarek	
2018	Botoks	Daniela	
2018	Kobiety Mafii	Bela	
2018-22	The Defence	Magda	
