= List of Father Matthew episodes =

Father Matthew is a Polish television drama series, which has aired on TVP1 since November 11, 2008. It is a Polish version of the Italian detective series Don Matteo broadcast in Italy by Rai Uno.

== Series overview ==
Series	Title	Episodes	Originally released	
Series	Title	Episodes	First released	Last released
1	I	13	7 December 2008	22 February 2009
2	II	17	6 September 2009	27 December 2009
3	III	14	4 March 2010	3 June 2010
4	IV	12	9 September 2010	25 November 2010
5	V	13	3 March 2011	26 May 2011
6	VI	13	8 September 2011	2 December 2011
7	VII	13	8 March 2012	31 May 2012
8	VIII	13	6 September 2012	29 November 2012
9	IX	13	28 February 2013	23 May 2013
10	X	13	5 September 2013	28 November 2013
11	XI	13	6 March 2014	29 May 2014
12	XII	13	4 September 2014	27 November 2014
13	XIII	13	5 March 2015	28 May 2015
14	XIV	13	3 September 2015	26 November 2015
15	XV	13	3 March 2016	26 May 2016
16	XVI	13	1 September 2016	24 November 2016
17	XVII	13	2 March 2017	27 May 2017
18	XVIII	13	31 August 2017	23 November 2017
19	XIX	13	1 March 2018	24 May 2018
20	XX	13	6 September 2018	29 November 2018
21	XXI	13	28 February 2019	13 June 2019
22	XXII	13	12 September 2019	26 December 2019
23	XXIII	13	27 February 2020	10 September 2020
24	XXIV	13	17 September 2020	10 December 2020
25	XXV	13	4 March 2021	10 September 2021
26	XXVI	13	17 September 2021	17 December 2021
27	XXVII	13	4 March 2022	27 May 2022
28	XXVIII	13	9 September 2022	30 December 2022
29	XXIX	13	8 September 2023	21 September 2023
30	XXX	13	28 September 2023	11 April 2024
31	XXXI	13	18 April 2024	24 October 2024
32	XXXII	13	31 October 2024	17 April 2025
33	XXXIII	13	24 April 2025	30 October 2025
34	XXXIV	13	6 November 2025	23 April 2026
35	XXXV	13	30 April 2026	5 November 2026
36	XXXVI	13	12 November 2026	29 April 2027
37	XXXVII	13	7 May 2027	TBA

== Episodes ==
=== Season 1 (2008–2009) ===
No. overall	No. in season	Title	Guest actors	Original release date
1	1	"Obcy"	Marek Frąckowiak, Adam Bauman, Mariusz Ostrowski, Beata Deskur, Barbara Kurzaj	7 December 2008
2	2	"Eksperyment"	Andrzej Deskur, Adam Woronowicz, Barbara Kałużna, Leszek Piskorz, Barbara Babilińska, Anna Żytka	14 December 2008
3	3	"Dług"	Marek Włodarczyk, Robert Czebotar, Julita Kożuszek-Borsuk, Grzegorz Artman, Bartosz Dziedzic	21 December 2008
4	4	"Narkotyk"	Michał Filipiak, Stefan Popkowski, Hubert Zduniak	25 December 2008
5	5	"Róża"	Radosław Pazura, Monika Kwiatkowska-Dejczer, Wojciech Mecwaldowski, Grzegorz Małecki, Katarzyna Jamróz	28 December 2008
6	6	"Anna"	Katarzyna Kołeczek, Joanna Sienkiewicz, Marek Żerański, Georgi Angiełow, Tomasz Olejarczyk	4 January 2009
7	7	"Pomyłka"	Anna Milewska, Jacek Borkowski, Marek Siudym, Roman Kłosowski	11 January 2009
8	8	"Wyrok"	Ewa Bukowska, Henryk Gołębiewski, Krzysztof Janczar	18 January 2009
9	9	"Aktor"	Magdalena Różczka, Krzysztof Wakuliński, Jarosław Boberek, Patrycja Szczepanowska, Dariusz Kordek	25 January 2009
10	10	"Szantaż"	Magdalena Warzecha, Artur Dziurman, Olga Bołądź, Waldemar Czyszak, Agnieszka Kawiorska, Wojciech Machnicki	1 February 2009
11	11	"Zemsta"	Piotr Prokop, Jan Wieczorkowski, Elżbieta Romanowska, Jan Jankowski, Agnieszka Michalska, Lech Dyblik, Danuta Borsuk, Andrzej Szopa, Piotr Żurawski	8 February 2009
12	12	"Aniołek"	Mariusz Drężek, Katarzyna Ankudowicz, Lucyna Malec, Krzysztof Stelmaszyk, Lidia Bogaczówna, Zofia Czerwińska, Izabela Dąbrowska, Katarzyna Bargiełowska, Krzysztof Szekalski	15 February 2009
13	13	"Wypadek"	Grzegorz Warchoł, Piotr Skarga, Bohdan Łazuka, Juliusz Krzysztof Warunek, Małgorzata Rudzka	22 February 2009

=== Season 2 (2009) ===
No. overall	No. in season	Title	Guest actors	Original release date
14	1	"Powołanie"	Tadeusz Paradowicz, Marcin Kwaśny, Michał Rolnicki, Rafał Szałajko, Joanna Kurowska	6 September 2009
15	2	"Piętno"	Weronika Książkiewicz, Mariusz Kiljan, Marcin Czarnik, Tomasz Sobczak	13 September 2009
16	3	"Wycieczka"	Emilia Krakowska, Bogusław Kudłek, Zdzisław Wardejn, Edward Lubaszenko	20 September 2009
17	4	"Skarb"	Robert Rozmus, Władysław Kowalski, Janusz Chabior, Joanna Sienkiewicz	27 September 2009
18	5	"Jabłka"	Joanna Jeżewska, Witold Bieliński, Piotr Siejka, Włodzimierz Abramuszkin, Ewa Szawłowska	4 October 2009
19	6	"Osaczony"	Maria Niklińska, Joachim Lamża, Jarosław Boberek, Michał Czernecki	11 October 2009
20	7	"Ukąszenie węża"	Patrycja Soliman, Wiesław Niżyński, Tomasz Dedek	18 October 2009
21	8	"Koncert"	Laura Samojłowicz, Joanna Kulig, Sebastian Konrad, Aleksander Mikołajczak	25 October 2009
22	9	"Mag"	Magdalena Walach, Wenanty Nosul, Adam Dzienis, Jakub Przebindowski, Marcin Błaszak, Maciej Mikołajczyk	1 November 2009
23	10	"Poza grą"	Aleksandra Nieśpielak, Karolina Piechota, Bronisław Wrocławski, Marcin Troński, January Brunov, Piotr Nowak	8 November 2009
24	11	"Islamska żona"	Emilia Komarnicka, Adam Młynarczyk, Piotr Borowski, Ewa Szykulska, Sławomir Olszewski	11 November 2009
25	12	"Waga ciężka"	Andrzej Grabowski, Maciej Kozłowski, Robert Kuraś, Robert Ostolski, Bartłomiej Firlet	22 November 2009
26	13	"Łzy Ewy"	Dorota Landowska	29 November 2009
27	14	"Spowiedź"	Ewa Gorzelak, Marta Nieradkiewicz, Michał Żurawski, Sylwia Gliwa, Łukasz Konopka	6 December 2009
28	15	"Sekrety klasztoru"	Wiesław Komasa, Marcin Perchuć, Łukasz Garlicki, Beata Chruścińska, Jacek Kałucki, Marek Kasprzyk	13 December 2009
29	16	"Egzamin"	Natalia Rybicka, Lesław Żurek, Leon Charewicz, Marcin Rogacewicz, Andrzej Szczytko	20 December 2009
30	17	"Miłość Natalii"	Tomasz Karolak, Joanna Sydor, Monika Kwiatkowska-Dejczer, Marta Dąbrowska, Barbara Babilińska	27 December 2009

=== Season 3 (2010) ===
No. overall	No. in season	Title	Guest actors	Original release date
31	1	"Spa"	Beata Poźniak -Daniels, Maja Bohosiewicz, Jerzy Schejbal, Krystyna Podleska, Barbara Kurzaj	4 March 2010
32	2	"Pamięć"	Magdalena Kumorek, Małgorzata Socha, Ewa Telega, Arkadiusz Janiczek, Elżbieta Jarosik	11 March 2010
33	3	"Najpiękniejsza"	Bartłomiej Topa, Roksana Krzemińska, Natalia Walarowska	18 March 2010
34	4	"Skandal"	Katarzyna Herman, Jan Nowicki, Piotr Szwedes, Maciej Brzoska, Karolina Nolbrzak, Henryk Gołębiewski	25 March 2010
35	5	"Zakładnik"	Natalia Rzeźniak-Pospieszalska, Mariusz Zalejski, Izabela Dąbrowska, Maciej Makowski	1 April 2010
36	6	"Świadek"	Ireneusz Czop, Grzegorz Emanuel, Maja Hirsch, Łukasz Simlat	8 April 2010
37	7	"Zlecenie"	Olga Frycz, Dorota Kamińska, Jan Monczka, Dariusz Wnuk, Jarosław Budnik, Maciej Wilewski	22 April 2010
38	8	"Sprawa świętego Mikołaja"	Piotr Cyrwus, Paulina Chruściel, Wojciech Majchrzak, Bogusław Kaczmarczyk	29 April 2010
39	9	"Strach na scenie"	Beata Ścibakówna, Mariusz Pujszo, Anna Rusiecka	6 May 2010
40	10	"Wybory"	Jacek Rozenek, Aleksander Bednarz, Mateusz Grydlik	13 May 2010
41	11	"Zbrodnia w bibliotece"	Krzysztof Dutkiewicz, Justyna Grzybek, Joachim Lamża	20 May 2010
42	12	"Więzienna przeszłość"	Witold Oleksiak, Dariusz Biskupski, Agnieszka Wielgosz, Jan Jankowski	27 May 2010
43	13	"Konkurs tańca"	Beata Kawka, Klaudia Halejcio, Jacek Lenartowicz, Sambor Czarnota	29 May 2010
44	14	"Zatrute wino"	Andrzej Mastalerz, Andrzej Mrowiec, Magdalena Smalara	3 June 2010

=== Season 4 (2010) ===
No. overall	No. in season	Title	Guest actors	Original release date
45	1	"Cena prawdy"	Monika Kwiatkowska-Dejczer, Marek Kalita, Zdzisław Rychter, Halina Rasiakówna, Marta Alaborska, Piotr Grabowski	9 September 2010
46	2	"Skradziona miłość"	Matylda Baczyńska, Antoni Królikowski, Marek Bukowski, Michał Meyer, Hanna Polk	16 September 2010
47	3	"Tajemnicze śledztwo"	Joachim Lamża, Grzegorz Kowalczyk, Bartosz Żukowski, Marek Prażanowski	23 September 2010
48	4	"Śmierć na żywo"	Hanna Konarowska, Piotr Ligienza, Zbigniew Lesień	30 September 2010
49	5	"Lot"	Mikołaj Roznerski, Agnieszka Sienkiewicz, Joanna Kasperska, Mirosław Haniszewski, Sebastian Skoczeń	7 October 2010
50	6	"Sekrety i kłamstwa"	Dorota Deląg, Andrzej Zieliński, Andrzej Nejman, Dariusz Majchrzak	14 October 2010
51	7	"Talent"	Agata Kulesza, Piotr Skiba, Andrzej Grabarczyk, Katarzyna Pierścionek, Leszek Zduń, Wojciech Kalarus, Marcin Korcz	21 October 2010
52	8	"W kręgu podejrzeń"	Igor Michalski, Waldemar Błaszczyk, Bartłomiej Świderski, Zofia Czerwińska	28 October 2010
53	9	"Samotne serca"	Renata Dancewicz, Tomasz Kozłowicz, Kinga Ciesielska, Rafał Sisicki	4 November 2010
54	10	"Zaklęty rewir"	Katarzyna Romańczuk, Mariusz Wojciechowski, Andrzej Piszczatowski	11 November 2010
55	11	"Spływ"	Milena Suszyńska, Maja Barełkowska, Radosław Osypiuk, Jadwiga Gryn	18 November 2010
56	12	"Helena"	Mariusz Jakus, Anna Grycewicz, Agata Piotrowska-Mastalerz	25 November 2010

=== Season 5 (2011) ===
No. overall	No. in season	Title	Guest actors	Original release date
57	1	"Gwiazdeczka"	Anita Jancia, Małgorzata Rożniatowska, Dorota Bierkowska, Mateusz Banasiuk	3 March 2011
58	2	"Powódź"	Małgorzata Zajączkowska, Bartłomiej Krat, Marta Alaborska	10 March 2011
59	3	"Kryminał"	Dorota Segda, Piotr Pilitowski, Maciej Winkler	17 March 2011
60	4	"Urwisko"	Małgorzata Buczkowska, Jolanta Żółkowska, Jacek Bursztynowicz, Krzysztof Wieszczek	24 March 2011
61	5	"Krowy tłuste, krowy chude"	Grzegorz Gzyl, Agnieszka Grankowska, Mariusz Słupiński	31 March 2011
62	6	"Paragraf 23"	Anna Korcz, Michał Sitarski, Marta Dąbrowska	7 April 2011
63	7	"Zdobycz"	Julia Kijowska, Artur Łodyga, Maciej Kowalewski, Jarosław Boberek	14 April 2011
64	8	"Aukcja"	Anna Czartoryska, Sławomir Grzymkowski, Anna Gajewska, Roman Bugaj	21 April 2011
65	9	"Taka piękna niedziela"	Adam Ferency, Andrzej Andrzejewski, Elżbieta Panas, Agnieszka Żulewska	28 April 2011
66	10	"Obrona konieczna"	Mariusz Bonaszewski, Monika Buchowiec, Martyna Kliszewska	5 May 2011
67	11	"Sonata"	Aneta Todorczuk-Perchuć, Halina Rowicka, Magdalena Smalara, Antoni Pawlicki, Włodzimierz Adamski	12 May 2011
68	12	"Rabunek"	Krzysztof Kiersznowski, Agnieszka Paszkowska, Paweł Szczesny	19 May 2011
69	13	"Ogrodnik"	Agnieszka Mandat, Andrzej Niemyt, Andrzej Brzeski, Dariusz Siastacz	26 May 2011

=== Season 6 (2011) ===
No. overall	No. in season	Title	Guest actors	Original release date
70	1	"Eden"	Aldona Orman, Stanisław Penksyk, Rafał Zawierucha, Mariusz Krzemiński	8 September 2011
71	2	"Powrót Piotra"	Wiktoria Gorodecka, Eugeniusz Malinowski, Ilja Zmiejew	15 September 2011
72	3	"Fatum"	Marcin Jędrzejewski, Elżbieta Jędrzejewska, Jakub Wieczorek, Małgorzata Sadowska	22 September 2011
73	4	"Zatruta woda"	Przemysław Bluszcz, Marek Richter, Piotr Trojan, Beata Chruścińska, Tomasz Borkowski	29 September 2011
74	5	"Druga szansa"	Mirosław Krawczyk, Piotr Jankowski, Ireneusz Dydliński, Małgorzata Potocka, Katarzyna Kołeczek	6 October 2011
75	6	"Zanik pamięci"	Sylwia Juszczak, Beata Schimscheiner, Karol Stępkowski, Maciej Gąsiorek	13 October 2011
76	7	"Jacek"	Magdalena Lamparska, Andrzej Krucz, Alan Andersz	20 October 2011
77	8	"Kolekcjoner"	Krzysztof Janczar, Andrzej Precigs, Andrzej Oksza-Łapicki, Anna Łopatowska	27 October 2011
78	9	"Wyjazd"	Wojciech Błach, Marta Chodorowska, Przemysław Wyszyński, Magdalena Waligórska, Wojciech Bilip	3 November 2011
79	10	"Rodzinne więzi"	Edyta Herbuś, Natalia Lesz, Tomasz Ciachorowski, Mariusz Zaniewski, Marian Opania, Roman Bugaj	10 November 2011
80	11	"Adrenalina"	Natalia Rybicka, Mikołaj Roznerski, Bartosz Obuchowicz, Andrzej Szczytko, Ksawery Szlenkier	17 November 2011
81	12	"Przerwany weekend"	Anna Prus, Daria Widawska, Adam Cywka, Antoni Królikowski, Paweł Orleański	24 November 2011
82	13	"Zaginiony"	Maria Gładkowska, Dagmara Krasowska, Kazimierz Mazur, Roman Bugaj	1 December 2011

=== Season 7 (2012) ===
No. overall	No. in season	Title	Guest actors	Original release date
83	1	"Zastępstwo"	Katarzyna Ankudowicz, Marcel Wiercichowski, Marek Ślosarski	8 March 2012
84	2	"Rocznica"	Maciej Wilewski, Mariusz Drężek, Sławomir Zapała, Zbigniew Borek	15 March 2012
85	3	"Naciągacze"	Rafał Fudalej, Mateusz Mikołajczyk, Sebastian Skoczeń, Wojciech Skibiński	22 March 2012
86	4	"Haracz"	Helena Sujecka, Artur Dziurman, Małgorzata Puzio-Miękus, Robert Wrzosek	29 March 2012
87	5	"Pożyczka"	Joanna Gryga, Anna Piróg-Karaszkiewicz, Ewa Borowik, Krzysztof Bień, Wojciech Machnicki, Danuta Borsuk, Piotr Grabowski	5 April 2012
88	6	"Czekolada"	Sonia Bohosiewicz, Piotr Borowski, Halina Bednarz, Paweł Burczyk, Remigiusz Jankowski, Henryk Gołębiewski	12 April 2012
89	7	"Śpiewak"	Krzysztof Stelmaszyk, Agnieszka Wosińska, Karolina Nolbrzak, Mateusz Janicki	19 April 2012
90	8	"Zabawa"	Marta Chyczewska, Katarzyna Żak, Magdalena Smalara, Marta Alaborska, Katarzyna Bargiełowska	26 April 2012
91	9	"Tango"	Natalia Lesz, Maria Niklińska, Piotr Pręgowski, Marcin Janos Krawczyk, Żora Korolyov	3 May 2012
92	10	"Małolata"	Olga Kalicka, Monika Krzywkowska, Tadeusz Chudecki, Monika Świtaj	10 May 2012
93	11	"Wróżby"	Anna Gornostaj, Monika Stefaniak, Dariusz Kordek, Dariusz Toczek, Barbara Kurzaj	17 May 2012
94	12	"Przytułek"	Magdalena Czerwińska, Małgorzata Rożniatowska, Tomasz Sapryk, Jakub Kornacki	24 May 2012
95	13	"Ikona"	Artur Janusiak, Jerzy Połoński, Andrzej Zaborski, Jan Janga-Tomaszewski, Andrzej Blumenfeld, Dorota Bierkowska, Piotr Półtorak, Bernard Bania, Wojciech Stachura, Jan Krzysztof Szczygieł, Franciszek Utko, Aurelia Sobczak, Ewa Kozłowska, Ryszard Doliński, Paweł Szymański, Tomasz Lipski	31 May 2012

=== Season 8 (2012) ===
No. overall	No. in season	Title	Guest actors	Original release date
96	1	"Wybory serca"	Marta Honzatko, Grzegorz Damięcki, Adam Nowojczyk, Ewa Wencel, Ewa Złotowska, Dariusz Wnuk	6 September 2012
97	2	"Bieg"	Artur Janusiak, Jerzy Połoński, Janusz Chabior, Krzysztof Wach, Andrzej Niemirski, Krzysztof Mateusiak, Michał Chorosiński, Aleksander Mikołajczak	13 September 2012
98	3	"Święta Rodzina"	Artur Janusiak, Jerzy Połoński, Wojciech Brzeziński, Piotr Żukowski, Aleksander Maliszewski, Grzegorz Warchoł, Danuta Sacharczuk-Bach, Jowita Miondlikowska, Grażyna Zielińska, Aleksandra Justa, Joanna Kwiatkowska-Zduń, Krzysztof Pilat	20 September 2012
99	4	"Trująca orchidea"	Aleksandra Nieśpielak, Łukasz Nowicki, Maria Góralczyk, Anna Smołowik, Ewa Ampulska	27 September 2012
100	5	"Sklep z zabawkami"	Marcin Rogacewicz, Piotr Rękawik, Marta Ścisłowicz, Michał Lesień, Paweł Koślik	4 October 2012
101	6	"Tajemnica cmentarza"	Jacek Radziński, Elżbieta Czerwińska, Stanisław Penksyk, Zacharjasz Muszyński	11 October 2012
102	7	"Pani sierżant"	Waldemar Barwiński, Magdalena Nieć, Andrzej Deskur, Patrycja Soliman, Joanna Zalewska	18 October 2012
103	8	"Fatalna diagnoza"	Tadeusz Borowski, Mariusz Ostrowski, Krzysztof Czeczot, Mariusz Słupiński, Miłogost Reczek, Tomasz Radawiec, Ireneusz Machnicki, Jacek Kałucki	25 October 2012
104	9	"Komediant"	Weronika Książkiewicz, Kamil Mróz, Ireneusz Czop, Piotr Tołoczko, Norbert Kaczorowski	1 November 2012
105	10	"Artykuł"	Roch Siemianowski, Paweł Góralski, Grzegorz Małecki, Michał Anioł, Waldemar Czyszak	8 November 2012
106	11	"Sztuka dojrzewania"	Aleksandra Kusio, Ryszard Starosta, Maciej Kulig, Zina Kerste, Piotr Gawron-Jedlikowski	15 November 2012
107	12	"Czarna wdowa"	Weronika Rosati, Dominika Gwit, Marek Siudym, Renata Kretówna, Stanisław Pąk	22 November 2012
108	13	"Obrączka"	Krzysztof Dracz, Aleksandra Hamkało, Grażyna Laszczyk, Paweł Marczuk, Paula Bąk, Joanna Orleańska	29 November 2012

=== Season 9 (2013) ===
No. overall	No. in season	Title	Guest actors	Original release date
109	1	"Ucieczka"	Ada Fijał, Piotr Siwkiewicz, Michał Mikołajczak, Mateusz Grydlik	28 February 2013
110	2	"Sprawa honoru"	Robert Gonera, Magdalena Wójcik, Bożena Stachura, Kamil Kula, Witold Wieliński	7 March 2013
111	3	"Festyn"	Łukasz Garlicki, Wojciech Duryasz, Marzena Trybała, Hubert Jarczak, Czesław Majewski	14 March 2013
112	4	"Powrót po latach"	Olgierd Łukaszewicz, Lech Mackiewicz, Grzegorz Wons, Justyna Grzybek, Wojciech Urbański, Anna Korzeniecka	21 March 2013
113	5	"Z miłości"	Izabela Kuna, Roman Gancarczyk, Jacek Bursztynowicz, Jakub Grzegorek, Orina Krajewska, Magdalena Kizinkiewicz, Kazimierz Nowak, Andrzej Baranowski	28 March 2013
114	6	"Zbrodnia na pierwszą stronę"	Wojciech Solarz, Bartłomiej Chowaniec, Jan Aleksandrowicz-Krasko, Paweł Ferens, Grzegorz Stelmaszewski, Janusz Onufrowicz, Łukasz Choroń	4 April 2013
115	7	"Daleki krewny"	Waldemar Obłoza, Monika Pikuła, Igor Obłoza, Mateusz Gąsiewski, Bartłomiej Myca, Hanna Kochańska	11 April 2013
116	8	"Pluskwa"	Bartosz Dziedzic, Bartosz Gelner, Krystian Biłko, Mirosław Bieliński, Aleksandra Wojtysiak	18 April 2013
117	9	"Muzycy"	25 April 2013	
118	10	"Znikająca asystentka"	Elżbieta Romanowska, Przemysław Sadowski, Karolina Gorczyca, Jarosław Gajewski, Michał Sitarski, Justyna Kapuścińska	2 May 2013
119	11	"Laweciarze"	Marcin Przybylski, Filip Bobek, Paweł Królikowski, Jerzy Łapiński, Lech Dyblik, Remigiusz Jankowski, Tomasz Jarosz, Mikołaj Osiński, Zbigniew Kozłowski, Magdalena Górska, Cezary Poks, Jan Wojtyński	9 May 2013
120	12	"Niebezpieczne związki"	Agnieszka Wagner, Zofia Zborowska, Bogusław Kudłek, Robert Koszucki, Marian Krawczyk, Jarosław Dziedzic	16 May 2013
121	13	"Na złej drodze"	Redbad Klynstra, Ewa Tucholska, Filip Garbacz, Damian Bereda, Szymon Nygard, Konrad Łaszewski, Kamil Grenda, Wojciech Walasik, Agata Piotrowska-Mastalerz, Robert Błoński, Barbara Osóbka	23 May 2013

=== Season 10 (2013) ===
No. overall	No. in season	Title	Guest actors	Original release date
122	1	"Wybuch"	Marcin Tyrol, Piotr Zelt, Szymon Nowak, Magdalena Kajrowicz, Piotr Pamuła, Paweł Szczesny, Agnieszka Wielgosz, Ryszard Abraham, Jacek Pluta, Magdalena Emilianowicz	5 September 2013
123	2	"Napad"	Anna Cieślak, Marcin Bosak, Katarzyna Kwiatkowska, Gabriela Raczyńska, Kalina Hlimi-Pawlukiewicz, Piotr Łukaszczyk	12 September 2013
124	3	"Rezydencja"	Zdzisław Wardejn, Agnieszka Warchulska, Olga Gontarczuk, Norbert Rakowski, Maciej Jachowski, Leszek Zduń, Monika Ordowska	19 September 2013
125	4	"Zielony zakątek"	Anna Korzeniecka, Ryszard Ronczewski, Andrzej Konopka, Tadeusz Pluciński, Michał Gadomski, Karolina Nowakowska, Daria Woronowicz, Artur Chamski, Bartosz Głogowski, Zofia Idzikowska, Iwona Rejzner, Małgorzata Prażmowska, Konrad Rydlewski, Aleksander Zelenay-Grabny, Łukasz Szczepanik	26 September 2013
126	5	"Słowo faceta"	Jan Rotowski, Marcin Walewski, Wojciech Starostecki, Karina Kunkiewicz, Marek Włodarczyk, Ilona Kucińska, Magdalena Kajrowicz, Jan Kochanowski, Daniel Szczypa, Karolina Muszalak, Cezary Poks, Krzysztof Swend	3 October 2013
127	6	"Dzień papieski"	Marek Kalita, Dawid Pokusa, Mirosław Zbrojewicz, Artur Dziurman, Piotr Furman, Konstanty Kowalewski, Cezary Poks, Teresa Gałczyńska, Ignacy Sut, Filip Turkiewicz	10 October 2013
128	7	"Celebryta"	Grażyna Błęcka-Kolska, Robert Czebotar, Mirosław Guzowski, Mateusz Król	17 October 2013
129	8	"Układ"	Jakub Wróblewski, Leszek Lichota, Paulina Chruściel, Tomasz Sobczak, Gizella Bortel, Jacek Radziński, Jarosław Boberek, Michał Cyndler, Ireneusz Kozioł, Jacek Dzięgiel	24 October 2013
130	9	"Zakładniczka"	Michał Podsiadło, Adrian Brząkała, Maria Maj, Dagmara Bąk, Aleksander Mikołajczak, Beata Chruścińska, Joachim Lamża, Bartosz Martyna, Kamil Dominiak	31 October 2013
131	10	"Doskonała"	Iga Górecka, Anna Jażdżyk, Robert Jarociński, Paweł Dobek, Monika Mazur, Piotr Szwedes, Andrzej Chudy, Renata Pękul, Marta Ormaniec, Kinga Ilgner, Andżelika Piechowiak	7 November 2013
132	11	"Radar"	Justyna Sieńczyłło, Andrzej Popiel, Ilona Korycka, Aleksander Trąbczyński, Maciej Kulig, Agnieszka Skup, Mieszko Barglik, Jarosław Witaszczyk	14 November 2013
133	12	"Kolekcjoner"	Sandra Staniszewska, Ewa Błaszczyk, Marek Lewandowski, Aleksander Sosiński, Robert Mika, Paweł Krucz, Olha Bosova, Philippe Tłokiński, Katarzyna Pierścionek	21 November 2013
134	13	"Ślepy los"	Eryk Kulm, Maciej Marczewski, Marianna Januszewicz, Dariusz Siastacz, Zbigniew Suszyński, Katarzyna Ucherska, Paweł Paczesny, Agnieszka Czekańska, Aleksandra Godlewska, Wojciech Rotowski	28 November 2013

=== Season 11 (2014) ===
No. overall	No. in season	Title	Guest actors	Original release date
135	1	"Zagadki serca"	Julia Pietrucha, Paweł Deląg, Mikołaj Krawczyk, Marieta Żukowska, Piotr Ligienza, Adam Dzienis, Krzysztof Wach, Wenanty Nosul	6 March 2014
136	2	"Siostrzeniec"	Dorota Chotecka, Edyta Olszówka, Krzysztof Czapliński, Radosław Pazura, Dominik Bąk, Piotr Kondrat, Zbigniew Kaleta, Ireneusz Kozioł	13 March 2014
137	3	"Tajemnica Możejki"	Krystyna Tkacz, Justyna Wasilewska, Grażyna Marzec, Piotr Nowak, Tomasz Błasiak, Anna Ilczuk, Paweł Tomaszewski, Kamil Przystał, Tomasz Mandes	20 March 2014
138	4	"Trefny towar"	Jan Raubo, Jakub Mazurek, Maciej Brzoska, Wojciech Molski, Roman Bugaj, Kamil Miondlikowski, Jakub Świderski, Stanisław Jaskułka, Jarosław Boberek, Piotr Makarski, Bartosz Kopeć	27 March 2014
139	5	"Wyścig z czasem"	Katarzyna Węglicka, Marek Kasprzyk, Szymon Rząca, Amin Bensalem, Paweł Iwanicki, Mateusz Grydlik	3 April 2014
140	6	"Zagubiona"	Matylda Iwańska, Maria Szafirska, Adam Nawojczyk, Alina Kamińska, Julian Chwalewski, Waldemar Błaszczyk, Jolanta Mrotek, Mirosław Jękot, Ewa Bakalarska	10 April 2014
141	7	"Wypadek"	Zbigniew Zamachowski, Piotr Głowacki, Agnieszka Suchora, Stanisław Brudny, Elżbieta Jarosik, Anna Grycewicz	17 April 2014
142	8	"Cudowne dziecko"	Joanna Orleańska, Cezary Kosiński, Aleksander Maliszewski, Małgorzata Buczkowska, Dorota Gorjainow, Maciej Kubica, Wojciech Walasik, Edyta Olszówka, Grażyna Strachota	24 April 2014
143	9	"Gorące rytmy"	Marta Juras, Dorota Czaja, Katarzyna Priwieziencew, Kamil Czarnecki, Magdalena Kuta	1 May 2014
144	10	"Poker"	Olga Serebryakova, Laura Łącz, Michał Żurawski, Maciej Szary, Leon Charewicz, Aleksandra Justa, Cezary Poks, Andrea Possenti	15 May 2014
145	11	"Kurtka"	Cezary Pazura, Dorota Naruszewicz, Sławomir Grzymkowski, Maria Dębska, Vanessa Aleksander, Marcin Piętowski, Katarzyna Kołeczek	22 May 2014
146	12	"Wesele"	Kazimierz Mazur, Magdalena Różańska, Rafał Zawierucha, Zbigniew Stryj, Dawid Zawadzki, Aleksandra Konieczna, Magdalena Emilianowicz	29 May 2014
147	13	"Oskarżony"	Joanna Moro, Adam Woronowicz, Monika Krzywkowska, Marta Mazurek, Nikodem Rozbicki, Marcin Kwaśny	5 June 2014

=== Season 12 (2014) ===
No. overall	No. in season	Title	Guest actors	Original release date
148	1	"Ślady przeszłości"	Bartłomiej Kasprzykowski, Andrzej Pieczyński, Anna Smołowik, Wojciech Brzeziński, Izabela Dąbrowska	4 September 2014
149	2	"Magiczne zwierciadło"	Marta Żmuda Trzebiatowska, Bartosz Porczyk, Magdalena Pociecha, Kamil Szeptycki	11 September 2014
150	3	"Powrót"	Danuta Stenka, Adrian Zaremba, Grzegorz Kwiecień, Kamila Klimczak, Jacek Mikołajczak, Maja Barełkowska, Adam Szyszkowski	18 September 2014
151	4	"Zakochany Marczak"	Rafał Maćkowiak, Michał Napiątek, Anna Wojnarowska, Grzegorz Goch, Peter J. Lucas, Joanna Jeżewska, Radomir Rospondek, Agnieszka Sienkiewicz	25 September 2014
152	5	"Niania"	Katarzyna Zawadzka, Władysław Kowalski, Marek Probosz, Agnieszka Kawiorska, Michał Lesień, Jarosław Boberek, Natalia Iwańska, Wojciech Rotowski	2 October 2014
153	6	"Na zakręcie"	Ewa Audykowska, Piotr Warszawski, Urszula Gryczewska, Arkadiusz Głogowski, Andrzej Konopka, Krzysztof Kluzik, Edyta Olszówka	9 October 2014
154	7	"Disco"	Angelika Kurowska, Karolina Głąb, Klementyna Szymańska, Filip Pławiak, Bartosz Obuchowicz, Sylwia Wysocka, Malwina Wasilewska, Rafał Kosiński, Tomasz Solich, Mateusz Dobies, Sebastian Stankiewicz	16 October 2014
155	8	"Żart"	Bartosz Żukowski, Adam Zdrójkowski, Katarzyna Herman, Marcin Walewski, Jasper Sołtysiewicz, Agnieszka Grankowska, Grzegorz Gadziomski, Arkadiusz Detmer, Wojciech Majchrzak	23 October 2014
156	9	"Suknia"	Marta Dobecka, Ewa Bakalarska, Tomasz Dedek, Kinga Suchan, Joanna Opozda, Andrzej Młynarczyk, Mariusz Ostrowski, Konrad Bugaj	30 October 2014
157	10	"Medalion"	Maria Pakulnis, Grzegorz Małecki, Marek Nędza, Krzysztof Dutkiewicz, Andrzej Wichrowski, Elżbieta Gaertner, Magdalena Woleńska	6 November 2014
158	11	"Demony"	Maria Pawłowska, Ewa Żukowska, Włodzimierz Adamski, Ewa Serwa, Daniel Misiewicz, Rafał Olbrychski, Artur Gotz, Jacek Czyż, Joanna Sienkiewicz, Ewelina Łyszczek	13 November 2014
159	12	"Złoty interes"	Anna Tomaszewska, Joanna Kurowska, Jerzy Klonowski, Renata Pękul, Nam Bui Ngoc, Piotr Siejka	20 November 2014
160	13	"Jama"	Agata Meilut, Łukasz Konopka, Magdalena Łoś, Anita Jancia, Ludmiła Witkowska	27 November 2014

=== Season 13 (2015) ===
No. overall	No. in season	Title	Guest actors	Original release date
161	1	"Insulina"	Stefan Friedmann, Grzegorz Warchoł, Marek Frąckowiak, Włodzimierz Matuszak, Dominika Janik, Mariusz Witkowski, Bartosz Adamczyk, Nikodem Kasprowicz, Joanna Gleń, Ewa Złotowska	5 March 2015
162	2	"Przed ślubem"	Magdalena Lamparska, Magdalena Turczeniewicz, Małgorzata Klara, Marcin Rogacewicz, Marcin Błaszak, Dorota Kamińska, Adriana Kalska, Arkadiusz Janiczek	19 March 2015
163	3	"Osaczenie"	Aleks Wieczorek, Jan Cięciara, Mateusz Grydlik, Katarzyna Galica, Gabriela Oberbek, Szymon Roszak, Sebastian Stankiewicz, Hanna Kochańska, Dariusz Siastac	26 March 2015
164	4	"Miłość po grób"	Bartosz Waga, Agnieszka Czekańska, Magdalena Czerwińska, Joanna Sydor, Aleksandra Radwan, Monika Krzywkowska, Olga Omeljaniec, Tomasz Oświeciński	2 April 2015
165	5	"Piotruś Pan"	Damian Ul, Bernadetta Dzierżanowska, Maciej Pośnik, Adam Cywka, Tomasz Borkowski, Karina Seweryn, Maria Konarowska, Krystyna Rutkowska-Ulewicz	9 April 2015
166	6	"Pogubieni"	Sylwia Juszczak, Tomasz Włosok, Olga Kalicka, Wojciech Skibiński, Robert Ostolski, January Brunov, Henryk Gołębiewski, Bartosz Woźny	16 April 2015
167	7	"Diabelski śmiech"	23 April 2015	
168	8	"Reportaż z domu"	Michał Włodarczyk, Weronika Humaj, Dominik Bąk, Mikołaj Osiński, Piotr Trojan, Robert Wabich	30 April 2015
169	9	"Portret psychologiczny"	Maja Hirsch, Tomasz Bednarek, Krzysztof Chodorowski, Natalia Zielska, Maciej Mikołajczyk, Lena Frankiewicz	7 May 2015
170	10	"Stan zagrożenia"	Andrzej Mastelarz, Mieszko Barglik	14 May 2015
171	11	"Cień podejrzeń"	Julia Konarska, Aleksandra Popławska, Jolanta Fraszyńska, Witold Dębicki, Rafał Mohr, Jakub Wieczorek	28 May 2015
172	12	"Złoty saganek"	Dariusz Wiktorowicz, Hubert Urbański, Lech Dyblik, Natalia Klimas, Maciej Skuratowicz, Dariusz Wieteska, Robert Koszucki, Maciej Makowski, Rafał Szałajko	4 June 2015
173	13	"Ostatnie dni"	Agnieszka Wagner, Zuzanna Grabowska, Cezary Morawski, Cezary Poks, Agata Piotrowska-Mastalerz, Katarzyna Bargiełowska, Michał Czernecki, Grzegorz Skrzecz	11 June 2015

=== Season 14 (2015) ===
No. overall	No. in season	Title	Guest actors	Original release date
174	1	"Panaceum"	Magdalena Boczarska, Wojciech Błach, Łukasz Matecki, Rafał Królikowski	3 September 2015
175	2	"Drift"	Piotr Stramowski, Jacek Lenartowicz, Mateusz Banasiuk, Grzegorz Stosz	10 September 2015
176	3	"Świadek oskarżenia"	Marian Opania, Jacek Kopczyński, Aleksandra Mikołajczyk, Lili Dąbrowska, Tomasz Mandes	17 September 2015
177	4	"Amfetamina"	Leszek Zduń, Marcin Gruszka, Kacper Krasuski, Jan Łajewski, Monika Radziwon, Wojciech Dmochowski	24 September 2015
178	5	"Poza światem"	Wojciech Mecwaldowski, Dominika Kluźniak, Julia Gawrysiak, Karolina Piechota, Anna Kerth	1 October 2015
179	6	"Geniusz"	Andżelika Piechowiak, Joanna Drozda, Jakub Stoiński, Konrad Szymański	8 October 2015
180	7	"Życiowy rekord"	Agnieszka Michalska, Anna Smołowik, Zbigniew Dziduch, Magdalena Żak, Patryk Cebulski	15 October 2015
181	8	"Piekło"	Arkadiusz Nader, Piotr Rzymyszkiewicz, Ada Cyndler, Izolda Wojciechowska	22 October 2015
182	9	"Krew z krwi"	Monika Kwiatkowska, Dorota Landowska, Ireneusz Machnicki, Wojciech Billip, Jakub Przebindowski, Szymon Malczewski, Jasper Sołtysiewicz	29 October 2015
183	10	"Siłownia"	Angelika Kurowska, Łukasz Stawowczyk, Maciej Radel, Karol Górski, Piotr Mróz, Krzysztof Chromiński, Mateusz Młodzianowski, Miłosz Karbownik, Agnieszka Mrozińska-Jaszczuk, Aleksandra Posielężna	5 November 2015
184	11	"Sekretny układ"	Piotr Cyrwus, Adam Fidusiewicz, Marta Klubowicz, Marta Król, Agnieszka Więdłocha, Maciej Małysa	12 November 2015
185	12	"Rave Party"	Sergiusz Żymełka, Bartosz Obuchowicz, Fabian Kocięcki, Adam Serowaniec, Wojciech Paszkowski, Ewa Szykulska, Magdalena Żak	19 November 2015
186	13	"Złomiarze"	Stanisław Sygitowicz, Jerzy Rogalski, Piotr Domalewski, Mariusz Saniternik, Mariusz Czajka, Kinga Kosik	26 November 2015

=== Season 15 (2016) ===
No. overall	No. in season	Title	Guest actors	Original release date
187	1	"Uciekinier"	Redbad Klijnstra, Sławomir Grzymek, Piotr Łukawski, Tomasz Piątkowski, Dariusz Wieteska, Maciej Kubica	3 March 2016
188	2	"Przeznaczenie"	Olga Bończyk, Dariusz Kordek, Jarosław Dziedzic, Olga Frycz, Aleksander Machalica, Jerzy Łapiński, Emilia Korsak, Maria Broniewska	10 March 2016
189	3	"Przemiana"	Jerzy Bończak, Milena Suszyńska, Rafał Kosiński, Jakub Ulewicz, Agnieszka Wielgosz, Dariusz Karpiński, Sławomir Gwizdak, Patrycja Szczepanowska	17 March 2016
190	4	"Weryfikacja"	Szymon Rząca, Zbigniew Suszyński, Joanna Derengowska, Paweł Iwanicki, Mariusz Jakus, Bartłomiej Jabłoński, Mieszko Barglik, Jakub Kotyński, Anna Falińska	24 March 2016
191	5	"Upadek"	Aleksandra Domańska, Andrzej Deskur, Halina Skoczyńska, Marek Siudym, Szymon Rząca, Mieszko Barglik, Marzena Gryzińska, Tomasz Łukaszek	31 March 2016
192	6	"Matczyne serce"	Maja Agnieszka Andrzejczuk, Eryk Kulm, Kacper Matula, Maciej Wilewski, Diana Kadłubowska, Barbara Kurzaj, Cezary Poks, Daria Brudnias, Agata Załecka	7 April 2016
193	7	"Komornicy"	Dariusz Toczek, Paulina Gałązka, Ewa Telega, Mirosław Kropielnicki, Rafał Kwietniewski, Jolanta Juszkiewicz, Filip Jacak, Sławomir Holland, Gizela Bortel, Natalia Skrzypek, Maria Broniewska	14 April 2016
194	8	"Pałac"	Sambor Czarnota, Monika Pikuła, Joanna Smolińska, Katarzyna Solińska, Jerzy Schejbal, Rafał Zawierucha, Marek Kasprzyk, Marcin Gaweł	21 April 2016
195	9	"Medium"	Lucyna Malec, Monika Mariotti, Kamilla Baar-Kochańska, Radoslaw Krzyżowski, Honorata Witańska, Pascal Kaczorowski, Maria Gortych, Michał Ochocki, Anna Janik, Katarzyna Lisowska, Natalia Kałbania	28 April 2016
196	10	"O mały włos"	Sylwia Gliwa, Michał Barczak, Anna Maria Jarosik, Katarzyna Łaniewska, Mariusz Zalejski, Paweł Hajnos, Małgorzata Lipka	5 May 2016
197	11	"Bransoletka"	Jolanta Mielech, Sławomir Fedorowicz, Piotr Pilitowski, Wiktoria Wolańska, Przemysław Furdak, Dariusz Bronowicki, Ewa Szawłowska, Stanisław Banasiuk, Beata Olga Kowalska, Danuta Borsuk, Tomasz Krzyżanowski	19 May 2016
198	12	"Psina"	Wojciech Michalak, Artur Krajewski, Grzegorz Kulikowski, Szymon Sędrowski, Amelia Radecka, Bartłomiej Krat, Przemysław Modliszewski, Grzegorz Kucias, Aleksander Milicevic	26 May 2016
199	13	"Manuela"	Zuzanna Pawlak, Piotr Grabowski, Józef Pawłowski, Mariusz Pilawski, Lena Schimscheiner, Acilyz Katell Caro, Carlos Granda, Ivan Marin Rodriguez, Armando Alvarado, Beata Reykan, Krzysztof Stawowy, Maria Ciesielska	2 June 2016

=== Season 16 (2016) ===
No. overall	No. in season	Title	Guest actors	Original release date
200	1	"Idol"	Paweł Stasiak, Piotr Gąsowski, Robert Rozmus, Anna Moskal, Łukasz Nowicki, Rafał Olbrychski, Marlena Durda	1 September 2016
201	2	"Myszka Miki"	Jan Marczewski, Aleksandra Skoneczna, Tomasz Schimscheiner, Krzysztof Wach, Marcel Borowiec, Tomasz Skrzypniak, Jacek Grondowy, Piotr Gawron-Jedlikowski	8 September 2016
202	3	"Lotnisko"	Piotr Trojan, Paweł Okoński, Maciej Mikołajczyk, Igor Michalski, Anna Gorajska, Sebastian Cybulski, Sylwia Wysocka, Anna Przygoda, Krzysztof Sztabiński, Michał Cyndler, Bartosz Pytka, Piotr Duliński	15 September 2016
203	4	"Antyk"	Katarzyna Jamróz, Olgierd Łukaszewicz, Izabella Bukowska, Artur Kocięcki, Hanna Rogowska, Marta Gortych, Marlena Durda, Beata Cybula, Sławomir Głazek, Piotr Łukawski	22 September 2016
204	5	"Kometa"	Marta Ścisłowicz, Edwin Petrykat, Piotr Ligienza, Krzysztof Kwiatkowski, Karolina Stefańska, January Brunov, Eugenia Herman, Edward Linde-Lubaszenko, Czesław Bogdański, Michał Cyndler, Jakub Grzegorek, Mirosław Rzońca	29 September 2016
205	6	"Gang"	Delfina Wilkonska, Teresa Sawicka, Maria Maj, Grażyna Marzec, Tomasz Kozłowicz, Bernard Kierat, Wojciech Michalak, Maria Broniewska, Alicja Borkowska-Ciok, Krzysztof Artur Janczar, Karina Węgiełek, Michał Cyndler, Grzegorz Świtalski, Krystyna Rutkowska-Ulewicz, Krzysztof Podemski	6 October 2016
206	7	"Konferencja"	Małgorzata Pieczyńska, Lesław Żurek, Katarzyna Gniewkowska, Magdalena Schejbal, Roma Gąsiorowska, Katarzyna Kołeczek, Dariusz Wnuk, Tomasz Domagała, Katarzyna Wąsik	13 October 2016
207	8	"Dębowa Górka"	Antoni Pawlicki, Katarzyna Warnke, Szymon Mysłakowski, Mateusz Młodzianowski, Maciej Jachowski, Krzysztof Mateusiak, Artur Łodyga, Zbigniew Kozłowski, Grzegorz Jurek, Adrian Budakow, Sylwia Rybacka	20 October 2016
208	9	"Porzeczki"	Dominik Mirecki, Sebastian Perdek, Sylwester Maciejewski, Gracja Niedżwedź, Elżbieta Romanowska, Robert Wabich, Grażyna Kopeć, Sławomir Holland, Małgorzata Maślanka, Beata Chruścińska, Bartosz Kopeć, Michał Cyndler, Tomasz Domagała	27 October 2016
209	10	"Nauczyciel"	Dawid Zawadzki, Dominika Figurska, Michał Czachor, Robert Latusek, Halina Bednarz, Ewa Wencel, Grzegorz Wons, Andrzej Musiał, Natalia Zalewska, Marcelina Szozda	3 November 2016
210	11	"Reggae"	Krzysztof Piątkowski, Jan Wieczorkowski, Joanna Kupińska, Igor Kujawski, Karolina Rosińska, Helena Chorzelska, Barbara Szcześniak-Kłosowska, Iwo Rajski, Daniel Kazimierski, Alaksandra Radzka, Magdalena Aly Amer	10 November 2016
211	12	"Napad doskonały"	Tomasz Sapryk, Tomasz Radawiec, Jacek Pluta, Krzysztof Pyziak, Bartłomiej Chowaniec, Ewa Lorska, Ewa Drzymała, Jarosław Gruda, Ewa Oksza-Łapicka, Sławomir Holland, Robert Płuszka, Dariusz Dobkowski, Maciej Winkler	17 November 2016
212	13	"Wahadełko"	Joanna Żółkowska, Mariusz Jakus, Philippe Tłokiński, Anna Żytka, Aleksandra Ciejek, Mieczysław Morański, Małgorzata Ścisłowicz, Ewa Trochim, Łukasz Żurek	24 November 2016

=== Season 17 (2017) ===
No. overall	No. in season	Title	Guest actors	Original release date
213	1	"Odkupienie"	Janusz Chabior, Piotr Kamiński, Paweł Kamiński, Małgorzata Bogdańska, Jakub Wróblewski, Jan Monczka, Wojciech Sanejko, Józef Reguła, Tadeusz Morański, Emilia Ziemnicka, Kinga Łukasik-Głód, Piotr Kondrat	2 March 2017
214	2	"Igranie z ogniem"	Jan Wieteska, Piotr Nowak, Grażyna Wolszczak, Łucja Rećko-Żarnecka, Rafał Szałajko, Waldemar Czyszak, Monika Szalaty, Zbigniew Kozłowski, Grzegorz Kulikowski	9 March 2017
215	3	"Gwiazdor"	Mariusz Bonaszewski, Karolina Kominek, Hanna Mikuć, Hanna Konarowska, Jan Korwin-Kochanowski, Agata Załęcka, Kinga Ciesielska, Rafał Olbrychski, Krzysztof Radkowski, Tomasz Ignaczak, Urszula Zawadzka-Wieteska	16 March 2017
216	4	"Sarkofag"	Krzysztof Stelmaszyk, Krzysztof Dracz, Ireneusz Kozioł, Roman Piętakiewicz, Cezary Kruk, Jacek Ryś, Tomasz Sapryk, Karina Seweryn, Bożena Furczyk, Adam Biernat, Mirosław Rzońca, Radosław Chabowski, Jacek Reda, Agnieszka Gałęziowska, Witold Bałusz, Robert Krajewski, Franciszek Bogórski, Marcin Gosz, Łukasz Makuch, Artur Bednarek, Marcin Urzyczyn	23 March 2017
217	5	"Wybór"	Katarzyna Zielińska, Mateusz Janicki, Marek Sawicki, Tomasz Sobczak, Grzegorz Kowalczyk, Marcin Błaszak, Łukasz Kornacki, Robert Buczyński, Daria Brudnias, Beata Chruścińska, Mariusz Odwarzny, Jan Krzysztof Szczygieł, Tomasz Łukaszek, Marek Pietuch, Barbara Wejner, Ewelina Śliwińska	30 March 2017
218	6	"Zakład"	Marian Opania, Hanna Wojak, Joanna Sydor, Matylda Paszczenko, Beata Kacprzyk, Krzysztof Konrad, Bartosz Banik, Jarosław Witaszczyk, Marta Termena-Polkowska, Natalia Jakubowska, Jacek Herba, Maksymilian Michasiów, Anna Felińska	6 April 2017
219	7	"Córka blacharza"	Mirosław Baka, Weronika Warchoł, Marta Alaborska, Krzysztof Szczepaniak, Łukasz Dziemidok, Leszek Żukowski, Grzegorz Emanuel, Natalia Keber, Ryszard Bauman, Piotr Rzymyszkiewicz, Bogdan Mamontowicz, Michał Winiarski, Tomasz Sapryk, Karina Seweryn	13 April 2017
220	8	"Czarna peleryna"	Jacek Kawalec, Klaudia Cygoń, Krzysztof Nowakowski, Jakub Wesołowski, Mateusz Rzeźniczak, Damian Kret, Patryk Czerniejewski, Ewa Szykulska, Agnieszka Pastuszko Mrozawska, Marek Nowakowski, Mirosław Rzońca	20 April 2017
221	9	"Fatalne spotkanie"	Piotr Szwedes, Szymon Piotr Warszawski, Marcin Kwaśny, Michał Lewandowski, Justyna Kacprzycka, Aleksandra Justa, Hanna Chmielarz, Andrzej Niemirski, Krzysztof Bień, Marek Walczak, Łukasz Mąka, Piotr Bała, Łukasz Jarzyński, Hanna Chojnacka - Gościniak, Artur Łodyga	27 April 2017
222	10	"Pingwin"	Mirosław Haniszewski, Barbara Kałużna, Arkadiusz Detmer, Katarzyna Ankudowicz, Jacek Rozenek, Agnieszka Warchulska, Andrzej Andrzejewski, Piotr Grabowski, Krzysztof Mateusiak, Michał Pietrzak	4 May 2017
223	11	"Przypadkowa druhna"	Katarzyna Dąbrowska, Katarzyna Cichopek, Piotr Zelt, Adam Adamonis, Barbara Zielińska, Emilia Krakowska, Andrzej Chichłowski, Małgorzata Lipka, Konrad Makowski, Urszula Zawadzka-Wieteska, Katarzyna Wasik, Marlena Durda, Sylwia Zawiszewska - Woźny, Remigiusz Kramek, Katarzyna Bernaś, Piotr Stopa, Hubert Jarczak	18 May 2017
224	12	"Chłopaki"	Adam Woronowicz, Konrad Skolimowski, Jasper Sołtysiewicz, Jakub Gola, Dominika Kryszczyńska, Jan Korwin-Kochanowski, Krzysztof Bochenek, Tomasz Borkowski, Joanna Kwiatkowska-Zduń, Rafał Sadowski, Olga Miłaszewska	25 May 2017
225	13	"Loteria"	Arkadiusz Janiczek, Magdalena Stużyńska, Ada Fijał, Oliwier Kozłowski, Marek Zawadzki, Sebastian Stankiewicz, Maria Broniewska, Konrad Pawlicki, Bartosz Tryboń, Bartosz Adamczyk, Bartosz Gajda, Wojciech Andrzejuk, Rafał Gerlach, Bartłomiej Zdanowicz, Michał Kasprzak-Komarczewski, Witold Bałusz	1 June 2017

=== Season 18 (2017) ===
No. overall	No. in season	Title	Original release date
226	1	"Złote jabłko"	31 August 2017
227	2	"Feralny powrót"	7 September 2017
228	3	"Pożegnanie"	14 September 2017
229	4	"Pasja"	21 September 2017
230	5	"Randka"	28 September 2017
231	6	"Dobry mąż"	5 October 2017
232	7	"15:10 do Skarżyska"	12 October 2017
233	8	"ZDRADA"	19 October 2017
234	9	"Mamusia"	26 October 2017
235	10	"Fryzjerka"	2 November 2017
236	11	"Smażalnia"	9 November 2017
237	12	"Wielka szansa"	16 November 2017
238	13	"Cud"	25 November 2017

=== Season 19 (2018) ===
No. overall	No. in season	Title	Original release date
239	1	"Hipisi"	1 March 2018
240	2	"Bezpieczna odległość"	8 March 2018
241	3	"Remont"	15 March 2018
242	4	"Filmowcy"	22 March 2018
243	5	"Narzeczona"	29 March 2018
244	6	"Sparring"	5 April 2018
245	7	"Salowy"	12 April 2018
246	8	"Polowanie na jelenie"	19 April 2018
247	9	"Wyzwolenie Łazarza"	26 April 2018
248	10	"Wina"	3 May 2018
249	11	"Mróz"	17 May 2018
250	12	"Nikotyna"	24 May 2018
251	13	"Jaki ojciec..."	31 May 2018

=== Season 20 (2018) ===
No. overall	No. in season	Title	Original release date
252	1	"Vistula Beach"	6 September 2018
253	2	"Ufo"	13 September 2018
254	3	"Gang Buciaruka"	20 September 2018
255	4	"El Greco"	27 September 2018
256	5	"Piłkarski pasjans"	4 October 2018
257	6	"Cytryny"	18 October 2018
258	7	"Zabójczy instynkt"	25 October 2018
259	8	"Zły los"	1 November 2018
260	9	"Odpowiedni moment"	8 November 2018
261	10	"Tajemnica chemika"	15 November 2018
262	11	"Bez hamulców"	22 November 2018
263	12	"Łopianowo"	29 November 2018
264	13	"Powołanie"	6 December 2018

=== Season 21 (2019) ===
No. overall	No. in season	Title	Original release date
265	1	"Bez wyjścia"	28 February 2019
266	2	"Gniew"	7 March 2019
267	3	"Reguły gry"	14 March 2019
268	4	"Akcja"	28 March 2019
269	5	"Figiel"	4 April 2019
270	6	"Iluzjonista"	11 April 2019
271	7	"Chwila nieuwagi"	18 April 2019
272	8	"Zawód zaufania publicznego"	25 April 2019
273	9	"Nieboszczyk na plebanii"	2 May 2019
274	12	"Koński raj"	9 May 2019
275	11	"Tajemnica spowiedzi"	30 May 2019
276	12	"Brat"	6 June 2019
277	13	"Blondynka z Dubaju"	13 June 2019

=== Season 22 (2019) ===
No. overall	No. in season	Title	Original release date
278	1	"Guru"	12 September 2019
279	2	"Przesyłka"	3 October 2019
280	3	"Lepsza przyszłość"	17 October 2019
281	4	"Piąta taryfa"	24 October 2019
282	5	"Pokój z widokiem"	31 October 2019
283	6	"Okup"	7 November 2019
284	7	"W zdrowym ciele..."	14 November 2019
285	8	"Panna na wydaniu"	21 November 2019
286	9	"Dżentelmeni"	28 November 2019
287	10	"Chrzestny"	5 December 2019
288	11	"Problemy małżeńskie"	12 December 2019
289	12	"Mistyfikacja"	19 December 2019
290	13	"Stalkerka"	26 December 2019

=== Season 23 (2020) ===
No. overall	No. in season	Title	Original release date
291	1	"Królik"	27 February 2020
292	2	"Ciemny Van"	5 March 2020
293	3	"Ryzykowna teoria"	12 March 2020
294	4	"Ciało"	19 March 2020
295	5	"Zamęt"	26 March 2020
296	6	"Tragedia w teatrze"	2 April 2020
297	7	"Mikroklimat"	9 April 2020
298	8	"Córeczka"	16 April 2020
299	9	"Oko za oko"	23 April 2020
300	10	"To ja Mateusz"	30 April 2020
301	11	"Trudny powrót"	7 May 2020
302	12	"Gość w dom"	14 May 2020
303	13	"Wokaliści" (Note: The regular broadcast of the series in the spring season lasted until 14 May 2020. Due to the COVID-19 pandemic, the last episode of the 23rd series was broadcast first in the autumn season.)	10 September 2020

=== Season 24 (2020) ===
No. overall	No. in season	Title	Original release date
304	1	"Niewidzialny"	17 September 2020
305	2	"Matura"	24 September 2020
306	3	"Na własną rękę"	1 October 2020
307	4	"Sprawa na gorąco"	8 October 2020
308	5	"Internetowi narzeczeni"	15 October 2020
309	6	"Pielgrzymka"	22 October 2020
310	7	"Lassie, zostań"	29 October 2020
311	8	"Ośrodek"	5 November 2020
312	9	"Certyfikat"	12 November 2020
313	10	"Klątwa"	19 November 2020
314	11	"Śmierć na raty"	26 November 2020
315	12	"Kameleon"	3 December 2020
316	13	"Fatalne zauroczenie"	10 December 2020

=== Season 25 (2021) ===
No. overall	No. in season	Title	Original release date
317	1	"Szeryf"	12 March 2021
318	2	"Telefon zaufania"	19 March 2021
319	3	"Tajemnica stroika"	26 March 2021
320	4	"Spadek"	9 April 2021
321	5	"Woda sodowa"	16 April 2021
322	6	"Plan idealny"	23 April 2021
323	7	"Ptaki"	30 April 2021
324	8	"Ostatnia akcja Szpicbródki"	7 May 2021
325	9	"Gambit hetmana"	14 May 2021
326	10	"Zadra"	21 May 2021
327	11	"Dług"	28 May 2021
328	12	"Chciwóść"	4 June 2021
329	13	"Niespodzianka"	10 September 2021

=== Season 26 (2021) ===
No. overall	No. in season	Title	Original release date
330	1	"Krwawy debiut"	17 September 2021
331	2	"Rosiczka"	24 September 2021
332	3	"Na psa urok"	1 October 2021
333	4	"Awans"	8 October 2021
334	5	"Niewinna"	15 October 2021
335	6	"Nowicjusz"	22 October 2021
336	7	"Zmyłka"	29 October 2021
337	8	"Przykrywkowiec"	5 November 2021
338	9	"Strzeżonego Pan Bóg strzeże"	19 November 2021
339	10	"Jak wiatr"	26 November 2021
340	11	"Przypadek"	3 December 2021
341	12	"Wycinka"	10 December 2021
342	13	"Warszawski adres"	17 December 2021

=== Season 27 (2022) ===
No. overall	No. in season	Title	Original release date
343	1	"Honorowe zabójstwo"	8 April 2022
344	2	"Miłość to idealne alibi"	4 March 2022
345	3	"Punkt dziesiąta"	11 March 2022
346	4	"Zmiana"	18 March 2022
347	5	"Pudło"	25 March 2022
348	6	"Siostrzycki"	1 April 2022
349	7	"Tanatos"	15 April 2022
350	8	"La Cucaracha"	22 April 2022
351	9	"Kurs na prawo"	29 April 2022
352	10	"Nadzieja umiera ostatnia"	6 May 2022
353	11	"Złamane serce"	13 May 2022
354	12	"Nie sądźcie..."	20 May 2022
355	13	"Diabeł na drodzie"	27 May 2022

=== Season 28 (2022) ===
Season 28 is scheduled for broadcast in 2022.

No. overall	No. in season	Title	Original release date
356	1	"Dzień wnuczka"	9 September 2022
357	2	"Młot na czarownice"	16 September 2022
358	3	"Influecerka"	23 September 2022
359	4	"Głos"	30 September 2022
360	5	"Dolina szczęścia"	7 October 2022
361	6	"Póki śmierć nas nie rozłączy"	14 October 2022
362	7	"Weekend z duchami"	21 October 2022
363	8	"Wataha"	28 October 2022
364	9	"Milczenie"	4 November 2022
365	10	"Duplikant"	18 November 2022
366	11	"Jeden pancerny"	16 December 2022
367	12	"Sztuka zysku"	23 December 2022
368	13	"Nigdy cię nie odpuszczę"	30 December 2022

=== Season 29 (2023) ===
No. overall	No. in season	Title	Original release date
369	1	"Nowy dom"	2 March 2023
370	2	"Amnezja"	9 March 2023
371	3	"Ostatni dzwonek"	16 March 2023
372	4	"Beryl"	23 March 2023
373	5	"Pozory mylą"	30 March 2023
374	6	"Zimna fuzja"	6 April 2023
375	7	"Samospełniająca się przepowiednia"	13 April 2023
376	8	"Na swoim miejscu"	20 April 2023
377	9	"Gorzki smak dojrzewania"	27 April 2023
378	10	"Poszkodowany, poszkodowana"	4 May 2023
379	11	"Autoterapia"	18 May 2023
380	12	"Ostatni taniec"	14 September 2023
381	13	"Sąd ostateczny"	21 September 2023

=== Season 30 (2023–2024) ===
No. overall	No. in season	Title	Original release date
382	1	"Kochane pieniążki"	28 September 2023
383	2	"Łabędzi śpiew"	5 October 2023
384	3	"Nocny kurs"	19 October 2023
385	4	"Żegnaj Natalio, żegnaj Mateuszu"	26 October 2023
386	5	"Lot nr. 772"	2 November 2023
387	6	"Upiór i zakonnica"	9 November 2023
388	7	"Znikający basen i alpaka"	16 November 2023
389	8	"Zodiak"	23 November 2023
390	9	"Sakrament pojedniania"	7 March 2024
391	10	"Co Bóg daje"	14 March 2024
392	11	"Błąd w sztuce"	28 March 2024
393	12	"Cywil"	4 April 2024
394	13	"Wyjść z dwiema twarzami"	11 April 2024

=== Season 31 (2024) ===
No. overall	No. in season	Title	Original release date
395	1	"Nowy image"	18 April 2024
396	2	"Dzień św. Huberta"	25 April 2024
397	3	"Droga na skróty"	2 May 2024
398	4	"Mecz o wszystko"	16 May 2024
399	5	"Bal u Konsula"	23 May 2024
400	6	"Zamach"	30 May 2024
401	7	"Karma"	12 September 2024
402	8	"Konkurencja"	19 September 2024
403	9	"Zagubieni w sieci"	26 September 2024
404	10	"Kwiaty dla kosmonauty"	3 October 2024
405	11	"Testerka wierności"	10 October 2024
406	12	"Bracia"	17 October 2024
407	13	"Odwyk"	24 October 2024

=== Season 32 (2024–2025) ===
No. overall	No. in season	Title	Original release date
408	1	"Witamy na pokładzie"	31 October 2024
409	2	"Sukcesja"	7 November 2024
410	3	"Noc wiary"	14 November 2024
411	4	"Sieciówka"	21 November 2024
412	5	"Bezsenność we dwoje"	28 November 2024
413	6	"Medium"	5 December 2024
414	7	"Polska czupakabra"	6 March 2025
415	8	"Zaraza"	13 March 2025
416	9	"Rycerz na białym koniu"	20 March 2025
417	10	"Zagorzały czytelnik"	27 March 2025
418	11	"Pocztówka z przeszłości"	3 April 2025
419	12	"Słodki drań"	10 April 2025
420	13	"Pieskie życie"	17 April 2025

=== Season 33 (2025) ===
No. overall	No. in season	Title	Original release date
421	1	"Detektyw bez teki"	24 April 2025
422	2	"Prognoza pogody"	1 May 2025
423	3	"Śmierć in blanco"	8 May 2025
424	4	"Kumulacja"	22 May 2025
425	5	"Mały Szu"	29 May 2025
426	6	"Sprawa Kramskich"	5 June 2025
427	7	"Pączek z adwokatem"	11 September 2025
428	8	"Hiena"	18 September 2025
429	9	"Niewierny Tomasz"	25 September 2025
430	10	""M" jak mężczyzna"	2 October 2025
431	11	"Puszka Pandory"	16 October 2025
432	12	"Kryzys"	23 October 2025
433	13	"Okno życia"	30 October 2025

=== Season 34 (2025–2026) ===
No. overall	No. in season	Title	Original release date
434	1	"Uciec przed sprawiedliwością"	6 November 2025
435	2	"Dwa światy"	13 November 2025
436	3	"Siostra swojego brata"	20 November 2025
437	4	"Presto funebre"	27 November 2025
438	5	"Pamięc absolutna"	4 December 2025
439	6	"Wizytacja"	11 December 2025
440	7	"Winnica Pana Ricciego"	5 March 2026
441	8	"Życie po życiu"	12 March 2026
442	9	"Łamigłówka"	19 March 2026
443	10	"Syndrom sandomierski"	2 April 2026
444	11	"Wieczny niespoczynek"	9 April 2026
445	12	"Cynober"	16 April 2026
446	13	"Szwalnia numer pięc"	23 April 2026

=== Season 35 (2026) ===
No. overall	No. in season	Title	Original release date
447	1	"Obiekt"	30 April 2026
448	2	"Matka na życzenie"	7 May 2026
449	3	"Awizo"	21 May 2026
450	4	"Kuracja"	28 May 2026
451	5	"Miłość na wagę"	10 September 2026
452	6	"Opętanie"	17 September 2026
453	7	"Centuś"	24 September 2026
454	8	"Rumba dla początkujących"	1 October 2026
455	9	"Docent"	8 October 2026
456	10	"Niewielka improwizacja"	15 October 2026
457	11	"Fałszywa nuta"	22 October 2026
458	12	"Crisi fidei"	29 October 2026
459	13	"Dom niespokojnej starości"	5 November 2026

=== Season 36 (2026–2027) ===
No. overall	No. in season	Title	Original release date
460	1	"Trzy Zdrowaśki"	12 November 2026
461	2	"Przybysze z Manhattanu"	19 November 2026
462	3	"Paragraf 130"	26 November 2026
463	4	"Dziewczyna z lasu"	3 December 2026
464	5	"Bal u konsula"	10 December 2026
465	6	TBA	4 March 2027
466	7	TBA	11 March 2027
467	8	TBA	18 March 2027
468	9	TBA	1 April 2027
469	10	TBA	8 April 2027
470	11	TBA	15 April 2027
471	12	TBA	22 April 2027
472	13	TBA	29 April 2027
