= Pieczyński =

Pieczyński (feminine: Pieczyńska; plural: Pieczyńscy) is a Polish surname. Notable people with this surname include:

- Andrzej Pieczyński (born 1956), Polish actor
- Emma Pieczynska-Reichenbach (1854–1927), Swiss abolitionist and feminist
- Krzysztof Pieczyński (born 1957), Polish actor
- Małgorzata Pieczyńska (born 1960), Polish actress
