= Zero (2009 film) =

- Film poster
- Directed by: Paweł Borowski
- Starring: Robert Więckiewicz; Aleksandra Popławska
- Release date: 15 September 2009 (GFF)
- Running time: 110 minutes
- Country: Poland
- Language: Polish

Zero is a 2009 Polish action film directed by Paweł Borowski.

== Cast ==
- Robert Więckiewicz − Chairman
- Aleksandra Popławska − Chairman's wife
- Bogdan Koca − Private detective
- Cezary Kosiński − Employee of the Chairman's company
- Andrzej Mastalerz − Newspaper seller
- Roma Gąsiorowska − Porno star
- Małgorzata Buczkowska - Cashier
- Przemysław Bluszcz − Porno film producer
- Michał Żurawski - Chairman's wife lover
