= Mamuśki =

- Genre: Comedy
- Written by: Jarosław Sokół
- Directed by: Andrzej Kostenko (season 1); Adek Drabiński (season 2)
- Starring: Michał Rolnicki; Katarzyna Ankudowicz; Stanisława Celińska; Tomasz Karolak; Krzysztof Stelmaszyk; Ewa Wencel
- Composer: Misha Hairulin
- Country of origin: Poland
- Original language: Polish
- No. of seasons: 2
- No. of episodes: 30

Production
- Producer: Małgorzata Fogel-Gabryś
- Cinematography: Krzysztof Pakulski (season 1); Andrzej Glacel (season 2)
- Editor: Jarosław Barzan
- Camera setup: Fullscreen (4:3)
- Running time: 21 minutes
- Production company: Polsat

Original release
- Network: Polsat
- Release: 1 March – 17 June 2007

Mamuśki (Polish: [maˈmuɕ.ki]; lit. 'Mommies') is a 2007 Polish-language comedy television series directed by Andrzej Kostenko in season 1, and Adek Drabiński in season 2, written by Jarosław Sokół, and produced by Małgorzata Fogel-Gabryś. The series aired from 1 March 2007, to 17 July 2007, on Polsat television channel. It has 2 seasons, and a total of 30 episodes, each with a running time of 21 minutes.

== Plot ==
Mirosław "Mirek" Czajka and Patrycja Sroka, who live in Warsaw, Poland, decide to get married. Mirek works as a cable television installer, while Patrycja works in an international advertising agency. Their parents are against marriage due to the different social statuses of both the couple and their families.

== Cast ==
- Michał Rolnicki as Mirosław "Mirek" Czajka
- Katarzyna Ankudowicz as Patrycja Sroka
- Stanisława Celińska as Halina Czajka
- Tomasz Karolak as Rysiek Czajka
- Krzysztof Stelmaszyk as Tadeusz Sroka
- Ewa Wencel as Aleksandra Sroka
- Zbigniew Buczkowski as Marian Czajka
- Grzegorz Wons as Zbyszek
- Piotr Skarga as Zygmunt Kania
- Daria Widawska as Zyta
- Elżbieta Jarosik as Czerwińska
- Anna Borowiec as Wasilewska
- Iwona Rulewicz as a woman who calls Magia TV

== Production ==
The series was written by Jarosław Sokół, and produced by Małgorzata Fogel-Gabryś. The first season was directed by Andrzej Kostenko, while the cinematography was done by Krzysztof Pakulski, and the scenography by Barbara Ostapowicz. The second season was directed by Adek Drabiński, while the cinematography was done by Andrzej Glacel, and the scenography by Paulina Szpila. Throughout the production of the show, the editing was done by Jarosław Barzan, and music by Misha Hairulin. The main cast included Michał Rolnicki, Katarzyna Ankudowicz, Stanisława Celińska, Tomasz Karolak, Krzysztof Stelmaszyk, and Ewa Wencel. The series was produced in 2007 by Polsat. The first season, which consists of 16 episodes, was aired on Polsat from 1 March 2007 to 17 July 2007, while the second season, which consists of 14 episodes, was aired from 1 September 2007 to 1 December 2007. In total, the series has 30 episodes, each with a running time of 21 minutes.
