= How to Get Rid of Cellulite =

2011 Polish film by Andrzej Saramonowicz

- Theatrical release poster
- Directed by: Andrzej Saramonowicz
- Written by: Andrzej Saramonowicz
- Produced by: Andrzej Saramonowicz
- Starring: Magdalena Boczarska; Dominika Kluźniak; Maja Hirsch; Tomasz Kot; Wojciech Mecwaldowski; Cezary Kosiński; Rafał Rutkowski
- Cinematography: Tomasz Madejski
- Edited by: Jarosław Barzan
- Music by: Wojciech Lemańsk
- Production company: San Graal
- Distributed by: Warner Bros. Pictures
- Release date: 4 February 2011
- Running time: 106 minutes
- Country: Poland
- Language: Polish
- Box office: $2.4 million

How to Get Rid of Cellulite (Polish: Jak się pozbyć cellulitu) is a 2011 Polish comedy film written and directed by Andrzej Saramonowicz.

The film was released on 4 February 2011 by Warner Bros. Pictures as part of a two-film distribution deal with Saramonowicz's production company San Graal.

== Cast ==
- Magdalena Boczarska as Kornelia Matejko
- Dominika Kluźniak as Ewa Silberberg
- Maja Hirsch as Maja Minorska
- Tomasz Kot as Maciej Zgirski
- Wojciech Mecwaldowski as Krystian Parzyszek
- Cezary Kosiński as Jerry
- Rafał Rutkowski as Jakub Silberberg
