= By Touch =

1986 film by Magdalena Łazarkiewicz

- VHS cover
- Directed by: Magdalena Łazarkiewicz
- Written by: Magdalena Łazarkiewicz; Ilona Lepkowska
- Cinematography: Krzysztof Pakulski
- Edited by: Ewa Pakulska
- Music by: Zbigniew Preisner
- Release date: September 24, 1986 (Poland)
- Running time: 79 mins.
- Country: Poland
- Language: Polish

By Touch (Polish: Przez dotyk) is a 1986 Polish film directed by Magdalena Łazarkiewicz and written by Łazarkiewicz and Ilona Lepkowska. It was released in Poland on September 24, 1986.

== Cast ==
- Barbara Chojecka
- Tadeusz Chudecki as Priest
- Maria Ciunelis as Teresa Jankowska
- Zuzanna Helska
- Wieslaw Kowalczyk
- Izabela Laskowska
- Antoni Lazarkiewicz as Tomek
- Milogost Reczek as Doctor
- Teresa Sawicka as Doctor
- Krzysztof Stelmaszyk as Adam, Anna's husband
- Grażyna Szapołowska as Anna
- Irena Szymkiewicz
- Jerzy Trela as Professor
- Wanda Weslaw-Idzinska
- Maria Zbyszewska

== Awards ==
In 1986, By Touch won the Grand Prix at the Créteil International Women's Film Festival and the award for Best Cinematography at the Polish Film Festival.

== IMDb links ==
- By Touch at IMDb
