= Maria Ciesielska (actress) =

Polish actress (born 1934)

- Born: 15 August 1934 (age 92); Inowrocław, Poland
- Education: AST National Academy of Theatre Arts in Kraków
- Occupation: Actress
- Years active: 1955–present
- Awards: Meritorious Activist of Culture; 1988

Maria Ciesielska (born 15 August 1934) is a Polish theatre, film, and dubbing actress. She was born in Inowrocław. In 1955, she graduated from the State Higher School of Acting, Kraków (now AST National Academy of Theatre Arts). The same year, she began acting at the Kraków Old Theatre. Her first work in cinema was an episodic role in Godziny nadziei (1955), directed by Jan Rybkowski. In 1988, she received the Meritorious Activist of Culture award.

== Selected filmography ==
- 1955 – Godziny nadziei
- 1956 – Zimowy zmierzch
- 1958 – Dezerter
- 1960 – Powrót
- 1960 – Bad Luck
- 1961 – Kwiecień
- 1961 – Birth Certificate
- 1962 – Między brzegami
- 1964 – Nieznany
- 1965 – Miejsce dla jednego
- 1967 – The Nutcracker
- 1968 – Dzieci z naszej szkoły (TV series)
- 1971 – Bolesław Śmiały
- 1979 – Doktor Murek (TV series)
- 2016 – Father Matthew (TV series)
