= Father Matthew (TV series) =

Polish television drama series

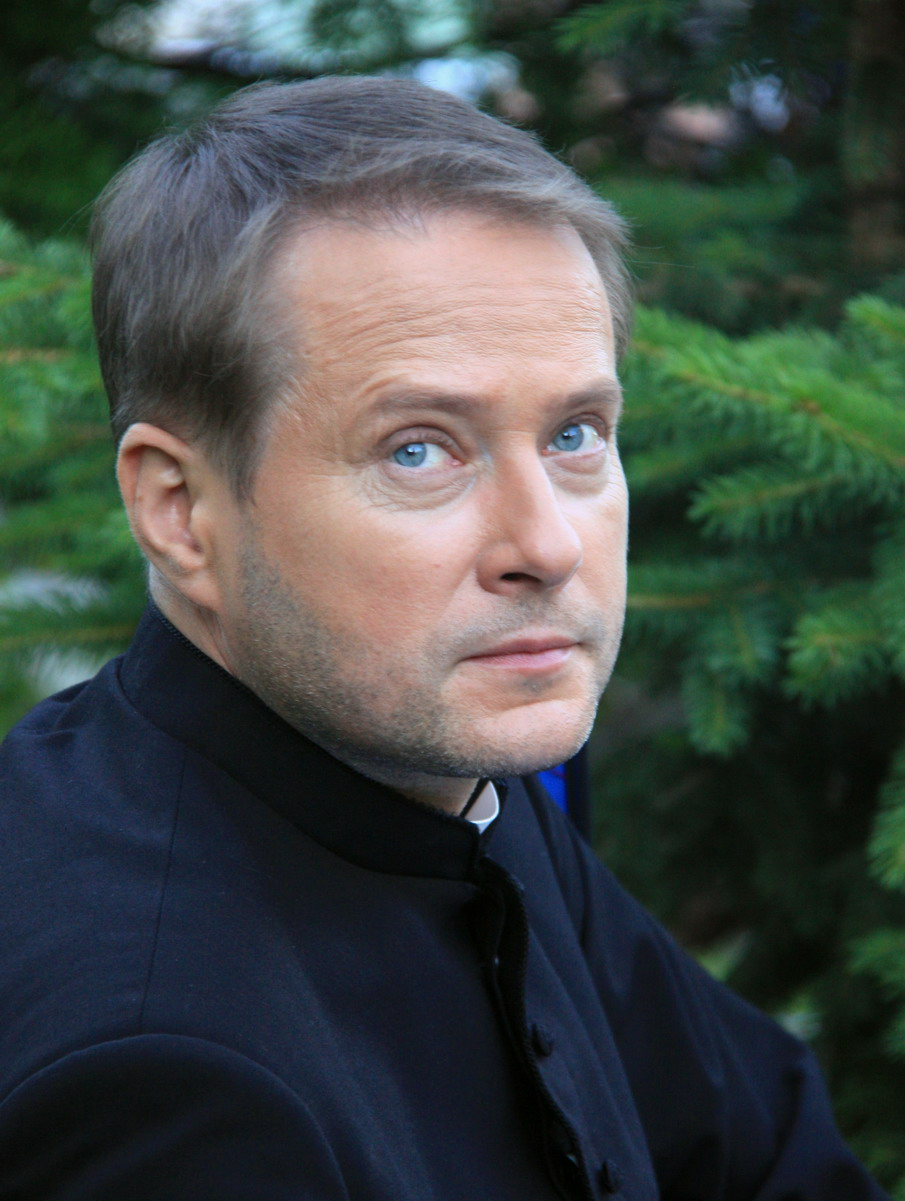
- The title character, Father Mateusz
- Genre: Detective show
- Based on: Don Matteo
- Developed by: Krzysztof Grabowski; Film Group Baltmedia; Baltmedia Sp. z oo
- Starring: Artur Żmijewski; Piotr Polk; Michał Piela; Kinga Preis; Maciej Musiał; Sławomir Orzechowski; Piotr Kozłowski; Łukasz Lewandowski; Aleksandra Górska; Tamara Arciuch
- Theme music composer: Michał Lorenc
- Country of origin: Poland
- Original language: Polish
- No. of seasons: 34
- No. of episodes: 446 (list of episodes)

Production
- Production location: Sandomierz

Original release
- Network: TVP1
- Release: November 11, 2008 – present

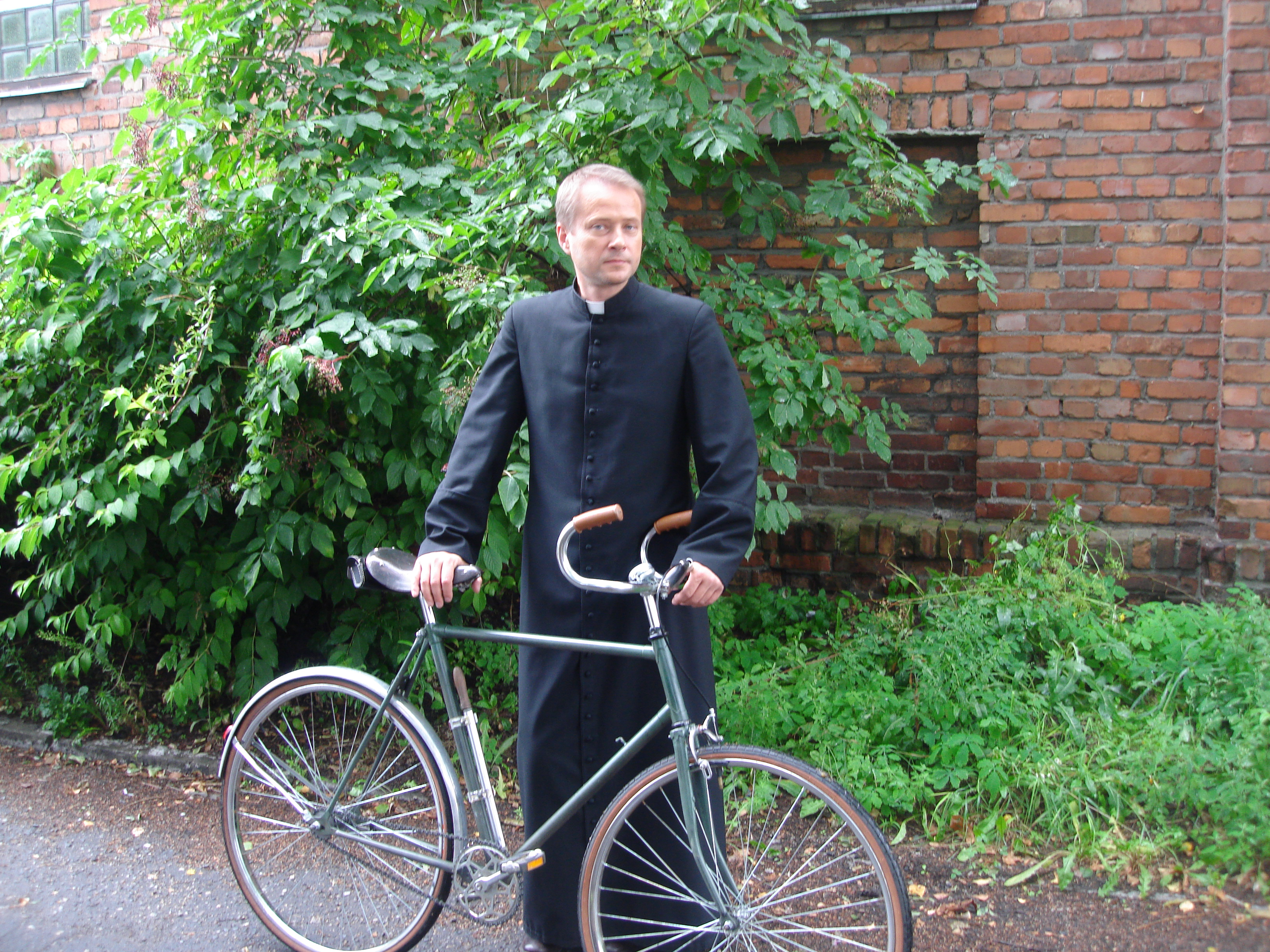
Father Mateusz with his familiar bike

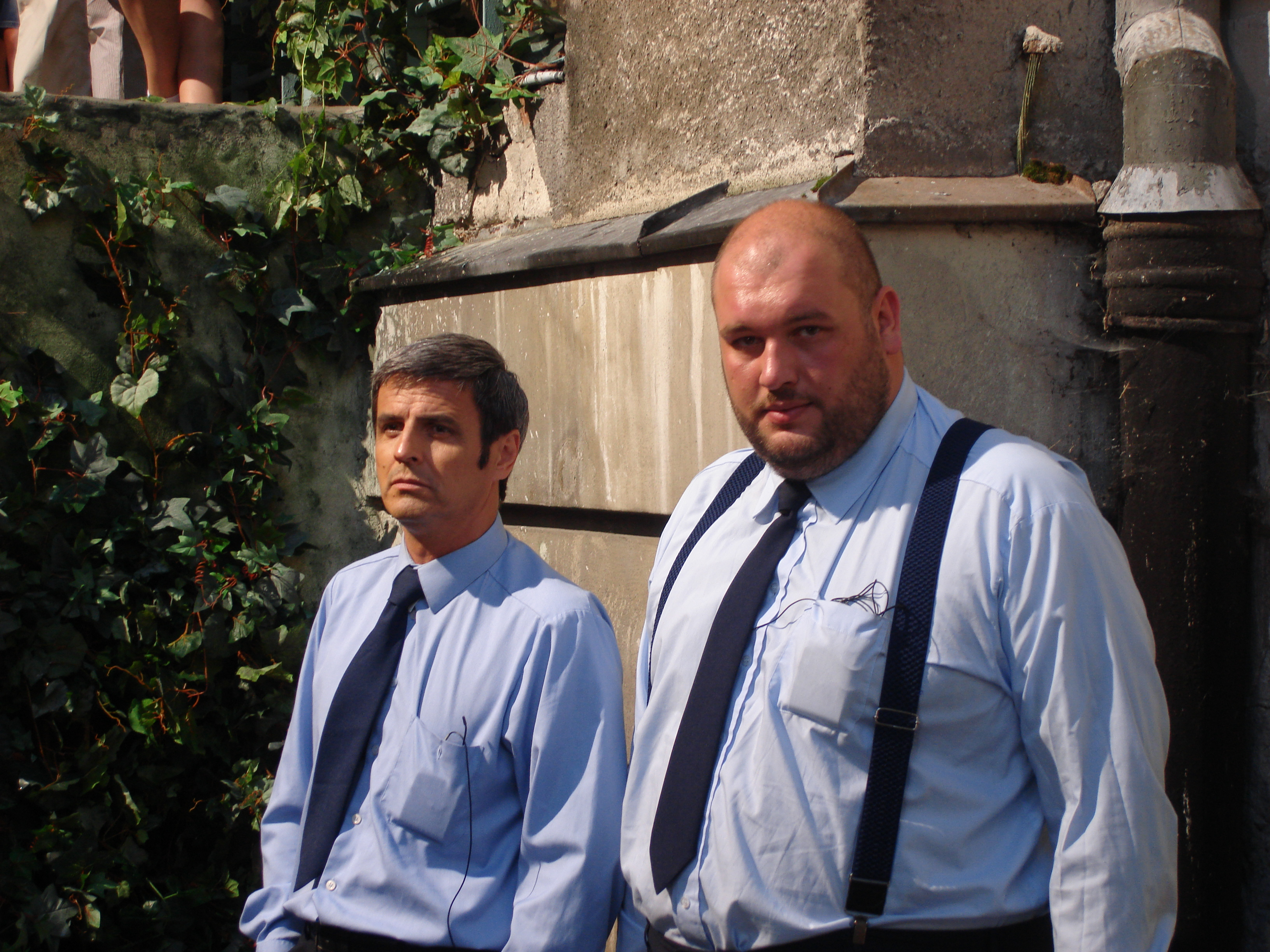
Inspector Możejko and Aspirant Nocul

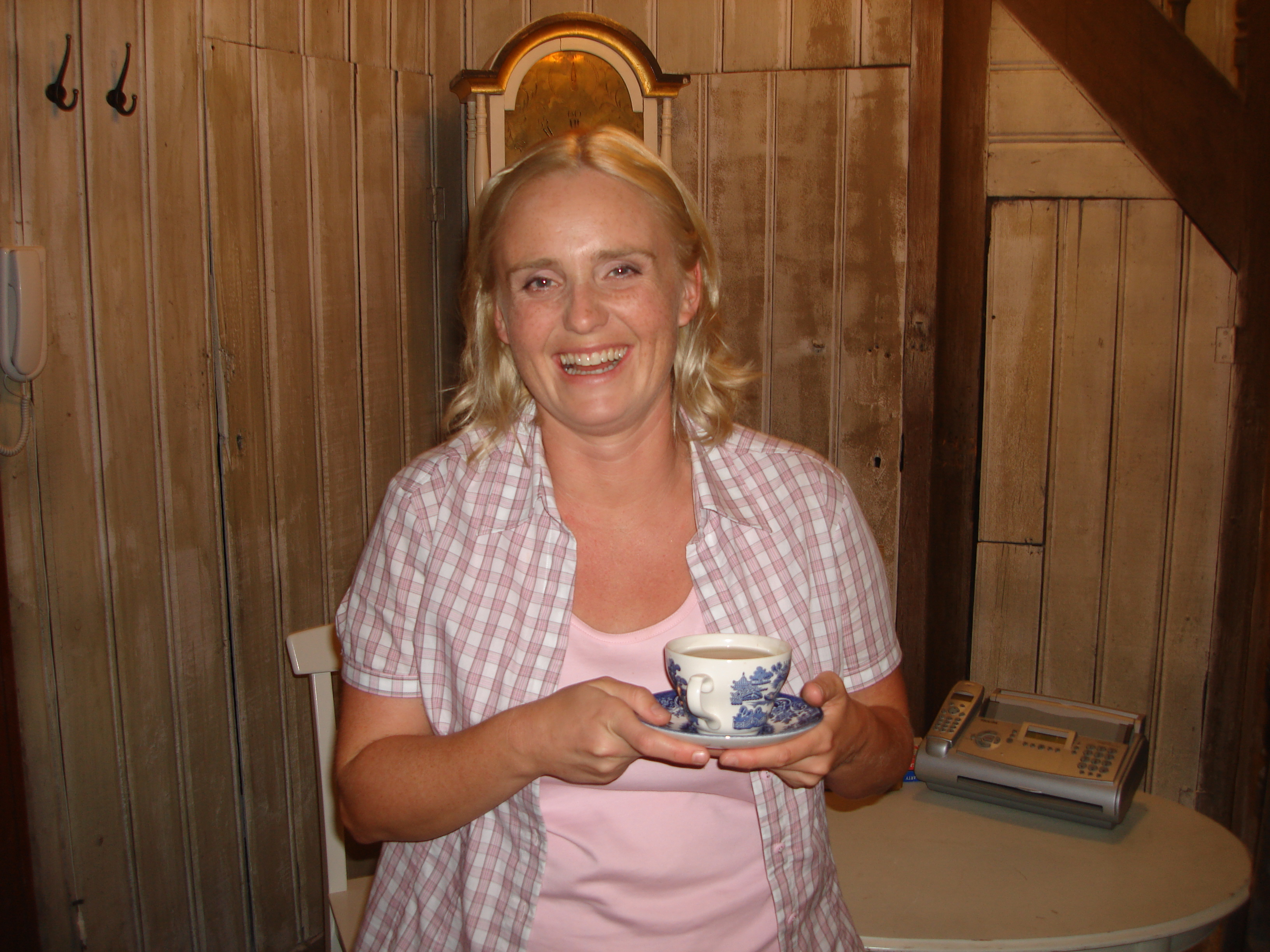
Natalia Borowik

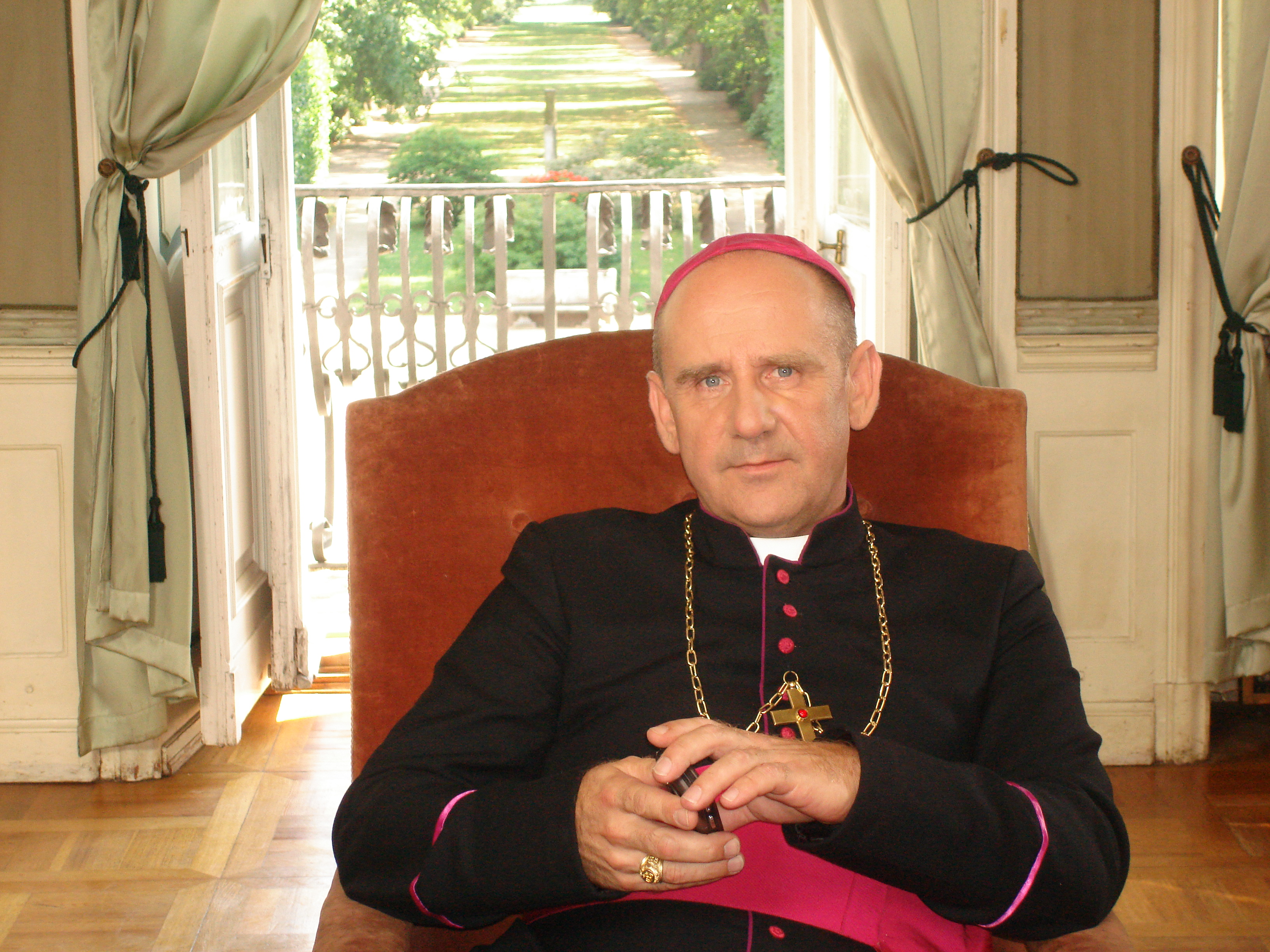
The Bishop

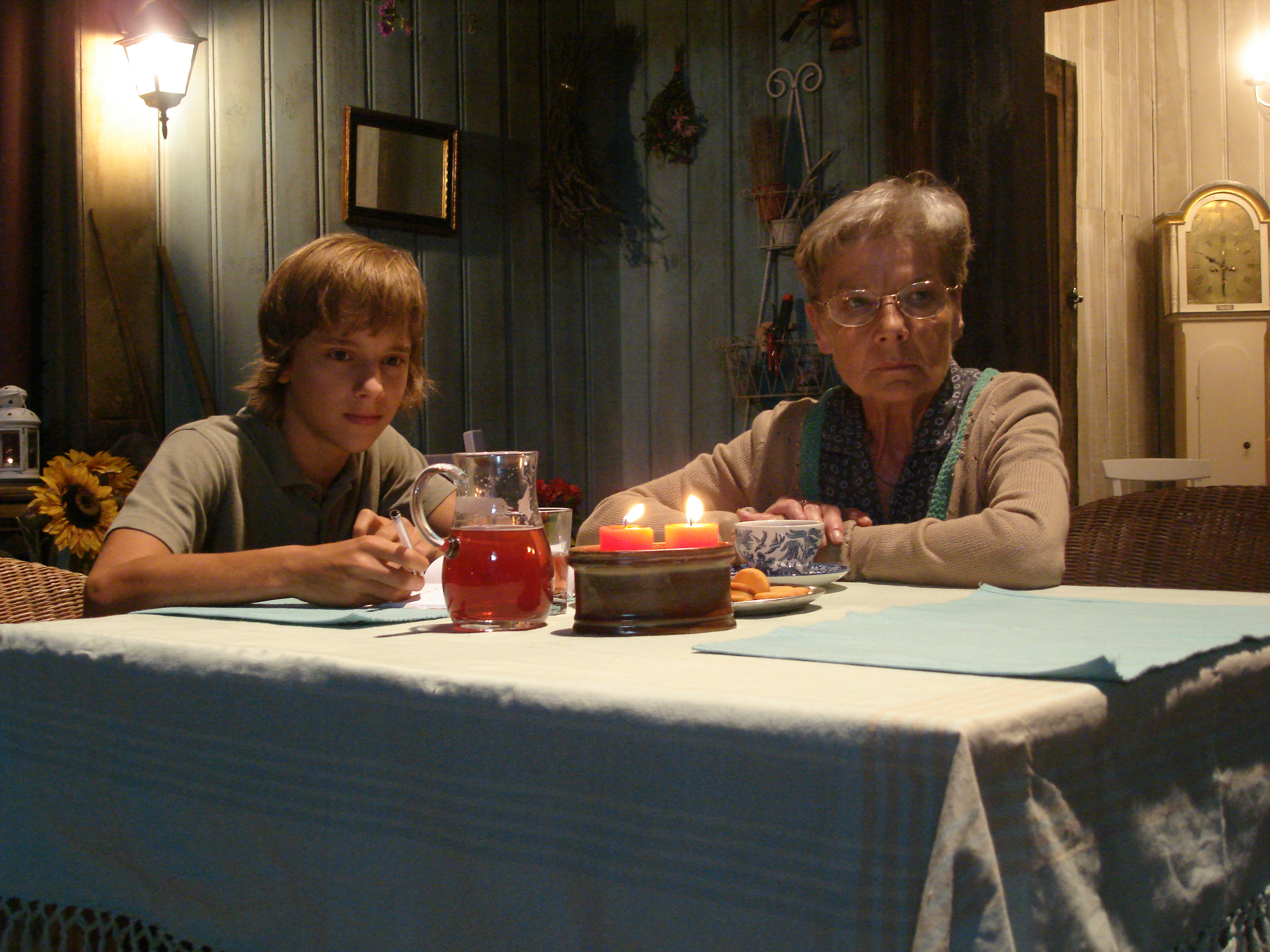
Grandma Lucyna and Michał

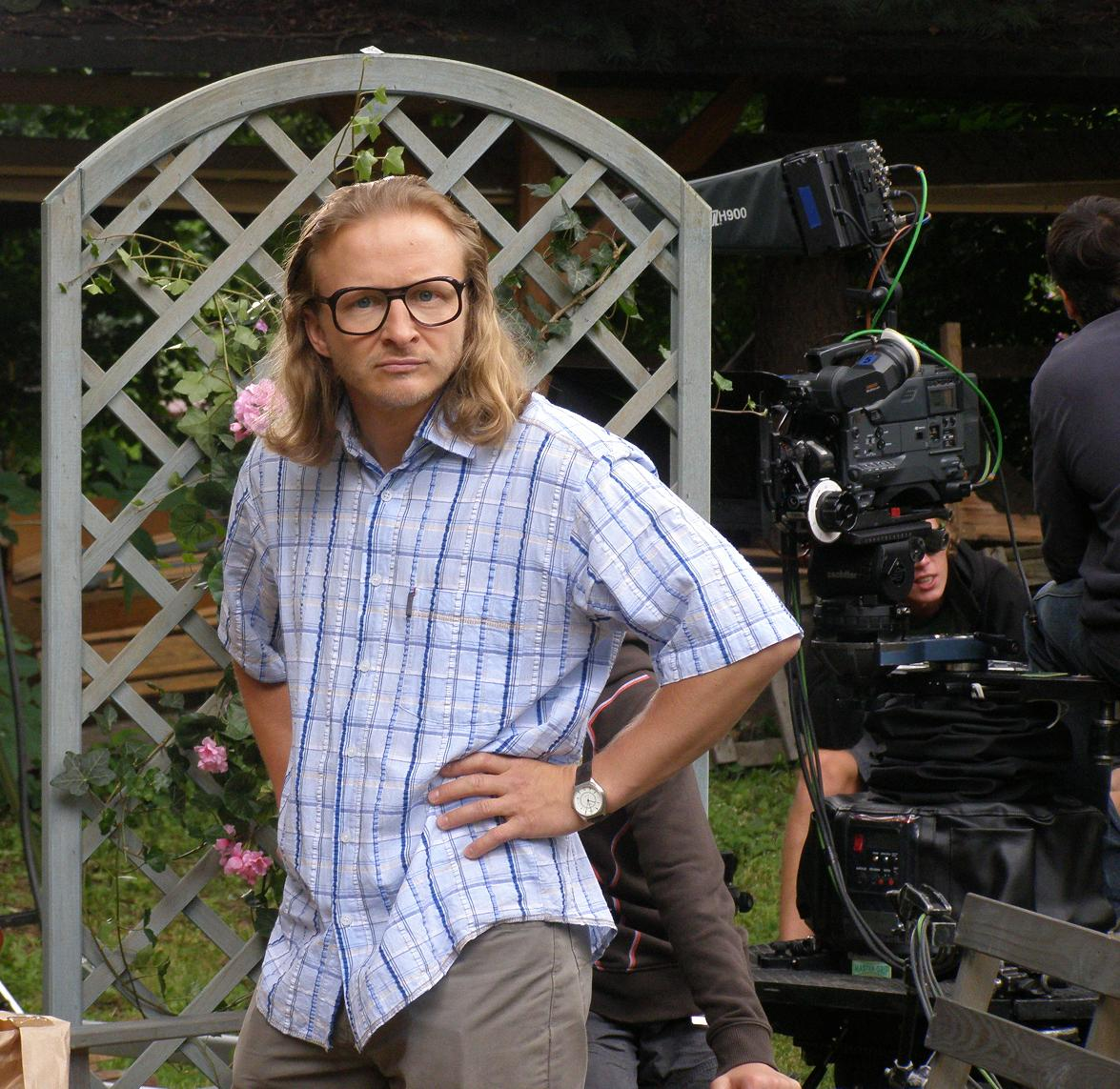
The Verger Piotr

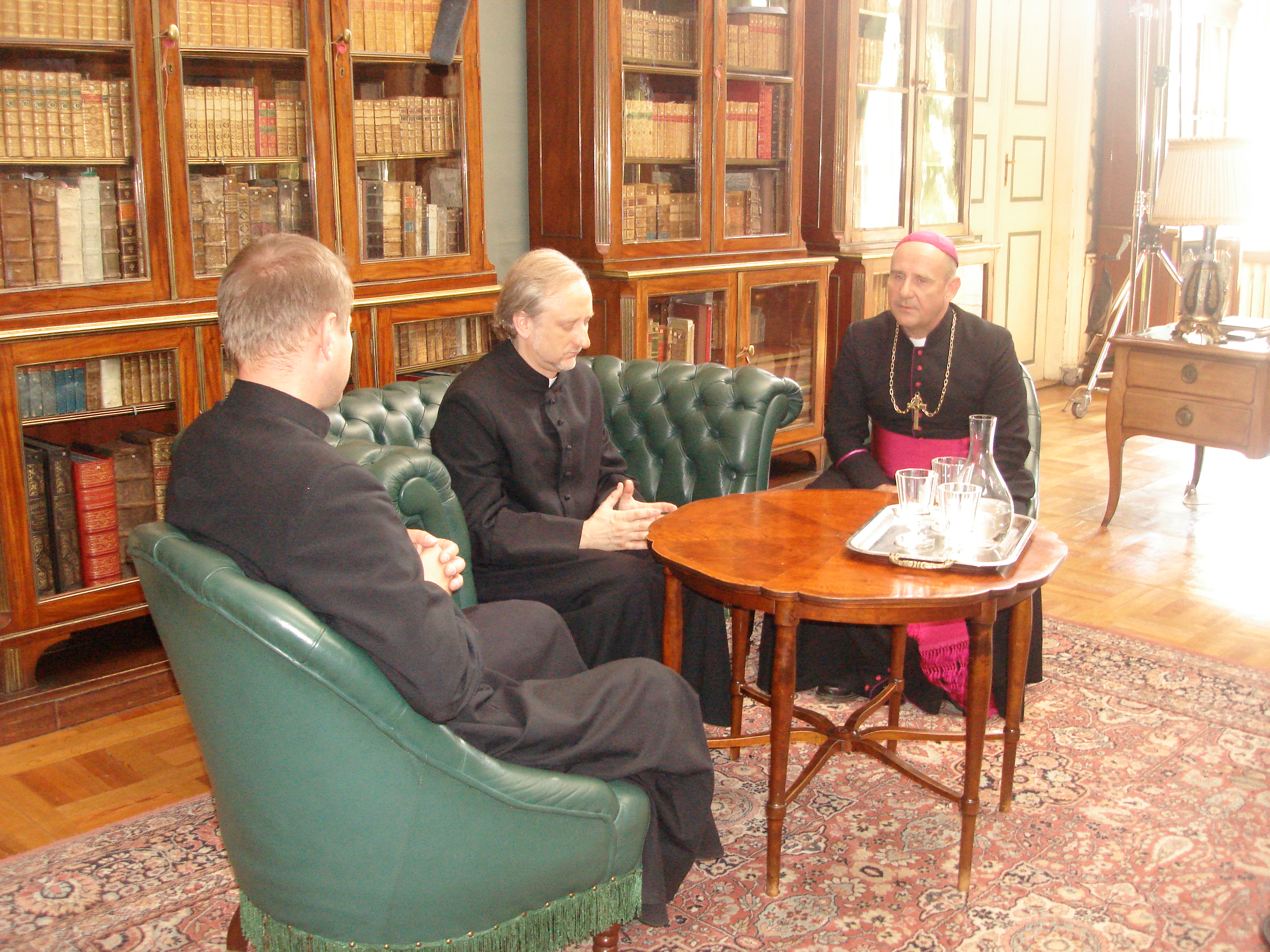
Father Mateusz visiting the Bishop. From left: Father Mateusz, Father Jacek and the Bishop

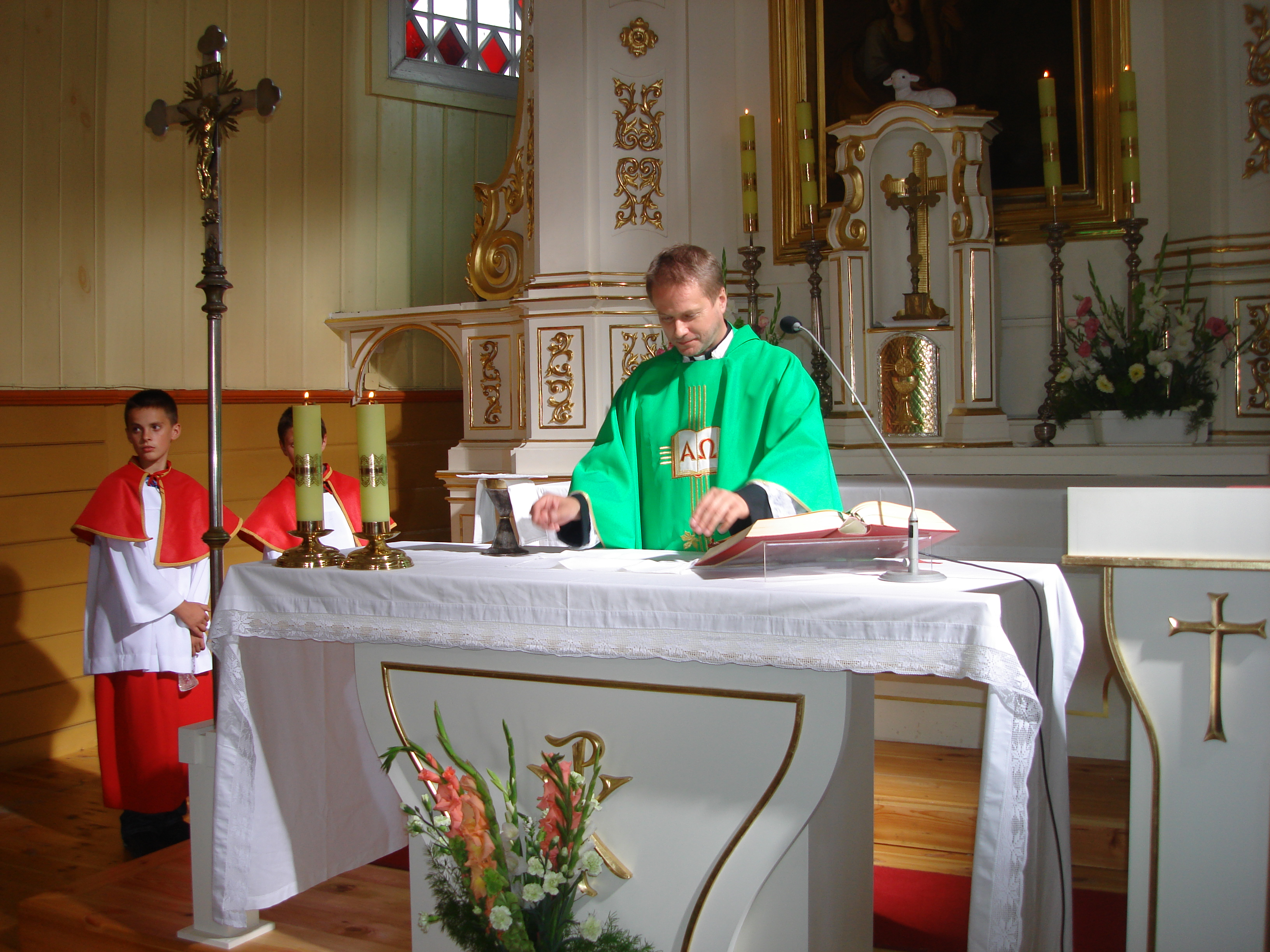
A scene from the show

Ojciec Mateusz (English: Father Matthew) is a Polish television drama series, which has aired on TVP1 since November 11, 2008. It is a Polish version of the Italian detective series Don Matteo broadcast in Italy by Rai Uno.

The show is set in the town of Sandomierz, although scenes in the church are recorded in Glinianka near Otwock, the vicarage in Anin in Warsaw, and the office of the bishop is filmed in the Nieborów Palace. In the fourth series, some episodes take place outside of Sandomierz, including in Kielce, Bałtów, Krzyżtopór, Busko-Zdrój and Opatów, as well as Ćmielów, Wąchock and Zalew Sielpia.

== Plot ==
The series shows the adventures of a Roman Catholic priest who, after returning to Poland from a mission to Belarus, is sent to work in a small parish in Sandomierz. As a pastor, together with a friendly policeman, he solves mysteries and gives help to his parishioners, as well as all those who are in need. Each episode is a separate story.

== Main characters ==
- Father Mateusz Żmigrodzki (Artur Żmijewski) – a Catholic priest. After years of working in Belarus, he returns to Poland and takes a job as a priest in Sandomierz. He has a unique talent for solving crimes, which leads him to delve into many mysteries. He is extremely brilliant, intelligent and perceptive. In episodes in which he doesn't help to solve the case, he is often seen absolving the offender just before he or she gets arrested.
- Inspector Orest Możejko (Piotr Polk) - a police inspector. He is overbearing and always convinced he is right about his cases. He was initially skeptical about Father Mateusz's talents. He is a non-practicing Catholic atheist.
- Junior commissioner Mieczysław Nocul (Michał Piela) - a Commissioner in the police and one of Orest Możejko's staff. At the beginning of the show he was a junior policeman, but has been gradually been promoted. He is a friend of Father Mateusz and co-operates with him, and in some episodes he actually solves the cases himself separately from Father Mateusz, meeting him as he tried to make the offender acknowledge their guilt and repent.
- Natalia Borowik (Kinga Preis) - housekeeper at Father Mateusz's rectory. Grumpy, funny, loyal and devoted to the priest. Her musings often bring Father Mateusz inspiration for solving criminal problems.
- The Bishop (Sławomir Orzechowski) - the bishop of the diocese. He has known Father Mateusz for years and after Father Mateusz's return to Poland entrusts him with his new role in Sandomierz. Despite reports on the unconventional behaviour of Father Mateusz, often fuelled by the secretary - Father Jacek - he has full confidence in Father Mateusz and turns a blind eye to his detective work, although Mateusz does not overstep his boundaries and takes his job as a Catholic priest above everything else.
- Lucyna Wielicka (Aleksandra Górska) and Michał Wielicki (Maciej Musiał) – the inhabitants of the rectory. After their eviction from their home, and much to the dismay of Natalia, Father Mateusz decided to take the family under his roof, and they are treated like his relatives.
- Waldemar Grzelak "Bug" (Eryk Lubos) - a former prisoner. He currently lives in the rectory with Father Mateusz; he met him in prison when he was wrongfully accused of committing an offence, then he became one of Mateusz's friends.
- Justyna Malec (Tamara Arciuch) - the former Mayor of Sandomierz and now Editor-in-chief of the local newspaper, former love interest of Inspector Orest Możejko.
- Daria - Dominik's mother. She is a journalist and travels a lot, and is the wife of Orest Możejko.
- Dominik - Orest Możejko and Daria's son.

== Cast ==
Actor	Role	Status
Artur Żmijewski	Father Mateusz Żmigrodzki	season 1–present
Piotr Polk	Inspector Orest Możejko	season 1–present
Michał Piela	Police Comissioner Mieczysław Nocul	season 1–present
Kinga Preis	Natalia Borowik	season 1–present
Aleksandra Górska	Lucyna Wielicka	season 1–present
Artur Pontek	Police Sergeant Marian Marczak	season 1–present
Rafał Cieszyński	Police Sergeant Przemysław Gibalski	season 1–present
Tomasz Więcek	Senior Police Constable Ludwik Banaś	seasons 1–3
Piotr Miazga	Senior Police Constable Bronisław Wierzbicki	seasons 1–18, 20, 22, 26
Jędrzej Taranek	Police Sergeant Jędrzej Paruzel	seasons 1–present
Sławomir Orzechowski	Bishop	seasons 1–present
Julia Kornacka	Zosia Nocul	seasons 4–9, 12, 14, 16, 18, 20
Agnieszka Doczyńska	Zosia Nocul	23–24, 26, 28–29
Piotr Kozłowski	Father Jacek Kolanko	seasons 1–present
Tamara Arciuch	Justyna Malec	seasons 3–16, 18–24
Ewa Konstancja Bułhak	Barbara Nocul	seasons 1–present
Katarzyna Burakowska	Emilka Kozłowska	seasons 3–23, 25
Eryk Lubos	Waldemar Grzelak "Bug"	seasons 1, 4–27
Łukasz Lewandowski	Verger Piotr Derlacki	seasons 1–12
Beata Olga Kowalska	Pathologist	seasons 11–15, 18–19, 22–26
Paulina Chapko	Police Sergeant Karolina Górska	seasons 8–11
Gabriela Pietrucha	Ola Nocul	seasons 2–9, 12
Maciej Musiał	Michał Wielicki	seasons 1–4, 6–7, 22–23
Bartłomiej Firlet	Antoni Dziubak	seasons 15–present
Kamil Szklany	Bolek Śmiały	seasons 29–32
Karol Lelek	Tomek Szmorąg	seasons 29–32

== Episodes ==
Series	Title	Episodes	Originally released	
Series	Title	Episodes	First released	Last released
1	I	13	7 December 2008	22 February 2009
2	II	17	6 September 2009	27 December 2009
3	III	14	4 March 2010	3 June 2010
4	IV	12	9 September 2010	25 November 2010
5	V	13	3 March 2011	26 May 2011
6	VI	13	8 September 2011	2 December 2011
7	VII	13	8 March 2012	31 May 2012
8	VIII	13	6 September 2012	29 November 2012
9	IX	13	28 February 2013	23 May 2013
10	X	13	5 September 2013	28 November 2013
11	XI	13	6 March 2014	29 May 2014
12	XII	13	4 September 2014	27 November 2014
13	XIII	13	5 March 2015	28 May 2015
14	XIV	13	3 September 2015	26 November 2015
15	XV	13	3 March 2016	26 May 2016
16	XVI	13	1 September 2016	24 November 2016
17	XVII	13	2 March 2017	27 May 2017
18	XVIII	13	31 August 2017	23 November 2017
19	XIX	13	1 March 2018	24 May 2018
20	XX	13	6 September 2018	29 November 2018
21	XXI	13	28 February 2019	13 June 2019
22	XXII	13	12 September 2019	26 December 2019
23	XXIII	13	27 February 2020	10 September 2020
24	XXIV	13	17 September 2020	10 December 2020
25	XXV	13	4 March 2021	10 September 2021
26	XXVI	13	17 September 2021	17 December 2021
27	XXVII	13	4 March 2022	27 May 2022
28	XXVIII	13	9 September 2022	30 December 2022
29	XXIX	13	8 September 2023	21 September 2023
30	XXX	13	28 September 2023	11 April 2024
31	XXXI	13	18 April 2024	24 October 2024
32	XXXII	13	31 October 2024	17 April 2025
33	XXXIII	13	24 April 2025	30 October 2025
34	XXXIV	13	6 November 2025	23 April 2026
35	XXXV	13	30 April 2026	5 November 2026
36	XXXVI	13	12 November 2026	22 April 2027
37	XXXVII	13	29 April 2027	TBA

== Father Mateusz for Sandomierz ==
As a result of the floods that hit central Europe in 2010, a charity concert was held in Sandomierz's Old Town on June 19, 2010, to help those who had suffered. A number of actors including Artur Zmijewski, Kinga Preis, Michael Piela, Piotr Polk and Tamara Arciuch from Ojciec Mateusz, musicians Andrzej Piaseczny, Artur Gadowski, Łukasz Zagrobelny, and bands including Big Cyc, Pectus, and Blue Café participated.

Artur Zmijewski led the concert along with journalist and TV presenter Paulina Chylewska and the event was broadcast on June 19, 2010, on TVP1.

== Awards ==
- The "Telekamera 2011" for Best Drama weekly awarded for 2010 by the readers of Tele Week in February 2011.
- The "Telekamera 2017" for Best Drama awarded for 2016 by the readers of Tele Week in February 2017.
- The "Telekamera 2019" for Best Drama awarded for 2018 by the readers of Tele Week in February 2019.
- The "Golden Telekamera 2020"

== See also ==
- Don Matteo
