= Andrzej Saramonowicz =

Polish film director

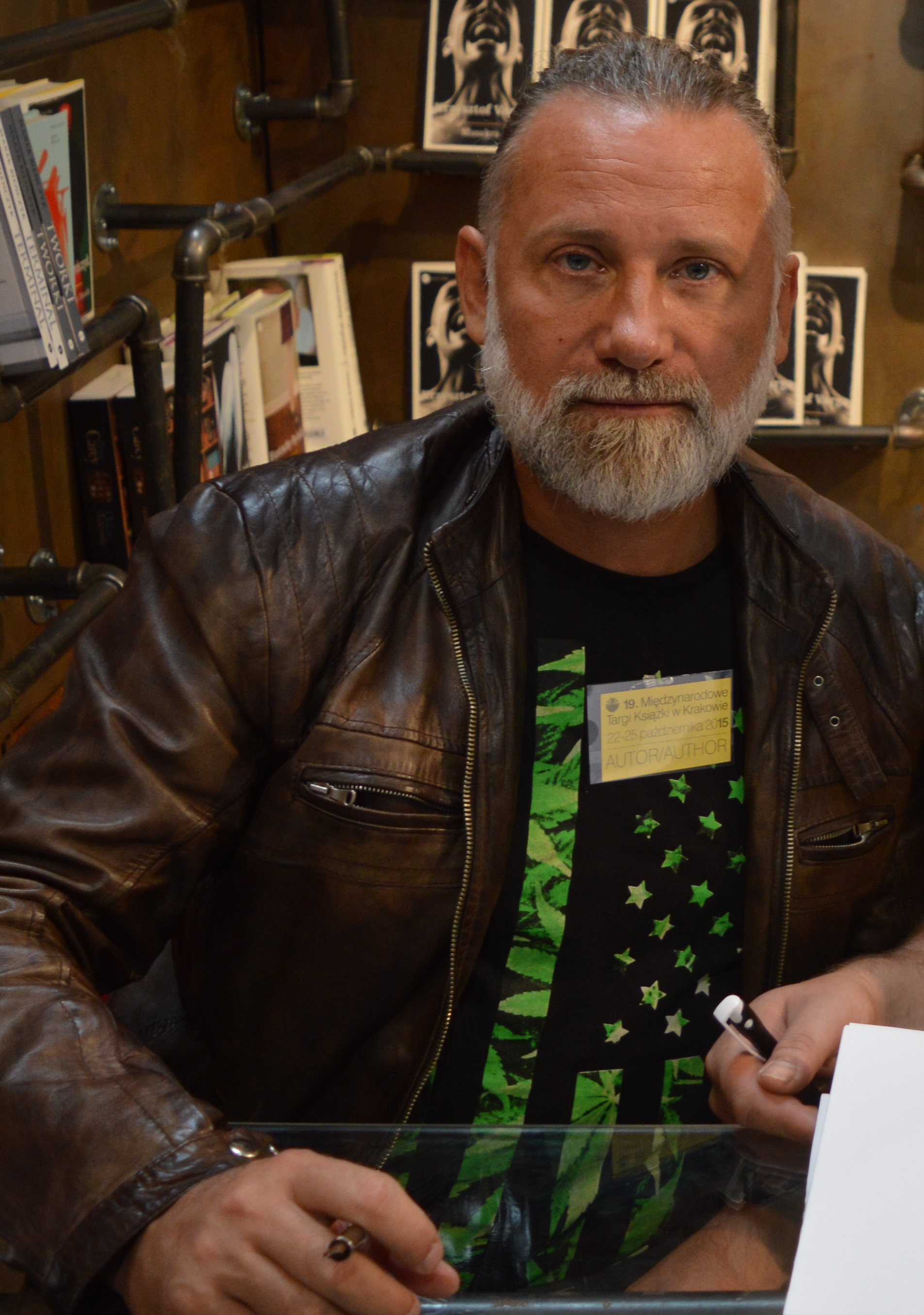
- Saramonowicz in 2015
- Born: February 23, 1965 (age 61); Warsaw, Poland
- Occupations: Film director, producer, screenwriter
- Notable work: Testosteron, Lejdis

Andrzej Bogdan Saramonowicz (born 23 February 1965 in Warsaw) is a Polish director, actor, journalist, screenwriter and playwright. Saramonowicz studied history at University of Warsaw before turning to journalism. He collaborated with some of the main Polish mainstream magazines, such as Gazeta Wyborcza, Viva and Przekrój. In 2000, his first screenplay and movie Pół serio ("Half seriously") won him the main award at the 2000 edition of the Festival of Polish Fiction Movies in Gdynia and kickstarted his career as a filmmaker. He then went on to write, produce and direct some of the biggest commercial successes of Polish cinema in the last decade. His comedies Testosteron, Lejdis and Idealny facet dla mojej dziewczyny alone totaled 4.6 million viewers, approximately a quarter of all tickets sold in that period.

== Early works ==
After the unexpected success of "Pół serio (based on the eponymous cultural TV programme) Saramonowicz went on to write the now-cult theater play Testosteron, which would hit stages nationwide and abroad (notably in the UK, Turkey, Czech Republic, Bulgaria...). In 2003 came out the black comedy Ciało, which he made in collaboration with Tomasz Konecki. Ciało, a critical and commercial success, was awarded the Złota Kaczka (Gold Duck) for best Polish movie at the Film Magazine award ceremony.

== Mainstream success ==
In 2007, the film adaptation of Saramonowicz's theater play Testosteron hit the big screens. With 1,4 million viewers, Testosteron was the first in a string of comedies that would renew the landscape of Polish humor - among which Lejdis (2007), Idealny facet dla mojej dziewczyny ("The Perfect Guy for My Girlfriend") (2009) and How to Get Rid of Cellulite (2011). The latter is the first in a two-film deal with Warner Bros. Polska as a part of their local language production strategy.

== Filmography ==
=== director ===
- Ciało (2003)
- Testosteron (2007)
- How to Get Rid of Cellulite (2011)
- Bejbis (2022)

=== screenwriter ===
- Rodziców nie ma w domu (1997-1998)
- 13 posterunek (1998)
- Pół serio (2000)
- Ciało (2003)
- Tango z aniołem (2005-2006)
- Testosteron (2007)
- Lejdis (2007)
- Idealny facet dla mojej dziewczyny (2009)
- Jak się pozbyć cellulitu (2011)
- Bejbis (2022)

=== producer ===
- Lejdis (2007)
- Idealny facet dla mojej dziewczyny (2009)
- Jak się pozbyć cellulitu (2011)
