= Testosterone (2007 film) =

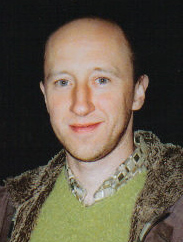
- Cezary Kosinski
- Directed by: Tomasz Konecki; Andrzej Saramonowicz
- Starring: Cezary Kosiński; Maciej Stuhr
- Release date: 2 March 2007
- Running time: 1h 59min
- Country: Poland
- Language: Polish
- Box office: $ 7 325 461

Testosterone (Polish: Testosteron) is a 2007 Polish comedy film directed by Tomasz Konecki and Andrzej Saramonowicz.

== Cast ==
- Cezary Kosiński − Janis
- Maciej Stuhr − Tretyn
- Tomasz Karolak − Fistach
- Piotr Adamczyk − Kornel
- Borys Szyc − Tytus
- Tomasz Kot − Robal
- Krzysztof Stelmaszyk − Stavros
