= Sebastian Konrad =

Polish actor

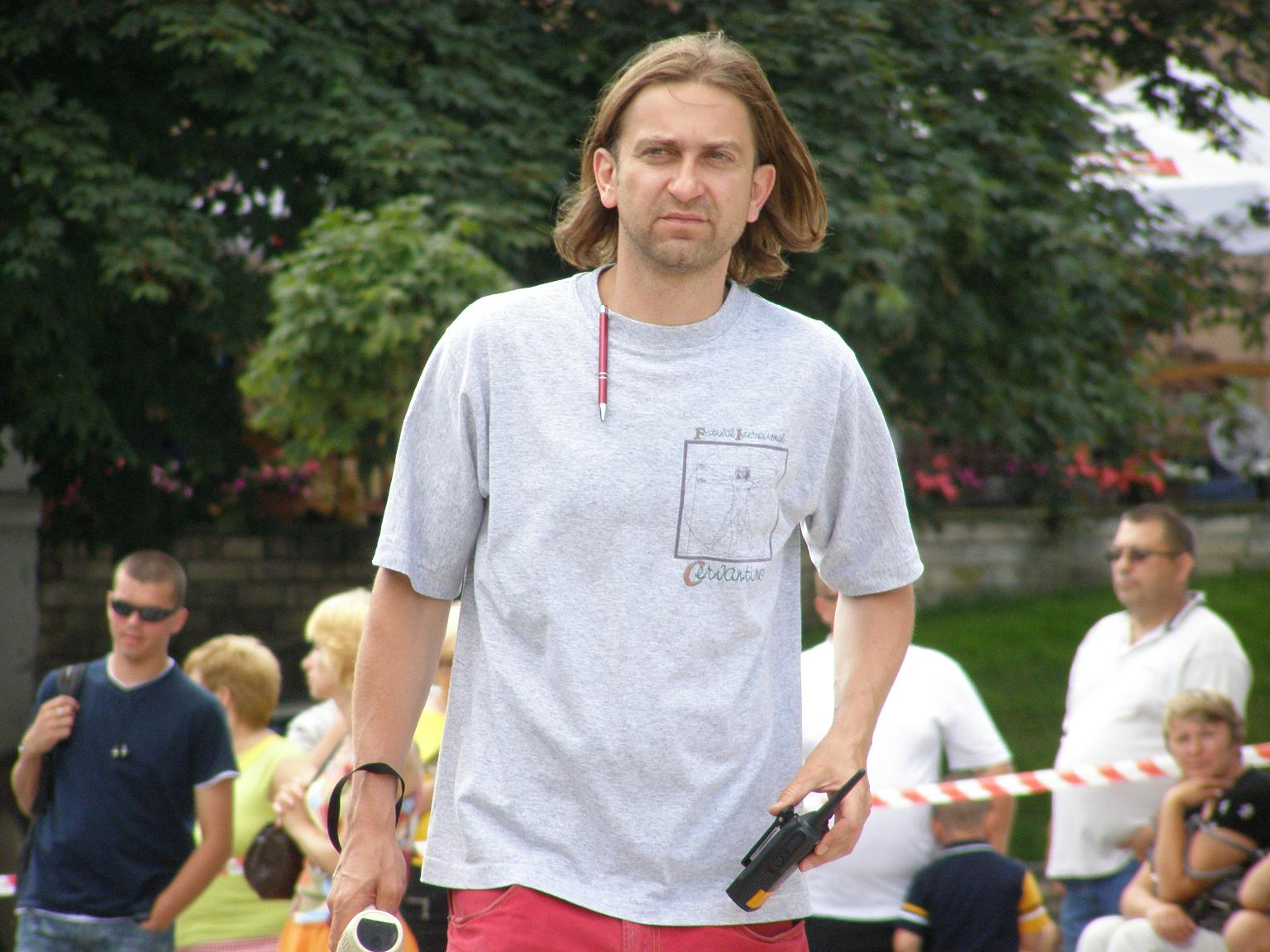

Sebastian Konrad (born 11 December 1971 in Oborniki) is a Polish actor. He appeared in the television series Aby do świtu... in 1992.

== Filmography ==
Year	Title	Role
1993	Schindler's List	Engineer Man
1996	Szamanka	Michal's friend
1997	Historie miłosne	Asystent na uczelni
1998	Spona	Watlusz
2006	Francuski numer	Adam
2008	Mała wielka miłość	Customs Officer
2011	Wyjazd integracyjny	Lyszczynski
2016	I'm a Killer	Bicycle Man
