= Maja Hirsch =

Polish actress (born 1977)

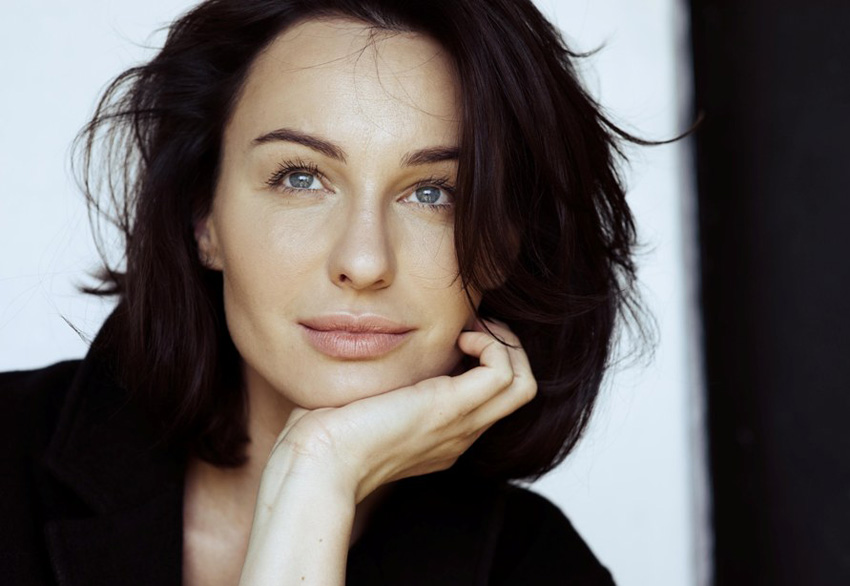
- Born: 1977; Warsaw, Poland
- Occupation: actress

Maja Hirsch (born in 1977 in Warsaw) is a Polish actress.

== Biography ==
She was born to Russian mother and Polish father with German roots.

Hirsch graduated from Aleksander Zelwerowicz State Theatre Academy in Warsaw. She debuted during her studies, in 1998 at the Studio Teatralne KOŁO. Since 2000 Maja Hirsch has been connected with the Gustaw Holoubek State Drama Theatre in Warsaw, and she also performed at the Syrena Theatre in 2005.

== Filmography ==
- 2000 - Dom
- 2000 - Lokatorzy as Jacek's girlfriend
- 2000 - Zaduszki narodowe as herself
- 2001-2010 - M jak miłość as Iza
- 2003 - Ciało as sister Morrison
- 2003 - Czarno to widzę as Zofia
- 2003 - Kasia i Tomek as lesbian girl
- 2003 - Miodowe lata
- 2003 - Spotkania
- 2004 - Bulionerzy as policeman
- 2004 - Zakręcone as Adam
- 2006 - Pogoda na piątek as Ada Kaczmarczyk
- 2007 - Świadek koronny as Iza
- 2007 - Prawo miasta as Mutra
- 2008-2009 - BrzydUla as Paulina Febo
- 2009 - Apetyt na życie as Julia Mikas
- 2010 - Ojciec Mateusz as Agata
- 2011 - How to Get Rid of Cellulite as Maja Minorska
- 2011 - Ki as Kaja
- 2011 - Wiadomości z drugiej ręki as Magda Szwed
- 2011 - Wszyscy kochają Romana as Nina Serafin
- 2012 - Prawo Agaty as Justyna Nałęcz
- 2012 - Na krawędzi as Tamara Madejska
- 2014 - Komisarz Alex as Wanda Gandecka
- 2014 - Na krawędzi 2 as Tamara Madejska
- 2015 - Ojciec Mateusz as Bożena Dembińska
- 2016 - Bodo as Barbara Drewiczówna
- 2017 - DJ as Maja
- 2017 - O mnie się nie martw as Wanda Izdebska
- 2018 - Trzecia połowa as Adela
- 2019 - Zakochani po uszy as Elwira Witos, matka Sylwii
