= Katarzyna Ankudowicz =

Polish actress

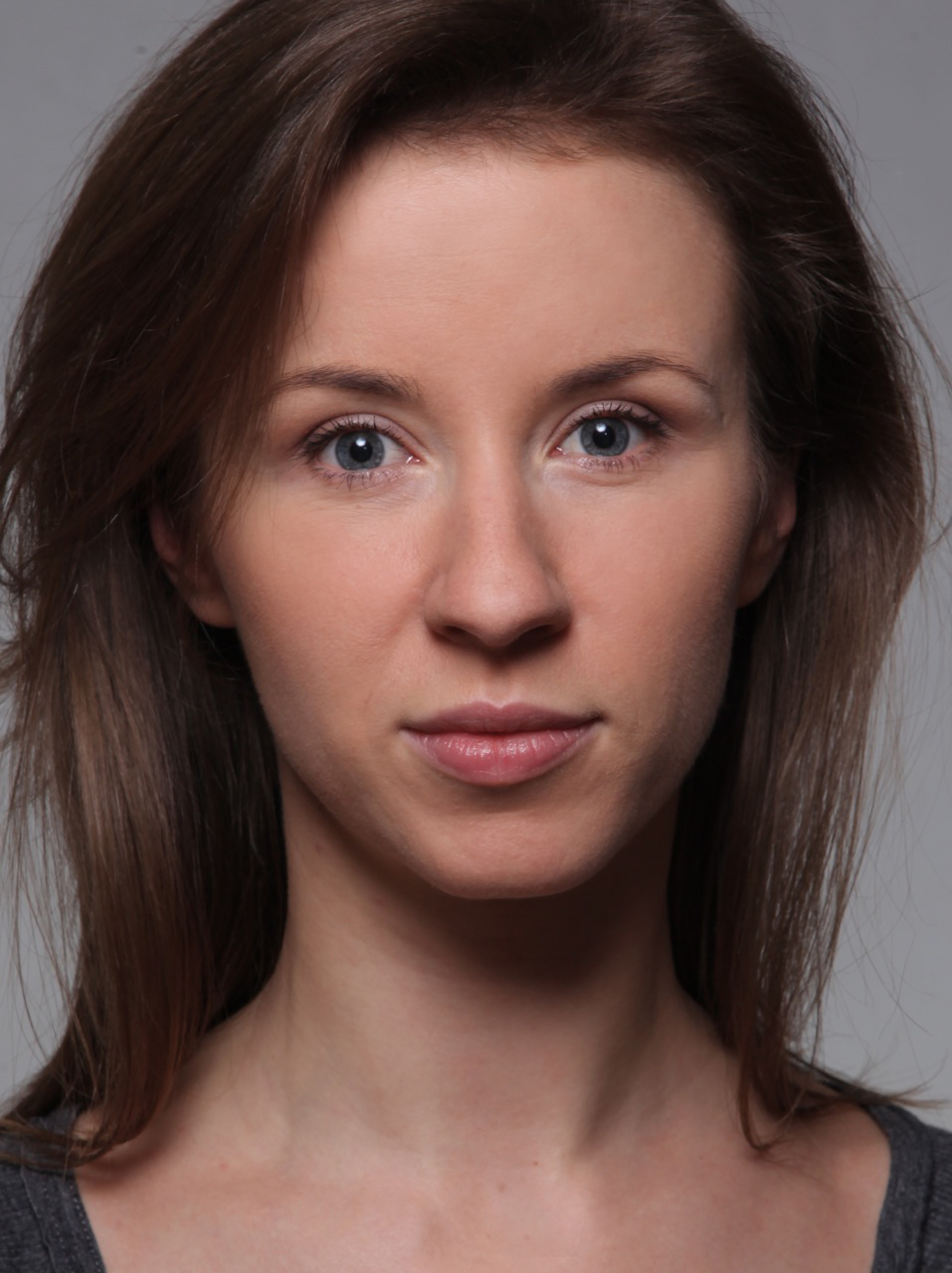
- Ankudowicz circa 2010
- Born: 3 June 1981 (age 44); Morąg, Poland
- Occupation: Actress
- Years active: 2004–present

Katarzyna Ankudowicz (born 3 June 1981) is a Polish actress. She graduated from the Aleksander Zelwerowicz State Theatre Academy in 2004.

== Filmography ==
- 2004-2006: Bulionerzy
- 2004: Mało upalne lato
- 2005: Szaleńcy
- 2006-2007: Pogoda na piątek
- 2007: Mamuśki
- since 2013: Pierwsza miłość
- 2013: Walesa: Man of Hope
- 2017: Gotowi na wszystko. Exterminator
- 2021: Friends
