= Cezary Kosiński =

Polish actor

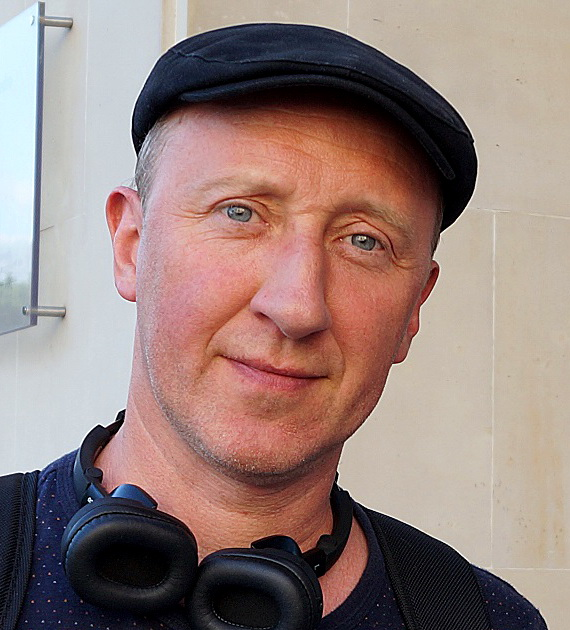
- Cezary Kosiński, 2018
- Born: 8 April 1973 (age 53); Bielsk Podlaski, Poland
- Occupation: Actor
- Years active: 1997-present

Cezary Kosiński (born 8 April 1973) is a Polish actor. He has appeared in more than forty films since 1997.

== Selected filmography ==
| Year | Title | Role |
|---|---|---|
| 1999 | The Debt | Tadeusz Frei |
| 1999 | Pan Tadeusz | |
| 2002 | The Pianist | Lednicki |
| 2007 | Testosterone | Janis |
| 2009 | Zero | |
| 2013 | Walesa. Man of Hope | Majchrzak |
| 2014 | Gods | Roman Włodarski |
| 2021 | Klangor | Jerzy Majchrzak |
| 2021 | The Defence | Judge Tatarek |
