= Krzysztof Stelmaszyk =

Polish film and television actor

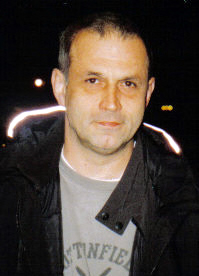
- Born: 2 March 1959 (age 67); Warsaw, Poland

Krzysztof Stelmaszyk (born 2 March 1959) is a Polish film and television actor.

== Filmography ==
- By Touch (1986) as Adam
- Batman: Mask of the Phantasm (1993; theatrical film) - Batman (Polish dubbing)
- Złotopolscy (1998–2002; 2004-) as Jerzy Wons
- Bulionerzy (2004) as Karol Murawski
- Tango z aniołem (2005) as Krzysztof Traczynski
- Magda M. (2005–2007) as Wiktor Waligóra
- Statyści (2006) as Ochman
- Testosterone (2007) as Stavros
- The Avengers (2012) as Nick Fury (Polish dubbing)
