= Małgorzata Buczkowska =

Polish actress (born 1976)

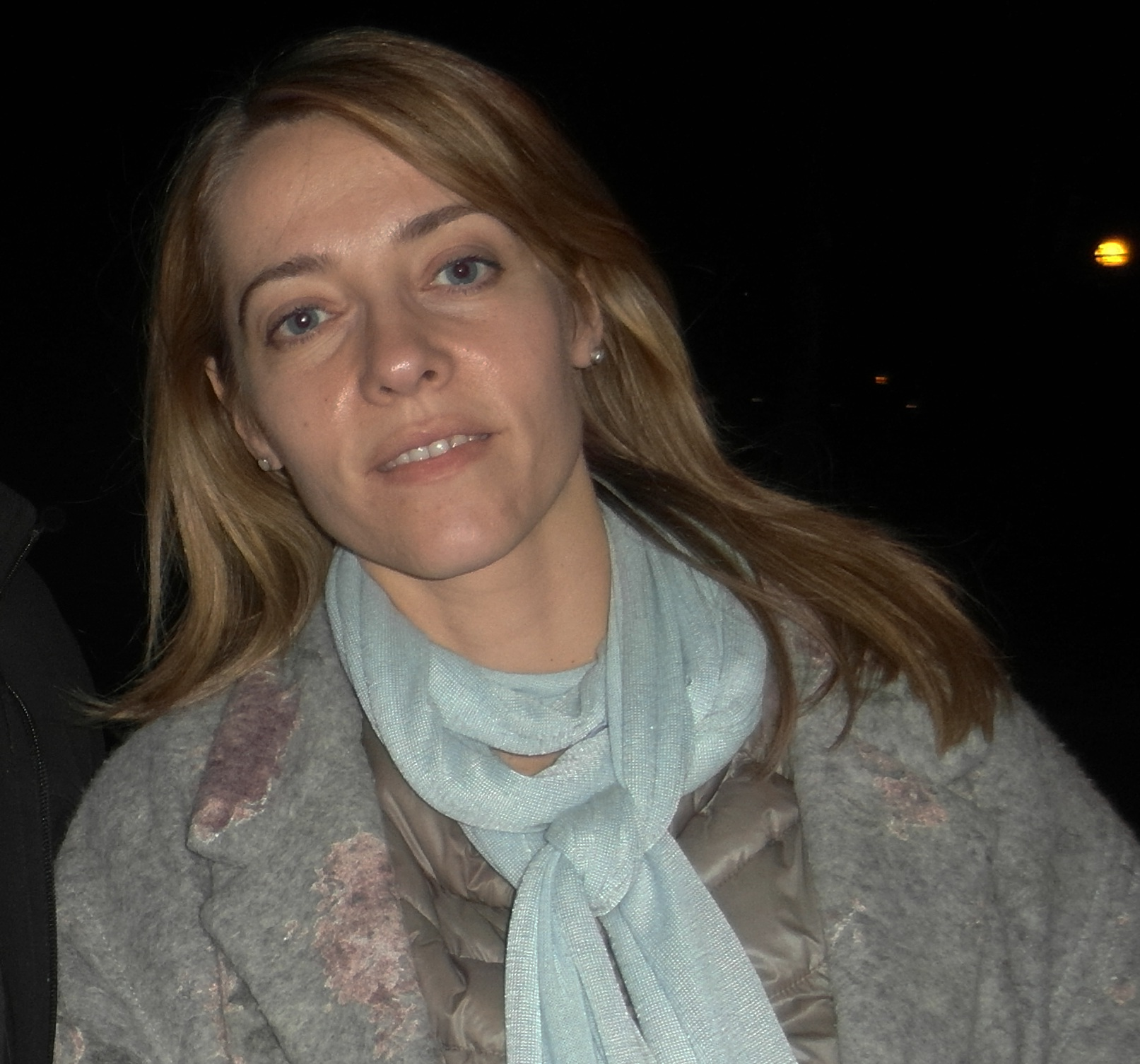
Małgorzata Buczkowska in 2015

Małgorzata Buczkowska (born 25 August 1976, in Lublin) is a Polish film and stage actress, best known outside Poland for her leading role in Zasada przyjemnosci. (The Principle of Pleasure, Géométrie de la mort, etc.)

She was awarded the Zlota Maska (Golden Mask) award several times (2004, 2005, 2007), twice nominated for the Zbyszek Cybulski Award (2008, 2009), and had a number of other distinctions.
