= Andrzej Pieczyński =

Polish actor (born 1956)

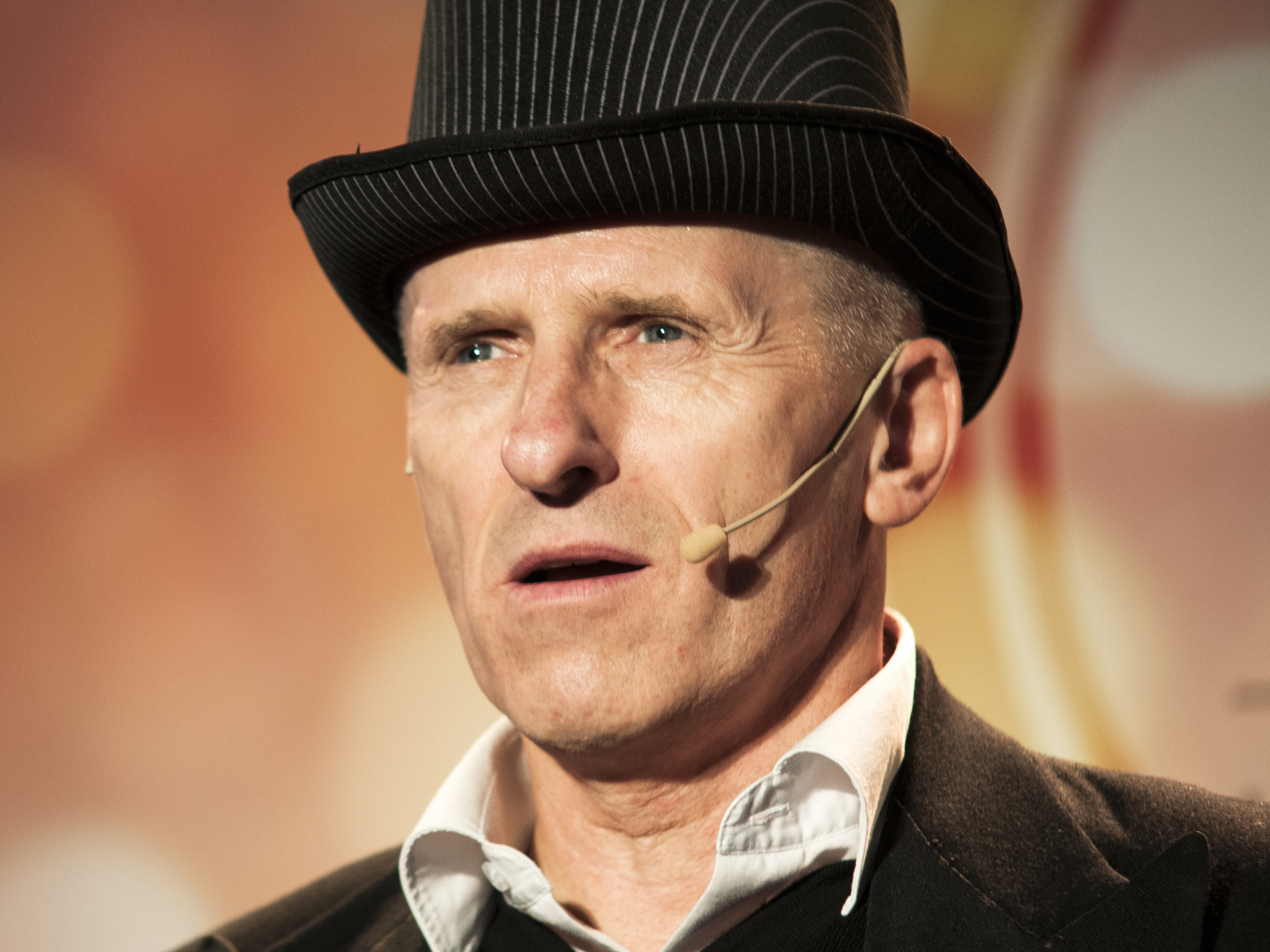
- Andrzej Pieczyński (2014)
- Born: 17 December 1956 (age 68); Pobiedziska, Poland

Andrzej Pieczyński (born 17 December 1956) is a Polish actor. In 2003, he starred in the film An Ancient Tale: When the Sun Was a God under Jerzy Hoffman.

He is the ex-husband of actress Małgorzata Pieczyńska.
