= Małgorzata Pieczyńska =

Polish actress (born 1960)

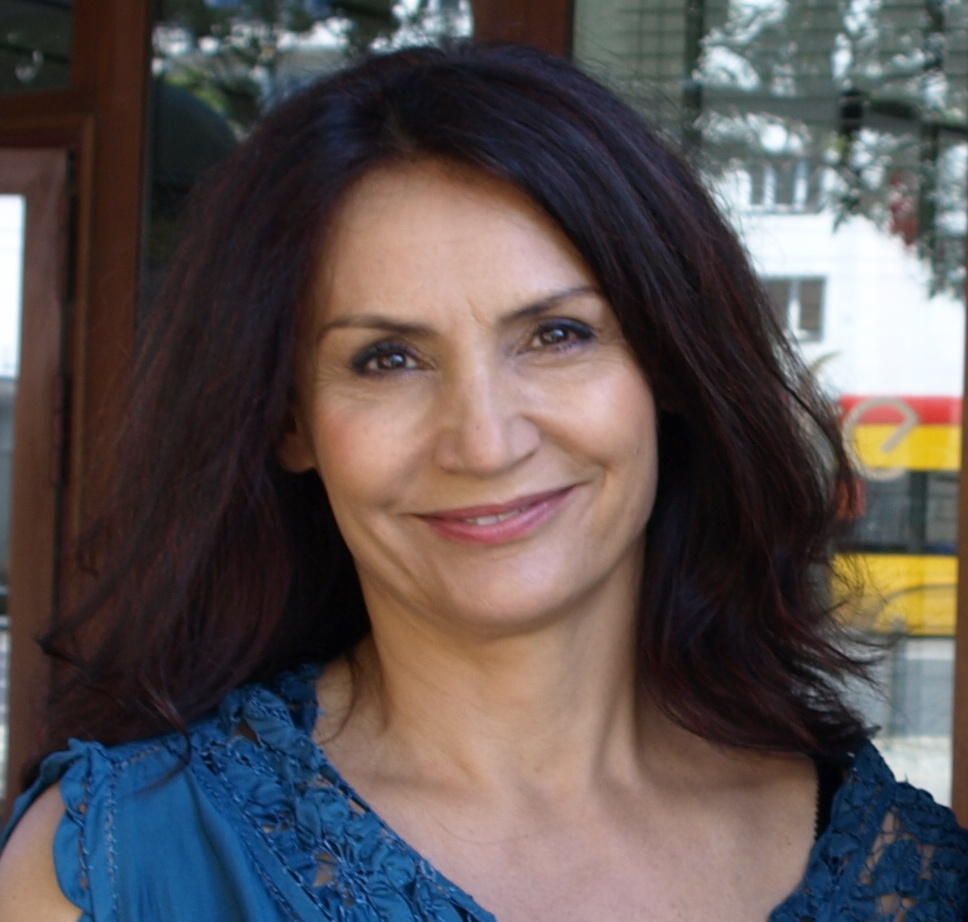
- Pieczyńska in 2014
- Born: Małgorzata Maciejewska; 4 May 1960 (age 65); Warsaw, Poland
- Occupation: Actress
- Spouse: Andrzej Pieczyński (divorced)

Małgorzata Pieczyńska (née Maciejewska) (born 4 May 1960) is a Polish film and television actress. She portrayed forensic scientist Nadja on Bäckström across three seasons in 2020, 2022 and 2024.

== Personal life ==
Pieczyńska was born in Warsaw. Her first husband was a fellow actor Andrzej Pieczyński. After they divorced, she married Gabriel Wróblewski, with whom she emigrated to Sweden in late 1980s. They have a son Wiktor, and live in Stockholm. She is fluent in Polish and Swedish, and also speaks Russian and French.
