= Taniec z gwiazdami season 19 =

Taniec z gwiazdami
- Season 19
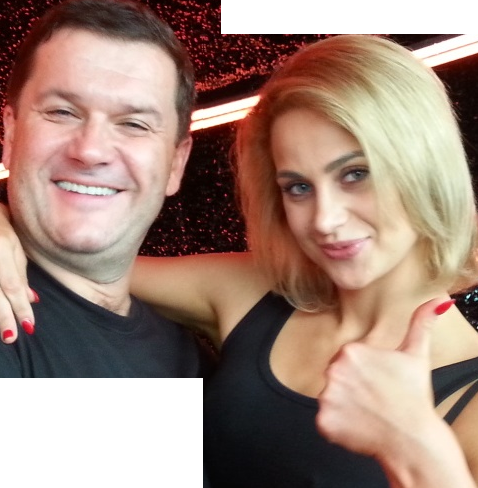
- Robert Wabich i Hanna Żudziewicz, winners of the season
- Hosted by: Krzysztof Ibisz; Paulina Sykut-Jeżyna
- Judges: Andrzej Grabowski; Iwona Pavlović; Beata Tyszkiewicz; Michał Malitowski
- Celebrity winner: Robert Wabich
- Professional winner: Hanna Żudziewicz
- No. of episodes: 10

Release
- Original network: Polsat
- Original release: 2 September – 4 November 2016

Season chronology
- ← Previous; Season 18 Next → Season 20

The 19th season of Taniec z gwiazdami, the Polish edition of Dancing With the Stars, started on 2 September 2016. This is the sixth season aired on Polsat. Krzysztof Ibisz and Paulina Sykut-Jeżyna returned as hosts and Beata Tyszkiewicz, Iwona Pavlović, Michał Malitowski and Andrzej Grabowski returned as judges.

On 4 November, Robert Wabich and his partner Hanna Żudziewicz were crowned the champions.

== Couples ==
Celebrity	Occupation	Professional partner	Status
Tomasz Ciachorowski	Film and television actor	Natalia Głębocka	Eliminated 1st on 2 September 2016
Karolina Gorczyca	Film and television actress	Żora Korolyov †	Eliminated 2nd on 9 September 2016
Kamil Mokrzycki	Sound'n'Grace singer	Valeriya Zhuravlyova	Eliminated 3rd on 16 September 2016
Mariola Bojarska-Ferenc	Artistic gymnast and television presenter	Tomasz Barański	Eliminated 4th on 23 September 2016
Sławomir	Actor, singer & television presenter	Magdalena Molęda	Eliminated 5th on 30 September 2016
Urszula Dębska	Pierwsza miłość actress	Wojciech Jeschke	Eliminated 6th on 7 October 2016
Ewa Błachnio	Comedian	Jacek Jeschke	Eliminated 7th on 14 October 2016
Adam Zdrójkowski	Rodzinka.pl actor and television presenter	Wiktoria Omyła	Eliminated 8th on 21 October 2016
Misheel Jargalsaikhan	Rodzina zastępcza actress	Jan Kliment	Third place on 28 October 2016
Olga Kalicka	Film and television actress	Rafał Maserak	Runners-up on 4 November 2016
Robert Wabich	Film and television actor	Hanna Żudziewicz	Winners on 4 November 2016

== Scores ==
Couple	Place	1	2	3	4	5	6	7	8	9		10
Robert & Hanna	1	33	30	37†	30+2=32	38†	35+38=73	40+37=77	40+35+37=112	40+38=78	+40=118†	38+40+40=118‡
Olga & Rafał	2	36†	37†	37†	37†	38†	35+35=70	38+40=78†	40+37+38=115†	39+40=79†	—	39+40+40=119†
Misheel & Jan	3	29	35	31	25	33	33+33=66‡	34+30=64	34+32+37=103	35+37=72‡	+37=109‡	
Adam & Wiktoria	4	24‡	27	28	22+2=24‡	33	31+35=66‡	26+29=55‡	32+32+38=102‡			
Ewa & Jacek	5	32	28	36	31	38†	39+38=77†	31+33=64				
Urszula & Wojciech	6	32	28	33	33	35	34+33=67					
Sławomir & Magdalena	7	30	18‡	20‡	32+2=34	27‡						
Mariola & Tomasz	8	31	32	29	31							
Kamil & Valeriya	9	28	22	25								
Karolina & Żora	10	31	26									
Tomasz & Natalia	11	24‡										

Red numbers indicate the lowest score for each week.
Green numbers indicate the highest score for each week.
indicates the couple eliminated that week.
indicates the returning couple that finished in the bottom two or three.
indicates the couple saved from elimination by immunity.
indicates the winning couple.
indicates the runner-up.
indicates the couple in third place.

== Average score chart ==
This table only counts for dances scored on a traditional 40-points scale.

Rank by average	Place	Couple	Total points	Number of dances	Average
1	2	Olga & Rafał	646	17	38.0
2	1	Robert & Hanna	666	18	37.0
3	5	Ewa & Jacek	306	9	34.0
4	3	Misheel & Jan	495	15	33.0
5	6	Urszula & Wojciech	228	7	32.6
6	8	Mariola & Tomasz	123	4	30.8
7	4	Adam & Wiktoria	357	12	29.8
8	10	Karolina & Żora	57	2	28.5
9	7	Sławomir & Magdalena	127	5	25.4
10	9	Kamil & Valeriya	75	3	25.0
11	11	Tomasz & Natalia	24	1	24.0

== Highest and lowest scoring performances ==
The best and worst performances in each dance according to the judges' 40-point scale are as follows:

Dance	Best dancer(s)	Highest score	Worst dancer(s)	Lowest score
Waltz	Robert Wabich	40	Tomasz Ciachorowski	24
Jive	Robert Wabich	38	Adam Zdrójkowski	24
Tango	Robert Wabich	40	Kamil Mokrzycki	22
Cha-cha-cha	Olga Kalicka; Robert Wabich	37	Sławomir Zapała	20
Jazz	Olga Kalicka	40	Olga Kalicka	37
Viennese Waltz	Olga Kalicka	39	Sławomir Zapała	18
Samba	Olga Kalicka	38	Adam Zdrójkowski	22
Foxtrot	Robert Wabich	40	Misheel Jargalsaikhan	30
Lambada	Olga Kalicka	37		
Salsa	Olga Kalicka	39	Mariola Bojarska-Ferenc	29
Rumba	Olga Kalicka	40	Robert Wabich	30
Contemporary	Ewa Błachnio; Urszula Dębska; Misheel Jargalsaikhan	33	Ewa Błachnio; Adam Zdrójkowski	31
Paso Doble	Misheel Jargalsaikhan	34	Sławomir Zapała	32
Quickstep	Robert Wabich	38	Adam Zdrójkowski	26
Charleston	Adam Zdrójkowski	32		
Argentine Tango	Olga Kalicka	40		
Bollywood Group	Olga Kalicka; Adam Zdrójkowski	38	Misheel Jargalsaikhan; Robert Wabich	37
Freestyle	Olga Kalicka; Robert Wabich	40		

== Couples' highest and lowest scoring dances ==
According to the traditional 40-point scale:

Couples	Highest scoring dance(s)	Lowest scoring dance(s)
Robert & Hanna	Foxtrot (twice), Waltz (twice), Tango, Freestyle (40)	Cha-cha-cha, Rumba (30)
Olga & Rafał	Jazz, Argentine Tango (twice), Rumba, Freestyle (40)	Viennese Waltz, Jive (35)
Misheel & Jan	Bollywood, Viennese Waltz, Tango (37)	Jive (25)
Adam & Wiktoria	Bollywood (38)	Samba (22)
Ewa & Jacek	Waltz (39)	Cha-cha-cha (28)
Urszula & Wojciech	Samba (35)	Jive (28)
Sławomir & Magdalena	Paso Doble (32)	Viennese Waltz (18)
Mariola & Tomasz	Waltz (32)	Salsa (29)
Kamil & Valeriya	Jive (28)	Tango (22)
Karolina & Żora	Waltz (31)	Cha-cha-cha (26)
Tomasz & Natalia	Waltz (24)	Waltz (24)

== Weekly scores ==
Unless indicated otherwise, individual judges scores in the charts below (given in parentheses) are listed in this order from left to right: Iwona Pavlović, Andrzej Grabowski, Beata Tyszkiewicz and Michał Malitowski.

=== Week 1: Season Premiere ===
Running order

Couple	Score	Dance	Music	Result
Karolina & Żora	31 (7,9,9,6)	Waltz	"(You Make Me Feel Like) A Natural Woman"—Aretha Franklin	Safe
Adam & Wiktoria	24 (4,7,9,4)	Jive	"I'm a Believer"—Smash Mouth	Safe
Ewa & Jacek	32 (7,9,9,7)	Tango	"Somebody That I Used to Know"—Gotye featuring Kimbra	Safe
Olga & Rafał	36 (9,10,10,7)	Cha-cha-cha	"It's Raining Men"—Geri Halliwell	Safe
Tomasz & Natalia	24 (3,8,10,3)	Waltz	"Someone Like You"—Adele	Eliminated
Mariola & Tomasz	31 (7,9,9,6)	Cha-cha-cha	"Sway"—Dean Martin	Safe
Sławomir & Magdalena	30 (6,8,10,6)	Jive	"Mambo No. 5"—Lou Bega	Safe
Urszula & Wojciech	32 (7,10,9,6)	Tango	"Santa Maria (Del Buen Ayre)"—Gotan Project	Safe
Robert & Hanna	33 (8,10,9,6)	Waltz	"Are You Lonesome Tonight?"—Elvis Presley	Safe
Misheel & Jan	29 (6,9,9,5)	Cha-cha-cha	"Only Girl (In the World)"—Rihanna	Safe
Kamil & Valeriya	28 (5,8,9,6)	Jive	"Lustra"—Natalia Szroeder	Bottom two

=== Week 2 ===
Running order

Couple	Score	Dance	Music	Result
Urszula & Wojciech	28 (6,8,9,5)	Jive	"Proud Mary"—Tina Turner	Bottom two
Olga & Rafał	37 (10,10,10,7)	Jazz	"All of Me"—John Legend	Safe
Karolina & Żora	26 (6,8,8,4)	Cha-cha-cha	"Corazón Espinado"—Santana featuring Maná	Eliminated
Sławomir & Magdalena	18 (3,6,7,2)	Viennese Waltz	"Still Loving You"—Scorpions	Safe
Kamil & Valeriya	22 (4,7,8,3)	Tango	"Rolling in the Deep"—Adele	Safe
Ewa & Jacek	28 (5,9,10,4)	Cha-cha-cha	"She Bangs"—Ricky Martin	Safe
Adam & Wiktoria	27 (5,8,9,5)	Viennese Waltz	"Chodź, przytul, przebacz"—Andrzej Piaseczny	Safe
Misheel & Jan	35 (9,10,10,6)	Tango	"Voulez-Vous"—ABBA	Safe
Robert & Hanna	30 (7,9,8,6)	Cha-cha-cha	"Night Fever"—Bee Gees	Safe
Mariola & Tomasz	32 (8,9,9,6)	Waltz	"I Will Always Love You"—Whitney Houston	Safe

=== Week 3: Summer Jams ===
Running order

Couple	Score	Dance	Music	Result
Misheel & Jan	31 (7,10,9,5)	Samba	"Waka Waka (This Time for Africa)"—Shakira	Safe
Adam & Wiktoria	28 (6,9,9,4)	Cha-cha-cha	"Na chwilę"—Grzegorz Hyży & TABB	Safe
Ewa & Jacek	36 (9,10,10,7)	Foxtrot	"Na jednej z dzikich plaż"—Rotary	Safe
Olga & Rafał	37 (10,10,10,7)	Lambada	"Lambada"—Kaoma	Safe
Kamil & Valeriya	25 (5,8,8,4)	Samba	"Tak blisko"—Rafał Brzozowski	Eliminated
Mariola & Tomasz	29 (4,9,9,7)	Salsa	"La Isla Bonita"—Madonna	Bottom two
Robert & Hanna	37 (9,10,10,8)	Tango	"Tamta dziewczyna"—Sylwia Grzeszczak	Safe
Urszula & Wojciech	33 (8,10,9,6)	Rumba	"Naucz mnie"—Sarsa	Safe
Sławomir & Magdalena	20 (2,7,8,3)	Cha-cha-cha	"Dziewczyny lubią brąz"—Ryszard Rynkowski	Safe

=== Week 4: Music Icons ===
Running order

Couple	Score	Dance	Music	Result
Olga & Rafał	37 (9,10,10,8)	Jive	"She Loves You"—The Beatles	Safe
Urszula & Wojciech	33 (8,9,10,6)	Contemporary	"Hello"—Adele	Safe
Adam & Wiktoria	22 (3,7,8,4)	Samba	"Sorry"—Justin Bieber	Safe
Mariola & Tomasz	31 (7,9,9,6)	Foxtrot	"Theme from New York, New York"—Frank Sinatra	Eliminated
Sławomir & Magdalena	32 (10,9,9,4)	Paso Doble	"Dirty Diana"—Michael Jackson	Safe
Misheel & Jan	25 (4,10,8,3)	Jive	"Single Ladies (Put a Ring on It)"—Beyoncé	Bottom two
Robert & Hanna	30 (6,9,8,7)	Rumba	"I Don't Wanna Lose You"—Tina Turner	Safe
Ewa & Jacek	31 (5,10,10,6)	Contemporary	"The Show Must Go On"—Queen	Safe
Adam; Jacek; Rafał; Tomasz; Sławomir; Wojciech; Robert; Jan	2 (Yes,No,Yes,Yes)	Freestyle (Boys Group)	"I Got You (I Feel Good)"—James Brown	
Wiktoria; Ewa; Olga; Mariola; Magdalena; Urszula; Hanna; Misheel	0 (No,Yes,No,No)	Freestyle (Girls Group)	"Ain't Your Mama"—Jennifer Lopez	

=== Week 5: Disney Night ===
Running order

Couple	Score	Dance	Music	Animated film	Result
Sławomir & Magdalena	27 (5,9,9,4)	Quickstep	"Pszczółka Maja"—Zbigniew Wodecki	Maya the Honey Bee	Eliminated
Ewa & Jacek	38 (10,10,10,8)	Viennese Waltz	"A Dream Is a Wish Your Heart Makes"	Cinderella	Bottom three
Adam & Wiktoria	33 (6,8,9,10)	Foxtrot	"You've Got a Friend in Me"	Toy Story	Bottom three
Urszula & Wojciech	35 (8,10,10,7)	Samba	"Under the Sea"—Samuel E. Wright	The Little Mermaid	Safe
Misheel & Jan	33 (7,10,10,6)	Rumba	"Kolorowy wiatr"—Edyta Górniak	Pocahontas	Safe
Robert & Hanna	38 (9,10,10,9)	Quickstep	"(Meet) The Flintstones"—The B-52's	The Flintstones	Safe
Olga & Rafał	38 (10,10,10,8)	Waltz	"Beauty and the Beast"	Beauty and the Beast	Safe

=== Week 6: Dedications Night ===
Running order

Couple	Score	Dance	Music	Result
Robert & Hanna	35 (9,10,9,7)	Viennese Waltz	"When a Man Loves a Woman"—Percy Sledge	Safe
Misheel & Jan	33 (6,10,9,8)	Contemporary	"Make You Feel My Love"—Adele	Bottom two
Urszula & Wojciech	34 (7,10,10,7)	Viennese Waltz	"Od nocy do nocy"—Halina Kunicka	Eliminated
Ewa & Jacek	39 (10,10,10,9)	Waltz	"Idź swoją drogą"—Raz Dwa Trzy	Safe
Olga & Rafał	35 (8,10,10,7)	Viennese Waltz	"The Greatest Love of All"—Whitney Houston	Safe
Adam & Wiktoria	31 (5,10,9,7)	Contemporary	"(Everything I Do) I Do It for You"—Bryan Adams	Safe
Urszula & Misheel	33 (7,9,9,8)	Samba	"Copacabana"—Barry Manilow	
Ewa & Robert	38 (9,10,10,9)	Tango	"Don't Be So Shy"—Imany	
Olga & Adam	35 (8,9,9,9)	Jive	"Stitches"—Shawn Mendes	

=== Week 7: Radio Hits ===
Running order

Couple	Score	Dance	Music	Result
Ewa & Jacek	31 (6,9,9,7)	Jive	"Waiting All Night"—Rudimental featuring Ella Eyre	Eliminated
Ewa & Jacek	33 (8,9,9,7)	Contemporary	"Pod wiatr"—Grzegorz Hyży	Eliminated
Misheel & Jan	34 (8,9,9,8)	Cha-cha-cha	"Milion słów"—Jula	Safe
Misheel & Jan	30 (6,9,9,6)	Foxtrot	"7 Years"—Lukas Graham	Safe
Robert & Hanna	40 (10,10,10,10)	Foxtrot	"Lost on You"—LP	Safe
Robert & Hanna	37 (8,10,10,9)	Cha-cha-cha	"Ty i ja"—Monika Lewczuk	Safe
Olga & Rafał	38 (9,10,10,9)	Samba	"Prosta sprawa"—Ewelina Lisowska	Safe
Olga & Rafał	40 (10,10,10,10)	Jazz	"If I Were Sorry"—Frans	Safe
Adam & Wiktoria	26 (4,8,8,6)	Quickstep	"Lush Life"—Zara Larsson	Bottom two
Adam & Wiktoria	29 (5,9,8,7)	Cha-cha-cha	"Z całych sił"—Szymon Chodyniecki	Bottom two

=== Week 8: Trio Challenge ===
Running order

Couple	Score	Dance	Music	Result
Adam & Wiktoria (Agnieszka Kaczorowska)	32 (6,9,10,7)	Charleston	"Puttin' on the Ritz"—Fred Astaire	Eliminated
Adam & Wiktoria (Agnieszka Kaczorowska)	32 (7,9,9,7)	Viennese Waltz	"Say You Love Me"—Jessie Ware	Eliminated
Olga & Rafał (Stefano Terrazzino)	40 (10,10,10,10)	Argentine Tango	"Telephone"—Lady Gaga featuring Beyoncé (Instrumental)	Safe
Olga & Rafał (Stefano Terrazzino)	37 (9,10,10,8)	Cha-cha-cha	"Rather Be"—Clean Bandit featuring Jess Glynne	Safe
Robert & Hanna (Valeriya Zhuravlyova)	40 (10,10,10,10)	Waltz	"What the World Needs Now Is Love"—Jackie DeShannon	Safe
Robert & Hanna (Valeriya Zhuravlyova)	35 (8,10,9,8)	Samba	"La Pantera Mambo"—Orquesta La 33	Safe
Misheel & Jan (Tomasz Barański)	34 (7,10,10,7)	Paso Doble	"Torn"—Nathan Lanier	Safe
Misheel & Jan (Tomasz Barański)	32 (5,10,10,7)	Jive	"Nobody to Love"—Sigma	Safe
Olga & Rafał; Adam & Wiktoria	38 (10,10,9,9)	Bollywood	"Mast kalandar" from Heyy Babyy	
Misheel & Jan; Robert & Hanna	37 (9,10,9,9)	Bollywood	"Ooh La La Tu Hai Meri Fantasy" from The Dirty Picture	

=== Week 9: My Favorite Place (Semi-final) ===
Running order

Couple	Score	Dance	Music	Result
Olga & Rafał	39 (10,10,10,9)	Salsa	"Duele El Corazon"—Enrique Iglesias featuring Wisin	Safe
Olga & Rafał	40 (10,10,10,10)	Rumba	"Shape of My Heart"—Sting	Safe
Robert & Hanna	40 (10,10,10,10)	Foxtrot	"Badaboum"—Hooverphonic	Bottom two
Robert & Hanna	38 (9,10,10,9)	Jive	"Shake a Tail Feather"—The Blues Brothers	Bottom two
Misheel & Jan	35 (7,10,10,8)	Salsa	"El mismo sol"—Álvaro Soler	Bottom two
Misheel & Jan	37 (8,10,10,9)	Viennese Waltz	"Earned It"—The Weeknd	Bottom two

Dance-off

Running order

Couple	Score	Dance	Music	Result
Robert & Hanna	40 (10,10,10,10)	Tango	"Tamta dziewczyna"—Sylwia Grzeszczak	Safe
Misheel & Jan	37 (8,10,10,9)	Tango	"Voulez-Vous"—ABBA	Eliminated

=== Week 10: Season Finale ===
Running order

Couple	Score	Dance	Music	Result
Olga & Rafał	39 (10,10,10,9)	Viennese Waltz	"The Greatest Love of All"—Whitney Houston	Runners-up
Olga & Rafał	40 (10,10,10,10)	Freestyle	"The Sound of Silence"—Simon & Garfunkel	Runners-up
Olga & Rafał	40 (10,10,10,10)	Argentine Tango	"Telephone"—Lady Gaga featuring Beyoncé (Instrumental)	Runners-up
Robert & Hanna	38 (9,10,10,9)	Rumba	"I Don't Wanna Lose You"—Tina Turner	Winners
Robert & Hanna	40 (10,10,10,10)	Freestyle	"Już taki jestem zimny drań"—Eugeniusz Bodo "Sex appeal"—Eugeniusz Bodo "Tango Milonga"—Mieczysław Fogg	Winners
Robert & Hanna	40 (10,10,10,10)	Waltz	"What the World Needs Now Is Love"—Jackie DeShannon	Winners

== Dance chart ==
The celebrities and professional partners danced one of these routines for each corresponding week:

- Week 1 (Season Premiere): Cha-cha-cha, Waltz, Jive, Tango
- Week 2: One unlearned dance (introducing Viennese Waltz, Jazz)
- Week 3 (The End of Summer): One unlearned dance (introducing Rumba, Foxtrot, Samba, Salsa, Lambada)
- Week 4 (Music Icons Week): One unlearned dance (introducing Paso Doble, Contemporary) and group dances (Freestyle)
- Week 5 (Animated Films Week): One unlearned dance (introducing Quickstep)
- Week 6 (Dedications Dances): One unlearned dance and one repeated dance
- Week 7 (Radio Hits): One unlearned dance and one repeated dance
- Week 8 (Trio Challenge): One unlearned dance (trio dances) and one repeated dance (introducing Argentine Tango, Charleston) and group dance (introducing Bollywood) (Note: Week 8: Robert & Hanna repeated dance as trio dances.)
- Week 9 (Semi-final: My Favorite Place): Two unlearned dances and dance-offs (Note: Week 9: Robert & Hanna one repeated dance and one unlearned dance.)
- Week 10 (Season Final): Rivals' choice and Freestyle and couple's favorite dance of the season

Couple	1	2	3	4		5	6		7		8			9			10		
Robert & Hanna	Waltz	Cha-cha-cha	Tango	Rumba	Freestyle (Group Boys)	Quickstep	Viennese Waltz	Tango (Ewa)	Foxtrot	Cha-cha-cha	Waltz	Samba	Bollywood (Misheel & Jan)	Foxtrot	Jive	Tango	Rumba	Freestyle	Waltz
Olga & Rafał	Cha-cha-cha	Jazz	Lambada	Jive	Freestyle (Group Girls)	Waltz	Viennese Waltz	Jive (Adam)	Samba	Jazz	Argentine Tango	Cha-cha-cha	Bollywood (Adam & Wiktoria)	Salsa	Rumba	- (Immunity)	Viennese Waltz	Freestyle	Argentine Tango
Misheel & Jan	Cha-cha-cha	Tango	Samba	Jive	Freestyle (Group Girls)	Rumba	Contemporary	Samba (Urszula)	Cha-cha-cha	Foxtrot	Paso Doble	Jive	Bollywood (Robert & Hanna)	Salsa	Viennese Waltz	Tango			Viennese Waltz
Adam & Wiktoria	Jive	Viennese Waltz	Cha-cha-cha	Samba	Freestyle (Group Boys)	Foxtrot	Contemporary	Jive (Olga)	Quickstep	Cha-cha-cha	Charleston	Viennese Waltz	Bollywood (Olga & Rafał)						Viennese Waltz
Ewa & Jacek	Tango	Cha-cha-cha	Foxtrot	Contemporary	Freestyle (Group Girls)	Viennese Waltz	Waltz	Tango (Robert)	Jive	Contemporary									Viennese Waltz
Urszula & Wojciech	Tango	Jive	Rumba	Contemporary	Freestyle (Group Girls)	Samba	Viennese Waltz	Samba (Misheel)											Viennese Waltz
Sławomir & Magdalena	Jive	Viennese Waltz	Cha-cha-cha	Paso Doble	Freestyle (Group Boys)	Quickstep													Viennese Waltz
Mariola & Tomasz	Cha-cha-cha	Waltz	Salsa	Foxtrot	Freestyle (Group Girls)														Viennese Waltz
Kamil & Valeriya	Jive	Tango	Samba																
Karolina & Żora	Waltz	Cha-cha-cha																	Viennese Waltz
Tomasz & Natalia	Waltz																		Viennese Waltz

Highest scoring dance
Lowest scoring dance
Performed, but not scored

== Call-out order ==
Order	Week 1	Week 2	Week 3	Week 4	Week 5	Week 6 (Note: Week 6: Urszula & Wojciech and Misheel & Jan were in the bottom two. The order of the other couples is based on the judges' scores.)	Week 7	Week 8 (Note: Week 8: Adam & Wiktoria were eliminated. The order of the other couples is based on the judges' scores.)	Week 9	Week 10
1	Olga & Rafał	Sławomir & Magdalena	Olga & Rafał	Sławomir & Magdalena	Robert & Hanna	Ewa & Jacek	Robert & Hanna	Olga & Rafał	Olga & Rafał	Robert & Hanna
2	Urszula & Wojciech	Adam & Wiktoria	Sławomir & Magdalena	Adam & Wiktoria	Olga & Rafał	Robert & Hanna	Olga & Rafał	Robert & Hanna	Robert & Hanna	Olga & Rafał
3	Robert & Hanna	Olga & Rafał	Urszula & Wojciech	Olga & Rafał	Misheel & Jan	Olga & Rafał	Misheel & Jan	Misheel & Jan	Misheel & Jan	
4	Sławomir & Magdalena	Misheel & Jan	Adam & Wiktoria	Robert & Hanna	Urszula & Wojciech	Adam & Wiktoria	Adam & Wiktoria	Adam & Wiktoria		
5	Adam & Wiktoria	Robert & Hanna	Robert & Hanna	Ewa & Jacek	Ewa & Jacek	Misheel & Jan	Ewa & Jacek			
6	Ewa & Jacek	Ewa & Jacek	Ewa & Jacek	Urszula & Wojciech	Adam & Wiktoria	Urszula & Wojciech				
7	Karolina & Żora	Kamil & Valeriya	Misheel & Jan	Misheel & Jan	Sławomir & Magdalena					
8	Misheel & Jan	Mariola & Tomasz	Mariola & Tomasz	Mariola & Tomasz						
9	Mariola & Tomasz	Urszula & Wojciech	Kamil & Valeriya							
10	Kamil & Valeriya	Karolina & Żora								
11	Tomasz & Natalia									

This couple came in first place with the judges.
This couple came in last place with the judges.
This couple came in last place with the judges and was eliminated.
This couple was eliminated.
This couple withdrew from the competition.
This couple was saved from elimination by immunity.
This couple won the competition.
This couple came in second in the competition.
This couple came in third in the competition.

== Guest performances ==
Date	Artist(s)	Song(s)	Dancers
2 September 2016	Tomasz Szymuś's Orchestra	"Can't Stop the Feeling!"	All professional dancers
2 September 2016	Natalia Szroeder	"Lustra"	Kamil Mokrzycki & Valeriya Zhuravlyova
2 September 2016	Natalia Szroeder	"Domek z kart"	—
16 September 2016	Tomasz Szymuś's Orchestra	"Macarena"	All professional dancers and celebrities
16 September 2016	Loka	"Na jednej z dzikich plaż"	Ewa Błachnio & Jacek Jeschke
16 September 2016	Rafał Brzozowski	"Tak blisko"	Kamil Mokrzycki & Valeriya Zhuravlyova
23 September 2016	Beata Kozidrak	"Upiłam się Tobą"	VOLT dance group
30 September 2016	Tomasz Szymuś's Orchestra	songs for Peter Pan	Studio Buffo
30 September 2016	Mateusz Dębski with Tomasz Szymuś's Orchestra	"Under the Sea"	Urszula Dębska & Wojciech Jeschke
30 September 2016	Tomasz Szymuś's Orchestra	"Mam tę moc"	Mini Caro Dance
14 October 2016	Jula	"Milion słów"	Misheel Jargalsaikhan & Jan Kliment
14 October 2016	Ewelina Lisowska	"Prosta sprawa"	Olga Kalicka & Rafał Maserak
14 October 2016	Grzegorz Hyży	"Pod wiatr"	Ewa Błachnio & Jacek Jeschke
14 October 2016	Monika Lewczuk	"Ty i ja"	Robert Wabich & Hanna Żudziewicz
14 October 2016	Szymon Chodyniecki	"Z całych sił"	Adam Zdrójkowski & Wiktoria Omyła
14 October 2016	Sławomir Zapała	"Nie mam hektara"	—
21 October 2016	Cugowscy	"Zaklęty Krąg"	—
28 October 2016	Margaret	"Cool Me Down"	girls with VOLT dance group
28 October 2016	Tomasz Szymuś's Orchestra	"Run"	Lenka Klimentová Tvrzová & Ján Kliment
4 November 2016	Tomasz Szymuś's Orchestra	"A Little Less Conversation"	All professional dancers and celebrities
4 November 2016	Tomasz Szymuś's Orchestra	"Beneath Your Beautiful"	Anna Karczmarczyk & Jacek Jeschke (Season 18 champion)
4 November 2016	Tomasz Szymuś's Orchestra	"Oye como va"	Michał Malitowski & Joanna Leunis
4 November 2016	Tomasz Szymuś's Orchestra	"Jailhouse Rock" "Tutti Frutti"	Agnieszka & Grzegorz Cherubińscy and Swing Step PL
4 November 2016	Tomasz Szymuś's Orchestra	"My Heart Will Go On" (Instrumental)	Tomasz Ciachorowski & Natalia Głębocka; Karolina Gorczyca & Żora Korolyov; Mariola Bojarska-Ferenc & Tomasz Barański; Sławomir Zapała & Magdalena Molęda; Urszula Dębska & Wojciech Jeschke; Ewa Błachnio & Jacek Jeschke; Adam Zdrójkowski & Wiktoria Omyła; Misheel Jargalsaikhan & Jan Kliment
4 November 2016	Tomasz Szymuś's Orchestra		Vanesa Villalba & Facundo Pinero

== Rating figures ==
Date	Episode	Official rating 4+	Share 4+	Official rating 16–49	Share 16–49	Official rating 16–59	Share 16–59
2 September 2016	1	2 670 864	19.80%	—N/a	—N/a	—N/a	—N/a
9 September 2016	2	2 598 673	19.43%	—N/a	—N/a	—N/a	—N/a
16 September 2016	3	2 792 135	19.41%	—N/a	—N/a	—N/a	—N/a
23 September 2016	4	2 895 818	19.63%	—N/a	—N/a	—N/a	—N/a
30 September 2016	5	2 793 907	18.75%	—N/a	—N/a	—N/a	—N/a
7 October 2016	6	3 072 937	19.99%	—N/a	—N/a	—N/a	—N/a
14 October 2016	7	3 125 450	20.29%	—N/a	—N/a	—N/a	—N/a
21 October 2016	8	2 946 185	18.40%	—N/a	—N/a	—N/a	—N/a
28 October 2016	9	2 981 345	19.41%	—N/a	—N/a	—N/a	—N/a
4 November 2016	10	3 297 409	21.05%	—N/a	—N/a	—N/a	—N/a
Average	Fall 2016	2 913 881	19.64%	777 800	13.63%	1 308 896	15.26%
