= Kierczyński =

Kierczyński (feminine: Kierczyńska) is a Polish surname. Notable people with the surname include:

- Maria Garbowska-Kierczyńska (1922–2016), Polish actress
- Martyna Kierczyńska (born 2002), Polish Muay Thai fighter
- Melania Kierczyńska (1888–1962), Polish communist activist, writer and translator
- Ryszard Kierczyński (1902–1971), Polish actor
