= Putin (film) =

2024 Polish film

- Film poster
- Directed by: Patryk Vega
- Written by: Patryk Vega
- Produced by: Patryk Vega
- Starring: Slawomir Sobala; Tomasz Dedek; Justyna Karlowska; Thomas Kretschmann
- Cinematography: Michal Goscik
- Edited by: Tomasz Widarski
- Music by: Łukasz Targosz
- Production company: Vega Investments
- Release date: 3 November 2024
- Running time: 109 minutes
- Countries: Poland; United States; Malta
- Language: English
- Budget: $15 million

Putin (stylised in faux Cyrillic as PUTIИ) is a 2024 English-language Polish biographical film directed by Patryk Vega. The film, depicting the rise to power of Russian president Vladimir Putin, debuted at a festival on 3 November 2024, and was released to cinemas on 10 January 2025.

== Synopsis ==
The film covers the life of Vladimir Putin and focuses on key milestones in Putin's real life, including his childhood in Leningrad in the post-World War II Soviet Union, his recruitment into the KGB and subsequent Cold War-era career as an intelligence officer, and his tenure as the President of Russia. The film concludes with a fictionalized portrayal of Putin’s death.

== Cast ==
- Sławomir Sobala as Vladimir Putin (enhanced with AI to resemble Putin’s likeness)
- Kalina Wysocka as Tanya
- Thomas Kretschmann as the General in 2026
- Tomasz Dedek as Boris Yeltsin
- Marek Kasprzyk as Anatoly Sobchak
- Natalia Lange as Lyudmila Narusova
- Jan Monczka as Nikolay Patrushev
- Zbigniew Kozłowski as Putin's chief of staff
- Natalia Jędruś as Tamara, Putin's secretary
- Justyna Karłowska as Legion
- Maksymilian Zieliński as the demon

== Production ==
The film was produced by the independent production and distribution company XYZEl. The film was shot across various countries to authentically depict significant locations tied to Putin’s life and career, including Russia, Ukraine, Israel, Syria, Jordan and Poland.

=== Use of artificial intelligence ===
Artificial intelligence (AI) was used to alter the facial features of the lead actor, Sławomir Sobala, to make him look almost identical to Vladimir Putin. The technology used in the film was specifically developed for the film by the Polish studio AIO. This marks the first instance in cinematic history where AI was used to digitally transform the lead actor’s appearance for an entire motion picture.

== Release ==
It was shown to international distributors at the Cannes Film Festival. It was sold to nearly fifty countries.

== Reception ==
In 2026, it received the Snake Award, issued for the worst cinematographic failures in Polish cinema, "for a film that is almost as bad as the character it tries to tell the story about".
