= Ihnatowicz =

Ihnatowicz (Polish: [ix.naˈtɔ.vit͡ʂ]) is a Polish surname. Notable people with the surname include:

- Aleksander Ihnatowicz (born 1984), Polish programmer and actor
- Edward Ihnatowicz (1926–1988), Polish sculptor
