= Where Eskimos Live =

2002 film by Tomasz Wiszniewski

- Where Eskimos Live Promotional Movie Poster
- Directed by: Tomasz Wiszniewski
- Written by: Robert Brutter; Tomasz Wiszniewski
- Produced by: Chris Burdza, Paula Paizes
- Starring: Bob Hoskins; Sergiusz Zymelka; Krzysztof Majchrzak
- Cinematography: Alexei Rodionov
- Edited by: Henry Richardson
- Music by: Michal Lorenc
- Release date: May 2002
- Running time: 95 minutes
- Countries: Poland; United States; United Kingdom; Germany
- Language: English

Where Eskimos Live (Polish: Tam, gdzie żyją Eskimosi) is a feature film released in 2002. It was a Polish-American-British and Germany co-operation.

Sharkey, posing as a UNICEF rescuer of war orphans but really part of the sinister world of child trafficking, picks up Vlado, an orphan of war dreaming of freedom and a better life. They embark upon a strange and enlightening journey through war-torn Bosnia. As they struggle to leave the country and fight to stay alive, they discover love and compassion from which emerges moral and spiritual redemption.

== Cast ==
- Bob Hoskins as Sharkey
- Sergiusz Żymełka as Vlado
- Krzysztof Majchrzak as Colonel Vuko
- Marcin Dorociński as musician on christenings
- Przemysław Sadowski as deserter
- Katarzyna Bargiełowska as crying woman
- Mirosław Baka as principal
- Szymon Bobrowski as physician
- Jarosław Boberek as truck driver
- Marek Kasprzyk as head of the Russian mafia
- Tomasz Dedek as member of the Russian mafia
- Bronisław Pawlik as old man in the library
- Piotr Grabowski as soldier
- Dariusz Malesza as boy with gang
- Andrzej Chyra as lawyer
- Miraj Grbić as an additional actor
