= Gabriela Kownacka =

Polish actress (1952–2010)

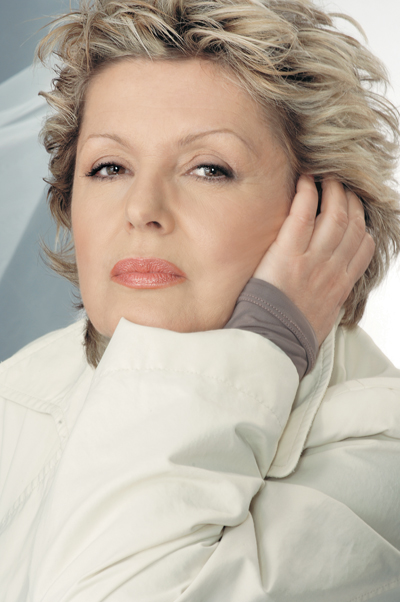
- Gabriela Kownacka
- Born: 25 May 1952; Wrocław, Poland
- Died: 30 November 2010 (aged 58); Warsaw, Poland
- Occupation: Actress
- Years active: 1972–2007

Gabriela Anna Kownacka (née Kwasz) (25 May 1952 in Wrocław – 30 November 2010 in Warsaw) was a Polish film and stage actress, best known for playing in the Polish TV series Rodzina zastępcza. Kownacka was a Lutheran.

== Biography ==
She has starred in over 60 television theater roles and starred in over 40 theater productions across the country.

By the decision of the President of the Republic of Poland of August 22, 2005, she was awarded the Cross of Merit.

Kownacka died on 30 November 2010, aged 58, after a long battle with breast cancer that began in 2004. On 7 December 2010, she was interred at the Evangelical Cemetery of the Augsburg Confession in Warsaw.

== Illness and death ==
The grave of Gabriela Kownacka (1952–2010) and her parents at the Evangelical-Augsburg Cemetery in Warsaw

In 2004, Kownacka was diagnosed with breast cancer. Several months of chemotherapy and radiotherapy proved successful, allowing her to return to work on the set of the television series Rodzina zastępcza.

At the turn of May and June 2008, the disease relapsed and her health deteriorated considerably. On 9 March 2009, a charity concert was held at the National Theatre, Warsaw, with all proceeds donated towards Kownacka's treatment.

Kownacka died on 30 November 2010. She was buried on 7 December 2010 at the Evangelical-Augsburg Cemetery in Warsaw (avenue 41, grave 27).

The funeral ceremony was attended, among others, by Maja Komorowska, Joanna Szczepkowska, Gołda Tencer, Ewa Ziętek, Marian Opania, Wojciech Malajkat, as well as members of the cast of Rodzina zastępcza, including Piotr Fronczewski and Jarosław Boberek. Actor Marcin Hycnar read a farewell letter on behalf of Jan Englert, director of the National Theatre, Warsaw.

== Filmography ==
- 1972: The Wedding – Zosia
- 1975: Skazany – Kasia
- 1976: Trędowata – Rita Szylinżanka
- 1977: Ciuciubabka – Grażyna
- 1977: Pani Bovary to ja
- 1977: Rebus – Ania
- 1977: Rekolekcje – Myszka
- 1977: Szarada – Ewa
- 1978: Hallo Szpicbródka – Anita
- 1979: I, Claudius − Drusilla (voice, Polish dub)
- 1980: Urodziny młodego warszawiaka – Jadźka
- 1980: Ukryty w słońcu – Joanna
- 1980: Bo oszalałem dla niej – Sylwia
- 1981: Dziecinne pytania – Bożena
- 1981: Przypadki Piotra S. – prostitute
- 1981: Spokojne lata – Iza
- 1983: Nadzór – Danusia Wabik
- 1983: Visitors from the Arkana Galaxy − Biba (voice, Polish dub)
- 1984: Jak się pozbyć czarnego kota – Krystyna Danek
- 1984: Pismak – Maria
- 1984: Zamiana – Ola
- 1985: Kronika wypadków miłosnych – Olimpia
- 1985: Ga, ga. Chwała bohaterom – blondie woman
- 1985: Żaglowiec – Michael's mother
- 1985: Czarny kot
- 1986: Nieproszony gość
- 1987: Hanussen – Propaganda chief's wife
- 1988: Niezwykła podróż Baltazara Kobera – Gertruda
- 1989: Kapitał, czyli jak zrobić pieniądze w Polsce – Barbara Nowosad
- 1989: Yacht – wife
- 1992: Smacznego telewizorku – Teresa Adler
- 1992: Sauna – Masza
- 1992: Zwolnieni z życia – Elżbieta
- 1993: Les Nouveaux Exploits d'Arsene Lupin
- 1995–1998: Matki, żony i kochanki – Dorota Padlewska-Lindner
- 1996: Cesarska tabakierka – Baronowa
- 1996: Dzieci i ryby – Ewelina
- 1999: Fuks – Alex's mother
- 1999: Kiler-ów 2-óch – president's wife
- 1999–2008: Rodzina zastępcza – Anna Kwiatkowska
- 1999: Baldur's Gate – Viconia DeVir (voice, Polish dub)
- 1999: Bratobójstwo
- 2000: Baldur's Gate II: Shadows of Amn – Viconia DeVir (voice, Polish dub)
- 2001: Pas de deux – Anna Struziakowa
- 2002: Na dobre i na złe – Lidia Kornecka
- 2003: Powiedz to, Gabi – actress
- 2004: The Haunted Mansion – Madame Leota (voice, Polish dub)
- 2006: Przebacz – mother
- 2007: Arthur and the Minimoys – Daisy Suchot (voice, Polish dub)
- 2007: Dwie strony medalu – Jolanta Wysocka
- 2007: Niania – herself
