= Włodarczyk =

Włodarczyk (Polish pronunciation: [vwɔˈdart͡ʂɨk]) is a Polish surname. It may refer to:

- Agnieszka Włodarczyk (born 1980), Polish actress and singer
- Anita Włodarczyk (born 1985), Polish hammer thrower
- Anna Włodarczyk (born 1951), Polish athlete primarily known for the long jump
- Dominika Włodarczyk (born 2001), Polish cyclist
- Krzysztof Włodarczyk (born 1981), Polish boxer
- Michał Włodarczyk (born 1995), Polish actor
- Piotr Włodarczyk (born 1977), Polish footballer
- Rafał Włodarczyk, Polish footballer
- Szymon Włodarczyk (born 2003), Polish footballer
- Thomas Wlodarczyk, American rapper and songwriter
- Urszula Włodarczyk (born 1965), Polish heptathlete and triple jumper
- Wanda Włodarczyk (1925–2003), Polish fencer
- Wojciech Włodarczyk (born 1990), Polish volleyball player
