= Sergiusz Żymełka =

Polish actor (born 1991)

- Born: 10 April 1991 (age 35); Warsaw, Poland
- Education: Warsaw University of Technology and Economics
- Occupation: Actor
- Years active: 1996–present

Sergiusz Żymełka (born 10 April 1991) is a film, television, and voice actor. He is best known from portraying Filip Kwiatkowski in the television series Foster Family (1999–2009).

== Biography ==
Sergiusz Żymełka was born on 10 April 1991 in Warsaw, Poland.

He debuted in acting in 1996, voicing a character in the Polish-language dubbing version of American film One Fine Day. Between 1998 and 2002, he also acted in several television plays of Polish Television. From 1999 to 2009, he portrayed Filip Kwiatkowski, one of the main characters in the television series Foster Family, which became his most recognizable role. He also portrayed Vlado Petric, one of the main characters in the 2002 film Where Eskimos Live. He additionally appeared in films Deserter's Gold (1998), Egoists (2000), Wtorek (2002), and Miss mokrego podkoszulka (2003), and in television series Na dobre i na złe (2001, 2004), and Na Wspólnej (2010).

After that he stopped acting, and graduated in the business psychology from the Warsaw University of Technology and Economics. Following that, he began working in the Center for Information Technology. Leter he worked in the marketing field, and after that, in business strategy and development.

In 2015 he appeared in an episode of Father Matthew, and in 2018, in an episode of Barwy szczęścia. In 2019 he had a small role in the film Women of Mafia 2. In 2020 he was a guest in an episode of the TVN realty show Projekt Lady. Since 2017 he also had numerous voice acting roles in Polish-language dubbing.

== Filmography ==
=== Films ===
Year	Title	Role	Notes
1998	Deserter's Gold	Haber's son	
1998	Walizka	Boguś	Television play
1998	Swoja	Paweł	Television play
1998	Książę Chochlik		Television play
1999	Perły szczęścia nie dają	Piotrek	Television play
1999	Lalek	Child	Television play
1999	Dwustu służących i śnieg	Mikey	Television play
2000	Egoists	Boy at the railway track	
2000	Stół	Marcin	Television play
2001	Beatryks Cenci	Azo Cenci	Television play
2002	Where Eskimos Live	Vlado Petric	Main role
2002	Wtorek	Patryk	
2002	Smutne miasteczko		Television play
2003	Miss mokrego podkoszulka	Władysław's grandson	
2019	Women of Mafia 2	Drug diller	

=== Television series ===
Year	Title	Role	Notes
1999–2009	Foster Family	Filip Kwiatkowski	Main role; 303 episodes
2001	Na dobre i na złe	Boy in the rehabilitation therapy	Episode: "Zgubny zwyczaj" (no. 69)
2004	Na dobre i na złe	Adam	Episode: "Kozioł ofiarny" (no. 190)
2005	Rozmowy w toku	Himself	Talkshow; 1 episode
2010	Na Wspólnej	Ruda's friend	Episode no. 1251
2015	Father Matthew	Darek Szczepanek	Episode: "Rave party" (no. 185)
2018	Barwy szczęścia	Law student	Episode no. 1862
2019	Women of Mafia 2	Drug diller	1 episode
2020	Projekt Lady	Himself	Reality show; 1 episode
