= Marcin Korcz =

Polish actor (born 1986)

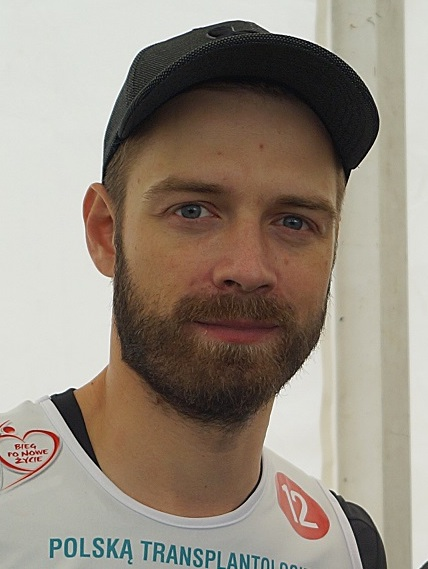
- Korcz in 2019.
- Born: 15 November 1986 (age 39); Kraków, Poland
- Education: Łódź Film School
- Occupation: Actor
- Years active: 2008–present

Marcin Korcz (Polish: [ˈmar.t͡ɕin ˈkɔrt͡ʂ]; born 15 November 1986) is a film, television, and stage actor. He is best known for portraying roles in television series such as Michał Kercz in Foster Family (2008–2009), Dagmar Balicki in Friends (2012–present), Szymon Kmieciński in First Love (2012–2014), Paweł Radecki in I'll Be Fine (2016–2020), and Maks in Gra na Maksa (2022–2024), and Mariusz Milewski in Na dobre i na złe (2022–2024), as well as the leading role of Kazik in film Being Like Deyna (2012).

== Biography ==
Marcin Korcz was born on 15 November 1986 in Kraków, Poland. He has a sister. Korcz grew up in the town of Libiąż. In his younger, he trained in long-distance cross country running. Korcz originally considered pursuing a career in sports, but after watching a spectacle by Grupa Rafała Kmity in Theatre Scena STU, he decided to become an actor instead. For two years, he attended Dorota Pomykała's acting classes, and in 2009, he graduated from the Łódź Film School.

In 2010, Korcz begun performing in the Stefan Jaracz Theatre in Łódź. He became known for portraying roles in television series such as Michał Kercz in Foster Family (2008–2009), Dagmar Balicki in Friends (2012–present), Szymon Kmieciński in First Love (2012–2014), Paweł Radecki in I'll Be Fine (2016–2020), and Mariusz Milewski in Na dobre i na złe (2022–2024). He also portrayed the leading role of Kazik in a 2012 comedy drama film Being Like Deyna, and Maks in the comedy television series Gra na Maksa (2022–2024).

He was nominated for the 2017 Telekamera award in the "hope of television" award. In 2017, he participated in the talent show Dancing with the Stars. Taniec z gwiazdami, where, partnered with Wiktoria Omyła, reached the first place in the semi-finale.

== Filmography ==
=== Films ===
Year	Title	Role	Notes
2006	Ostatni dzień	Piotr	Short film
2008	Love and Dance	Assistant	Feature film
2008	Kanalie		Short film
2009	Never Say Never	Nightclub customer	Feature film
2009	Słowacja		Short film
2009	Sweet Rush	Water management authority employee	Feature film
2009	Tresura		Short film
2010	Pobaw się ze mną	Marcin	Short film
2010	Venice	Gaffer from Germany	Feature film
2012	Being Like Deyna	Kazik	Feature film; main role
2014	Kochanie, chyba cię zabiłem	Kacper	Feature film
2014	Warsaw 44	Karol	Feature film
2015	89.	Piotr	Short film
2015	Persona Non Grata	German captain	Feature film
2015	Pożądanie		Short film
2015	Słaba płeć?	Janek Biały	Feature film
2018	Love Is Everything	Krzysztof	Feature film
2018	Łowcy	Boy	Short film
2023	Barwy uczuć	Henryk	Television play
2023	Wszystko dla mojej przyjaciółki	Bernacki	Short film

=== Television series ===
Year	Title	Role	Notes
2008–2009	Foster Family	Michał Kercz	Recruiting role; 21 episodes
2009	Dekalog 89+	"Czarny"	Episode: "Nowa" (no. 2)
2009	Marina	Kuba	Episode: "Rywale" (no. 11)
2010	Father Matthew	Karol	Episode: "Talent" (no. 51)
2010	L for Love	Petrol station employee	Episode no. 731
2010	Mountain Rescue Team	Marek	4 episodes
2010	Samo życie	Daniel	
2010	Usta usta	Dorian's friend	Episode no. 11
2011	Hotel 52	Darek	Episode no. 30
2011	Recipe For Life	Wiktor	4 episodes
2011	Rezydencja	Dawid	
2012	Days of Honor	Soldier in a hospital	2 episodes
2012	Komisarz Alex	Michał	Episode: "Ślady krwi" (no. 19)
2012	True Law	Mikołaj	Episode no. 22
2012–2014	First Love	Szymon Kmieciński	Recurring role
2012–2024	Friends	Dagmar Balicki	Recurring role; 210 episodes
2015	Prosecutor	IT specialist	Episode no. 10
2016	Singielka	Łukasz Gradowski	4 episodes
2016–2020	I'll Be Fine	Paweł Radecki	Main role; 114 episodes
2017	Dancing with the Stars. Taniec z gwiazdami	Himself (contestant)	Talent show
2019	Wartime Girls	Leon Keller	12 episodes
2020	Family Turmoil	Helena's trainer	Episode no. 18
2021	Backdoor. Wyjscie awaryjne		4 episodes
2022	Family Secrets	Dawid	5 episodes
2022–2024	Gra na Maksa	Maks	Main role; 64 episodes
2022–2024	Na dobre i na złe	Mariusz Milewski	Main role; 42 episodes
