= Maria Garbowska-Kierczyńska =

Polish actress (1922–2016)

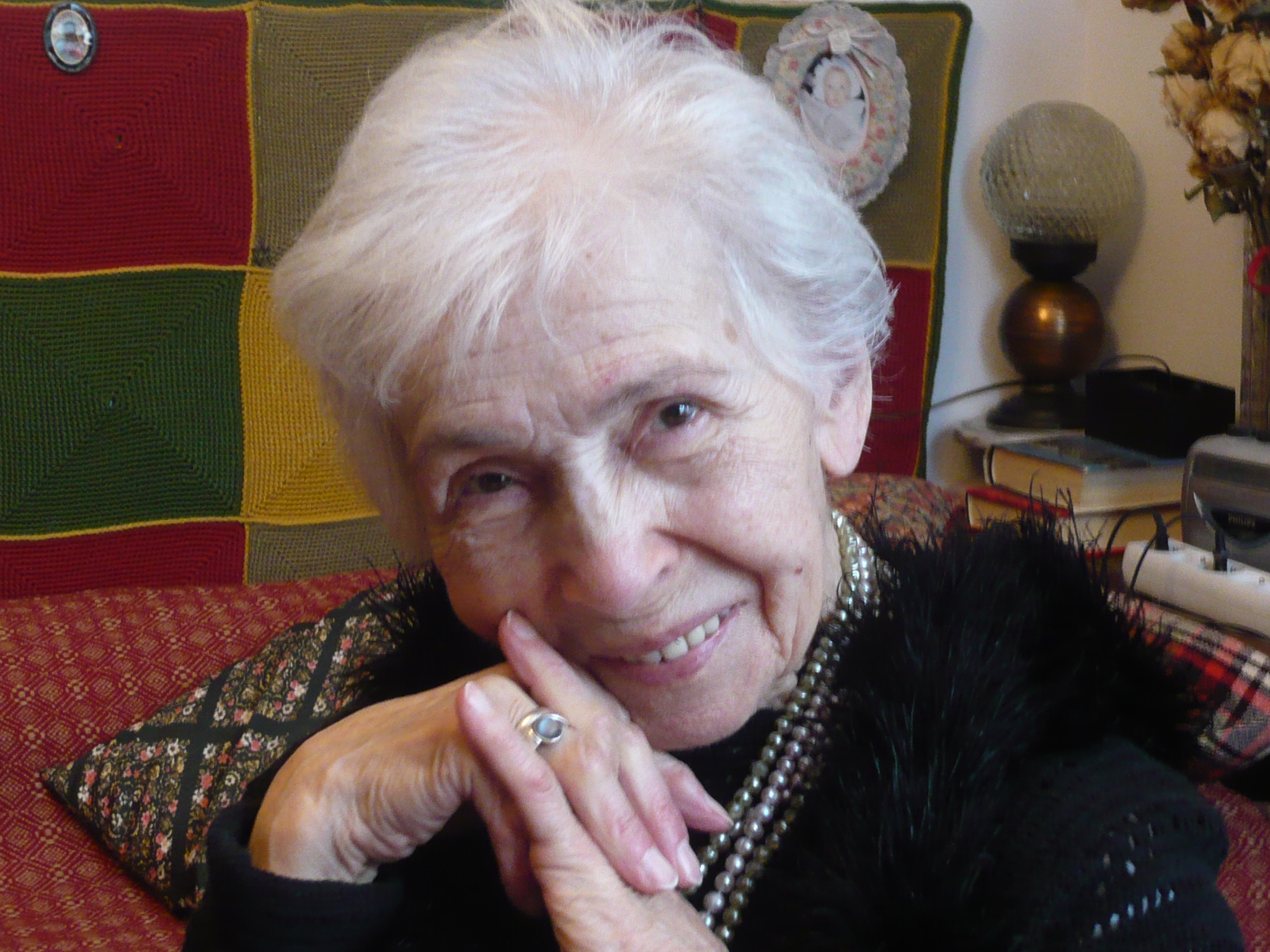
- Born: Marianna Garbowska; 3 December 1922; Garbów, Poland
- Died: 2 January 2016 (aged 93); Skolimów, Konstancin-Jeziorna, Mazowieckie, Poland
- Occupation: Actress
- Years active: 1946–2012
- Spouse: Ryszard Kierczyński
- Children: 2

Maria Garbowska-Kierczyńska (3 December 1922 – 2 January 2016) was a Polish film, stage and television actress, sometimes known as Marianna Garbowska. She began her career in 1946. She appeared in films such as Job, czyli ostatnia szara komórka (2006) and Aftermath (2012). Her television credits included Plebania and Ojciec Mateusz. She was a member of the National Theatre in Warsaw from 1969 to 1979. She was born in Garbów and later married Ryszard Kierczyński.

== Death ==
Garbowska-Kierczyńska died on 2 January 2016 in Konstancin-Jeziorna, aged 93.

== Filmography ==
	Title	Role	Notes
1953	Okno w lesie	Wala	
1967	Mocne uderzenie		
1974	Najwazniejszy dzien zycia	Maria Sochacka	Episode Uszczelka
1986	Tulipan		Episode 1.2
1989-91	W labiryncie	Wladyslawa	27 Episodes
2000-1	Plebania	Marcelina Prokopiukowa	17 Episodes
2006	Job, czyli ostatnia szara komórka	Adie's Grandmother	
2009	Obcy VI	Mrs. Krystyna	(Short)
2009	Ojciec Mateusz	Maria	Episode Pomylka
2009	Na dobre i na zle	Patient	Episode Ojcowski debiut
2009	Reverse (film)	Elderly Sabina	(Voice)
2009	Vodka and Women	Magda's aunt	(Short)
2012	Aftermath (2012 Polish film)	Palka	

== Stage appearances ==
=== 1946 Teatr Miejski, Lublin ===
- Fresh Paint! (1946)
- Godzina wieszczów (1946)

=== 1947-49 Stefan Żeromski Theatre, Kielce ===
- Jutro pogoda (1947)
- Pani prezesowa (1947)
- Głupi Jakub (1948)
- Król włóczęgów (1948)
- Strzały na ulicy Długiej (1948)
- Jadzia wdowa (1948)
- All My Sons (1949) (Ann Deever)

=== 1950-1968 Teatr Powszechny, Warsaw ===
- Gastello (1950)
- Moskiewski charakter (1950)
- Rozbitki (1950)
- Awans (1951)
- Niespokjna starość (1952)
- The Game of Love and Chance (1952) (Lisette)
- Proces (1953)
- The Cricket on the Hearth (1953)
- Niezwykła historia (1953)
- Imieniny pana dyrektora (1954)
- Zdarzenie (1954)
- Suchy kraj (1956)
- Podróż po Warszawie (1957)
- Klątwa (1957)
- The Rainmaker (play) (1958) (Lizzie Curry)
- Under Milk Wood (1959) (Lily Smalls)
- Lysistrata (1959) (Nikodike)
- The Caucasian Chalk Circle (1960)
- Król w kraju rozkoszy (1960)
- Resurrection (play) (1961) (Dróżniczka)
- Zaczarowany las (1961)
- Heloise and Abelard (1962)
- Skandal w Hellbergu (1962)
- The Three Musketeers (1963)
- Wesele (1963)
- Crime and Punishment (1964)
- Stefan (1964)
- Pastorałka (1964)
- Kolumbowie rocznik 20 (1965)
- Śmierć Dantona (1968)

=== 1969 ===
- Nieboska komedia (1969)

=== 1970-99 ===
- Kordian (1970)
- The Threepenny Opera (1970)
- Beniowski (1971)
- Three Sisters (play) (1971) (The Servant)
- Wesele (1974)
- Białe małżeństwo (1975)
- Dziady cz.III i Ustęp (1978)
- Jan Maciej Karol Wścieklica (1979)

=== 1980–99 ===
- Nowe Wyzwolenie (1984)
