= Hip-Hip and Hurrah =

2011–2013 Polish comedy/educational animated series

Hip-Hip and Hurrah (Polish - Hip-Hip i Hurra) is a 2011–2013 Polish award-winning comedy/educational animated series created by Elżbieta Wąsik and produced by the biggest Polish animated studio Studio Miniatur Filmowych and Filmograf company. Series premier at the Polish TV station Kino Polska and is currently airing at TVP ABC and JimJam. Outside of Poland the series also aired on Argentina's TV Pakapaka (the show is known in Argentina as Hip Hip Hurra), Romania, Portugal and Italy. The cast included Grzegorz Kwiecień, Krzysztof Szczerbiński, Joanna Pach and famous Polish celebrity actor Jarosław Boberek as the voices for various secondary characters, most notably Peacock and Hummingbird. Most episodes were written by Elżbieta Wąsik, Maciej Kur and Marcin Graj (who also voiced Hip-Hip in the second season). The series consists of 26 episodes.

== Overview ==
The show is set in a world of talking animals who live like humans. The stories focus on the adventures of a detective duo; Hip-Hip (a pink hippopotamus) and his assistant Hurrah (a purple weasel). The names Hip-Hip and Hurrah may stem from the common English expression: hip hip hooray.

In each episode, the heroes try to solve a mystery that usually concludes with an environmental message for the children, such as how rainbow is created, how children are born, how the flowers feed, where do clouds come from, or simply with habits and nature of particular animals. One episode deals with optical perspective. All animal characters on the show appear to operate by very silly logic (similar to that of Winnie-the-Pooh) and are usually puzzled by the most basic phenomena.

While the series is intended for very young children, it often includes humor intended for adults as well. The style of animation is simple but very artistic.

Many episodes have a subplot that is unrelated to the main mystery. Other episodes have twists on the usual formula – for example in one episode Hip-Hip and Hurra solve the mystery behind a series of crimes early on (as a meta-joke even the end credits start rolling). However, the thief, who turns out to be a magpie, claims she is not responsible for the crimes she committed, and the animals put her on a trial with Hip-Hip as the judge. In the end, they all learn that the magpie's actions (stealing shiny objects) were strictly motivated by her instincts, so she can't be punished for her "crimes".

== Characters ==
- Hip-Hip ("Hip" for short) - the main hero, a detective. He is somewhat competent and clumsy at the same time. He has a big crush on Rose but is usually incredibly shy about it. He is bold, fat and eats a lot. He considers himself a master of disguise but they often don't work as well as he was hoping. Most animals in town consider him an authority figure because of all the cases he has solved. He also has a twin sister named Hopla.
- Hurra - Hip-Hip's assistant, a purple, energetic weasel. While often clueless and a bit wacky he usually tries his best to help Hip-Hip solve the mystery. While Hip-Hip usually gets annoyed with him they appear to bond pretty well. Unlike Hip, Hurra isn't shy when it comes to romance.
- Rose the Giraffe - Hip's next-door neighbor who speaks with a French accent. She is very kind and is a professional painter (she paints with her tail). She is a very popular artist as all animals in town appear to be fans of her art. She's Hip-Hip's love interest and appears to have some admiration for him as well. She also work as a nurse.
- Auntie Hen - Hip's landlady. She sometimes serves as the voice of wisdom.
- Misia (Missy) - An ant who lives in Hip-Hip's front packet and is his apprentice. She assists the heroes in some adventures, usually serving as a spy. Despite her ambition, she is very lazy and falls asleep very easily.
- Peacock - narcissistic and obsessed with his tail (which makes an umbrella-like sound each time it opens). He works at the local TV station "Ćwir TV" ("Tweet TV") and is a big celebrity in town.
- Kinga - an attractive mail lady kangaroo and Hurra's girlfriend. She is sweet but very eccentric. Despite being an adult, she lives with her imaginary friend, a flower named Adelka, and usually spends her free time entertaining her.
- Hummingbird - small but aggressive wise guy with an over the top groveling voice which is a parody of Polish actor Witold Pyrkosz.
- The Bear Family - A family of brown bears (depicted as stereotypical people from Praga) who appear once in a while as comedic relief. The family consist of Mr. Bear, his wife and, an adult son referred to as "Synek" ("Sonny Boy") as well three cousins: a polar bear, a sloth bear (who's a dancer from India) and a panda from China.
- Crane - A bank owner and Hip's friend. He panics a lot and easily gets paranoid.
- Gorilla - Another of Hip's friends who loves to drive his scooter. He has a wife and a small child who was born in episode 6.
- Squirrel - She loves to gossip, spread rumors and is often seen spying to see what other animals are doing in their houses.
