= Foster Family (TV series) =

Polish TV series

- Starring: Gabriela Kownacka; Maryla Rodowicz; Piotr Fronczewski; Monika Mrozowska; Leszek Zduń; Sergiusz Żymełka; Aleksandra Szwed; Marcin Korcz; Aleksander Ihnatowicz; Misheel Jargalsajkhan; Wiktoria Gąsiewska; Michał Włodarczyk; Adam Zdrójkowski; Jakub Zdrójkowski; Stanisław Michalski; Joanna Kurowska; Krzysztof Dracz; Joanna Trzepiecińska; Tomasz Dedek; Hanna Śleszyńska; Jarosław Boberek
- Country of origin: Poland
- No. of seasons: 18
- No. of episodes: 329

Production
- Running time: 25 minutes (episodes 1–156); 44 minutes (episodes 157–329)

Original release
- Network: Polsat
- Release: 23 February 1999 – 20 December 2009

Foster Family (Polish: Rodzina zastępcza) is a Polish primetime sitcom broadcast on Polsat from 23 February 1999 to 20 December 2009. In 2004 the title was changed to Foster Family Plus (Polish: Rodzina zastępcza plus) and the series got longer episodes, as well as more regular characters and locations. It was also aired by Nickelodeon at the late night slots from 2012 to 2022.

The series told the story of the Kwiatkowski family, Anka and Jacek, their biological children Majka and Filip, as well as three children they adopted: Eliza, Zosia, Romek, later also Dorotka, Wojtek, Piotrek and Pawełek.

== Cast ==
- Gabriela Kownacka as Anna Kwiatkowska (1999–2008)
- Piotr Fronczewski as Jacek Kwiatkowski (1999–2009)
- Monika Mrozowska as Maja Kwiatkowska, later Potulicka (1999–2009)
- Leszek Zduń as Kuba Potulicki (2004–2009)
- Sergiusz Żymełka as Filip Kwiatkowski (1999–2009)
- Aleksander Ihnatowicz as Romek Latosz (1999–2007)
- Aleksandra Szwed as Eliza (1999–2009)
- Marcin Korcz as Michał Kercz (2008–2009)
- Misheel Jargalsajkhan as Zosia (1999–2007)
- Wiktoria Gąsiewska as Dorotka (2007–2009)
- Michał Włodarczyk as Wojtek (2007–2009)
- Adam Zdrójkowski as Piotruś (2009)
- Jakub Zdrójkowski as Pawełek (2009)
- Maryla Rodowicz as Ula (1999–2009)
- Hanna Śleszyńska as Jadzia Kraśniak (2001–2009)
- Joanna Trzepiecińska as Alicja "Alutka" Kossoń (2000–2009)
- Tomasz Dedek as Jędrzej "Jędrula" Kossoń (2000–2009)
- Jarosław Boberek as the police officer (1999–2009)
- Stanisław Michalski as Jan Ksawery Potulicki, Kuba's grandfather (2004–2009)
- Joanna Kurowska as Krystyna Kercz (2008–2009)
- Krzysztof Dracz as Włodzimierz Kercz (2008–2009)
- Marcin Kołodyński as Darek, Majka's boyfriend (1999–2001)
- Jerzy Słonka as Lesio, Jadzia's husband (2003–2009)
- Borys Szyc as Krzyś Kozłowski (2002)
