= Claims of Vladimir Putin's incapacity and death =

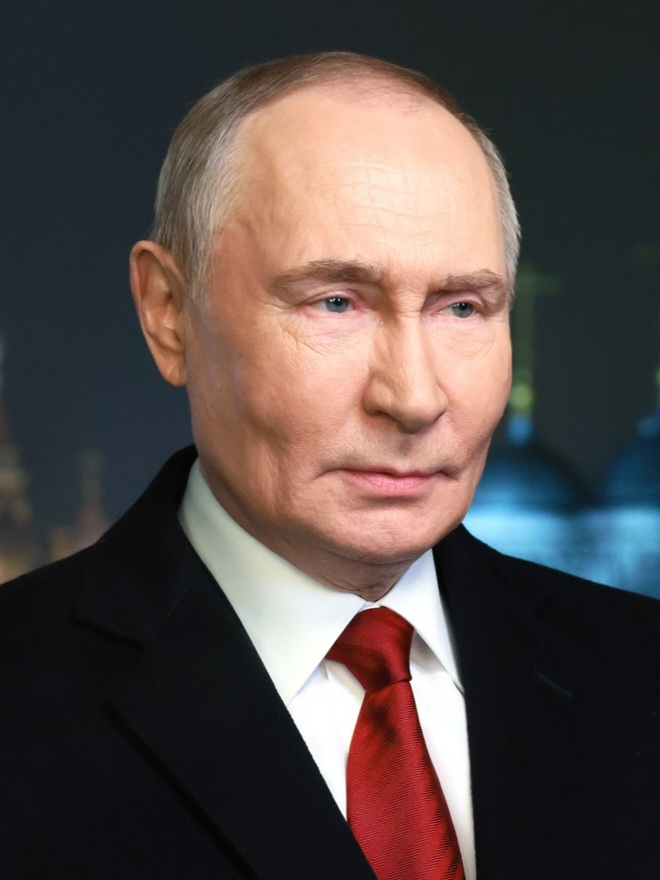
Vladimir Putin in December 2025

Speculations regarding the health of Vladimir Putin have been a regular occurrence since his rise to power as President of Russia. They include theories about severe and potentially terminal medical issues. This is largely speculation and cannot be accredited for authenticity.

== Background ==
For approximately 20 years, multiple sources have regularly reported that the Russian president Vladimir Putin is weeks or months away from death or medical incapacity. At various points, it has been rumored that he is suffering from terminal thyroid cancer, blood cancer, abdominal cancer, Parkinson's disease, leprosy, serious surgery complications, the aftereffects of a stroke, or that he is, in fact, already dead.

According to the New Statesman, many such allegations are based on "the old Soviet-era practice of Kremlinology, in which analysts scrutinise the leader's public appearances for signs of physical decline and clues as to who might be in favour or out, in the absence of reliable information".

== Selected reports ==
=== 2005 report of stroke ===
In 2005, The Atlantic published an essay, with a lengthy section based on observation of film footage, which had led various medical experts to speculate that Putin may have suffered a stroke in utero, could be afflicted with "an Erb's palsy, caused by a forceps tugging on his right shoulder at birth", or had polio as a child.

=== 2014 report of cancer ===
It was reported according to an unnamed German doctor, that Putin was receiving treatment for an "often terminal form of cancer". Kremlin spokesman Dmitry Peskov denied the claim.

=== 2015 report of cosmetic surgery complications ===
Mainstream media outlets in the United States reported that Vladimir Putin might be seriously ill due to complications from a secret cosmetic surgery procedure it was claimed he'd undergone. The rumors originated after the Russian president postponed a scheduled meeting from 11 to 18 March, as well as analysis of background objects in official photographs by Russia observers.

Vox reported that "the idea that Putin would schedule plastic surgery for a week when he was supposed to have multiple public meetings seems highly implausible" and Russian government spokesman Dmitry Peskov denied Putin was suffering any type of medical issues. Asked to comment on the report Putin was dying of surgery complications, the Brookings Institution's Hannah Thoburn said "for all we know, he probably has the flu, or just wanted to hang out with his daughters or something". Russian television later aired footage of Putin attending a separate meeting on 13 March.

=== 2017 and 2020 reports of leprosy and Parkinson's disease ===
In 2017, Russian historian and political analyst Valery Solovei asserted Vladimir Putin was about to resign for health-related reasons. Putin did not resign. In 2020, Solovei and others variously claimed that Putin had cancer, Parkinson's disease or leprosy and would imminently resign, a claim which also did not transpire.

=== 2022 reports of multiple illnesses ===
Following the Russo-Ukrainian war, according to The New York Times, rumors of Putin being seriously ill became "a subject of lurid speculation, internet video forensics, and potential wartime propaganda, even though U.S. officials say there is no evidence the Russian leader is dying".

In May 2022, Ukrainian military intelligence chief Kyrylo Budanov reported that Vladimir Putin was simultaneously suffering from "several serious illnesses, one of which is cancer". Christopher Steele also alleged Putin was "dying".

The New Statesman reported there was "no verifiable evidence that Putin is seriously ill"; Russian foreign minister Sergei Lavrov denied the allegation; William Burns, the director of the United States Central Intelligence Agency said "as far as we can tell, he's entirely too healthy"; and Richard Moore, the head of MI6 said there "is no evidence that Putin is suffering from serious illness".

On 28 May 2022, the Daily Star even speculated that Putin might have already died of blood cancer. The Sunday Mirror published its own story the next day also reporting that Putin may have been dead.

In July 2022, the Toronto Sun and other media outlets reported Putin had lost use of his right arm due to an unexplained medical crisis. The Toronto Sun cited, as evidence of the allegation, that a video showed Putin swatting a mosquito with his left arm instead of his right.

Neurologists have previously noted that several Russian officials such as Anatoly Sidorov and Sergei Ivanov who, like Putin, have specialized training by Soviet-era military and intelligence services and typically make limited use of their right arm, often holding it unnaturally stiff to the side of the torso in what is called gunslinger's gait. A 2015 study by Dutch physicians published in the British Medical Journal which compared video of the various officials against body movement instructions in a KGB training manual, suggested this was a learned behavioral adaptation to allow quick access to a firearm in response to a sudden threat and probably not a signifier of any medical condition in either Putin or other Russian political leaders.

In December 2022, Solovei announced Putin was being treated with cancer drugs for an unspecified, advanced stage cancer and "the end is already in sight". Several years prior, in 2017, Solovei suggested that Putin might resign due to ill health.

=== January 2023 claim by Zelenskyy ===
In January 2023, Ukrainian president Volodymyr Zelenskyy publicly "questioned whether Vladimir Putin was still alive" during a virtual address to the World Economic Forum and suggested that Putin might have already been replaced by his body double.

=== October 2023 claims of death ===
In October 2023, Russian Telegram channel "General [of] SVR" and Solovei said that Putin had died on 26 October from complications of cancer. According to Solovei, a body double was successfully used to replace the real Putin in many public activities and meetings during the last several months. Earlier, the Kremlin denied media reports which claimed Putin was suffering from a serious illness, citing "General SVR".

== See also ==
- List of premature obituaries
- Alleged doubles of Vladimir Putin
- Illness and death claims regarding other public figures:
  - Age and health concerns about Donald Trump
  - Age and health concerns about Joe Biden
  - Paul is dead, regarding English musician Paul McCartney
