= Celebrity Splash! (Polish TV series) =

- Genre: Reality
- Presented by: Krzysztof Jankowski; Łukasz Grass
- Judges: Otylia Jędrzejczak; Tomasz Zimoch; Danuta Stenka
- Country of origin: Poland
- Original language: Polish
- No. of series: 1

Production
- Production locations: Termy Maltańskie, Poznań

Original release
- Network: Polsat
- Release: 7 March 2015 – present

Related
- Celebrity Splash!

Celebrity Splash! is a Polish reality television series about celebrities trying to master the art of diving. The format for the show is a franchise that originated in the Netherlands by television production company Eyeworks., and was broadcast on SBS6 as Sterren Springen (Celebrities Jump).

Krzysztof Jankowski and Łukasz Grass present the show.

== Cast ==
Celebrity	Occupation / known for	Status
Przemysław Saleta	Professional boxer	Eliminated 1st on 7 March 2015
Ilona Felicjańska	Model	Eliminated 2nd on 7 March 2015
Maciej Dowbor	TV host	Withdrew on 14 March 2015
Rozalia Mancewicz	Miss Polonia 2010	Eliminated 3rd on 14 March 2015
Piotr Świerczewski	Football player	Eliminated 4th on 14 March 2015
Odeta Moro	TV hostess	Eliminated 5th on 14 March 2015
Elżbieta Jędrzejewska	Actress	Eliminated 6th on 21 March 2015
Bilguun Ariunbaatar	Comedian and TV host	Eliminated 7th on 21 March 2015
Monika Mrozowska	Actress	Eliminated 8th on 21 March 2015
Robert Moskwa	Actor	Eliminated 9th on 28 March 2015
Dorota Czaja	Dancer and actress	Eliminated 10th on 28 March 2015
Włodzimierz Matuszak	Actor	Eliminated 11th on 28 March 2015
Dariusz Kuźniak	Cook and Top Chef contestant	Eliminated 12th on 4 April 2015
Aleksandra Ciupa	Model	Eliminated 13th on 4 April 2015
Tomasz Puzon	Karateka	Eliminated 14th on 11 April 2015
Przemysław Cypryański	Actor	Eliminated 15th on 11 April 2015
Andrzej Młynarczyk	Actor	Eliminated 16th on 18 April 2015
Adam Kraśko	Reality TV star	Eliminated 17th on 18 April 2015
Radosław Liszewski	Disco polo singer	Eliminated 18th on 18 April 2015
Andrzej Supron	Wrestler	Eliminated 19th on 18 April 2015
Julia Wróblewska	Actress	Eliminated 20th on 25 April 2015
Saszan	Singer and blogger	Third place on 25 April 2015
Misheel Jargalsajkhan	Actress	Runner-up on 25 April 2015
Andrzej Szczęsny	Alpine skier	Winner on 25 April 2015

== Scoring chart ==
Celebrity	Place	Wk 1	Wk 2	Wk 3	Wk 4	Wk 5	Wk 6	Wk 7	Wk 8
Andrzej Szczęsny	1	—	—	28	—	—	30	28	26
Misheel Jargalsajkhan	2	—	—	—	28	—	29	30	30
Saszan	3	—	25	—	—	30	—	22	23
Julia Wróblewska	4	—	—	—	24	—	15	23	16
Andrzej Supron	5	—	—	30	—	—	30	28	
Radosław Liszewski	6	—	24	—	—	25	—	28	
Adam Kraśko	7	17	—	—	—	10	—	13	
Andrzej Młynarczyk	8	17	30^{1}	—	—	23	—	20	
Przemysław Cypryański	9	—	—	29	—	—	24		
Tomasz Puzon	10	—	—	—	27	—	21		
Aleksandra Ciupa	11	14	—	—	—	16			
Dariusz Kuźniak	12	29	—	—	—	24			
Włodzimierz Matuszak	13	—	—	—	24				
Dorota Czaja	14	—	—	—	24				
Robert Moskwa	15	—	—	—	25				
Monika Mrozowska	16	—	—	25					
Bilguun Ariunbaatar	17	—	—	8					
Elżbieta Jędrzejewska	18	—	—	19					
Odeta Moro	19	—	30						
Piotr Świerczewski	20	—	29						
Rozalia Mancewicz	21	—	13						
Maciej Dowbor	22	—	WD						
Ilona Felicjańska	23	26							
Przemysław Saleta	24	17							

Indicates the celebrity safe in the Splash-off that week.
Indicates the celebrity eliminated in the Splash-off that week.
Indicates the celebrity eliminated that week.
Indicates the winning celebrity.
Indicates the runner-up celebrity.
Indicates the third place celebrity.
The diver withdrew from the competition.
Red numbers indicate the lowest score for each week.
Green numbers indicate the highest score for each week.
"—" The celebrity did not dive that week.

^1 Andrzej Młynarczyk was eliminated in episode one. He returned in episode two replacing Maciej Dowbor, who withdrew because of an injury.

== Average score chart ==
This table only counts for dives scored on a traditional 30-points scale.

Rank by average	Place	Celebrity	Total points	Number of dives	Average
1	19	Odeta Moro	30	1	30.0
2	5	Andrzej Supron	88	3	29.3
3	2	Misheel Jargalsajkhan	117	4	29.3
3	20	Piotr Świerczewski	29	1	29.0
5	1	Andrzej Szczęsny	112	4	28.0
6	9	Przemysław Cypryański	53	2	26.5
6	12	Dariusz Kuźniak	53	2	26.5
8	23	Ilona Felicjańska	26	1	26.0
9	6	Radosław Liszewski	77	3	25.7
9	3	Saszan	100	3	25.0
11	15	Robert Moskwa	25	1	25.0
11	16	Monika Mrozowska	25	1	25.0
13	10	Tomasz Puzon	48	2	24.0
13	13	Włodzimierz Matuszak	24	1	24.0
13	14	Dorota Czaja	24	1	24.0
16	8	Andrzej Młynarczyk	90	4	22.5
17	4	Julia Wróblewska	78	4	19.5
18	18	Elżbieta Jędrzejewska	19	1	19.0
19	24	Przemysław Saleta	17	1	17.0
20	11	Aleksandra Ciupa	30	2	15.0
21	7	Adam Kraśko	40	3	13.3
22	21	Rozalia Mancewicz	13	1	13.0
23	17	Bilguun Ariunbaatar	8	1	8.0
24	22	Maciej Dowbor	0	0	0.0

== Live show details ==
=== Week 1 (7 March) ===
Order	Celebrity	Judges' scores			Total	Height	Result
Order	Celebrity	Otylia	Tomasz	Danuta	Total	Height	Result
1	Przemysław Saleta	4	6	7	17	10-metre	Eliminated
2	Aleksandra Ciupa	3	5	6	14	5-metre	Saved by the judges
3	Andrzej Młynarczyk	4	6	7	17	7.5-metre	Eliminated by the judges
4	Ilona Felicjańska	7	9	10	26	7.5-metre	Eliminated
5	Dariusz Kuźniak	9	10	10	29	7.5-metre	Safe
6	Adam Kraśko	4	6	7	17	5-metre	Safe

Judges' votes to save

- Otylia: Aleksandra Ciupa
- Tomasz: Andrzej Młynarczyk
- Danuta: Aleksandra Ciupa

=== Week 2 (14 March) ===
Order	Celebrity	Judges' scores			Total	Height	Result
Order	Celebrity	Otylia	Tomasz	Danuta	Total	Height	Result
1	Piotr Świerczewski	9	10	10	29	7.5-metre	Eliminated
2	Rozalia Mancewicz	4	4	5	13	3-metre	Eliminated
3	Radosław Liszewski	8	7	9	24	10-metre	Saved by the judges
4	Odeta Moro	10	10	10	30	5-metre	Eliminated by the judges
5	Maciej Dowbor	—	—	—	—	—	Withdrew
6	Andrzej Młynarczyk	10	10	10	30	7.5-metre	Safe
7	Saszan	8	8	9	25	7.5-metre	Safe

Judges' votes to save

- Otylia: Radosław Liszewski
- Tomasz: Odeta Moro
- Danuta: Radosław Liszewski

=== Week 3 (21 March) ===
Order	Celebrity	Judges' scores			Total	Height	Result
Order	Celebrity	Otylia	Tomasz	Danuta	Total	Height	Result
1	Elżbieta Jędrzejewska	4	7	8	19	3-metre	Eliminated
2	Bilguun Ariunbaatar	1	3	4	8	3-metre	Eliminated
3	Monika Mrozowska	7	9	9	25	5-metre	Eliminated by the judges
4	Andrzej Szczęsny	8	10	10	28	10-metre	Safe
5	Przemysław Cypryański	9	10	10	29	7.5-metre	Saved by the judges
6	Andrzej Supron	10	10	10	30	10-metre	Safe

Judges' votes to save

- Otylia: Przemysław Cypryański
- Tomasz: Przemysław Cypryański
- Danuta: Przemysław Cypryański

=== Week 4 (28 March) ===
Order	Celebrity	Judges' scores			Total	Height	Result
Order	Celebrity	Otylia	Tomasz	Danuta	Total	Height	Result
1	Julia Wróblewska	7	8	9	24	5-metre	Safe
2	Robert Moskwa	7	9	9	25	3-metre	Eliminated
3	Micheel Jargalsaikhan	8	10	10	28	3-metre	Safe
4	Dorota Czaja	6	9	9	24	5-metre	Eliminated
5	Włodzimierz Matuszak	6	8	10	24	7.5-metre	Eliminated by the judges
6	Tomasz Puzon	8	9	10	27	10-metre	Saved by the judges

Judges' votes to save

- Otylia: Tomasz Puzon
- Tomasz: Tomasz Puzon
- Danuta: Włodzimierz Matuszak

=== Week 5 (4 April) ===
Order	Celebrity	Judges' scores			Total	Height	Result
Order	Celebrity	Otylia	Tomasz	Danuta	Total	Height	Result
1	Aleksandra Ciupa	5	5	6	16	5-metre	Eliminated
2	Radosław Liszewski	7	9	9	25	10-metre	Safe
3	Andrzej Młynarczyk	7	8	8	23	7.5-metre	Safe
4	Saszan	10	10	10	30	5-metre	Safe
5	Dariusz Kuźniak	7	8	9	24	10-metre	Eliminated
6	Adam Kraśko	2	4	4	10	7.5-metre	Safe

=== Week 6 (11 April) ===
Order	Celebrity	Judges' scores			Total	Height	Result
Order	Celebrity	Otylia	Tomasz	Danuta	Total	Height	Result
1	Przemysław Cypryański	7	8	9	24	10-metre	Eliminated
2	Julia Wróblewska	4	5	6	15	5-metre	Safe
3	Tomasz Puzon	6	7	8	21	10-metre	Eliminated
4	Misheel Jargalsajkhan	9	10	10	29	10-metre	Safe
5	Andrzej Supron	10	10	10	30	7.5-metre	Safe
6	Andrzej Szczęsny	10	10	10	30	10-metre	Safe

=== Week 7 (18 April) ===
Order	Celebrity	Judges' scores			Total	Height	Result
Order	Celebrity	Otylia	Tomasz	Danuta	Total	Height	Result
1	Andrzej Młynarczyk	6	7	7	20	5-metre	Eliminated
2	Misheel Jargalsajkhan	10	10	10	30	10-metre	Safe
3	Radosław Liszewski	9	9	10	28	10-metre	Eliminated
4	Andrzej Szczęsny	8	10	10	28	10-metre	Safe
5	Saszan	6	7	9	22	7.5-metre	Safe
6	Adam Kraśko	3	5	5	13	5-metre	Eliminated
7	Julia Wróblewska	7	8	8	23	3-metre	Safe
8	Andrzej Supron	8	10	10	28	7.5-metre	Eliminated

=== Week 8 (25 April) ===
Order	Celebrity	Judges' scores			Total	Height	Result
Order	Celebrity	Otylia	Tomasz	Danuta	Total	Height	Result
	Misheel Jargalsajkhan	10	10	10	30	10-metre	2nd place
	Saszan	8	7	8	23		3rd place
	Andrzej Szczęsny	8	9	9	26		Winner
	Julia Wróblewska	5	5	6	16		4th place

== Viewing figures ==
Episode	1st edition
1	2 694 174 (7 March 2015)
2	1 940 710 (14 March 2015)
3	2 010 835 (21 March 2015)
4	1 917 188 (28 March 2015)
5	2 017 269 (4 April 2015)
6	1 850 175 (11 April 2015)
7	2 198 208 (18 April 2015)
8	2 036 253 (25 April 2015)
Average viewing	2 069 404
