= Valery Solovei =

Russian historian and professor (born 1960)

- Валерий Соловей
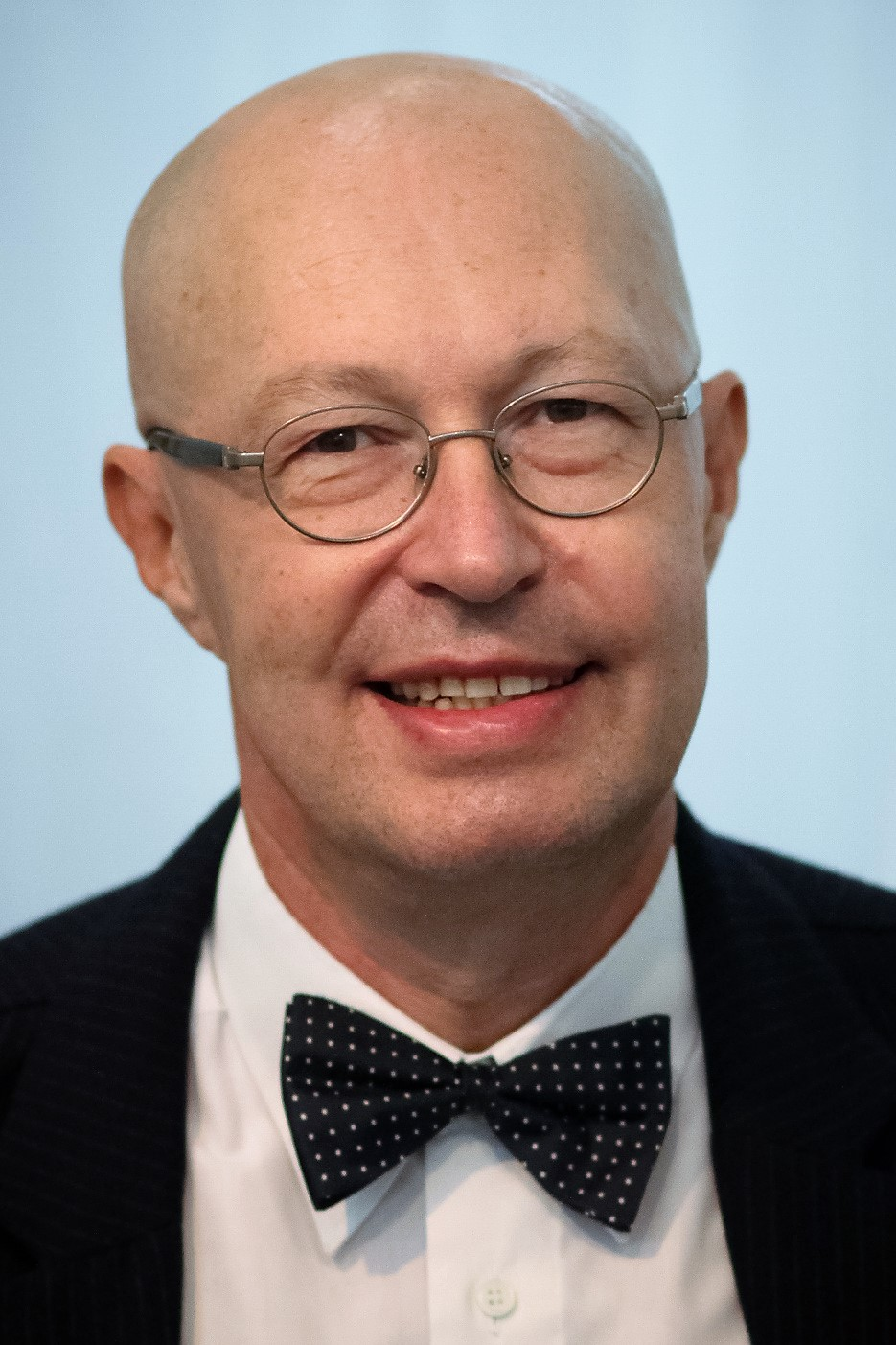
- Solovei in 2011
- Born: Валерий Дмитриевич Соловей; August 19, 1960 (age 66); Shchastia, Luhansk Oblast, Ukrainian SSR, Soviet Union
- Education: Moscow State University
- Occupations: Blogging, lecturing, writing, researching about political science
- Known for: Predicting an imminent end of Putin's regime, claiming that Putin is dead
- Website: YouTube channel

Valery Dmitriyevich Solovei (born 19 August 1960) is a Russian historian, political scientist and conspiracy theorist, who served as the professor and head of the Public Relations Department at the Moscow State Institute of International Relations (MGIMO). He resigned from MGIMO on June 19, 2019.

On 27 October 2023 Solovei announced that Putin had died on Thursday, October 26, from complications of cancer. According to Solovei, the Putin we see now is actually his body double who has been replacing Putin during last several months on some meetings.

== Political forecasts ==
Solovei is known for his political forecasts. Some of his predictions about changes in the Russian leadership turned out to be accurate. In 2016, he predicted the appointments of Anton Vaino and Vyacheslav Volodin as the Kremlin Chief of Staff and the Chairman of the State Duma, respectively. In January 2022, Solovey correctly predicted the Russian invasion of Ukraine, but had previously claimed that a major war between Russia and Ukraine was "out of question". Solovei also incorrectly predicted a Russian attack on the Baltic states in 2019 and 2020.

In 2016, Solovei predicted limitations on leaving Russia and the introduction of a tourist exit tax after the 2016 Russian legislative election, which did not happen.

Since 2017, Solovei has regularly predicted an imminent end of Putin's regime in Russia:.

Date of comment by Solovei	Suggested time frame of changes	Quote (translation from Russian)
8 September 2017	2019–2020	"Putin will leave according to Yeltsin's scenario in two or three years"
30 December 2018	2021–2022	"A large-scale political crisis will begin at the end of 2019, it will last 2-3 years and will end with the removal of the current regime from power and the re-establishment of Russia"
24 December 2019	2020	"Putin will leave in 2020, he will be replaced by Medvedev"
13 June 2020	2022	"Already in 2022 we will not see him [Putin] in politics — not Russian and not international"
23 December 2020	2021	"In 2021, Putin will leave and he will absolutely have to leave his post"
23 September 2021	2021–2023	"Putin will resign as president before 2024"
23 December 2022	Spring 2023	"In the spring [2023] Putin will be forced to leave the Kremlin"
23 October 2023	Autumn 2023	"Putin will not live to see the end of autumn"

The rumors about Putin's deteriorating health started by Solovei were subsequently published many times in the Russian-language and English-language press.
