= The Londoners (TV series) =

Polish-British drama television series

- The DVD cover of the first season.
- Genre: Drama
- Written by: Ewa Popiołek; Marek Kreutz
- Directed by: Maciej Migas; Greg Zglinski
- Composer: Radosław Łuka
- Countries of origin: Poland; United Kingdom
- Original languages: Polish; English
- No. of seasons: 2
- No. of episodes: 29

Production
- Producers: Marcin Marcinkiewicz; Rafał Golis; Joanna Strzelecka; Marios Hamboulides
- Cinematography: Tomasz Dobrowolski
- Editors: Leszek Starzyński; Maciej Pawliński
- Running time: 45 minutes
- Production company: Telemark

Original release
- Network: TVP1
- Release: 23 October 2008 – 23 December 2009

The Londoners (Polish: Londyńczycy [lɔnˈdɘ̟ɲ.t͡ʂɘ̟.t͡sɘ̟]) is a drama television series directed by Maciej Migas and Greg Zglinski, and written by Ewa Popiołek and Marek Kreutz. It has 2 seasons of 29 episodes, which originally aired from 23 October 2008 to 23 December 2009 on TVP1. The series focuses on the lives of an ensemble cast of first-generation Polish immigrants living in London, United Kingdom, with a mixture of dialogue in Polish and English.

== Premise ==
The series focuses on the lives of an ensemble cast of first-generation Polish immigrants living in London, United Kingdom.

== Cast ==
=== Main roles ===
- Natalia Rybicka as Asia Budzisz
- Lesław Żurek as Andrzej
- Robert Więckiewicz as Marcin Malec (main in season 1, guest starring in season 2)
- Gabriela Muskała as Ewa Malec
- Michał Włodarczyk as Staś Malec
- Rafał Maćkowiak as Paweł
- Marietta Żukowska as Maria Rost (guest starring in season 1, main in season 2)
- Marcin Bosak as Wojtek Górski
- Kamila Baar as Kasia
- Przemysław Sadowski as Darek Michalski
- Grażyna Barszczewska as Nina Strzegomska
- Roma Gąsiorowska as Mariola Biedrzycka

=== Other roles ===
- Selva Rasalingam as Zayed Rampal
- Marcin Tyrol as Roman
- Małgorzata Buczkowska as Wiola
- James Doherty as Alvin Fox
- Dominic Cazenove as Peter
- Maja Bohosiewicz as Kinga
- Janusz Chabior as Jacek
- Michał Czernecki as Robal
- Przemyslaw Redkowski as a worker
- Nadia Aldridge as Kate
- Allan Hale as Miguel Ribeiro
- Sławomir Orzechowski as Wiesio
- Ryan Hurst as James Dyer
- Marcin Juchniewicz as Russian person
- Dariusz Juzyszyn as Misza
- Nicholas Kipriano as Ali
- David Price as John Brown
- Julia Balsewicz as Iza
- Sylwia Juszczak as Justyna
- Weronika Rosati as Weronika Fox
- Fionnuala Ellwood as Annabelle
- David Broughton-Davies
- Maurice Byrne as Edward Watson, an actor
- Zbigniew Borek as Budzisz, Asia's father
- Michał Sitarski as Tomasz Skowronek
- Piotr Borowski as Rumun
- Oliver Gilbert as John, a teacher
- Joanna Hole as Janis
- Grzegorz Jurkiewicz
- Patricia Kazadi as Helen Hobbs, a receptionist
- Zbigniew Konopka as a worker
- Mehdi Rezvan as Hamid
- Rakel Dimar as Mary
- Zygmunt Malanowicz as Władek
- Anita Wright as Emily
- Weronika Książkiewicz as Agnieszka
- Kacper Kowalski as Willy
- Aleksandra Konieczna as Basia
- Katarzyna Figura as Elizabeth
- Rui Carlos Ferreira as Edilson Ribeiro
- Gareth Llewelyn as Steven
- Philip Michael as Jamal
- Nathan Lewis as Tanzan
- Victor Perel as Lifesaver
- Harry Napier as Brian

== Production ==
The series was written by Ewa Popiołek and Marek Kreutz, who, to prepare themselves, spent several weeks among Polish families of immigrants in London, United Kingdom. It was created by the company Telemark; directed by Maciej Migas and Greg Zglinski; and produced by Marcin Marcinkiewicz, Rafał Golis, Joanna Strzelecka, and Marios Hamboulides. The cinematography was done by Tomasz Dobrowolski, editing by Leszek Starzyński, music by Radosław Łuka, scenography by Jacek Turewicz and Wojciech Saloni-Marczewski, costumes by Dominika Gebel, and characterisation by Iwona Kajszczak and Tomasz Matraszek. The main cast included Grażyna Barszczewska, Robert Więckiewicz, Przemysław Sadowski, Rafał Maćkowiak, Lesław Żurek, Roma Gąsiorowska, Karolina Kominek-Skuratowicz, Maja Bohosiewicz, and Michał Włodarczyk. Around half of the scenes were shot in London, England, in the neighbourhoods of Soho, City, Canary Wharf, Ealing, and West End, while the rest were shot in Poland. The series originally aired on TVP1, with its first season consisting of 13 episodes airing from 23 October 2008 to 29 January 2009, and its second season of 16 episodes, from 10 September to 23 December 2009. On 20 May 2010, the Polish Television (TVP) had announced that the series was cancelled.

== Episodes ==
Season	Episodes	Originally released		
Season	Episodes	First released	Last released	Network
1	13	23 October 2008	16 January 2009	TVP1
2	16	10 September 2009	23 December 2009	TVP1
