= Michał Włodarczyk =

Polish actor (born 1995)

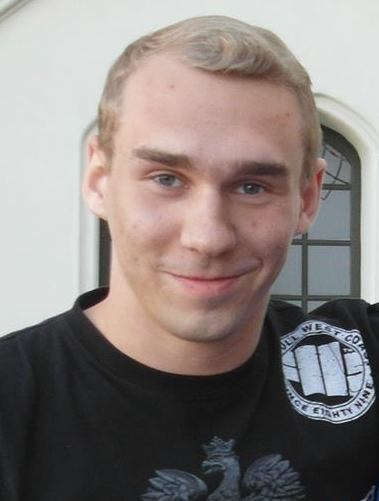
- Michał Włodarczyk in 2015.
- Born: 27 September 1995 (age 30); Warsaw, Poland
- Occupation: Actor
- Years active: 2005–present

Michał Włodarczyk (Polish: [ˈmi.xaw vwɔˈdar.t͡ʂɘ̟k]; born 27 September 1995) is a film and television actor.

== Biography ==
Michał Włodarczyk was born on 27 September 1995 in Warsaw, Poland.

His acting debut was in 2005, with a minor role in film Przybyli ułani. From 2007 to 2009, he portrayed Wojtek in Foster Family, and from 2008 to 2009, Stanisław Malec in The Londoners. He also appeared in the films such as Yob, or The Last Brain Cell (2006), Ladies (2008), The Citizen (2014), 7 rzeczy, których nie wiecie o facetach (2016), and Afterimage (2016), Asymetry (2020), Bad Boy (2020), Dad (2022), Prophet (2022), Pilecki's Report (2023), and Saint (2023), and television series such as Pensjonat pod Różą (2005–2006), Faceci do wzięcia (2007–2008), Plebania (2009), Aida (2011), Na Wspólnej (2015), Father Matthew (2015, 2018), First Love (2018), Conspirators (2021), Hold Tight (2022), and BringBackAlice (2023).

He also trains the mixed martial arts, and in 2017, he had the second place at the MMA Amateur League Polish Championship.

== Filmography ==
=== Films ===
Year	Title	Role	Notes
2005	Przybyli ułani	Jadwiga's father as a child	
2006	Yob, or The Last Brain Cell	Young Pele	
2006	Trójka do wzięcia	Kacper	Short film
2006	Sezon na kaczki	Tomasz	Short film
2007	Braciszek	Baker's son	
2007	Doktor Halina	Boy	Television play
2008	Ladies	Tybinkowski	
2008	Luksus	Mały	Short film
2009	Siemiany	Michał	Short film
2014	The Citizen	Vocational school student	
2016	7 rzeczy, których nie wiecie o facetach	Hooligan	
2016	Adaptacja	Michał	Short film
2017	Afterimage	Citizen's Militia officer	
2017	Dzikie róże		
2017	Czuwaj	Piotr	
2019	Supernova	Teenager	
2019	Women of Mafia 2	Club party attendant	
2020	Bad Boy	Karpiński "Karp"	
2020	Asymetry	Gruszka	
2021	Furioza	Nochal	
2021	Girls to Buy	Hip hop music enthusiast	
2021	The Day I Found a Girl in a Trash	Man	
2022	Dad	Sikor	
2022	Prophet	Łysy	
2023	Saint	Grzesiek Leszczyński	
2023	Pilecki's Report	Gerhard Lachmann	

=== Television series ===
Year	Title	Role	Notes
2005	Crime Detectives	Boy from Praga	Episode: "Powrót" (no. 37)
2005–2006	Pensjonat pod Różą	Krystian	Recurring role; 16 episodes
2007–2008	Faceci do wzięcia	Antoni	2 episode
2007–2009	Foster Family	Wojtek	50 episodes
2008–2009	The Londoners	Stanisław Malec	13 episodes
2009	Przystań	Bartosz	Episode: "Sens życia" (no. 10)
2009	Plebania	Marek	2 episodes
2011	Warsaw Pact	Boy	Episode no. 4
2011	Aida	Stefaniak	2 episodes
2012	True Law	Dominik Molski	Episode no. 6
2015	Na Wspólnej	Grzegorz Turos	9 episodes
2015	Father Matthew	Michał Wolski	Episode: "Reportaż z domu" (no. 168)
2018	Father Matthew	Igor Stępień	Episode: "Sparing" (no. 244)
2017	Druga szansa	Sebastian	Episode: "Tylko winni się tłumaczą" (no. 3)
2018	Mecenas Lena Barska	Arkadiusz Chojnacki	2 episodes
2018	First Love	Sebastian	
2018	L for Love	Jarek's friend	2 episodes
2018	Na dobre i na złe	Football hooligan	Episode: "Gdzie nasz dom?" (no. 715)
2023	Na dobre i na złe	Radek Białostocki	Episode: "Zagrać siłacza" (no. 868)
2018–2020	The Crown of the Kings	Niestrasz	4 episodes
2019	The Pleasure Principle	"First"	Episode no. 8
2019	Odwróceni. Ojcowie i córki	Drug diller	Episode no. 3
2019	Conspirators	Konieczny	2 episodes
2019	Women of Mafia 2	Club party attendant	1 episode
2019	Heartbeat	Łukasz	Episode no. 4
2020	Bad Boy	Karpiński "Karp"	
2021	Furioza	Nochal	
2021	The Archivist	Hooligan	Episode: "Formuła" (no. 3)
2022	Hold Tight	Hooligan	4 episodes
2023	BringBackAlice	Sebastian	Episode no. 1
