= Kino Polska =

- Country: Poland

Programming
- Language: Polish
- Picture format: 576i (16:9 SDTV); 1080i (HDTV)

Ownership
- Owner: SPI International Polska

History
- Launched: 20 December 2003; 22 years ago (SD); 3 December 2018 (HD)

Links
- Website: www.kinopolska.pl

Availability

Terrestrial
- Polish Digital: TV Mobilna - MUX 4 (pay)

Kino Polska is a television channel which broadcasts Polish movies and series. For a while, the TV station aired Polish animated shows including Hip-Hip and Hurra, which made its debut there. In 2025 cartoons has been returned after a long hiatus since 2012.
