= Misheel Jargalsaikhan =

Polish actress

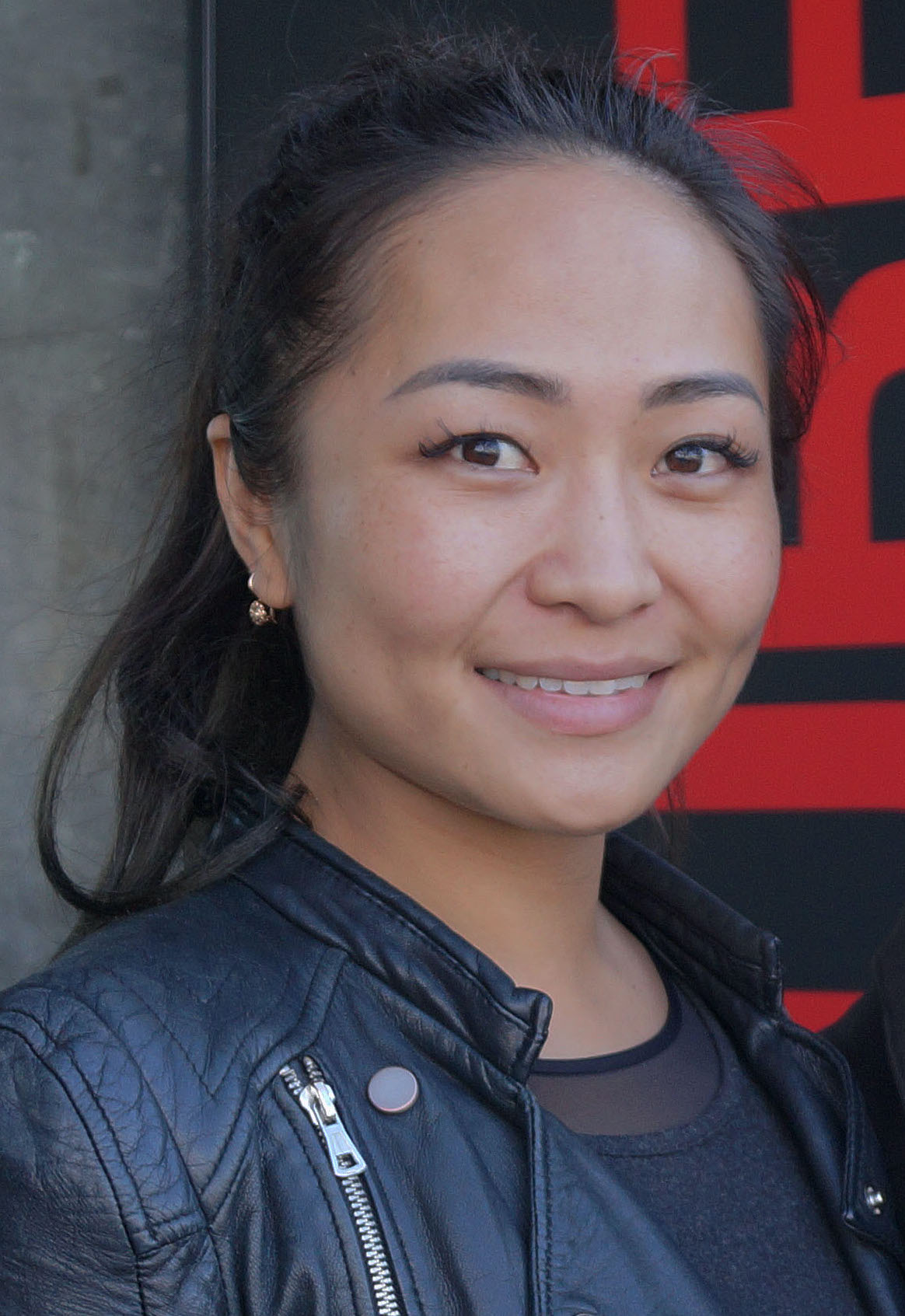
- Misheel Jargalsaikhan in 2016.
- Born: 9 October 1988 (age 37); Ulaanbaatar, Mongolia
- Occupations: Physician, actress
- Years active: 1999–2007, 2015–present

Misheel Jargalsaikhan (Note: Mongolian: Жаргалсайхан Мишээл [t͡ʃarɣəɬsæɛχəŋ miɕeːɮ], transcription: Jargalsaikhan Misheel) (born 9 November 1988) is a Polish-Mongolian physician and actress. She is best known from portraying Zosia in television series Foster Family (1999–2009).

== Biography ==
=== Childhood ===
Misheel Jargalsaikhan was born on 9 November 1988 in Ulaanbaatar, Mongolia. Her family moved to Poland in 1991 when she was 3 years old. Her mother was a physician. Misheel has a younger brother. They lived in Chojnice, Pomeranian Voivodeship, and in 1999, they moved to Warsaw, Masovian Voivodeship.

=== Career ===
Jargalsaikhan begun her career as a child actress in 1999, when she was cast as Zosia, one of main roles in Polsat television series Foster Family. In 2006 and 2007 she also portrayed a recurring role of Kim Ksu, in TVP2 television series Pogoda na piątek. In 2007, she left Foster Family, ended her acting career, and begun studying medicine in Wrocław, eventually becoming a physician.

She returned to television in 2015, participating in game shows Celebrity Splash! In 2015, and Dancing with the Stars. Taniec z gwiazdami in 2016. In 2016 she also portrayed role of Nina Szatan in an episode of Wmiksowani.pl webseries. Later, in 2021 and 2022, she portrayed a recurring role of Yu Phan in TVN television series BrzydUla.

== Filmography ==
Year	Title	Role	Notes	Ref.
1999–2007	Foster Family	Zosia	Main role; 230 episodes	
2005	Rozmowy w toku	Herself	Talk show; 1 episode	
2006–2007	Pogoda na piątek	Kim Ksu	Recruiting role; 13 episodes	
2015	Celebrity Splash!	Herself	Game show	
2016	Dancing with the Stars. Taniec z gwiazdami	Herself	Game show	
2016	Wmiksowani.pl	Nina Szatan	Episode no. 10	
2021	Fort Boyard	Herself	Game show	
2021–2022	BrzydUla	Yu Phan	Recurring role; 20 episodes	
