= Jarosław Boberek =

Polish actor

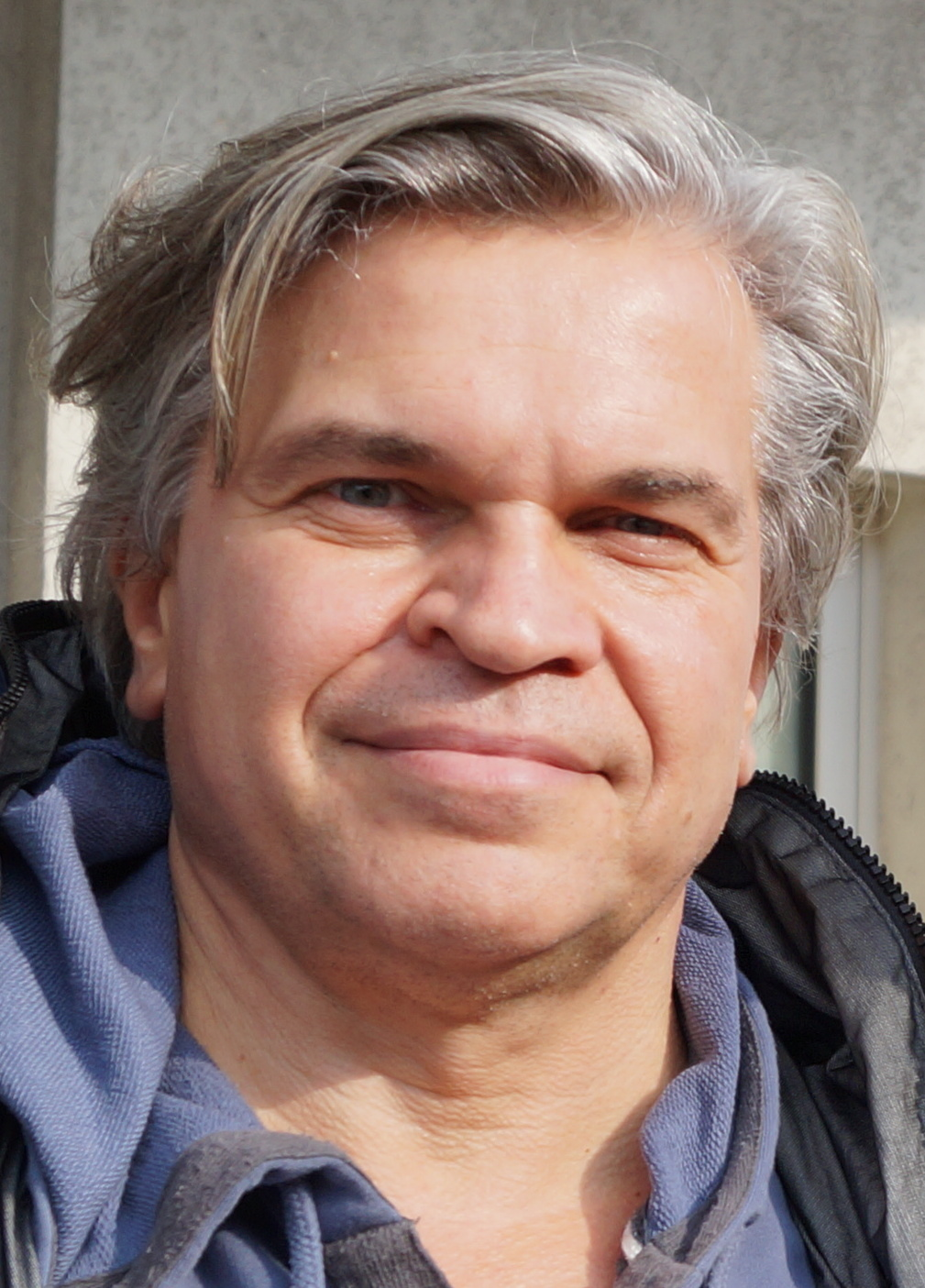
- Boberek in 2016
- Born: 14 June 1963 (age 62); Szczecinek, Poland
- Occupation: Actor
- Years active: 1988-present
- Spouse: Ilona Kucińska
- Children: 3

Jarosław Boberek (born 14 June 1963) is a Polish actor. He is the most popular voice actor in Poland for dubbing Donald Duck as well as King Julien in the Madagascar movies.

== Private life ==
He is married to Ilona Kucińska, They have two sons, named Franciszek and Jan. Jarosław Boberek has a third son, Mateusz, from a previous marriage.

== Filmography ==
Actor

- 2021: Squared Love as director
- 2017: The Chairman's Ear as Janek, chairman's cousin (ep. 7, 14, 42)
- 2015: Na dobre i na złe as Bernard (ep. 598-599, 603)
- 2014: Ojciec Mateusz as waiter Paweł (ep. 152)
- 2011: Battle of Warsaw 1920 as uhlan Paproch
- 2010-2012: Barwy szczęścia as Radosław Kolanko candidate for mayor, Marczak's opponent
- 2008-2015 Ojciec Mateusz as barman Władysław Filipiak (ep. 9, 19, 63, 129, 138, 139, 175)
- 2007-2008: Twarzą w twarz as Borzęcki, CBŚ officer
- 2007: Halo Hans! as Agent Reinchard, double Adolf Hitler
- 2006: Pod powierzchnią
- 2005-2008: Pitbull as Robert „Robo” Zawadzki
- 2004: Na dobre i na złe as homeless (ep. 203)
- 2003: Łowcy skór as Zenek, worker of Kamińska's undertake
- 2002: To tu, to tam as Kuba
- 2002: Where Eskimos Live as truck driver
- 2002: The Hexer as Yarpen Zigrin (ep. 4)
- 2002-2003: Psie serce as voice of dog Mars
- 2001: Pieniądze to nie wszystko as late farmer on blockade
- 2001: The Hexer as Yarpen Zigrin
- 2000-2001: Przeprowadzki as constable Pyć
- 1999-2009: Rodzina zastępcza as friendly policeman
- 1999: Ostatnia misja as Goebbels, man of Bruno
- 1999: Córy szczęścia as policeman
- 1999: 4 w 1 as Bolek
- 1998-2003: Miodowe lata as dodger
- 1997: Boża podszewka as bandit
- 1997-1998: 13. posterunek as gay (ep. 16)
- 1997: Bride of War as member of AK
- 1997: Sława i chwała
- 1997: Krok as commander
- 1996: Wirus as policeman
- 1996: The Secret of Sagal jako porter
- 1996: Awantura o Basię as Józef, caretaker in Tańska's home
- 1995: Pułkownik Kwiatkowski as Kapitan Bąkiewicz (captain Bąkiewicz) w voivodeship squad of UB
- 1995: Ekstradycja
- 1995: Cwał
- 1995: Gracze as cab driver on Okęcie
- 1995: Ekstradycja
- 1995: Sukces... as worker of Morawski Electronics
- 1994: Spółka rodzinna as member of renovation team
- 1993: Czterdziestolatek. 20 lat później as boy on impotent Cricoland
- 1993: Łowca. Ostatnie starcie as policeman
- 1980-2000: Dom as cab driver carrying Szczepan

== Dubbing in Polish ==
Movies

- 2011; Hip-Hip and Hurra - Peacock, Hummingbird, Squirl, Bear Dad, Bear son, Ostrage, Crane;
- 2011: Kung Fu Panda 2 – Monkey
- 2011: Gnomeo i Julia – Benny
- 2011: Gwiezdne wojny: część IV - Nowa nadzieja
- 2011: Jeż Jerzy – Asystent
- 2011: Rango – Rockeye
- 2011: Sezon na misia 3 – Bodzio
- 2010: Shrek ma wielkie oczy – scared man
- 2010: Potwory kontra Obcy: Dynie-mutanty z kosmosu – Brakujące ogniwo (Missing link)
- 2010: Kung Fu Panda: Sekrety Potężnej Piątki – Mistrz Małpa (Master Monkey)
- 2010: Kung Fu Panda: Święta, święta i Po – Małpa (Monkey)
- 2010: Madagwiazdka – Król Julian (King Julian)
- 2010: Safari 3D – Chino
- 2010: Karate Kid – Pan Han
- 2010: Biała i Strzała podbijają kosmos – Lenek
- 2010: Jak ukraść księżyc – Vector
- 2010: Shrek 4
- 2010: Toy Story 3
- 2010: I'm in the Band - Burger Pitt
- 2010: Disco robaczki – Gnojak
- 2010: Nasza niania jest agentem – Bob
- 2010: Jeż Jerzy – Assistant
- 2009: Planeta 51 – Skiff
- 2009: Księżniczka i żaba
- 2009: Renifer Niko ratuje święta – Juliusz
- 2009: Załoga G − Blaster
- 2009: Potwory kontra Obcy − Brakujące Ogniwo (Missing Link)
- 2009: Hotel dla psów − Carl
- 2008: Pingwiny z Madagaskaru – Król Julian (King Julian)
- 2008: Madagaskar 2 − Król Julian (King Julian)
- 2008: Sezon na misia 2 − Boguś
- 2008: Łowcy smoków − Gruby John
- 2008: Wyprawa na Księżyc 3D − Poopchev
- 2008: Garfield: Festyn humoru – Stanislavski
- 2008: Speed Racer
- 2008: Małpy w kosmosie − Morda
- 2008: Kung Fu Panda − Małpa (Monkey)
- 2008: Asterix na olimpiadzie
- 2007: S.A.W. Szkolna Agencja Wywiadowcza – Lenny
- 2007: Lucky Luke na Dzikim Zachodzie − Piotr
- 2007: Pada Shrek –
  - One of the mouses
  - One of the pigs
- 2007: Don Chichot
- 2007: Alvin i wiewiórki
- 2007: Tom i Jerry: Dziadek do orzechów
- 2007: Film o pszczołach – Komar Mooseblood (Mooseblood Mosquito)
- 2007: Rodzinka Robinsonów
- 2007: Na fali – Jeżowiec
- 2007: 7 krasnoludków: Las to za mało − historia jeszcze prawdziwsza – Kozak
- 2006: Magiczna kostka – Tristan
- 2006: iCarly – Angel (episode 34)
- 2006: Kacper: Szkoła postrachu
- 2006: Po rozum do mrówek
- 2006: Tom i Jerry: Piraci i kudłaci
- 2006: Stefan Malutki – Pryszcz
- 2006: Artur i Minimki – Travel Agent
- 2006: Pajęczyna Charlotty – Krowa Elwyn
- 2006: Sposób na rekina − Bart
- 2006: Happy Feet: Tupot małych stóp – Ramon
- 2006: Dżungla
- 2006: Brzydkie kaczątko i ja – William
- 2006: Skok przez płot – Kot Tiger (Cat Tiger)
- 2006: Sezon na misia – Boguś (Boog Bear)
- 2006: Epoka lodowcowa 2: Odwilż
- 2006: Wpuszczony w kanał − Rybka / Pomocnik Ala Ropucha z zatkanym nosem (Fish / Al Ropuch's assistant with plugged nose)
- 2005: Madagaskar – Król Julian (King Julian)
- 2005: Magiczna karuzela – Dylan
- 2005: Tom i Jerry: Szybcy i kudłaci
- 2005: Zebra z klasą – Kogut Mędrek (Cock Mędrek)
- 2005: Szeregowiec Dolot – Heniek
- 2005: Kurczak Mały
- 2005: Charlie i fabryka czekolady – Store owner
- 2005: Czerwony Kapturek – prawdziwa historia – Lumberjack Kirk
- 2004: Rybki z ferajny – Lenny
- 2004: Ruchomy zamek Hauru – Calcifer
- 2004: Przygody lisa Urwisa – Brichemer
- 2004: W 80 dni dookoła świata – Passepartout
- 2004: Mickey: Bardziej bajkowe święta − Kaczor Donald (Donald Duck)
- 2004: Baśniowy Świat 6 – Kaczor Donald (Donald Duck)
- 2004: Baśniowy Świat 5 − Kaczor Donald
- 2004: Legenda telewizji
- 2004: Magiczny kamień – Galger
- 2004: Lucky Luke (Les Daltons) – Joe Dalton
- 2004: Gwiezdne jaja: Część I − Zemsta świrów –
  - Jim, cleaner spy
  - Winnetou
- 2004: Shrek 2 – Reporter programu Knajci
- 2004: Mickey, Donald, Goofy: Trzej muszkieterowie – Kaczor Donald (Donald Duck)
- 2003: Sindbad: Legenda siedmiu mórz - Szczur (Rat)
- 2003: Gdzie jest Nemo? – Jacques
- 2003: Baśniowy Świat 3 – Kaczor Donald (Donald Duck)
- 2003: Zapłata
- 2003: Dobry piesek – Bob
- 2003: Liga najgłupszych dżentelmenów
- 2003: Old School: Niezaliczona
- 2003: Opowieść o Zbawicielu – Święty Piotr (Saint Peter)
- 2003: 101 dalmatyńczyków II: Londyńska przygoda
- 2003: Piotruś Pan –
  - Pirates
  - Twardy Hrabia (Hard count)
  - Chief
  - Clerk
- 2002: Dzika rodzinka − Nigel
- 2002: Barbie jako Roszpunka –
  - Otto
  - Guard #1
- 2002: Mali agenci 2: Wyspa marzeń
- 2002: Królewska broda
- 2002: Planeta skarbów
- 2002: Tristan i Izolda – Baron Ganelon
- 2002: Smocze wzgórze – Tristan
- 2002: Epoka lodowcowa – Zeke
- 2002: Pinokio – Kot (Cat)
- 2002: Gwiezdne wojny: część II − Atak klonów –
  - Watto
  - Owen Lars
  - Droid #1
  - Ask Aak
- 2001: Spirited Away: W krainie bogów
- 2001: But Manitou jako Abahachi
- 2001: Shrek –
  - First blind mouse
  - One of Lord Farquaad's knights
- 2001: Atlantyda – Zaginiony ląd
- 1999: SpongeBob Kanciastoporty- Krol Neptun (King Neptune), Skalmir Maminsyn (Squilliam Fancyson)
- 1999: Kraina elfów
- 1999: Król sokołów
- 1999: Ed, Edd i Eddy - Ed
- 1999: Mickey: Bajkowe święta – Kaczor Donald (Donald Duck)
- 1998: Babe – świnka w mieście – Kiri
- 1998: Rodzina Addamsów: Zjazd rodzinny
- 1997: Herkules – Ból
- 1997: Pożyczalscy
- 1996: 101 dalmatyńczyków – Policeman
- 1996: Miłość i wojna
- 1995: Rob Roy − Cunningham
- 1994: Scooby Doo i baśnie z tysiąca i jednej nocy – Bubu
- 1994: Księżniczka łabędzi (TV version)
- 1994: Skoś trawnik tato, a dostaniesz deser
- 1993: Uwolnić orkę
- 1992: Tom i Jerry: Wielka ucieczka – Tom
- 1988: Yogi i inwazja kosmitów
- 1988: Judy Jetson i rockersi
- 1987: Kocia ferajna w Beverly Hills – Choo Choo
- 1987: Jetsonowie spotykają Flintstonów
- 1987: Miś Yogi i czarodziejski lot Świerkową Gęsią – Mirkin
- 1987: Wielka ucieczka Misia Yogi – Poper
- 1986: Amerykańska opowieść − he sang songs
- 1982: Tajemnica IZBY
- 1978: Władca Pierścieni – Gollum
- 1964: Miś Yogi: Jak się macie - Misia znacie? – Szaber
- 1961: 101 Dalmatyńczyków − Sierżant Czmych (Sergeant Tibbs) (1995 Version)
