= Ryszard Kierczyński =

Polish stage and film actor

- Born: Ryszard Kieliszczyk; 3 March 1902; Warsaw, Poland
- Died: 22 July 1971 (aged 69); Warsaw, Poland
- Occupation: Actor
- Spouse(s): Zofia Barwińska; Maria Garbowska-Kierczyńska
- Children: 2

Ryszard Kierczyński (3 March 1902 (estimated) - 22 December 1971) was a Polish stage and film actor. He was the son of Tomasz Kieliszczyk, a labourer, and his wife Bronisława. In 1919, he graduated from high school in Warsaw and went on to study sociology at the Free Polish University. In 1924, he joined Juliusz Osterwa's Theatre Reduta and remained there until 1926. From 1926 to 1927, he belonged to the theatre group based in Łódź.

From September 1927, he began to use the name Kierczyński.

During the Second World War, he took an active part in the underground movement.

== Death ==
Kieliszczyk died on 22 July 1971 in Warsaw, aged 69.
