= Stanisław Michalski =

Polish actor

- Born: Stanisław Zdzisław Michalski; 3 September 1932; Vilnius, Poland
- Died: 1 February 2011 (aged 78); Gdańsk, Poland
- Occupation: Actor
- Years active: 1951–2009

Stanisław Zdzisław Michalski (3 September 1932 – 1 February 2011) was a Polish actor. In 1974 he starred in the Academy Award-nominated film The Deluge which was directed by Jerzy Hoffman.
