= Alleged doubles of Vladimir Putin =

Claims about the Russian president having a double

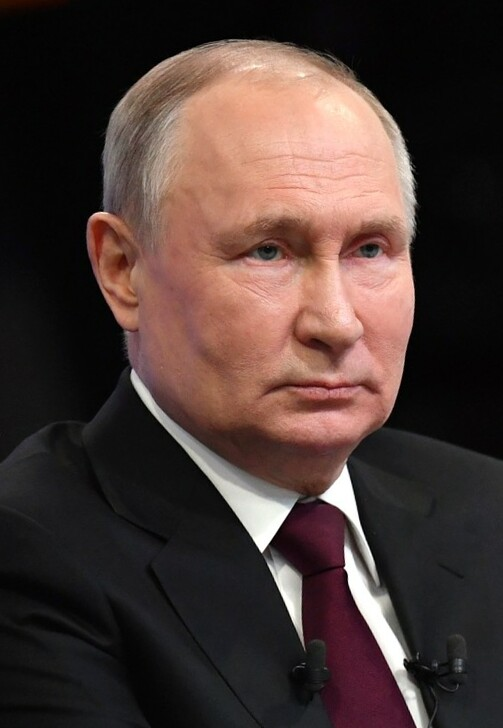
Vladimir Putin in December 2023

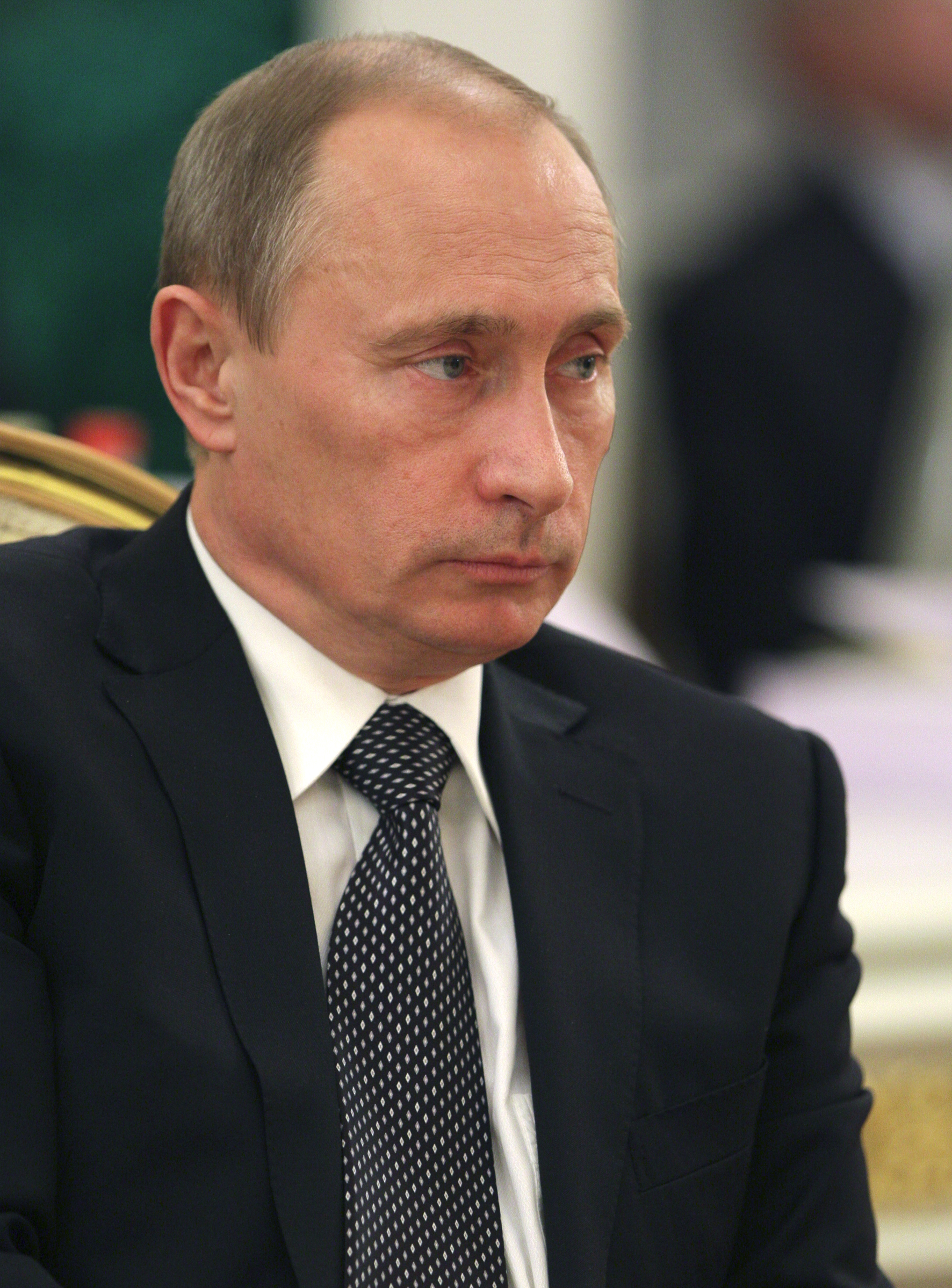
Putin in 2009

Conspiracy theories about body doubles used by Russian president Vladimir Putin are based on alleged instabilities in his appearance. Proponents believe that the "body doubles" have had surgery to resemble the "original" and point to facial features such as the chin, earlobes and wrinkles on his forehead as evidence, and claim that the body doubles were used because of Putin's allegedly declining health or that they were sent to areas deemed too dangerous for him.

The theory has been a deployed as a tool by opponents of Putin, including by Ukrainian media and officials, as well as British tabloids. Russia has denied these allegations, and no credible evidence has emerged of this theory.

== History ==
In December 2004, the Komsomolskaya Pravda reported on an offer to purchase Putin's "ancestral home" from an alleged body double from the village of Pominovo in Tver Oblast, where his parents were from. Over time, the topic of Putin's body doubles has remained a hot topic in the media environment, also sparking discussion on social media, for example, when pre-prepared news stories were published on Kremlin.ru at times of the president's temporary disappearance. Some Internet users speculated that Putin was relying on body doubles to hide his deteriorating health. Others believed that they were being sent to locations deemed too dangerous and risky for the "original". A third version says that Putin had supposedly already died, with his body doubles running the country.

In the 2010s, a meme with a table of the "original" Putin and six of his "body doubles" ("Babbler", "Udmurt", "Banquet", "Kuchma", "Bruise" and "Diplomat") with photos and descriptions of each became popular. According to the meme, each of the "body doubles" performs certain duties or has a distinguishing feature; for example, "Babbler" is deployed for Direct Line shows, "Diplomat" participates in negotiations, "Banquet" is used "for interviews, handshakes, and photos with the public", "Kuchma" is characterized by a "record-breaking chubby chin", and "Udmurt" is "basically the worst double ever", used when "Babbler" "needs a vacation". On 5 September 2016, Russian journalist Oleg Kashin posted the meme on his Facebook page, making it more popular.

In 2018, International Business Times called the allegations "one of the more unusual conspiracy theories" when a Twitter user quoted three photos of Putin taken on different dates and suggested that the politician was actually three different people.

In 2020, due to fears of COVID-19 contamination, Putin began taking precautions in meetings, which further intensified rumors of his alleged doubles.

=== Since 2022 ===
Conspiracy rumors about Putin's use of body doubles have increased during the Russo-Ukrainian war.

==== Ukrainian claims ====
Unsubstantiated rumors about Putin's doppelgangers are regularly published by Ukrainian media and discussed by high-ranking Ukrainian politicians.

In August 2022, Ukrainian military intelligence chief Kyrylo Budanov suggested on Ukrainian TV channel 1+1 that Putin's ears looked different in several of his public appearances: "The image of each person's ear is unique. It cannot be repeated." Ukrainian Major General Vadym Skibitsky also said Putin had been using body doubles to hide his allegedly deteriorating health.

A photo of Putin taken during his visit to Moscow State University on Russian Students Day in January 2023 intensified the spread of conspiracy theories. Jason J. Smart, a correspondent for the Ukrainian newspaper Kyiv Post, shared a photo from the visit, claiming that he "wears high heels" and that "most public events feature a lookalike - not the real Putin. The changes in his height, ears and weight are otherwise inexplicable."

For more than a year and a half, the president has mostly remained in Russia. However, since February 2023, Putin has become more active in close encounters (e.g., a rally in Luzhniki in February, a trip to occupied Mariupol in March, a meeting in Derbent in July 2023 shortly after the Prigozhin rebellion). Some of Putin's unusual engagements in 2023 have sparked public attention and raised questions about the possible use of double bodies. As Business Insider notes, a trip to occupied Mariupol, where Putin interacted with locals, renewed rumors that Putin used doubles for public appearances. The version of The Washington Post article about Putin's trip to Mariupol removed the mention of Putin using a double from the original article.

In March 2023, Anton Gerashchenko, an adviser to Ukraine's interior minister, tried to find evidence of Putin's body doubles by publishing three photos of Putin's chin and questioning whether the images showed the same person. Andriy Yusov, a spokesman for the Ukrainian Defense Ministry's GUR press service, also claimed that Putin didn't visit Mariupol and sent a body double there; this can allegedly be seen by the different chin in the photos. Fact-checking by Reuters, Snopes and Italian openFactChecking subsequently noted that the first image offered for comparison was published in 2020, not 2023; the second photo, like the third, was taken in Mariupol, not Sevastopol. Snopes concluded that the allegations were false.

In May 2023, Kyrylo Budanov noted: "There are at least three people [body doubles] who periodically appear." In June 2023, the Security Service of Ukraine compiled a guide on how to distinguish "body doubles" from each other.

In the spring of 2023, on the channel "Visiting Gordon," former KGB officer Sergei Zhirnov spoke about Putin's doubles who allegedly "live in a bunker" and "no one lets them out anywhere."

Rumors again intensified amid Putin's trip to Dagestan in June 2023. Experts say that while it's impossible to confirm the use of a doppelganger during that trip, the Russian president likely used a different approach to bolster his public image and demonstrate his willingness to relax his caution. Putin's appearance in Dagestan was also meant to demonstrate his popularity after Yevgeny Prigozhin's rebellion. The conspiracy theory was again spread against the backdrop of the Russian president's visit to China in October 2023.

==== "General SVR" ====
The Telegram channel "General SVR", allegedly closely linked to Russian political scientist and conspiracy theorist Valery Solovei, has actively promoted this conspiracy theory. According to it, the real Putin spends most of his time in a bunker and receives guests at a long table, while meetings with the public are supposedly attended by body doubles. In March 2023, "General SVR" noted that Putin had allegedly not been to Crimea or Mariupol and that a presidential body double had gone there "for a short visit and only for a video photo shoot."

Another unsubstantiated claim has also received widespread international publicity. It was published in October 2023, claiming that Putin's heart allegedly stopped on October 26 at 20:42 Moscow time, after which his corpse was placed in a "freezer" at his residence in Valdai Discussion Club, with Russian Security Council Secretary Nikolai Patrushev actually running the country, using Putin's "double" as a puppet. Solovei claimed that Putin's double, nicknamed "Vasilich," had visited China that same month.

Solovei has discussed Putin's serious illness since 2016, when he predicted Putin's imminent resignation due to "force majeure circumstances." The story about Putin's corpse in the refrigerator caused mostly only ridicule on the Internet.

=== Reaction of Russian authorities ===
In August 2000, Yevgeny Murov, head of the Russian Federal Security Service, said that Putin had no doubles. In 2001, Vladimir Putin denied rumors about his doubles.

In 2015, after a press conference, a journalist showed Putin a photo of a very similar person to him, to which he replied, "What double? I don't have doubles. Why do I need them?" In an interview with TASS published in February 2020, Putin admitted that he had been asked to use doppelgangers in the early 2000s "in the most difficult times of the fight against terrorism." However, he allegedly refused such a practice.

Russian presidential spokesman Dmitry Peskov has repeatedly refuted this conspiracy theory, claiming that Putin doesn't have any body doubles. In December 2021, he noted that Putin "smiles and laughs" when he is told about body doubles. On 20 April 2023, Peskov called the claims of a "Putin body double" traveling to Putin's headquarters "strange", and on 24 April, the issue of doubles "another lie." In October 2023, he called the rumors "information hoaxes" which evoked "nothing but a smile." On 4 November, he said that information about Putin's body doubles sometimes appears in Telegram channels and that "experts" are even interested in their number. He also noted: "We have only one Putin."

On 14 December 2023, during the year's edition of Direct Line with Vladimir Putin, when asked about the body doubles, Putin said that he "thought about it and decided that only one person should resemble myself and speak in my voice, and that person will be me."

== Analysis ==
The analysis of Russian-Latvian independent media Meduza using Amazon Rekognition, a neural network for face recognition and comparison, showed that the similarity of "body doubles" is from 99.6 to 99.9%, which contradicts the conspiracy theory itself.

Clinical psychologist Matvey Sokolovskiy notes that the peculiarity of the literary image of the double is its ability to reflect the dark aspects of the hero's personality, thus suggesting evil intentions, cruel and unjust actions. Thus, adherents of the conspiracy theory about Putin's doppelgangers may view the "real Russian president" as a kind and caring grandpa who refuses repression and military conflicts with neighboring states. In such a case, decision-making by the "fake" president signals that everything around him is also "fake," which Sokolovskiy believes may have a calming effect.

In June 2023, Japanese researchers in the field of facial recognition and voice identification concluded that Putin probably had at least one body double. Putin's participation at the 2023 Moscow Victory Day Parade was chosen as a baseline comparison. When analyzing facial features, the researchers found that the president who drove a Mercedes car across the Crimean Bridge in December 2022 matched Putin at the parade by only 53%, while the latter's resemblance to Putin who visited Mariupol in March 2023 was 40%. An analysis of the word "thank you" from Putin's speech at the Eurasian Economic Forum in May 2023 revealed "strong differences" in the pronunciation of some sounds, highlighting potential differences in the president's voice at different events.

Russian independent media Proekt examined Putin's participation in public events between November 2022 and November 2023. In December 2023, Proekt concluded that Putin's unexpected periodic violations of his strictly enforced coronavirus-related restrictions, which had led a number of "Kremlin pool" journalists interviewed on condition of anonymity to believe in the doppelganger theory, could be explained by the presidential campaign.

== People who look like Putin ==
A number of Russian and Russian-language media mentioned people who look like Vladimir Putin. They participate in various events, such as weddings and corporate parties, movies, humorous programs, and offer to take pictures with them for money. Anatoliy Gorbunov, Vasiliy Khorokhordin, Vladimir Belousov, Dmitriy Grachyov were mentioned among them. According to The Washington Post, Polish Sławomir Sobala was also globally known as a "fake Putin" for "being one of the most famous, if not the most famous, professional look-alike of the Russian president".

== See also ==
- Claims of Vladimir Putin's incapacity and death
- Political decoy
- Melania Trump replacement conspiracy theory
- Uday Hussein § Body double allegations
