= Aleksander Ihnatowicz =

Polish programmer and retired actor (born 1984)

- Born: 18 November 1984 (age 41); Warsaw, Poland
- Education: Warsaw University of Technology
- Occupations: Programmer, actor
- Years active: 1997–2007

Aleksander Ihnatowicz (Polish: [a.lɛkˈsan.dɛr ix.naˈtɔ.vit͡ʂ]; born 18 November 1984) is a Polish programmer, and a retired television, film, and theater actor. He starred as Roman Latosz in the Polsat comedy television series Foster Family (1999–2007), and Ronnie Nowak in the TVP1 comedy television series Tygrysy Europy (1999, 2003).

== Biography ==
Aleksander Ihnatowicz was born on 18 November 1984 in Warsaw, Poland. At the age of five, he began attending acting classes. Ihnatowicz made his film debut in the 1997 drama film Home Chronicles, with the role of Olo. The same year, he also acted in the television plays Dziady, Wiórek, and Król Maciuś I, having the leading role in the latter.

From 1999 to 2007, Ihnatowicz starred as Roman Latosz in the Polsat comedy television series Foster Family. In 1999 and 2003, he also played Ronnie Nowak, one of the main characters in the TVP1 comedy television series Tygrysy Europy. Ihnatowicz also appeared in the series Trzy szalone zera (1999), Adam i Ewa (2000), and Sąsiedzi (2005). In 2005, he was a guest in the TVN talk show Rozmowy w toku. Ihnatowicz ended his acting career in 2007.

Ihnatowicz graduated from the Warsaw University of Technology, and works professionally as a programmer.

== Filmography ==
=== Films ===
Year	Title	Role	Notes	Ref.
1997	Home Chronicles	Olo	Featuere film	
1997	Dziady	Józio	Television play	
1997	Król Maciuś I	King Matt I	Television play	
1997	Wiórek	Kuba	Television play	
1998	Cesarski szaleniec	Jurik	Television play	
1998	Naparstek Pana Boga	Janek	Television play	

=== Television series ===
Year	Title	Role	Notes	Ref.
1999	Trzy szalone zera	Friend of Ola, Olaf, and Oskar	6 episodes	
1999, 2003	Tygrysy Europy	Ronnie Nowak	Main role	
1999–2007	Foster Family	Romek Latosz	Main role	
2000	Adam i Ewa	Young Bogdan Werner		
2005	Sąsiedzi	Krzysio Wieczorek	Episode: "Ich czworo"	
2005	Rozmowy w toku	Himself (guest)	Talk show; 1 episode	
