= Tomasz Dedek =

Polish actor (born 1957)

Tomasz Michał Dedek
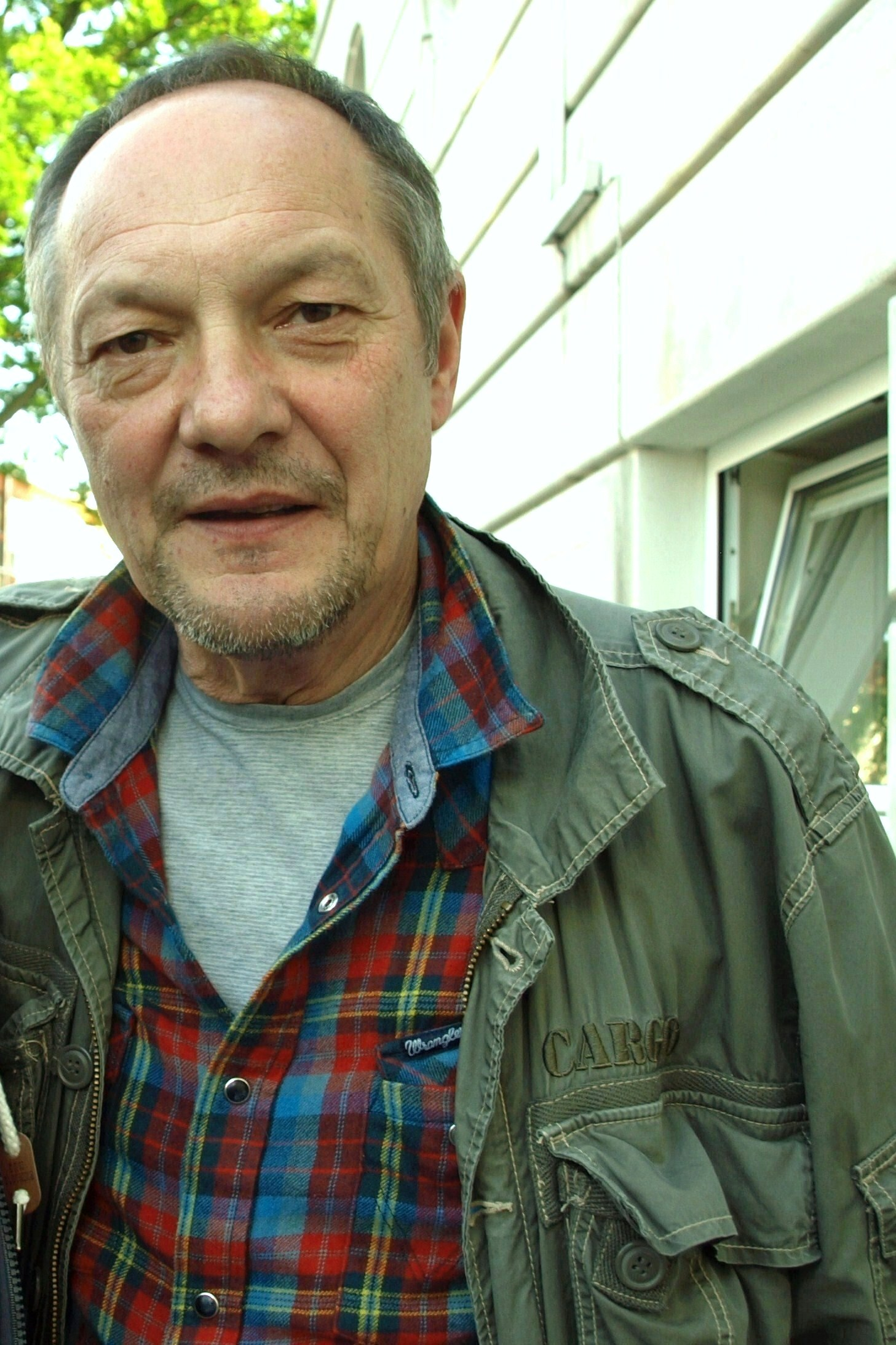
- Born: 20 September 1957 (age 68); Rawa Mazowiecka, Poland
- Occupation: Actor
- Years active: 1979 – present
- Spouse: Magdalena Soszyńska-Dedek

Tomasz Michał Dedek (born 20 September 1957 in Rawa Mazowiecka) is a Polish theatre, film, and voice actor.

== Biography ==
In 1979 he starred in the film Godzina "W" and gained great notoriety by playing the role of a shooter named "Eagle" (pol. Orzeł). In 1981 he graduated from the Acting Department of the Aleksander Zelwerowicz National Academy of Dramatic Art in Warsaw. In the same year he became an actor in the Ateneum Theatre in Warsaw. He also became well known for playing Jędrula Kossoń, Alutka's husband, in Rodzina zastępcza. Dedek currently stars on screen in films and TV series.

On 4 November 2007 Dedek publicly announced his admission to being a secret collaborator of the Służba Bezpieczeństwa (SB, a communist secret service during the time of the Polish People's Republic) with the nickname "Papkin". Between 1977 and 1979, he reported on (among others) Jerzy Gudejko, Maciej Rayzacher, Krzysztof Kolberger and Piotr Grabowski. He also admitted to accepting money from the SB in exchange for information. His collaboration with the SB formally ended in 1979.

== Filmography ==
- 1982: Przesłuchanie - UB officer "Czesiek" arresting Tonia
- 1984: Thais - Cheron
- 1984: Piotr - Herbert Bielas
- 1985: Miłość z listy przebojów - Piotr
- 1989: Labirynt - Waiter in the Empty Restaurant
- 1992: Czarne Słońca - Wilk
- 1992: Pigs - Wawro
- 1993: Schindler's List - Gestapo #1
- 1994: Dogs 2: The last blood - Wawro
- 1995: Les Milles - L'homme au Couteau
- 1995: Pułkownik Kwiatkowski - Sentry commander
- 1997: Nocne graffiti - Maly
- 1997: Wezwanie - Militiaman
- 1997: Sztos
- 1998: Taekwondo - Sports Club Chairman
- 1998: Amok
- 1999: Fuks - The Woman
- 1999: Pan Tadeusz - Judge's Housemate
- 2000: Enduro Bojz
- 2001: Pieniądze to nie wszystko - Dziobaty
- 2001: Poranek kojota - Maly
- 2002: Where Eskimos Live
- 2002: Haker - Adam's father
- 2003: Pogoda na jutro - Policjant
- 2005: Siedem grzechów popcooltury - Mojzesz
- 2009: Generał Nil - General Stanislaw Tatar
- 2010: Mala matura 1947 - Professor Podkowinski
- 2013: Bilet na ksiezyc
- 2016: Historia Roja - Jan Wodzynski
- 2024: Putin - Boris Yeltsin
