= Yob, or The Last Brain Cell =

- Directed by: Konrad Niewolski
- Written by: Konrad Niewolski
- Produced by: Mariusz Łukomski
- Starring: Tomasz Borkowski; Andrzej Andrzejewski; Borys Szyc; Agnieszka Włodarczyk
- Cinematography: Mikołaj Łebkowski
- Edited by: Jarosław Pietraszek
- Music by: Sebastian Skalski; Rafał Hoffman
- Distributed by: Monolith Video
- Release date: November 3, 2006
- Running time: 92 minutes
- Country: Poland
- Language: Polish
- Budget: 2,900,000 zlotys ($1,017,000/€755,000/£668,000)

Yob, or The Last Brain Cell (Polish: Job, czyli ostatnia szara komórka) is a 2006 Polish comedy film directed by Konrad Niewolski.

The film is a set of many popular jokes, and also a story of three friends – Adi, Pele and Chemik, who experience many adventures.

== Cast ==
- Tomasz Borkowski – Adi
- Andrzej Andrzejewski – Pele
- Borys Szyc – Chemik
- Agnieszka Włodarczyk – Karolina
- Elżbieta Jarosik – Gorzyńska
- Aleksander Mikołajczak – Film critic
- Maria Klejdysz – Grandmother of Pele
- Henryk Gołębiewski – Uncle Edi
- Arkadiusz Detmer – Łukasz from "Symetria"
- Jerzy Schejbal – Ambassador of Hungary
- Piotr Zelt – Football fan at the doctor's
- Krzysztof Ibisz – Host of the game show
- Janusz Onufrowicz – Rastafari man
- Sławomir Sulej – Man from ORMO
- Rafał Cieszyński – Fitness instructor
- Paweł Nowisz – Driving instructor
