= Maria Gładkowska =

Polish actress (born 1957)

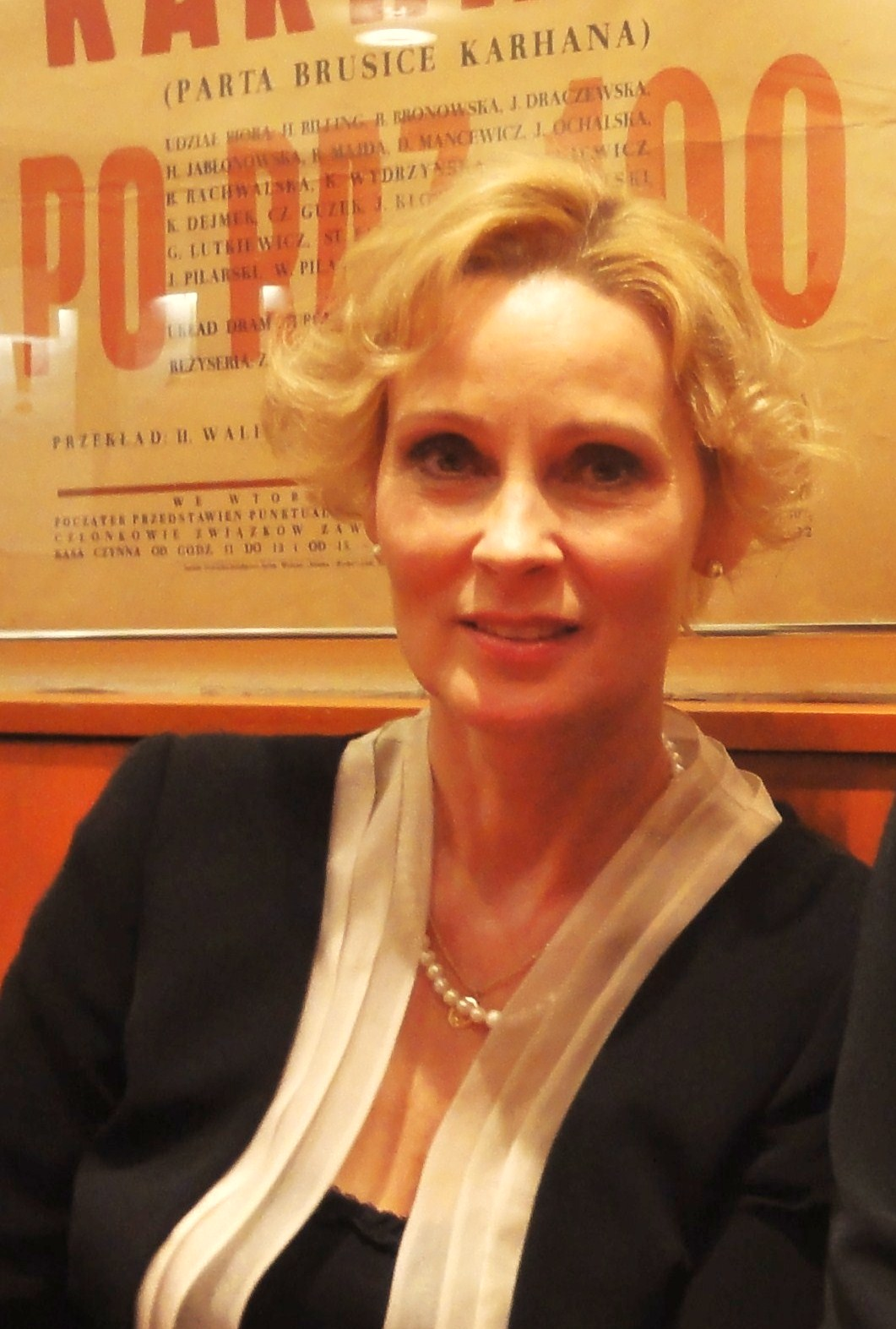
- Gładkowska in 2011
- Born: 16 September 1957 (age 69); Zielona Góra, Poland
- Other name: Maria Gładkowska-Moszuk
- Education: National Academy of Dramatic Art in Warsaw (MFA)
- Occupation: Actress
- Years active: 1977–present
- Notable work: Daisy in Magnat (1987); Ania in Dekalog: One (1988)
- Spouse: Sławomir Idziak (1999–2006)
- Awards: Zbyszek Cybulski Award (1988)

Maria Gładkowska (born 16 September 1957) is a Polish film, stage, and television actress. She gained critical acclaim in the 1980s that culminated in her Zbigniew Cybulski Award (1988). Gładkowska portrayed Daisy, Princess of Pless, her breakthrough performance in Magnat (1987), which was included in the list of 100 Best Polish Films of all time.

== Career ==
=== Early life and education ===
Gładkowska started her film career in 1977 at the age of 20. In her senior year of high school, she won a national contest for a theatre review and appeared in Janusz Morgenstern's historical series Polish Roads (Polish: Polskie drogi). Later she attended the Aleksander Zelwerowicz National Academy of Dramatic Art's Faculty of Acting, where she studied between 1978 and 1982. Her first professional stage appearance was as Elwira in a production of Husband and wife (Polish: Mąż i żona) by Aleksander Fredro (1983).

=== Theatre ===
She was a guest troupe member of the Adequate Theatre (Polish: Teatr Adekwatny) in Warsaw, "Scena Prezentacje" Theatre in Warsaw, and a permanent troupe member of the Siren Theatre (Polish: Teatr Syrena) in Warsaw and the New Theatre in Łódź (Polish: Teatr Nowy).

Her most notable stage appearances are as Mother in The Laments (2001), as Mary Tyron in Long Day's Journey into Night (2006), as Susie Cameron in The Spirit Level (2011) opposite Andrzej Szczytko, as Alice in Sexy Laundry (2018) opposite Wojciech Wysocki, and as Anne Hathaway in Shakespeare's Will (2019).

Since 2017 Gładkowska performs at the New Theatre, Łódź and Izrael Poznański Palace, narrating the Łódź's edition of Anna Dymna's Cracow Poetry Salon (Polish: Krakowski Salon Poezji).

=== Film and television ===
Gładkowska had great success in films such as Dekalog: One (1988, dir. Krzysztof Kieślowski), The Hostage of Europe (1989, dir. Jerzy Kawalerowicz), Faustina (1995, dir. Jerzy Łukaszewicz) opposite Dorota Sega, Argument About Basia (1995) opposite Piotr Fronczewski, Historia kina w Popielawach (1998, dir. Jan Jakub Kolski), Chopin: Desire for Love (2002, dir. Jerzy Antczak) and King Arthur (2004, dir. Antoine Fuqua). She reclaimed her stardom in the late 1990s and early 2000s with supporting roles in soap opera Mothers, Wives and Lovers (Polish: Matki, żony i kochanki) and medical drama For better and for worse (Polish: Na dobre i na złe).

Gładkowska was the Polish voice of Shmi Skywalker in Star Wars: Episode I – The Phantom Menace (1999) and Star Wars: Episode II – Attack of the Clones (2002).

Additionally, Gładkowska has appeared in many Television Theatre (Polish: Teatr Telewizji) plays including Irydion (1982, dir. Jan Englert) as Elsionoe, The Misanthrope (1984, dir. Janusz Majewski) as Éliante, The Mousetrap (1996, dir. Janusz Majewski) as Jennifer Brice and Pygmalion (1998, dir. Maciej Wojtyszko) as an Ambassador's wife.

=== Personal life ===
Gładkowska has been married three times, with each marriage ending in divorce. Later, Gładkowska began a relationship with a cinematographer and an Academy Award nominee Slawomir Idziak. She has three children, including Adam Wróblewski, known for his role in the Janusz Majewski's autobiographical film Mała matura 1947 (2010).

== Filmography ==
=== Films ===
- 1982: Sęp (Dögkeselyű) as Cecília Roska
- 1982: Wyjście awaryjne as Dorota Kolędowa
- 1985: C.K. Dezerterzy as Polish Red Cross sister
- 1986: Magnat as Daisy von Teuss
- 1987: Cesarskie cięcie as Gabrysia, Marek's girl
- 1988: Dekalog: One as Ania, Krzysztof's friend
- 1989: Vadon as Amadea Zsablyai
- 1989: Bal na dworcu w Koluszkach as ambassadress
- 1989: Wagarowicze (Iskolakerulok) as Edit
- 1989: Jeniec Europy as Madame Albine de Montholon
- 1990: W środku Europy as Boguś's mother
- 1991: Panny i wdowy as Ewelina
- 1991: Tak tak as Krystyna
- 1993: Dwa księżyce as Krystyna
- 1994: Miasto prywatne as Gocha
- 1994: Faustina as doctor
- 1995: Barwy świętości as lector
- 1995: Argument About Basia as Stanisława Olszańska
- 1996: Słodko gorzki as Mat's mother
- 1998: Historia kina w Popielawach as heiress
- 2002: Chopin: Desire for Love as princess Joanna, Konstanty's wife
- 2004: King Arthur as Arthur's mother
- 2005: Parę osób, mały czas as Marysia
- 2007: Testosteron as Tytus's mother
- 2009: Nigdy nie mów nigdy as animal home manager
- 2009: Miasto z morza as Olga
- 2010: Huśtawka as Anna's mother
- 2010: Milczenie jest złotem as boss
- 2011: Być jak Kazimierz Deyna as mother-in-law
- 2012: Vocuus as judge
- 2012: Nad życie as Agata's Mróz mother
- 2013: Śliwowica as Jagna Miedzianowska
- 2016: Smoleńsk as victim's family member
- 2017: Listy do M. 3 as Zuza's mother
- 2019: Homesick as Maria
- 2019: D-moll as Gosia's boss
- 2023: Klecha as sister Lukrecja

=== TV series ===
- 1977: Polskie drogi as resistance group member
- 1986: Biała wizytówka as Daisy, Hans Heinrich wife
- 1989: Kanclerz as princess Radziwiłł
- 1991: Pogranicze w ogniu as Renata von Nietzmer, secretary
- 1991: Panny i wdowy as Ewelina, Karolina's daughter
- 1995, 1998: Matki, żony i kochanki as Maria, Lipert's wife
- 1996: Awantura o Basię as Stanisława Olszańska
- 1997: Sława i chwała as princess Maria Bilińska, Myszyński's sister
- 1999–2000: Czułość i kłamstwa as Ewa Miśkiewicz
- 2002–2010: Samo Życie as lawyer
- 2002: Lokatorzy as Agata Strakacz
- 2005: Tak miało być as Elżbieta Zawilska, sanatorium director
- 2005: Pensjonat pod Różą as Gabi
- 2005–2008, 2010, from 2012: Na dobre i na złe as Maria Starska, Lena's mother
- 2005: Biuro kryminalne as Małgorzata Matuszek
- 2006–2012: Pierwsza miłość as Jagna Miedzianowska, Bartek's mother
- 2006: Niania as Wolska
- 2006: Mrok as Kasia Orska
- 2006: U fryzjera as client
- 2007: Glina as Bożena Pawłowska, Kamil's Król mother
- 2007: Mamuśki as Ela Malasińska, Jowitka's mother
- 2008: Daleko od noszy as magazine editor "Przyszłość bez tajemnic"
- 2009: Barwy szczęścia as Ada's mother
- 2009: Miasto z morza as Olga Wieniatycka
- 2009: Sprawiedliwi as Jadwiga Kaniewska, professor's wife
- 2011: Usta usta as USC clerk
- 2011: Ojciec Mateusz as doctor Barbara Woźniak, Radek's mother
- 2011: Rezydencja as Izabela Gruber, Kornelia's mother
- 2011: Unia serc as museum director
- 2012: Julia as Agata Miechowska
- 2012: True Law as judge Klimecka
- 2014–2016: Klan as Wanda, new chosen confectioner Wiesław Orzeszko
- 2015: Uwikłani as Bożena Bednarek
- 2019: Zasada przyjemności as Jadwiga Zarychta
- 2020–2023: Archiwista as Iza Konopka
- 2021: Na sygnale as Helena Krynicka-Rosa
- 2023: Leśniczówka as Weronika
- 2023: Korona królów as countess Anne of Teck

=== Polish dubbing ===
- 1999: Star Wars: Episode I – The Phantom Menace as Shmi Skywalker
- 2002: Star Wars: Episode II – Attack of the Clones as Shmi Skywalker and Dormé

== Sources ==
- Maria Gładkowska in filmpolski.pl database
- Maria Gładkowska in filmweb.pl database
- Maria Gładkowska in e-teatr.pl database
