= Magnate =

Person (usually a man) in a position of high wealth, power, or nobility

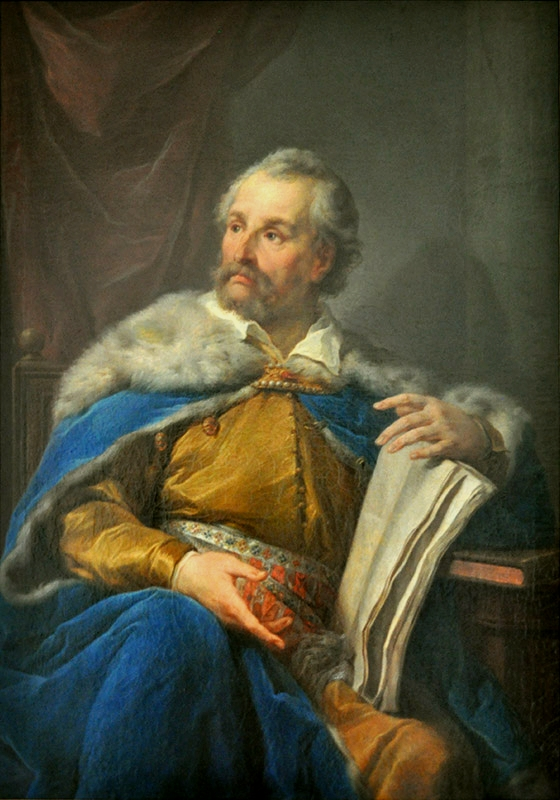
Jan Zamoyski, an important 16th-century Polish magnate

A magnate was a man from the higher nobility, a man who belonged to the high office-holders, or a man in a high social position, by birth, wealth or other qualities in Western Christian countries since the medieval period. It also includes the members of the higher clergy, such as bishops, archbishops and cardinals. In reference to the medieval, the term is often used to distinguish higher territorial landowners and warlords, such as counts, earls, dukes, and territorial-princes from the baronage. In Poland the szlachta (nobles) constituted one of the largest proportions of the population (around 10–12%) and 'magnat' refers to the richest nobles, or nobles of the nobility – even though they had equal voting rights in Poland's electoral monarchy.

== England ==
In England, the magnate class went through a change in the later Middle Ages. It had previously consisted of all tenants-in-chief of the crown, a group of more than a hundred families. The emergence of Parliament led to the establishment of a parliamentary peerage that received personal summons, rarely more than sixty families. A similar class in the Gaelic world were the Flatha. In the Middle Ages, a bishop sometimes held territory as a magnate, collecting the revenue of the manors and the associated knights' fees.

== Poland and Lithuania ==
Magnates were a social class of wealthy and influential nobility in the Crown of the Kingdom of Poland and Grand Duchy of Lithuania, and later the Polish–Lithuanian Commonwealth.

== Similar terms elsewhere ==
Velikaš is the Serbo-Croatian word for 'magnate', derived from veliko ('great, large, grand'). It was used to refer to the highest nobility of Serbia in the Middle Ages and Croatia in the Middle Ages.

In Spain, since the late Middle Ages, the highest class of nobility hold the appellation of Grandee of Spain and was known earlier as ricohombres.

In Sweden, the wealthiest medieval lords were known as storman (plural stormän), "great men", a similar description and meaning as the English term magnate, see "Swedish nobility" for more.

== See also ==
- Aristocracy
- Boyar, in Eastern Europe
- Daimyo, powerful landlords in feudal Japan
- Magnat (film)
