= Roland Blanche =

French actor (1943–1999)

- Blanche on the set of the 1991 film Cherokee
- Born: December 31, 1943; Choisy-le-Roi, France
- Died: September 13, 1999 (aged 55); Thiais, France
- Occupation: Actor
- Years active: 1965–1999
- Awards: Molière Award for Best Supporting Actor (1994)

Roland Blanche (31 December 1943 – 13 September 1999) was a French actor.

== Biography ==
Born to a working-class family, Blanche discovered an early calling for acting and began performing at the age of 12 at the children's theater in the city of Thiais. He went on to train at the Cours Simon, but faced a setback when his teachers discouraged him from applying to the Conservatoire National Supérieur d'Art Dramatique. For family reasons, he then set aside his acting career and, from the age of 19 to 29, worked as a sacristan at a Protestant church in Boulogne-Billancourt. A meeting with theatre director Roger Mollien allowed him to return to acting. He subsequently began a long-standing collaboration with director and playwright Jean-Michel Ribes.

From 1972, he worked in film regularly. He eventually became a familiar character actor in French cinema, where he typically portrayed unpleasant or villainous characters. His notable films included Danton, Les Compères (both 1983), Les Fugitifs (1986) and La Femme Nikita (1990). His performance in Too Beautiful for You (1989) earned him a nomination for the César Award for Best Supporting Actor. He had a rare starring role in the 1989 film The Hostage of Europe, where he played the imprisoned Napoleon Bonaparte. Another major role was that of the abusive, deranged father in Albert Dupontel's black comedy Bernie (1996). Besides his film work, Blanche regularly appeared on stage. In 1994, he won the Molière Award for Best Supporting Actor for his performance as Roma in The Resistible Rise of Arturo Ui, directed by Jérôme Savary at the Théâtre national de Chaillot.

Blanche unexpectedly died in his sleep in September 1999, as he was preparing to resume performances of the play Tedy.

== Filmography ==
| Year | Title | Role | Notes |
|---|---|---|---|
| 1965 | Cent briques et des tuiles | Curly | |
| 1972 | The Assassination | | |
| 1973 | R.A.S. | Sergent Lebel | |
| 1974 | Vous intéressez-vous à la chose ? | Alexandre | |
| 1975 | French Connection II | Arrested Man | Uncredited |
| 1976 | La Première Fois | Robert | |
| 1977 | Le Juge Fayard dit Le Shériff | Paul 'Paulo' Lecourtois | |
| 1977 | La question | Derida | |
| 1977 | Lâche-moi les valseuses!... | Roland | |
| 1977 | The Simple Past | The Renter | |
| 1977 | Aurais dû faire gaffe... le choc est terrible | Bijou | |
| 1978 | Le Dernier Amant romantique | Bianco, le clown blanc | |
| 1978 | 92 minutter af i går | Franskmanden | |
| 1979 | Mais ou et donc Ornicar | Pablo | |
| 1979 | Ils sont grands, ces petits | L'égoutier | |
| 1979 | Collections privées | Benoît | (segment "L'île aux sirènes") |
| 1979 | Le mors aux dents | Aristote Vassiliadès, dit 'Le Grec' | |
| 1979 | Le pull-over rouge | L'inspecteur Couderc | |
| 1979 | Démons de midi | | |
| 1979 | Rien ne va plus | Le paysan / André Rativier / Le garçon de café / L'homme sur la quai du métro | |
| 1979 | I as in Icarus | Garcia Santos | |
| 1980 | The Woman Cop | L'inspecteur Roc | |
| 1980 | La Bande du Rex | Kanter | |
| 1981 | Du blues dans la tête | Le garagiste | |
| 1981 | Julien Fontanes, magistrat | Beno | TV series; episode "La dernière haie" |
| 1981 | Choice of Arms | Fernand | |
| 1981 | Birgitt Haas Must Be Killed | Othenin | |
| 1982 | Tir groupé | Michel Poubennec | |
| 1982 | Transit | | |
| 1983 | Danton | Lacroix | |
| 1983 | Équateur | One-eyed man | |
| 1983 | En cas de guerre mondiale, je file à l'étranger | Writer 1 | |
| 1983 | Les Compères | Jeannot | |
| 1984 | La triche | Manuel Garcia | |
| 1984 | La femme ivoire | Doctor | |
| 1985 | Ça n'arrive qu'à moi | Le facteur | |
| 1985 | Sincerely Charlotte | Le représentant en farces et attrapes | |
| 1985 | Le pactole | Bandin | |
| 1985 | Visage de chien | Jules | |
| 1985 | Diesel | Zilber | |
| 1985 | Le 4ème pouvoir | Andre Villechaise | |
| 1986 | La galette du roi | Le pilote de l'avion | |
| 1986 | Paulette, la pauvre petite milliardaire | Albert-Henri | |
| 1986 | Yiddish Connection | Franco | |
| 1986 | Twist again à Moscou | Sergueï Lentiev | |
| 1986 | Les Fugitifs | Idriss | |
| 1987 | The Miracle | Plombie | |
| 1988 | Saxo | Raphaël Scorpio | |
| 1988 | Les Saisons du plaisir | Gus Sirocco | |
| 1988 | La comédie du travail | Benoît Constant | |
| 1988 | Une nuit à l'Assemblée Nationale | Marius Agnello | |
| 1989 | La soule | Gauberlin | |
| 1989 | Too Beautiful for You | Marcello | |
| 1989 | The Hostage of Europe | Napoleon Bonaparte | |
| 1990 | La Femme Nikita | Police interrogator | |
| 1991 | Cold Moon | L'accoudé | |
| 1991 | Une époque formidable... | Copi | |
| 1991 | Cherokee | Bock | |
| 1991 | Le cri des hommes | | |
| 1992 | Loulou Graffiti | Le curé | |
| 1993 | Hélas pour moi | Art teacher/bookkeeper | |
| 1993 | Justinien Trouvé, ou le bâtard de Dieu | Galine | |
| 1993 | Chacun pour toi | Roland | |
| 1994 | Bonsoir | De Tournefort | |
| 1994 | Elles ne pensent qu'à ça... | Mario | |
| 1996 | Beaumarchais | Charles Thévenot De Morande | Uncredited |
| 1996 | Unpredictable Nature of the River | Monsieur Denis | |
| 1996 | Le Jaguar | Moulin | |
| 1996 | Bernie | Donald Willis | |
| 1996 | Hercule et Sherlock | Antoine Morand | |
| 1998 | Robin des mers | Hubert Baudry | |
| 2000 | Salsa | Henry | Final film role; released posthumously |
