= The Hostage of Europe =

- Directed by: Jerzy Kawalerowicz
- Written by: Jerzy Kawalerowicz
- Based on: Jeniec Europy by Juliusz Dankowski
- Produced by: Alain Mayor
- Starring: Roland Blanche; Vernon Dobtcheff
- Cinematography: Wieslaw Zdort
- Edited by: Józef Bartczak
- Music by: Maciej Malecki
- Production company: Cine-Allianz
- Distributed by: Cine-Allianz
- Release date: September 29, 1989
- Running time: 124 min
- Countries: Poland; France
- Languages: Polish; French

Jeniec Europy is a Polish historical film based on the novel by Juliusz Dankowski. It was released in 1989.

== Plot ==
Year 1815. Napoleon I, after the defeat at Waterloo, is exiled to the Isle of St. Helena. He is accompanied by servants and the most faithful friends. They are assigned the Longwood Estate. A new governor, Hudson Lowe, appears on the island with allied representatives: Count Balmain from Russia, Baron von Sturmer from Austria and the Marquis of Montchenu from France. There are skirmishes between the governor and the prisoner.

== Cast ==
- Roland Blanche as Napoleon Bonaparte
- Vernon Dobtcheff as Hudson Lowe
- François Berléand as General Montholon
- Didier Flamand as General Bertrand
- Ronald Guttman as General Gougaud
- Jean-Jacques Moreau as Marchand
- Catriona MacColl as Lady Lowe
- Maria Gładkowska as Madame Montholon
- Isabelle Petit-Jacques as Madame Bertrand
- Georges Claisse as Thomas Reade
- Jay Benedict as Captain Henry Fox
- Jean-François Delacour as Las Cases
- Daniel Langlet as Marquise de Montchenu
- Piotr Krukowski as Sturmer
- Czeslaw Wojtala as Duke Balmain
- Marek Sikora as Santini
- Arkadiusz Bazak as Admiral Cockburn
