= Katarzyna Dąbrowska =

Polish actress and singer (born 1984)

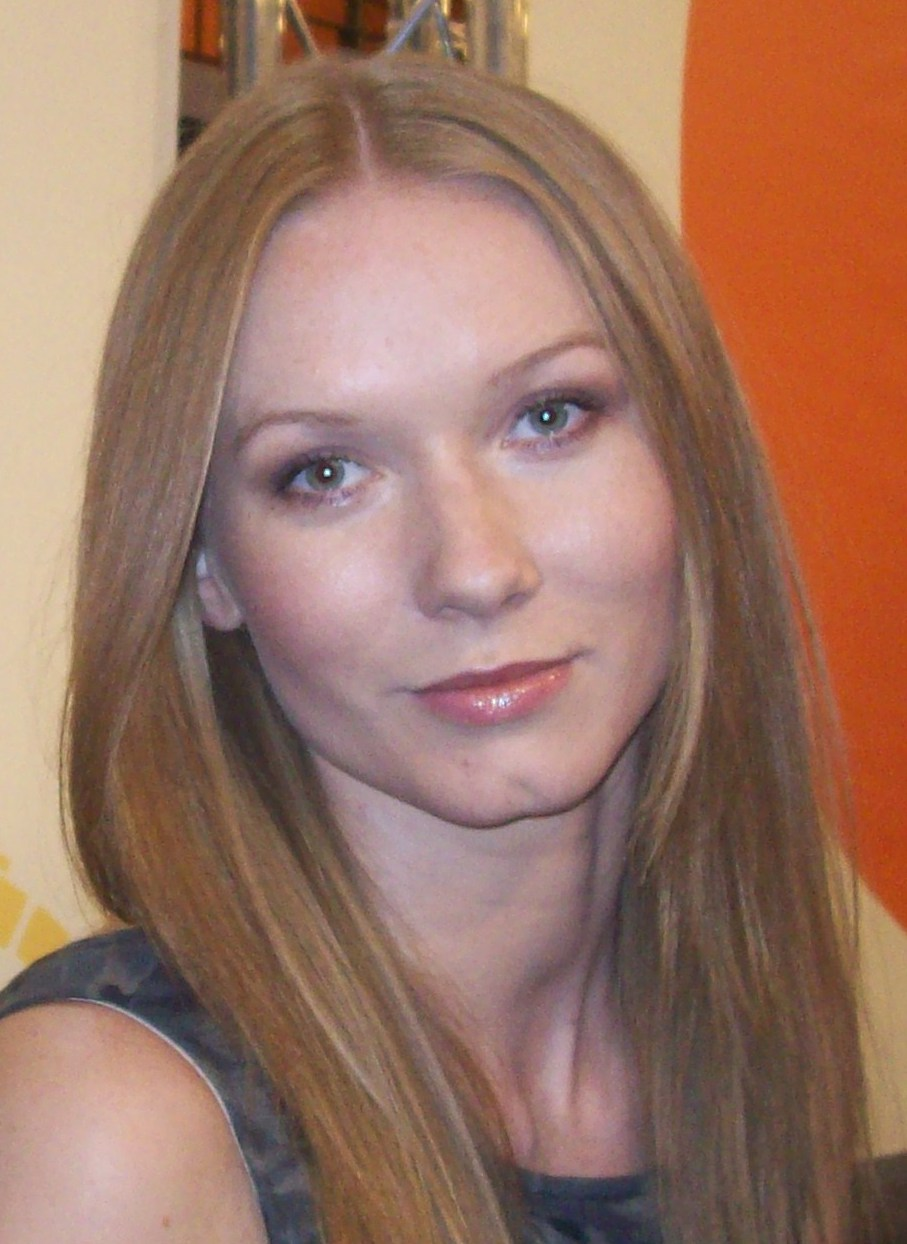
- Dąbrowska in 2012
- Born: Katarzyna Dąbrowska; 14 March 1984 (age 42); Nowe Miasto Lubawskie, Poland
- Occupations: Actress; singer

Katarzyna Dąbrowska (born 14 March 1984) is a Polish actress and singer. She graduated from the Aleksander Zelwerowicz State Theatre Academy.

She won Countrywide French Song Contest. She scored 3rd place in XXVIII Actors Song Review in Wrocław (2007), first place in Student Song Festival in Kraków (2007). She also got II Award of Minister of Culture and National Heritage for her role as Kate in the production "Tańce w Ballybeg" on XXV Festival of Theatre Schools.

Nowadays she is an actress in Teatr Współczesny in Warsaw.

== Filmography ==
- 1997: Klan as bank worker
- 2005: Egzamin z życia as Zeta's friend
- 2006: M jak miłość as Lidka
- 2006: Mrok as Krycha
- 2007: Kryminalni as Paulina Wysocka
- 2008: Londyńczycy as waitress
- 2008–present: Na dobre i na złe as Wiktoria Manuela Consalida
- 2009: Teraz albo nigdy! as Inka
- 2009-2010: Czas honoru as Graba, guard in jail
- 2009: Zuzanna as Anna
- 2011: Czarny czwartek (voice)
- 2011: Urodziny
- 2016: The Innocents as nun Anna
- 2022: The Behaviorist as Brygida Edling
