= Laura Pajor =

Polish actress (born 1997)

- Born: 1997 (age 28–29); Limanowa, Poland
- Education: AST National Academy of Theatre Arts in Kraków
- Occupation: Actress
- Years active: 2021–present
- Height: 163 cm (5 ft 4 in)

Laura Pajor is a Polish film, television and stage actress. She is known for her performances in the Netflix productions Mother’s Day (Dzień Matki, 2023) and 1670 (2023–2025), as well as for the recurring role of Rita Malicka in the long-running TV series Na dobre i na złe.

== Early life and education ==
Laura Pajor was born in Limanowa, Poland, and grew up in Czchów. She attended the renowned Bartłomiej Nowodworski High School in Kraków before enrolling at the Wrocław branch of AST National Academy of Theatre Arts in Kraków, where she graduated from the Acting Department in 2025. During her studies, she appeared in several stage productions, including Uroczystość / Festen (The Celebration) by Mogens Rukov and Thomas Vinterberg, directed by Krzysztof Dracz, and Moje serce, mój lód (My Heart, My Ice) by Paweł Wolak and Katarzyna Dworak, portraying the roles of the Mother, the Teacher, and the Mother's Heart.

== Career ==
=== Theatre ===
After graduating, Pajor joined the National Theatre in Warsaw as a guest actress, appearing in Inne rozkosze (Other Pleasures) by Jerzy Pilch, directed by Jacek Głomb, playing Elżunia and a member of the Women's Choir. In 2025, she joined the ensemble of the Jan Kochanowski Powszechny Theatre in Radom, debuting on 8 March in the play Tchnienie (Breath) directed by Krzysztof Dracz.

=== Film and television ===
Pajor made her film debut in the 2022 short film Dzień dobry (Good Morning), directed by Klara Bardian, which won several awards at Polish and international festivals. She later appeared in the Netflix action film Mother’s Day (Dzień Matki, 2023) as Ganguska and in the historical comedy series 1670 (2023–2025) as Teresa. She also portrayed Rita Malicka in the popular medical drama Na dobre i na złe and appeared in an episode of Dzielnica strachu (District of Fear) as Lidka Rybczyńska.

== Awards and recognition ==
- 2024 – Special mention, Festival of Theatre Schools in Łódź, for Moje serce, mój lód
- 2023 – Grand Prix, XX UFF(o)A Festival (Poland), for Dzień dobry
- 2023 – Grand Prix, 21st Opolskie Lamy Film Festival (Poland), for Dzień dobry
- 2023 – Grand Prix, Short Film Competition (Poland), for Dzień dobry
- 2023 – Grand Prix (Georgia), for Uroczystość / Festen
