= Hélas pour moi =

- Theatrical release poster
- Directed by: Jean-Luc Godard
- Written by: Jean-Luc Godard
- Produced by: Alain Sarde
- Starring: Gérard Depardieu
- Cinematography: Caroline Champetier
- Edited by: Jean-Luc Godard
- Distributed by: Pan-Européenne Distribution
- Release date: 8 September 1993
- Running time: 84 minutes
- Countries: France; Switzerland
- Language: French

Hélas pour moi (English: Alas for Me or Oh Woe Is Me) is a 1993 French-Swiss experimental film directed by Jean-Luc Godard and starring Gérard Depardieu. The film is loosely inspired by the legend of Alcmene and Amphitryon, and depicts a deity attempting to experience the truth of human desire, suffering and pleasure.

== Plot ==
A man named Abraham Klimt arrives in a small Swiss village to investigate an incident that occurred on July 23, 1989 involving Rachel and Simon Donnadieu, a local couple. He interviews several of the townsfolk and enlists the aid of a poet, Aude Amiel. The story of Rachel and Simon unfolds in a series of flashbacks. Per the Greek myth on which the film is based, God—or a god—comes to Earth with his assistant, Max Mercury. He decides he wants to possess Rachel Donnadieu, so he takes the form of Simon Donnadieu when the latter leaves home on a business trip. God-as-Simon returns to Rachel while Simon is away, and the two have an encounter.

Or not. Rachel is not talking about the incident, and Simon, in a brief encounter with Klimt at the end of the film, denies that it happened. The evidence provided by the flashbacks is contradictory. Ultimately, Klimt concludes, "There is nothing left to say concerning Simon and Rachel. The rest occurs beyond images and beyond stories."

== Cast ==
- Gérard Depardieu as Simon Donnadieu/God
- Laurence Masliah as Rachel Donnadieu
- Bernard Verley as Abraham Klimt
- Aude Amiot as Aude Amiel
- Roland Blanche as The art teacher
- Jean-Louis Loca as Max Mercury
- Louis-Do de Lencquesaing as Ludovic
- Fabienne Chaudat

== Production ==
Cinematographer Caroline Champetier said that the original script began with God riding a train through France and Switzerland, observing all the battles of humanity through the window. This sequence would have required expensive special effects; Godard visited a company that demonstrated for him the effects they had achieved for Jean-Pierre Jeunet's Delicatessen, but ultimately gave up on the idea.

Principal photography took place in Switzerland, with Radio Télévision Suisse providing part of the financing. The collaboration between Godard and Depardieu, who had never worked together, was heavily promoted in the French media. However, the pair's working relationship was poor. Godard found Depardieu unfocused and uninvolved with the film; he was equally dissatisfied with his crew and some of the other cast members. Actor Roland Blanche later said that Godard had lashed out at him during filming, saying: "You are so bad that I can't even call you by your name, I'll say 'it'. When I say 'it', you'll know that it's you." According to Blanche's account, this episode led an outraged Depardieu to threaten Godard with physical violence.

According to Godard, Depardieu left halfway through the planned six-week shoot, without completing his scenes. This left Godard with just enough material for a one-hour film. In order to complete the picture, Godard conceived additional scenes featuring investigator Abraham Klimt, that functioned as a framing story.

== Reception ==
Hélas pour moi premiered at the 50th Venice International Film Festival. Pierre Murat of Télérama reviewed the film positively, calling it a difficult but fascinating work from Godard.

The film performed poorly at the French box office, selling 80,128 admissions. Depardieu refused to promote it and mentioned it publicly only once, when he joked about making two "commercials", one for Barilla's pasta, the other being Godard's film.

== Home video ==
Hélas pour moi was published in 2005 by Cahiers du Cinéma, as part of a double DVD that also included Godard's First Name: Carmen. It was also released on streaming on Amazon Prime.
