= Na dobre i na złe =

Polish television medical drama series

- Genre: Medical drama
- Created by: Ilona Łepkowska; Agnieszka Krakowiak-Kondracka
- Starring: Katarzyna Dąbrowska; Adam Daukszewicz; Piotr Garlicki; Mateusz Damięcki; Bartosz Opania
- Country of origin: Poland
- Original language: Polish
- No. of seasons: 28
- No. of episodes: 1000

Production
- Executive producers: Tadeusz Lampka; Stanisław Szymański
- Running time: 50 minutes

Original release
- Network: TVP2 (1999-)
- Release: November 7, 1999

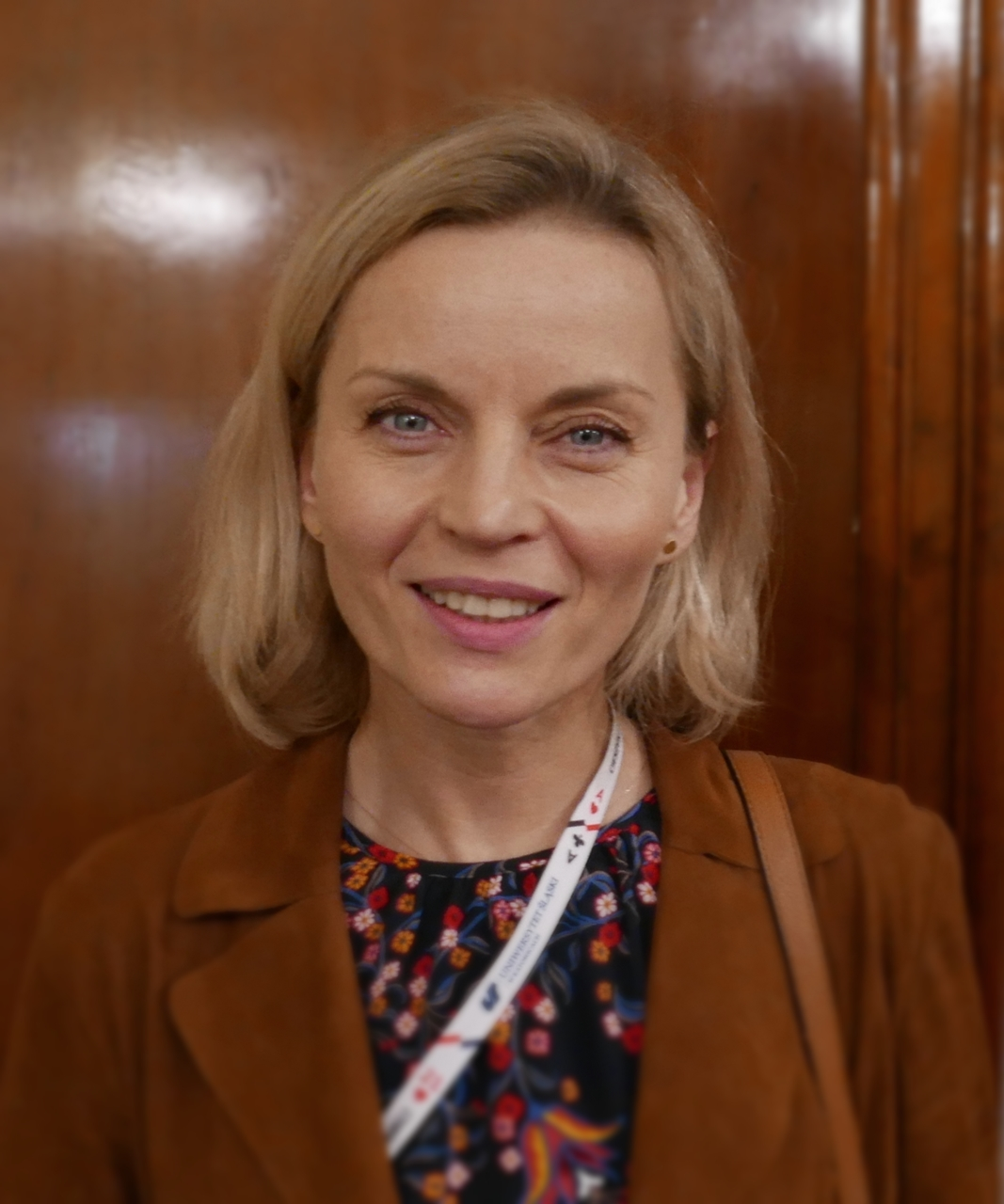
Małgorzata Foremniak, 2019

Na dobre i na złe (Polish pronunciation: [na ˈdɔbrɛ i na ˈzwɛ], For better and for worse) is a Polish television medical drama series, broadcast on TVP2 since 7 November 1999. It is the longest-running weekly primetime drama on Polish television and one of the longest-running medical dramas in the world. The show revolves around the lives of doctors and patients of a teaching hospital in a fictional town of Leśna Góra near Warsaw.

Na dobre i na złe won the "Telekamery" award for the best TV series in 2001, 2002 and 2003.

== Cast members ==
=== Current cast members ===
Current cast members as of March 2024.

Actor	Role	First episode
Renata Berger	Jadwiga Ziemiańska	January 2000
Piotr Garlicki	Stefan Tretter	June 2000
Joanna Pach-Żbikowska	Joanna Kalinowska	January 2002
Sławomir Wierzbicki	Sławomir	March 2007
Robert Koszucki	Rafał Konica	April 2007
Maria Góralczyk	Beata Nowakowska	October 2007
Emilia Komarnicka-Klynstra	Agata Woźnicka	November 2008
Marcin Sianko	Paweł Gracz	January 2011
Marcin Zacharzewski	Borys Jakubek	January 2011
Michał Żebrowski	Andrzej Falkowicz	January 2012
Anna Lucińska	Anna Styczeń	April 2012
Mateusz Damięcki	Krzysztof Radwan	April 2014
Pola Gonciarz	Blanka Consalida	November 2014
Amelia Czaja	Matylda Smuda	June 2015
Maryla Morydz	Dagmara	November 2015
Aleksandra Hamkało	Julia Bart	February 2016
Piotr Głowacki	Artur Bart	March 2016
Filip Bobek	Marcin Molenda	January 2018
Mateusz Janicki	Michał Wilczewski	March 2018
Paulina Gałązka	Dominika Kwietniewska	March 2019
Anna Samusionek	Lucyna Sikorka	March 2019
Marcin Urbanke	Tadeusz Borucki	October 2019
Tomasz Ciachorowski	Maksymilian Beger	February 2020
Matej Matejka	Vaclav Homolka	April 2020
Joanna Jarmołowicz	Halina	April 2020
Katarzyna Skrzynecka	Alina Fisher	September 2020
Aleksandra Grabowska	Gloria Krasucka	December 2020
Monika Kaleńska	Joanna Gawryło	October 2021
Antoni Sałaj	Tomasz Jacyno	November 2021
Laura Pajor	Rita Malicka	2022
Mikołaj Korcz	Mariusz Milewski	September 2022
Katarzyna Wuczko	Maja Skawina	January 2023
Paweł Małaszyński	Aleksander "Aleś" Zagajewski	2024

=== Former cast members ===
Former members as of November 2019.

Actor	Role	First episode	Last episode
Barbara Brylska	Barbara Burska	October 2000	November 2002
Ewa Skibińska	Elżbieta Walicka	November 1999	December 2002
Zofia Merle	Genowefa Burczyk	January 2000	May 2003
Paweł Wilczak	Marek Zbieć	June 2000	November 2003
Leon Niemczyk	Michał Kalita	November 1999	November 2003
Krzysztof Pieczyński	Bruno Walicki	November 1999	February 2004
Daria Trafankowska	Danuta Dębska-Tretter	November 1999	April 2004
Piotr Adamczyk	Jerzy Kozerski	October 2003	October 2004
Dorota Segda	Agata Kwiecińska-Depczyk	November 1999	June 2005
Karolina Borkowska	Agnieszka Walicka	November 1999	October 2005
Tomasz Kot	Henryk Weiss-Korzycki	November 2004	November 2007
Sara Müldner	Julia Burska	November 1999	December 2007
Maja Ostaszewska	Małgorzata Donovan	October 2003	May 2008
Emilia Krakowska	Gabriela Krukowska-Kalita	November 1999	March 2009
Agnieszka Dygant	Maria Weiss-Korzycka	January 2002	May 2009
Joanna Liszowska	Dorota Lewkiewicz-Czyż	March 2005	October 2009
Maciej Radel	Konstanty Matuszka	October 2007	April 2010
Jolanta Fraszyńska	Monika Zybert-Jędras	December 1999	October 2010
Bartosz Obuchowicz	Tomasz Burski	November 1999	November 2011
Andrzej Zieliński	Adam Pawica	January 2000	December 2011
Artur Żmijewski	Jakub Burski	November 1999	February 2012
Edyta Jungowska	Bożena Van Der Graaf	April 2000	February 2012
Małgorzata Foremniak	Zofia Stankiewicz-Burska	November 1999	November 2012
Paulina Chruściel	Ludmiła Papierniak	April 2011	October 2013
Dariusz Jakubowski	Dariusz Wójcik	December 1999	January 2015
Agnieszka Judycka	Nina Rudnicka	November 2010	May 2014
Radosław Krzyżowski	Michał Sambor	November 2004	March 2015
Kamilla Baar-Kochańska	Hana Goldberg	June 2011	June 2015
Julia Kamińska	Zuzanna Krakowiak	October 2013	October 2016
Marta Dąbrowska	Kinga Walczyk-Falkowicz	October 2011	February 2017
Katarzyna Bujakiewicz	Marta Kozioł	June 2000	October 2017
Bartosz Opania	Witold Latoszek	October 2001	January 2018
Anita Sokołowska	Milena Starska	May 2003	January 2018
Magdalena Schejbal	Sara Mandel	December 2016	February 2018
Anna Karczmarczyk	Aleksandra Pietrzak	March 2013	February 2018
Marek Bukowski	Piotr Gawryło	April 2010	March 2018
Grzegorz Daukszewicz	Adam Krajewski	January 2013	September 2018
Marcin Rogacewicz	Przemysław Zapała	November 2008	September 2018
Daniel Olbrychski	Cezary Król	September 2018	February 2019
Liliana Głąbczyńska-Komorowska	Wanda Falkowicz	April 2012	May 2019
Katarzyna Dąbrowska	Wiktoria Consalida	November 2008	October 2019
Tetiana Melkova	Olena Kosenko	2023	February 2024
Marta Żmuda Trzebiatowska	Hanna Sikorka	March 2018	March 2024
Mikołaj Roznerski	Miłosz	September 2022	March 2024

== Awards and nominations ==
Year	Recipient	Award	Result
2000	Artur Żmijewski as Jakub Burski	Telekamery Award for Best Actor	Nominated
2000	Na dobre i na złe	Niptel Award for Soap Opera	Won
2001	Na dobre i na złe	Telekamery Award for Best TV Series	Won
2001	Małgorzata Foremniak as Zofia Stankiewicz-Burska	Telekamery Award for Best Actress	Won
2001	Artur Żmijewski as Jakub Burski	Telekamery Award for Best Actor	Won
2002	Na dobre i na złe	Telekamery Award for Best TV Series	Won
2002	Małgorzata Foremniak as Zofia Stankiewicz-Burska	Telekamery Award for Best Actress	Won
2002	Krzysztof Pieczyński as Bruno Walicki	Telekamery Award for Best Actor	Nominated
2002	Artur Żmijewski as Jakub Burski	Telekamery Award for Best Actor	Won
2002	Paweł Wilczak as Marek Zbieć	Wiktory Award for The Most Popular TV Actor or Actress	Won
2003	Na dobre i na złe	Telekamery Award for Best TV Series	Won
2003	Małgorzata Foremniak as Zofia Stankiewicz-Burska	Telekamery Award for Best Actress	Won
2003	Artur Żmijewski as Jakub Burski	Telekamery Award for Best Actor	Won
2004	Na dobre i na złe	Gold Telekamera Award	Won
2004	Małgorzata Foremniak as Zofia Stankiewicz-Burska	Gold Telekamera Award	Won
2004	Artur Żmijewski as Jakub Burski	Gold Telekamera Award	Won
2004	Agnieszka Dygant as Mariola Muślinek-Korzycka	Telekamery Award for Best Actress	Nominated
2004	Andrzej Zieliński as Adam Pawica	Telekamery Award for Best Actor	Nominated
2004	Krzysztof Pieczyński as Bruno Walicki	TeleEkran Award for Favourite Male Character	Won
2005	Agnieszka Dygant as Mariola Muślinek-Korzycka	Telekamery Award for Best Actress	Nominated
2006	Agnieszka Dygant as Mariola Muślinek-Korzycka	Telekamery Award for Best Actress	Won
2006	Tomasz Kot as Henryk Weiss-Korzycki	Telekamery Award for Best Actor	Nominated
2007	Agnieszka Dygant as Mariola Muślinek-Korzycka	Telekamery Award for Best Actress	Nominated
2007	Tomasz Kot as Henryk Weiss-Korzycki	Telekamery Award for Best Actor	Nominated
2009	Artur Żmijewski as Jakub Burski	Wiktory Award for The Most Popular TV Actor or Actress	Won
2009	Agnieszka Dygant as Mariola Muślinek-Korzycka	Telekamery Award for Best Actress	Nominated
2011	Artur Żmijewski as Jakub Burski	Wiktory Award for The Most Popular Actor or Actress	Nominated
2012	Marek Bukowski as Piotr Gawryło	Telekamery Award for Best Actor	Nominated
2013	Marek Bukowski as Piotr Gawryło	Telekamery Award for Best Actor	Won
2014	Kamilla Baar as Hana Goldberg	Telekamery Award for Best Actress	Won
2014	Marek Bukowski as Piotr Gawryło	Telekamery Award for Best Actor	Won
2015	Michał Żebrowski as Andrzej Falkowicz	Telekamery Award for Best Actor	Won
2016	Michał Żebrowski as Andrzej Falkowicz	Telekamery Award for Best Actor	Won
2017	Anita Sokołowska as Milena Starska-Latoszek	Telekamery Award for Best Actress	Nominated
2017	Michał Żebrowski as Andrzej Falkowicz	Telekamery Award for Best Actor	Won
2018	Katarzyna Dąbrowska as Wiktoria Consalida	Telekamery Award for Best Actress	Nominated
2018	Michał Żebrowski as Andrzej Falkowicz	Gold Telekamera Award	Won
2020	Marta Żmuda Trzebiatowska as Hanna Sikorka	Telekamery Award for Best Actress	Nominated
2021	Filip Bobek as Marcin Molenda	Telekamery Award for Best Actor	Nominated
2023	Piotr Głowacki as Artur Bart	Telekamery Award for Best Actor	Nominated
2024	Mateusz Damięcki as Krzysztof Radwan	Telekamery Award for Best Actor	Nominated
2024	Anna Szymańczyk as Iga Kosiorowska	Telekamery Award for The Revelation of Tele Tydzień	Won

== Characters ==
=== Hospital staff ===
Position	Staff
Medical directors	Agata Woźnicka (2022–present); Maksymilian Beger (2021-2022); Rafał Konica (May 2019 – 2021); Andrzej Falkowicz (2018-May 2019); Ruud Van Der Graaf (September 2017–May 2019); Ksawery Stanisławski (September 2016–September 2017); Stefan Tretter (2002–2016); Bruno Walicki (2001-February 2002); Tadeusz Zybert (November 1999–February 2002)
Administrative directors	Elżbieta Żak (November 2008-September 2012); Małgorzata Donovan (November 2005–April 2008); Agata Kwiecińska-Depczyk (November 1999–October 2005)
Surgeons	Michał Wilczewski (March 2018–present); Rafał Malicki (March 2018–present); Tomasz Rzepecki (April 2014–April 2017); Jan Stanisławski (April 2014–September 2016); Adam Krajewski (January 2013–September 2018); Andrzej Falkowicz (January 2012–present); Nina Rudnicka (November 2010-May 2014); Piotr Gawryło (April 2010-March 2018); Wiktoria Consalida (November 2008–October 2019); Przemysław Zapała (November 2008–September 2018); Stefan Tretter (December 2000–present); Jacek Mejer (April 2000–June 2010); Tadeusz Zybert (November 1999 – March 2017); Jakub Burski (November 1999–February 2012); Bruno Walicki (November 1999–February 2004)
Neurosurgeons	Barbara Wilczewska (September 2018–present); Artur Bart (March 2016–present); Sylwia Mróz-Dębska (September 2015-February 2017); Borys Jakubek (January 2011 – present)
Orthopedists	Barbara Wilczewska (September 2018–present); Hanna Sikorka (March 2018–present); Krzysztof Jędras (May 2007-January 2012); Rafał Konica (April 2007–present)
Internists	Jakub Grabski (February 2019 – present); Zuzanna Krakowiak (October 2013-October 2016); Agata Woźnicka (November 2008–November 2017, December 2019 – present); Karolina Orlicka (June 2007-March 2011); Milena Starska (October 2004-January 2018); Witold Latoszek (October 2001-January 2018); Dariusz Depczyk (January 2001-January 2002); Monika Zybert-Jędras (December 1999–October 2010); Adam Pawica (November 1999–December 2011)
Gynaecologists	Waclav Homolka (2021–present); Sara Mandel (December 2016-February 2018); Krzysztof Radwan (April 2014–present); Aleksandra Pietrzak (March 2013–September 2018); Hana Goldberg (June 2011–June 2015); Marcin Maciejewski (February 2009-September 2011); Dariusz Wójcik (November 1999–January 2015)
Anaesthesiologists	Marcin Molenda (January 2018 – present); Julia Bart (February 2016–present); Iwona Kalicka (September 2009–June 2010); Alicja Siedlecka (November 2006–June 2007); Edyta Kuszyńska (February 2001-November 2010); Abdul Dialo (May 2000-February 2002); Renata Ziemiańska (January 2000–present); Zofia Stankiewicz-Burska (November 1999–November 2012)
Cardiac surgeons	Maksymilian Beger (February 2020 – present)
Cardiologists	Marek Rogalski (October 2012-March 2017)
Neurologists	Dorota Rogalska (January 2013-May 2015)
Patomorphologists	Kinga Walczyk-Falkowicz (October 2011-October 2017); Manfred Piątkowski (May 2009-October 2011); Zygmunt Niedziela (April 2009-December 2009)
Psychiatrics	Szymon Dryl (April 2012-November 2015)
Radiologists	Paweł Gracz (January 2011 – present); Dorota Lewkiewicz-Czyż (March 2005-October 2009)
Nurses	Dagmara (November 2015 – present); Szczepan Lipski (February 2015–present); Barbara Wasiak (September 2012 – January 2013); Izabela Rutka (September 2009-February 2015); Beata Nowakowska (October 2007 – present); Joanna Kalinowska (2001–present); Marta Kozioł (June 2000-June 2011, February 2016-October 2017); Magda (February 2003-September 2014); Bożysława Van Der Graaf (April 2000-February 2012); Danuta Dębska-Tretter (November 1999–April 2004); Magdalena Szymczak (November 1999–January 2001); Katarzyna Gostyńska (November 1999–March 2000)
Doctors	Tadeusz Borucki (October 2019 – present); Kazimiera Radlica (October 2019 – present)
Paramedics	Jan Antkowiak (September 2016 – present); Katarzyna Orłowska (May 2016 – present)

=== Current threads ===
- Julia Bart, born Nowak, adopted Burska (Sara Müldner, Aleksandra Hamkało) is an anaesthiologist who workes at Leśna Góra hospital since 2016. She is a daughter of Ryszard Grec and his then lover, Mrs. Nowak. She was born as a legal daughter of Mr. Nowak and later adopted by Jakub Burski and Zofia Stankiewicz-Burska. Julia is married t Artur Bart since 2019 and has one child, Tymon Bart (born 2016). Her parents died in a car accident in November 1999. She was suppoused to stay with her maternal aunt, Anna Wolniak, who had four children of her own. However, during her hospitalization she became close with Zofia Stankiewicz and was planned to be adopted by Zofia and her future husband, Mikołaj Mellado. In 2000 Zofia and Mikołaj split and it led to stopping the procedure of adoption. In 2001 Zofia married a surgeon, Jakub Burski, and they adopted Julia. Julia has two adopted siblings, Tomasz Burski and Amelia Burska. In 2007 she moved with her parents to Australia and studied medicine there. She came back to Poland in 2016, expecting her first child. In 2016 in Boston she gave birth to her son, Tymon Bart, and in 2019 married his father, Artur Bart, a famous neurosurgeon. In early 2016 Julia learnt that her biological father was not Mrs. Nowak, but Ryszard Grec, a musician, who was diagnosed with Alzheimer disease and who had a romance with her mother.
- Blanka Milewska, born Consalida (Pola Gonciarz) is a gynaecologist who works in Leśna Góra. She was born in 1999 as a daughter of Wiktoria Consalida and her former teacher, Wojciech Sarnecki. Her mother was 16 years old student when she gave birth to her, so Blanka was raised as Wiktoria's sister. Blanka fell ill in 2009 and came to Poland to have a liver transplant. The only possible donor was her biological father, whom she met in September 2009. She had a liver transplantation on October 9, 2009. Blanka learnt that she was Wiktoria's daughter rather than sister but decided to come back to Spain with her legal mother. For a short time she studied photography in United States. In September 2016 she was diagnosed with osteosarcoma. During her treatment she met Maciej Kozłowski (Adam Bobik). They got engaged in April 2018. In 2017 Blanka started her studies in medicine in Bydgoszcz. Since 2019 she has her practice of gynecology in Leśna Góra, with Krzysztof Radwan as her teacher. In October 2019 her mother Wiktoria quit her job in Leśna Góra and moved permanently to Spain with her new partner, Jose. On 31 January 2024 Blanka married Mariusz Milewski (Marcin Korcz) in a religious ceremony. Later Kamiński turned out to be a gangster. He became a crown witness and his name was changed to Alejandro Torres. In November 2024 Consalida fell pregnant. On 21 May 2025 in Leśna Góra she gave birth to her daughter, Nina.
- Mariusz Milewski, alias Alejandro Torres (Marcin Korcz) is a former husband of Blanka Consalida. He has one child, Nina Consalida (born 2025).
- Nina Consalida is a daughter of Mariusz Milewski and his wife, Blanka Consalida. She was born on 20 May 2025 in Leśna Góra. At the time of her birth her parents were no longer married, as her father was officially considered dead. In early pregnancy Blanka lied to Mariusz that she lost their child in a hope to raise her without him. However, Mariusz worked out that Nina was his daughter and kidnapped her from a hospital.
- Andrzej Falkowicz (Michał Żebrowski) is a famous surgeon and former director of Leśna Góra hospital. He is widowed from Katarzyna Smuda and was previously married to Wanda Falkowicz and Kinga Walczyk. Andrzej has one biological child, Edward Falkowicz, and one stepdaughter, Matylda Smuda. His brother, Adam Krajewski, died in September 2018. Andrzej and Adam were born under the surname Baran. Their parents died ina fire of their house and Andrzej saved Adam's life. Adam was then adopted by Anna Krajewska and her husband while Andrzej was raised in an orphanage. They met again in Leśna Góra and Andrzej revealed that they were brothers. In January 2019 Falkowicz married his longtime friend, Katarzyna Smuda (Ilona Ostrowska), a lawyer and they raise Katarzyna's daughter, Matylda Smuda (Amelia Czaja). In late 2018 it was revealed that Matylda's biological father is Michał Wilczewski, a surgeon from Leśna Góra with whom Katarzyna had a romance when he was sixteen. Katarzyna died hours after giving birth to their son, Edward Falkowicz, in an explosion at Leśna Góra hospital.
- Borys Jakubek (Marcin Zacharzewski) is a neurosurgeon who has worked in Leśna Góra for many years. In late 2018 he accidentally met his unknown twin brother, Jakub Grabski (Maciej Zacharzewski) who turned out to be an internist. Their mother is Barbara Wasiak (Ewa Serwa), a former nurse.
- Rafał Konica (Robert Koszucki) is an orthopaedist who works in Leśna Góra since April 2007. Konica was previously addicted from drugs and had a romance, and then relationship with Marta Kozioł, a nurse. They had three children: Jan, Małgorzata and Artur. Marta left a family a few years after the birth of their youngest child and moved to United States with her new lover. She came back in early 2016 when their daughter Małgorzata was injured in a car accident and eventually died. Rafał was at the time engaged to marry Klaudia Miller, a surgeon, but had a one-night stand with Marta. Klaudia learnt about his betrayal a few minutes before their wedding. She decided to left Leśna Góra and move to Bavaria, Germany. Rafał is now single and raises his children with the help of Marta and her mother, Irena Kozioł. He was hospital's director.
- Marcin Molenda (Filip Bobek) is an anaesthesiologist who has problems because of pretending a death of one of his patients. Molenda fell in love with Julia Burska and they had a one-night stand in February 2019 but a mafia is following him and threatening of killing Julia and her son Tymon. Previously he was addicted to drugs and engaged to Weronika, who miscarried their child. In March 2019 he met Dominika Kwiecińska (Magdalena Gałązka), a pilot. They had a one-night stand. Dominika was later diagnosed with multiple sclerosis. He was stripped of his right to practice a profession of doctor and in October 2019 started working as a paramedic. Dominika's health is still worsening and Marcin is taking care of her. Dominika's father, Mr. Grec, is a famous public prosecutor. Marcin and Dominika have a daughter, Emilia Molenda. In November 2024 Molenda learnt that he also has a 16-years old son, Damian Słoma
- Krzysztof Radwan (Mateusz Damięcki) is a gynaecologist who works in Leśna Góra. Radwan was married and his eight-month pregnant wife died after being injured in a car accident and eventually died. In hospital Piotr Gawryło tried to save her but he failed. Radwan was accusing Gawryło of killing his wife and had a romance with Gawryło's wife, Hana Goldberg, also a gynaecologist. Hana fell pregnant and in 2016 gave birth to Radwan's child, a son Jakub, who is being raised by Gawryło as his legal child. Radwan then had another romance with Sylwia Mróz-Dębska, a married neurosurgeon which resulted in him being seriously injured by Sylwia's husband Robert Dębski. Radwan is now single.
- Stefan Tretter (Piotr Garlicki) is a pediatric surgeon and former director of a hospital. He was dating Danuta Dębska when he was married to his first wife. When Danuta fell pregnant and wanted to tell him about that, Stefan told her that his wife was daying from cancer and ended his romance. Danuta gave birth to a stillborn son. They met again in 2000 when Stefan started working as a surgeon in Leśna Góra. Their meeting led to their second romance and subsequent wedding. Danuta suddenly died in April 2004. Stefan had a brief romance with Ewa Żak but remains single.
- Barbara Wilczewska born Król (Agnieszka Pilaszewska) is a neurosurgeon and orthopaedist who came to Leśna Góra from Szczecin in September 2018. She was diagnosed with a tumour in her brain and was operated in February 2019 by Artur Bart. After that she was a coma for a few months but recovered. In September 2019 she came back to her work. Barbara is a daughter of Cezary Król (Daniel Olbrychski). In early 2019 she met her unknown granddaughter, Matylda Smuda. Matylda and her great-grandfather Cezary share a passion for horses.
- Michał Wilczewski (Mateusz Janicki) is a surgeon who started his work in Leśna Góra in 2018. He was then engaged and met his former lover, Katarzyna Smuda. They had another romance for a few weeks and Michał learnt that Katarzyna's daughter Matylda Smuda was his biological child. Michał successfully rebuilt his relationship with his daughter, even despite her being raised by Andrzej Falkowicz. Michał is a son of Barbara Wilczewska and grandson of Cezary Król. In November 2019 he admitted that he was in love with Hanna Sikorka and they dated. He has a son, Cezary Wilczewski with his fiancee, Olena Kosenko (Tetiana Melkova), a pediatrician.
- Agata Woźnicka (Emilia Komarnicka-Klynstra) is an internist who works in Leśna Góra since November 2008 and is hospital's current medical director. She studied medicine in Wrocław with Wiktoria Consalida and Przemysław Zapała. Agata was hit by a car driven by Tomasz Burski and was temporally disabled. She had brief romances with Przemysław Zapała, Witold Latoszek (it led to the break of his marriage with Milena Starska) and Marek Rogalski. Agata was married to Paweł (Maciej Marczewski) but their marriage was annulled after it was revealed that he had a legal wife in Ireland. In November 2017 she decided to make a journey around the world and quit her job. She was at the time dating Szczepan Lipski. Her unknown grandmother, Irena Aleksandrowicz (Barbara Horowianka) died at Leśna Góra hospital in November 2016 and left her her home. Agata has one brother, Hubert Woźnicki (Piotr Nowak) who have suffered from posttraumatic stress disorder after an accident in a mine. His symptoms led to a car accident in which Antonina Soszyńska and Magdalena Soszyńska were injured.
- Tadeusz Borucki (Marcin Urbanek) is a doctor who workes in Leśna Góra since October 2019. He was previously dating Kazimiera Radlica.
- Maksymilian Beger (Tomasz Ciachorowski) is a cardiac surgeon who workes in Leśna Góra since 2020. He has a relationship with fellow doctor, Gloria Krasucka.
- Jadwiga Ziemiańska (Renata Berger) is an anaesthiologist who workes at Leśna Góra hospital since November 1999. She is currently the longest working doctor at that hospital.

=== Former threads ===
- Genowefa Burczyk (Zofia Merle) was a cafe owner at Leśna Góra hospital. She had a daughter, Mariola and a grandson, Jacek. She was an aunt of Kazimierz Bąk (Paweł Burczyk). In March 2001 she was fired from hospital for fortune telling for patients - as a result, some patients resigned from treatment and their live was in danger.
- Amelia Burska, born 2001 in Leśna Góra is a daughter of Jakub Burski and his wife, Zofia Stankiewicz. She was born with a heart disease and was operated after birth in Warsaw. Her parents opened a foundation called Amelia to help other children with heart diseases.
- Jakub Burski (Artur Żmijewski) was a surgeon who worked in Leśna Góra from November 1999 to February 2012. Jakub was born in 1965 in Warsaw. His parents were Jan Burski (professor of medicine from Boston) and his wife, Barbara Burska (former university teacher). He is married to Zofia Stankiewicz since 2001 and has three children: Tomasz Burski (born 1983), Julia Burska (born 1993) and Amelia Burska (born 2001). After graduating from medicine in Warsaw, Jakub moved to Boston, United States to work at his father's clinic. In late 1999 he came to Leśna Góra, Poland, to sell his house and move permanently to United States. His planes changed when he learnt that he had a teenage son, Tomasz Kozal, who was born after a one night stand with Iwona Kozal in Toruń in 1982, and after he met his former girlfriend, Zofia Stankiewicz, a new anaesthiologist at Leśna Góra hospital. In early 2000 Jakub was expecting a child with hospital's administrative director, Agata Kwiecińska, and they got engaged. They split after Agata miscarried a child, because Jakub was in love with Zofia. Burski and Stankiewicz married in a religious ceremony in Leśna Góra in 2001. Jakub adopted Julia Nowak, a girl who was orphanaged in November 1999 when her parents died in a car accident. Zofia, who was believed to be infertile, fell pregnant and in December 2001 gave birth to their daughter Amelia.
- Tomasz Burski, born Kozal (Bartosz Obuchowicz) was a doctor who worked in Warsaw. Tomasz was born on 4 September 1983 in Toruń. His parents were Jakub Burski and Iwona Kozal, who had a one night stand during New Year's Eve celebrations in 1982. Jakub, then 18-years old medicine student from Warsaw, left Iwona and was not aware of her pregnancy. Iwona died in a car accident. Tomasz, raised by his maternal grandparents, learnt that Burski was his father and fought him in Leśna Góra in late 1999. Jakub decided to take care of Tomasz and later became his legal father. In 2001 his father married Zofia Stankiewicz, an anaesthiologist, and she became Tomasz's stepmother. Tomasz had also two sisters, Julia Burska (adopted) and Amelia Burska (paternal half-sister). Burski graduated from medicine in Warsaw and later worked as a hospital in Warsaw. He was dating Agnieszka Walicka and Anna Bochenek.
- Wiktoria Manuela Consalida (Katarzyna Dąbrowska) was a surgeon who worked at Leśna Góra hospital from November 2008 to October 2019. Wiktoria was born in 1983. Her parents were Wanda Consalida and her unnamed Spanish husband. She is married to Jose Rodriguez Perez since 2019 and has three children: Blanka Consalida (born 1999), Pedro Rodriguez Consalida (born 2021) and Adam Rodriguez Consalida (born 2021). Wiktoria graduated from medicine in Wrocław in 2008 and started her work in Leśna Góra with her boyfriend, Przemysław Zapała. They split, because Consalida didn't tell Zapała that she had a daughter, born when she was 16, with her former teacher, Wojciech Sarnecki. Wiktoria missed the 2024 January wedding of her daughter, because one of her sons was diagnosed with sepsis and she had to come back from airport to stay with him at hospital. In 2025 she worked and lived in United States. In May 2025 Wiktoria became a 42-years old grandmother when her granddaughter Nina was born in Leśna Góra.
- Dariusz Depczyk (Marek Barbasiewicz) was an internist who worked at Leśna Góra hospital from April 2000 to May 2005. He was married and had one son, Maciej Depczyk.
- Danuta Dębska-Tretter (Daria Trafankowska) was a nurse who worked at Leśna Góra hospital from November 1999 to April 2004. Danuta was married to Stefan Tretter from 2001. In the late 1980s she had a romance with Stefan Tretter, a surgeon, who was at the time married. Danuta fell pregnant. When she wanted to tell Stefan that she's expecting his child, he told her, that his wife was diagnosed with cancer and that he couldn't left her. Danuta gave birth to a stillborn son. She later married Władysław Dębski and couldn't have more children. She divorced Władysław, because he bit her and was addicted to alcohol and morphine. Stefan was unaware of her pregnancy until 2001, when they met at Leśna Góra hospital. They eventually married.
- Abdul Dialo (Barry Abdullaje) was an anaesthiologist who worked at Leśna Góra hospital. He moved to Poland from his native Guinea in 1993. He had one brother. In 2000 he was shot, alongside Bruno Walicki.
- Małgorzata Donovan, born Stankiewicz (Małgorzata Ostaszewska) was an administrative director of Leśna Góra hospital. Her parents were Andrzej Stankiewicz and his unnamed wife. She was married to Robert Donovan and had one child, Igor Donovan (born 2008).
- Joanna Gawryło (Monika Kaleńska) is an oncologist who workes at Leśna Góra hospital. She was married to Piotr Gawryło (until their divorce in January 2023) and has one legal son, Jakub Gawryło.
- Piotr Gawryło (Marek Bukowski) was a surgeon and transplantologist who worked at Leśna Góra hospital from April 2010 to March 2018. He was married to Hana Gawryło (2013-2016) and to Joanna Gawryło and had two children: Antonina Soszyńska (biological daughter) and Jakub Gawryło (legal son). He died on 19 January 2022, after leaving his second wife and son.
- Hana Goldberg (Kamilla Baar-Kochańska) was a gynaecologist and neonatologist who worked in Leśna Góra from June 2011 to 2014. Her parents were Julian Zapała and his Isrealian lover, her legal father was Mr. Goldberg. She was married to Piotr Gawryło and had one son, Jakub Gawryło (born 2016). She came to Leśna Góra in June 2011 to meet her paternal half-brother, Przemysław Zapała; she also had four maternal half-sisters, including Mira Goldberg and Sara Mandel. Hana married Piotr Gawryło on 18 September 2013 in a civil ceremony at Leśna Góra hospital. Hana and Piotr wanted to have a child but they failed. Hana betrayed Piotr, who was busy with taking care of his daughter, Antonina Soszyńska. After a one night stand with Krzysztof Radwan in November 2015, Hana fell pregnant.
- Krzysztof Jędras (Andrzej Bienias) was an orthopaedist who worked at Leśna Góra hospital from February 2009 to January 2012. He was married to Monika Zybert and had one legal child, Hanna Zybert-Jędras (born 2004). His father was from Kraków, Poland and his mother was from Tatry Mountains. On 11 September 2009 he married Monika Zybert and later adopted her daughter, Hanna.
- Hanna Kalinowska (Hanna Dunowska) was a pediatrician who worked at Leśna Góra hospital from May 2000 to January 2011.
- Michał Kalita (Leon Niemczyk) was a widowed father of Elżbieta Walicka. He married Gabriela Krukowska (Emilia Krakowska) on November 5, 2000. His daughter died in December 2002. He had three grandchildren. Gabriela was a close friend of Burski family and a nanny of Jakub Burski. For many years she lived with them in Boston, United States. She came back to Poland with Jakub Burski in November 1999 as he planned to sell his house and move to Boston permanently. He changed his plans after meeting his unknown son, Tomasz Kozal. Gabriela met Michał when he visited Jakub Burski in Leśna Góra.
- Edyta Kuszyńska (Olga Bończyk) was an anaesthiologist who worked at Leśna Góra hospital from February 2001 to November 2010. She was born in 1965. Her parents were deaf and she knew a sign language. Edyta studied medicine in Warsaw with Jakub Burski, Zofia Stankiewicz and Bruno Walicki. During studies she was in a romantic relationship with Burski, and later had a romance with him while he was married to Zofia.
- Agata Kwiecińska-Depczyk, born Kwiecińska (Dorota Segda) was a financial director of Leśna Góra hospital from November 1999 to 2005. Her father left family to live with another woman when Agata was ten years old. Agata was married to Maciej Depczyk. In late 1999 she had a romance with Jakub Burski which resulted in her pregnancy. Jakub, being in love with Zofia Stankiewicz, was ready to propose to Agata and start a family with her, but Agata miscarried in March 2000 and they split. She was then dating an internist, Dariusz Depczyk (Marek Barbasiewicz) and his son, Maciej Depczyk (Krzysztof Zawadzki). She eventually married Maciej, a lawyer, and after some problems with mafia they moved abroad.
- Szczepan Lipski (Kamil Kula) is a nurse and former cleaner who workes in Leśna Góra. He was previously dating Agata Woźnicka, until her department in November 2017. In October 2019 he proposed to Lina Lipska (Izabela Perez), an immigrant from Jemen, who suffers from lymphoma, to let her continue her oncological treatment in Poland. They married in a civil ceremony on December 11, 2019, and she got Polish citizenship.
- Sara Mandel, born Goldberg (Magdalena Schejbal) was a gynaecologist who worked at Leśna Góra hospital from December 2016 to February 2018. Her mother was Polish-Jewish and she was raised in Tel Aviw, Israel. She had three sisters, including Mira Goldberg, and one maternal half-sister, Hana Goldberg. Sara was married to a professor of medicine from Boston, United States, twenty years older. In December 2016 Sara came from Boston to Leśna Góra to perform an operation of an unborn son of Aleksandra Pietrzak.
- Jacek Mejer (Cezary Kosiński) was a surgeon who worked at Leśna Góra hospital from April 2000 to March 2010.
- Mikołaj Mellado (Robert Janowski) was a musician who lived in Leśna Góra. In late 1999 he was engaged to marry Zofia Stankiewicz, an anaesthesiologist, who moved from Cracow to live with Mikołaj. Their wedding was called off when Zofia learnt that Mikołaj was dating men, including Daniel Stolarski. Mikołaj was hospitalized after a suicide attempt. There he met Monika Zybert and they were in a romantic relationship.
- Adam Pawica (Andrzej Zieliński) was an internist who worked at Leśna Góra hospital from November 1999 to December 2011. He had a brother, a violinist, who committed suicide after losing two fingers in an accident - as a result he couldn't play violine anymore.
- Oliwia Popławska (Marta Bryła) came to Leśna Góra in 2017 in last weeks of her pregnancy. She lived in Bydgoszcz where she had a one-night stand with Adam Krajewski and fell pregnant. Oliwia met Adam and told him about their child. At the time, Adam was in love with Wiktoria Consalida and planned to marry her. Oliwia stayed in Leśna Góra and gave birth to her son, Józef Andrzej Krajewski, in October 2017. Adam died in September 2018. Oliwia is dating Paweł Gracz (Marcin Sianko), a radiologist, since late 2018. On October 2, 2019, she started her work in Leśna Góra as an electroradiology technician.
- Hanna Sikorka (Marta Żmuda Trzebiatowska) is an orthopaedist. Hanna is a daughter of Ludwik Sikorka (Artur Janusiak) and Lucyna Sikorka (Anna Samusionek). Her mother left a family for an unknown reason many years ago and came back in March 2019. Her father is in a prison as he was accused of causing a railway accident. In 2019 Lucyna took bribes from Hanna's patients in Hanna's name, leading to her daughter having serious trouble. Hanna confessed in November 2019 that she was in love in Michał Wilczewski and they started dating. Lucyna Sikorka started her work in Leśna Góra in November 2019 as a cleaner. In 2024 Hanna fell pregnant and moved out from Leśna Góra with her partner, Miłosz. On 9 April 2025 in Sweden she gave birth to their daughter, Marta Drabik.
- Zofia Stankiewicz-Burska, born Stankiewicz (Małgorzata Foremniak) was an anaesthesiologist who worked in Leśna Góra from November 1999 to November 2012. She was born on 18 May 1965 in Krosno. Her parents were Andrzej Stankiewicz and his unnamed wife. She is married to Jakub Burski and has three children: Tomasz Burski (stepson, born 1983), Julia Burska (adopted, born 1993) and Amelia Burska (born 2001). She graduated from medicine in Warsaw and then worked as a doctor in Cracow, where she was married and divorced. In late 1999 she was engaged to marry Mikołaj Mellado, a musician, and moved to Leśna Góra to live with him. They split in early 2000 because it was revealed that Mikołaj was in romantic relathionships with men. Zofia then married in a realigious ceremony in Leśna Góra Jakub Burski, her former boyfriend, whom she met again upon starting a new work at Leśna Góra hospital. She thought that she was infertile, but she fell pregnant and gave birth to a daughter, Amelia. Zofia and her sister Małgorzata were separated when they were children - Małgorzata moved to Australia with their father and Zofia stayed in Krosno with their mother.
- Bruno Walicki (Krzysztof Pieczyński) is a surgeon who worked in Leśna Góra from November 1999 to February 2004 and for some time was hospital's director. He was married to Elżbieta Walicka (Ewa Skibińska) and they had two children: Agnieszka Walicka (Karolina Borkowska) and Paweł Walicki (Jan Prosiński). In December 2002, while pregnant with their third child, Elżbieta was hit by a car and died hours after giving birth to their son, Stanisław Walicki. Bruno then had a relationship with Monika Zybert and planned to marry her but then changed his mind and left Monika unaware that she was pregnant with their child. Walicki moved to Stockholm, Sweden and married there a Swedish doctor. He has never met his daughter, Hanna Zybert, who was born in 2004 and is raised as a legal child of Monika's husband, Krzysztof Jędras. Agnieszka was dating Tomasz Burski, son of Jakub and Zofia, for a few years but they split when Agnieszka hasn't passed a secondary school certificate and decided to move to United States. There she had a romance with and older, married man named Paul. She fell pregnant but aborted her child. Agnieszka came back to Poland and discovered that Hanna was her half-sister. As of now, Bruno, Agnieszka, Paweł and Stanisław live in Sweden.
- Bożysława Van Der Graaf, born Leszczyńska (Edyta Jungowska) was a nurse who worked at Leśna Góra hospital from April 2000 to February 2012. She had four brother and prior to her work in Leśna Góra, she was married and divorced four times. Bożysława married Marek Zbieć, a former prisoner, whom she met when he was a patient at her ward. Marek went missing after he learnt that we was infertile, was found many years later and eventually died. Bożysława married Ruud Van Der Graaf, an anaesthiologist, and gave birth to their son. She moved to Amsterdam, the Netherlands.
- Przemysław Zapała (Marcin Rogacewicz) is a surgeon who worked in Leśna Góra from November 2008 to September 2018. He is a son of Julian and Małgorzata Zapała and had a paternal half-sister, Hana Goldberg, whom he met in June 2011. Przemysław graduated from medicine in Wrocław in 2008 and started his work in Leśna Góra. At the time, he was dating Wiktoria Consalida. They split in 2010 when Przemysław learnt that Wiktoria had a teenaged daughter, Blanka Consalida. Then he was in a relationship with Ludmiła Papierniak (Paulina Chruściel), a painter. She was diagnosed with a brain cancer. Ludmiła died on October 17, 2012, in Haifa, Israel, after a surgery, leaving Przemysław in a mourning. Zapała had a one-night stand with Aleksandra Pietrzak which resulted in a pregnancy. His daughter Franciszka Zapała was born on April 30, 2014, in Leśna Góra. In September 2018 Przemysław moved to Sweden with Aleksandra and her two children.
- Marek Zbieć (Paweł Wilczewski) was a cleaner and later paramedic who works at Leśna Góra hospital from February 2001 to November 2003. He was a son of Maria Zbieć and an unknown father (in 2001 it was mentioned that his father was named Ignacy). Marek was raised only by his mother, but when she was to sick to take care of him, he lived for three years in an orphanage. Marek was married to Bożysława Leszczyńska.
- Tadeusz Zybert (Marian Opania) is a surgeon and professor medicine who worked in Leśna Góra from November 1999 to March 2017. For many years he was a hospital's director. Tadeusz married Lucyna Zybert in 1966 and were married to her until her death of cancer in 1995. They had one daughter, Monika Zybert-Jędras (Jolanta Fraszyńska). Monika graduated from medicine in 1999 and started her work in Leśna Góra as an internist. She was interested in psychiatry. Monika was dating Mikołaj Mellado and then Bruno Walicki. She fell pregnant by Bruno but didn't tell him about that because he decided to leave her and move to Stockholm, Sweden. Zybert gave birth to her daughter Hanna Zybert on October 31, 2004, in Leśna Góra. On September 11, 2009, she married Krzysztof Jędras (Andrzej Bienias), an orthopaedist who adopted her child. Tadeusz was diagnosed with Parkinson's disease and had a short romance with his widowed sister-in-law, Klara Zybert (Magdalena Zawadzka). Their romance ended when it was revealed that Klara was taking bribes from Tadeusz's patients.
- Jorge Larsson (Adrian Zaremba) is a doctor who workes in Leśna Góra since October 2019. He is half-Swedish and studied medicine in Sweden. In October 2019, he started his work at ambulance with Marcin Molenda.
- Antoni Kos (Marcin Przybylski) is a doctor who workes in Leśna Góra since September 2019. He worked in a refugee camp in Jemen and took a girl Lina, who had a cancer, to Leśna Góra on September 18, 2019. His friend in Hanna Sikorka.
- Zdzisław, called Zdzisiek (Jakub Gąsowski) is a cleaner who workes in Leśna Góra hospital since October 2, 2019.
- Kazimiera Radlica, called Kazia (Zuzanna Lit) is a doctor who workes in Leśna Góra since October 2019. Kazia graduated from medicine in 2019. She is disabled after being injured in a car rally. She was previously dating Tadeusz Borucki. On October 2, 2019, Artur Bart invited her to start her career in Leśna Góra.

== List of main characters' departures ==
Date	Character (actor)	Storyline	Reason
March 6, 2024	Hanna Sikorka; Marta Żmuda Trzebiatowska	Hanna learnt that she was pregnant and left Leśna Góra with her partner Miłosz	the actress decided to leave the series to pursue new projects
March 17, 2021	Katarzyna Smuda; Ilona Ostrowska	Katarzyna she died in the Leśna Góra's hospital in the explosions.	the actress was forced to leave the series due to her role in another series, Ranczo
October 23, 2019	Wiktoria Consalida; Katarzyna Dąbrowska	Wiktoria moved to her native Spain with her new boyfriend, Jose Rodriguez Perez to start her new life	the actress decided to leave the series to take part in other projects
September 12, 2018	Aleksandra Pietrzak; Anna Karczmarczyk	Aleksandra moved to Sweden with her boyfriend Przemysław Zapała and her two children	the actress decided to leave the series to take part in other projects
September 10, 2018	Milena Starska; Anita Sokołowska	nothing was mentioned about Milena's future; she was just not seen anymore in hospital	the actress decided to leave the series to play in other TV series, Przyjaciółki
September 5, 2018	Adam Krajewski; Grzegorz Daukszewicz	Krajewski died as a result of a heart attack, after saving the lives of two drowning teenagers and his girlfriend, Wiktoria Consalida. There was waters in the belly, and Adam is on the grave.	the actor decided to leave the series to take part in other projects
November 15, 2017	Agata Woźnicka; Emilia Komarnicka-Klynstra	.Agata returned in 2019 year in the poland.	the actress decided to quit her role due to pregnancy.Returned in 2019
December 21, 2016	Klaudia Miller; Julia Wyszyńska	Klaudia on her wedding day with Rafał Konica learned that he spent a night with his former fiancée, Marta Kozioł; she broke off their engagement and moved to Germany to pursue her medical career	the actress decided to leave the series to take part in other projects
November 11, 2016	Hana Goldberg; Kamilla Baar-Kochańska	Hana says "OUCH!" in a car accident in Israel, leaving her husband Piotr Gawryło. Hana died in car, leaving Piotr Gawryło.	the actress decided to leave the series to take part in other projects
September 7, 2016	Jan Stanisławski; Krzysztof Kwiatkowski	Jan died in hospital after being shot during a terrorist attack; he died on his wedding day with Aleksandra Pietrzak, who was pregnant with their son	the character's death was not the actor's decision
March 25, 2015	Michał Sambor; Radosław Krzyżowski	it was not mentioned what happened to Michał, the character of Michal was not seen anymore	the actor decided not to sign another contract with producers and began acting in a similar series, Na sygnale
November 26, 2014	Magdalena Soszyńska; Anna Dereszowska	after Piotr Gawryło decided to be in a relationship with Hana Goldberg, Magdalena decided to move abroad with their daughter	the actor who created Piotr Gawryło wanted his character to be in a romantic relationship with Hana Goldberg rather than with Magdalena Soszyńska
November 14, 2012	Zofia Stankiewicz-Burska; Małgorzata Foremniak	Zofia moved with her husband and daughter Amelia to Berlin	the actress left the series after Żmijewski's role ended and due to her lack of interest in playing the role any longer
October 17, 2012	Ludmiła Papierniak; Paulina Chruściel	Ludmiła died in Israel from cancer, leaving her fiancé Przemysław Zapała	the character was intended to be in only a few episodes but she was seen for more than a year; she was also seen in 2013 as a ghost in Przemysław Zapała's dreams
February 10, 2012	Jakub Burski; Artur Żmijewski	Jakub moved with his family to Berlin to pursue his medical career	the actor decided to leave the series to play a main role in another series, Ojciec Mateusz
December 2, 2011	Adam Pawica; Andrzej Zieliński		the actor left the series to take part in other projects
November 11, 2011	Tomasz Burski; Bartosz Obuchowicz	Tomasz graduated from medicine and moved to Warsaw to work as a surgeon	the actor left the series after his storyline ended and to take part in other projects
June 17, 2011	Marta Kozioł; Katarzyna Bujakiewicz	Marta fell in love with her fitness trainer and moved with him to the United States, leaving her boyfriend Rafał Konica and their three children; she came back in February 2016 when her daughter was seriously injured in a car accident and later died	the actress left the series due to her pregnancy and to take part in another project; she came back in 2016
October 23, 2005	Agnieszka Walicka; Karolina Borkowska	Agnieszka moved to Sweden to live with her father and brothers	the actress decided to leave the series and to end her career; she hasn't played any role since 2005
June 12, 2005	Agata Kwiecińska-Depczyk; Dorota Segda	Agata and her husband moved abroad	the storyline was ended due to lack of interest in this character
June 9, 2004	Danuta Dębska-Tretter; Daria Trafankowska	Danuta died of an aneurysm in the summer of 2004	the actress died on June 9, 2004, of pancreatic cancer
February 8, 2004	Bruno Walicki; Krzysztof Pieczyński	Bruno moved to Sweden with his two sons, leaving his pregnant girlfriend Monika Zybert; it was mentioned in December 2005 that he married a Swedish doctor	the actor decided to leave the series due to boredom in playing the character
November 9, 2003	Marek Zbieć; Paweł Wilczak	after learning that he was infertile, Marek left home and was declared missing; in February 2008 he was admitted to a hospital in a serious condition and died (a part played by another actor)	the actor decided to leave the series to take part in other projects
December 1, 2002	Elżbieta Walicka; Ewa Skibińska	Elżbieta was pregnant with her third child when she was hit by a car; she was admitted to a hospital, gave birth to her son and died the same day	the actress decided to leave the series because she thought that the character's storylines had come to an end and she wanted to take part in other projects
