= Dorota Segda =

Polish actress (born 1966)

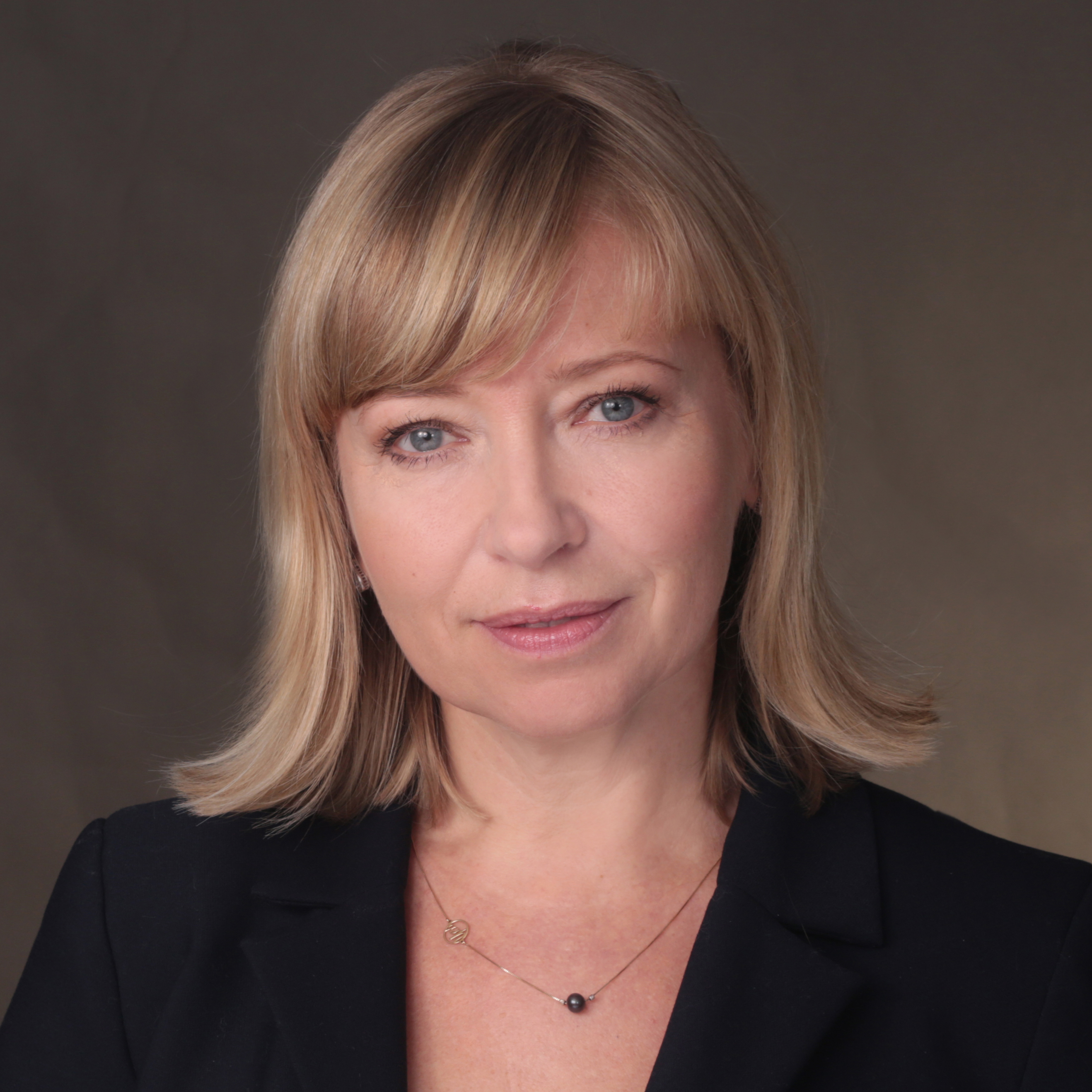
- Dorota Segda
- Born: Dorota Segda; 12 February 1966 (age 60); Kraków, Poland
- Occupation: Actor
- Years active: 1987–present
- Partner: Stanisław Radwan

Dorota Segda (born 12 February 1966) in Kraków, Poland, is a Polish theatre, film and television actress. Besides acting, she is also a Professor of Theatre Arts, and the Rector since 2016, at the AST National Academy of Theatre Arts in Kraków. In 2015, she was awarded Poland's Silver Medal for Merit to Culture – Gloria Artis.

Segda graduated from the Jan III Sobieski High School and the Ludwik Solski Academy for the Dramatic Arts, both in Kraków. She has been an actress of Kraków's Old Theatre, the Helena Modrzejewska National Stary Theater, since 1987. Her theatrical career at the Stary Theater includes Albertine's role in the Operetka by Witold Gombrowicz (1988), Salome in Sen srebrny Salomei (1993), and Marguerite in Faust by Johann Wolfgang Goethe (1997). She twice won the Zelwerowicz Award for best actress or actor awarded by the editors of the Polish theatre magazine, Teatr, first in the 1992/1993 season, for the role of Salome, and then in the 1996/1997 season, for the role of Margaret in Faust.

Between 1997 and 2000, she also worked at the National Theatre in Warsaw and played Rachela in Stanisław Wyspiański's Wesele (2000). To date, she has performed over fifty roles on the theatre stage.

Segda's film and television roles include her debut film role as the identical twins in Ildikó Enyedi's My 20th Century (Hungarian: Az én XX. századom 1989), the title role in the film Faustina (Polish: Faustyna 1995) as well as roles in the film, Tato (1995) and the television show, Na dobre i na złe (For Better And For Worse 1999–present). In the Polish dub of the films Harry Potter and the Order of the Phoenix (2007) and Harry Potter and the Half-Blood Prince (2009), Segda voiced the character of Bellatrix Lestrange, played by Helena Bonham Carter. Since 2010, she has mostly worked on television, such as Artyści (2016) and in the long running series, Dziewczyny ze Lwowa (2015-2019) and Echo serca (2019–present). In 2012 Segda was made a Member of the Polish Film Academy.

Segda is the granddaughter of Władysław Segda, double Olympic bronze medallist in fencing. Since 2001, she has been married to the Polish composer, Stanisław Radwan.
