= La Femme Nikita =

La Femme Nikita may refer to:

- La Femme Nikita (film), a 1990 French action film by Luc Besson, originally named "Nikita"
- La Femme Nikita (TV series), a 1997–2001 TV series based on the film, also called "Nikita"
- Nikita (TV series), a 2010–2013 TV series based on the film and 1997 TV series
- Point of No Return (1993 film), a 1993 U.S. remake of the French film
- Black Cat (1991 film), a 1991 Hong Kong remake of the French film

== See also ==
- Nikita (disambiguation)
- Femme (disambiguation)
