= Magnat (film) =

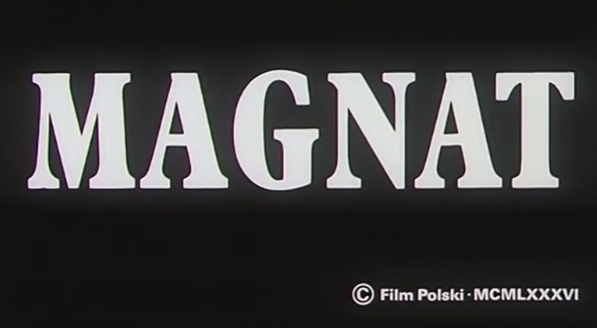
- Directed by: Filip Bajon
- Written by: Filip Bajon
- Starring: Jan Nowicki; Olgierd Łukaszewicz; Jan Englert; Bogusław Linda; Grażyna Szapołowska; Alfred Struwe
- Cinematography: Piotr Sobociński
- Music by: Jerzy Satanowski
- Production company: Studio Filmowe TOR
- Release date: 21 December 1987
- Running time: 171 minutes
- Country: Poland
- Languages: Polish; German; Silesian

Magnat is a 1987 Polish historical drama film directed by Filip Bajon.

In 2004 Magnat was included in a book listing 100 Polish films.

== Plot ==
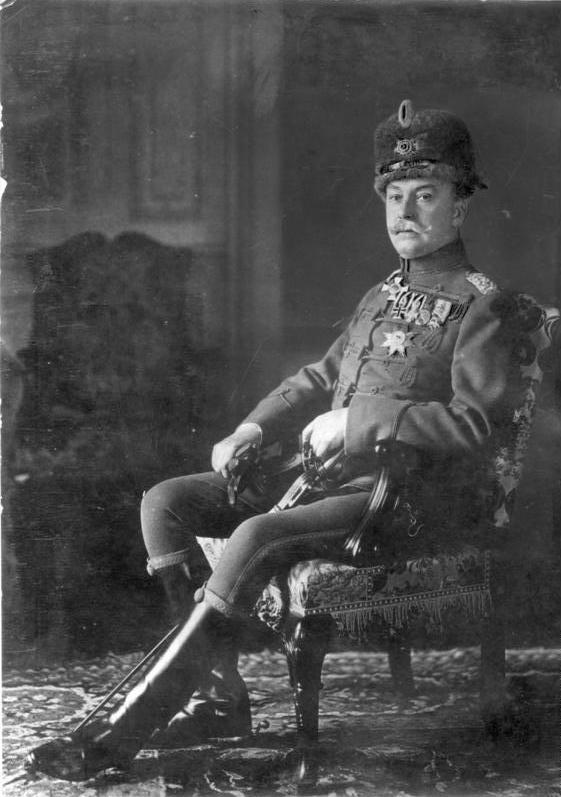
The film was based on the life of Prince of Pless, Hans Heinrich XV.

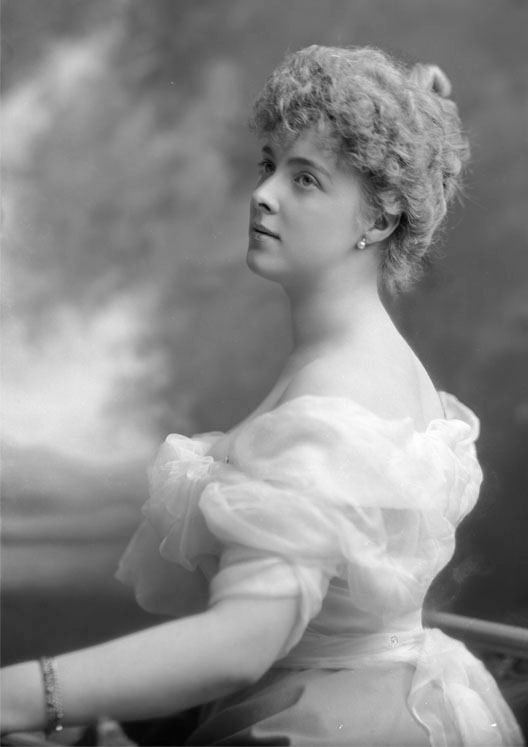
Daisy, Princess of Pless.

In the year 1900, the German Emperor, Wilhelm II, was invited to a bison hunt at the hunting lodge and estate of wealthy industrialist and businessman Prince Hans Heinrich XV (of the von Teuss family) in Prussian Silesia. The emperor, satisfied with the diplomatic services of the Prince for the country and charmed by his young wife Daisy, offers him a profitable position. The Prince is obliged to choose: either become the Great Huntsman of the Crown and receive additional land for building new factories, coal mines and manufacturing plants, or become an Ambassador of the German Empire in London. Although under the constant pressure of his wife to choose the position of an ambassador, Hans Heinrich decides to choose the position of the Great Huntsman of the Empire. Distressed, Princess Daisy later turns to the Emperor for help in order to escape from her tyrannical, cynical and obsessed husband. Upon the Kaiser's refusal, she becomes involved in a scandalous affair that would later have devastating consequences on the von Teuss family and her marriage. The Prince eventually divorced Daisy in the 1920s.

Upon receiving the land from Wilhelm II, Hans Heinrich XV, while taking part in an event near his residential palace, decides to give the gained territories to his German loyal servant, court adviser and collaborator, Heinberg. Clever Heinberg, with obvious knowledge of the surrounding natural resources, decides to build a coal mine instead of keeping the forest intact and becomes the initiator of the newly established and later very successful company Heinberg Gruppe. Soon Heinberg exclaims that his ancestors have served the von Teuss family for decades and he shall be the last one to be a "slave" at his estate. The Prince, initially shocked but later comfortable with the tight situation, made a mistake that would later cost him his entire investment in the mines and affect his involvement in the Central-Western European and global trade market. Heinberg, upon becoming a shareholder, eventually would take over his entire business.

In 1932, the workers and the administration of the von Teuss coal mine factory complex receive distressing news: they believe that the Prince is dying at his palace in Pszczyna which became part of the newly established Second Polish Republic following World War I. One of the office workers called Nelke, with all respect, believes that his death should be celebrated and by turning on the sirens, he accidentally kills one of the diggers/workers in the mine (distracted by the noise of the siren, he was crushed by a barrow). Later the entire staff blames Nelke for this and the diggers demand higher wages for the family of the deceased. The Prince, hearing the noises from the outside, states that he shall not die as more work is to be done around the industry. This worries his youngest son Bolko, who has recently fallen in love with his young stepmother Marisca, a foreign adventuress in search of a profit.

At the same time, Franzel, the eldest of the three sons, visits the Heinberg Gruppe manufacturing plants in Westphalia, in Germany. He tries to collaborate with Heinberg in order to win back the lost assets that were sold by the von Teuss family to pay the large debts. To fully gain the trust of Heinberg, Franzel gets secretly involved in Nazi affairs and takes loans from the banks of the Third Reich.

Franzel and Conrad are later summoned to their father's residence to negotiate the inheritance conflict. Hans Heinrich, already paralysed and of weak health, argues that none of them should inherit such a large amount of debt therefore he decides to have another child with Marisca. This greatly angers his youngest son Bolko (already present at the residence), who is later blamed for spending all the remaining savings in casinos and other public areas. Conrad is blamed for having a homosexual relationship with Zbierski's son, thereby not being able to produce an heir, and Franzel is known to be sympathetic to Nazi policies. It is Franzel who gets chosen to be the head of the dynasty, as his father, already in a wheelchair, is unable to perform his duties.

Eventually after Hans Heinrich, with the help of his new loyal adviser, Manager Zbierski, known as Wróżka (future-teller), and his secretary Kazimierz, found out that all of the personal savings were sent to Hitler in order to secure the reputation of the Nazi party, he removes Franzel from office and places Conrad in charge. He later makes an announcement about his decision to the workers in the industrial district. Meanwhile, Bolko is arrested in Germany and suspected of fraud and spying on the Gestapo.

After being released from a Nazi prison, Bolko is safely transported to Poland, but unexpectedly dies soon upon arrival at the residence, while Franzel is excluded from the family and left without any income for which he curses his father. Following World War II, Conrad, already after the death of Prince Hans Heinrich, becomes the only heir to the fortune, but soon realizes that all of his possessions and estates, including the industrial district and the factories, were seized by the communist government of the Polish People's Republic. It is then that he realizes the struggle of his own family for something more important than money; that something was trust and love.

== Production ==
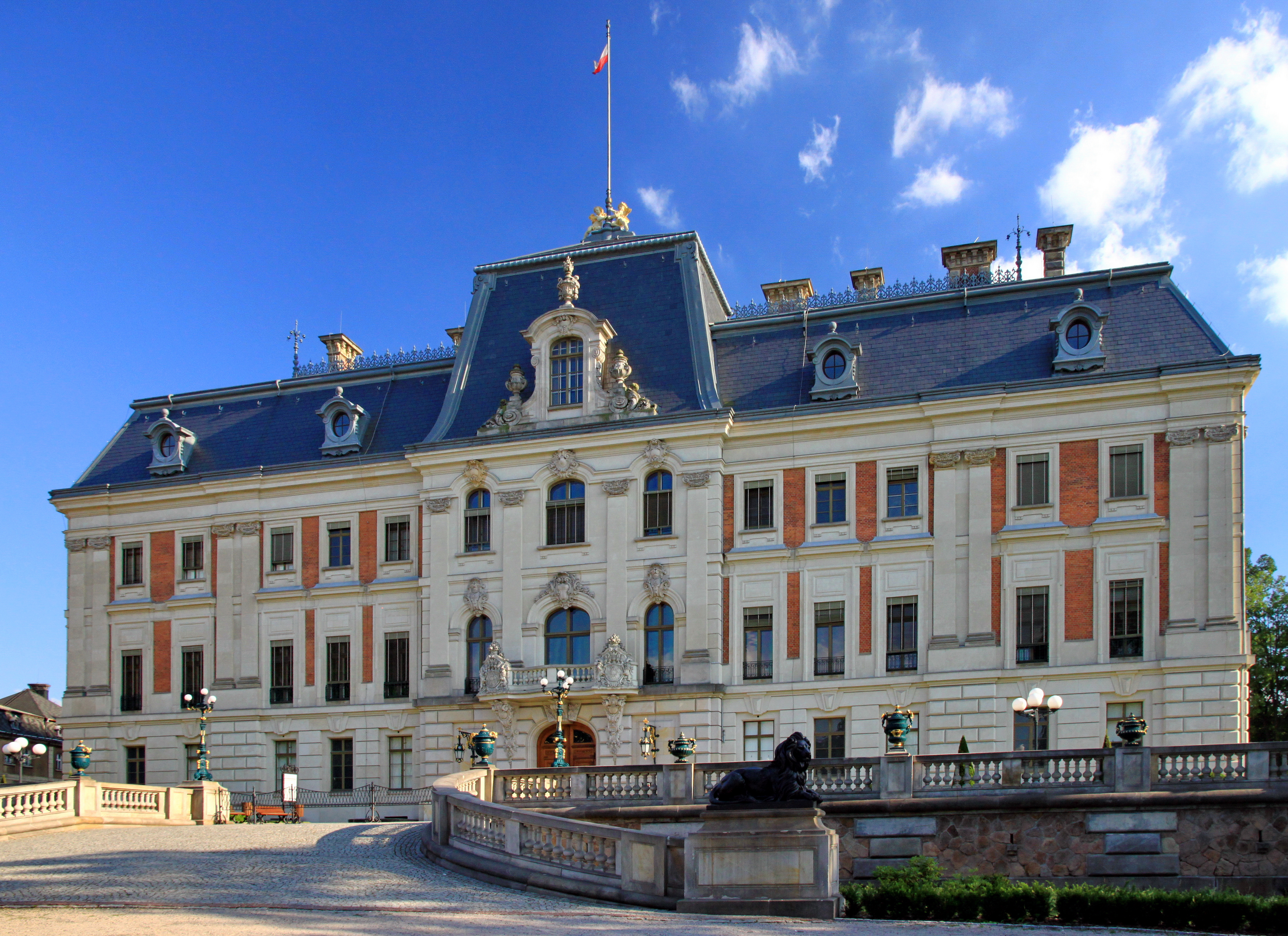
Pszczyna Castle.

Principal photography began a year earlier, with a planned schedule of approximately 2 weeks. The filming took place in the Upper and Lower Silesian Voivodeships in south-western Poland. The interior shots of the von Teuss family residence were filmed inside the actual Pszczyna Castle, the seat of the Princes of Pless, while exterior shots and the scenes were filmed around the town of Pszczyna, Książ and Bielsko-Biała. The scenes set in Nazi Germany were shot in Poznań and inside the Imperial Castle. Filip Bajon, the producer and director of the film, often complained about the exterior of the Castle, which was in a bad state. The facade of the complex needed immediate re-painting, but the city council refused to loan any money for restoration, believing that it was too costly and that the movie would earn no profit. Eventually Bajon decided that the charred facade from the fumes of the surrounding industrial district would ideally suit the context and plot of the overall film, focused on the dark secrets of a maniac and his deteriorating relationship with the princely family. Bajon also thought of making the movie completely in black and white to minimize the visible effect of air pollution when shots were made in colour, but later re-considered.

== Reception ==
The filmed was praised by both domestic and foreign movie critics. Bogusław Linda received from Film Polski (The Polish Film Industry) a special award for his performance in Gdynia, in 1987. Although known to be a masterpiece of the 1980s Polish cinema, the film was often criticized by the general public and some of the living members of the princely family for its historical inaccuracy, especially for the changing of names of the characters and other titles that may have confused the audience. Most notably the original aristocratic name "von Hochberg" was changed to "von Teuss".

Magnat is considered to be Filip Bajon's greatest production and one of the best Polish films of all time.

== Awards ==
- 1987 - Maria Gładkowska, Zbigniew Cybulski Award
- 1987 - Bogusław Linda, Best Actor of Gdynia Polish Film Festival
- 1987 - Filip Bajon, Special Jury Award of Gdynia Polish Film Festival
- 1987 - Piotr Sobociński, Chairman of the Cinematography Award
- 1988 - Filip Bajon, Chairman of the Committee of Cinematography Award

== Cast ==
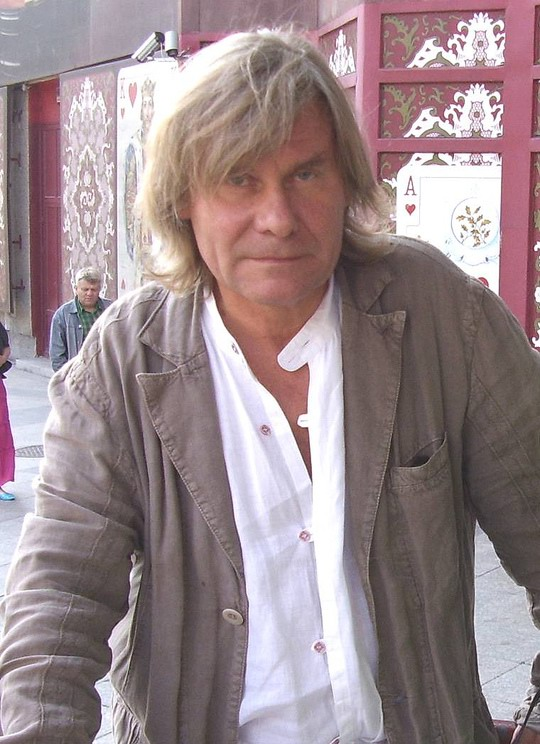
Filip Bajon.

Main Role	Actor
Manager Zbierski - The vice-president of the company and a close friend and collaborator of Hans Heinrich directly responsible for providing information about the industry. He appears during the sudden earthquake caused by the heavy mining in the area and warns the prince of his actions. Zbierski is eventually discharged from his duties and position later on after a dispute with the princely family. Furthermore, he organizes a demonstration of low-paid workers at the mine and also warns Hans about Franzel's secret collaboration with the Nazi party.	Jerzy Bińczycki
Hans Heinrich XV - Prince of Pless (Pszczyna) and the husband of Mary Theresa Olivia von Pless, also known as Princess Daisy and later Duchess Marisca. A member of one of the wealthiest European noble families, he is the owner of large estates and coal mines in Lower and Upper Silesia (Poland) which brought him enormous fortune and his extravagant lifestyle coupled with disastrous events and political and family scandals are tasty morsels for the international press. He is depicted as an evil character, unable to control his emotions as well as unable to deal with his sons' misfortunes. Despite that he is still responsible for the well-being of his family.	Jan Nowicki
Marisca - an adventuress, self-proclaimed Duchess and the second wife of Hans Heinrich, following his divorce with Daisy. She is represented as hot tempered, heartless woman with a strong attraction to money and wealth. She is fond of her husband, but hides a secret that could possibly destroy their relationship; an affair with youngest son Bolko. Furthermore, Marisca is despised and hated by Franzel and Conrad, who consider her as an obstacle between them and their deceptive father.	Grażyna Szapołowska
Franzel - the eldest son of Hans and Princes Daisy and an heir to the family fortune. He is often regarded as cruel, heartless, stubborn and seductive. His collaboration with the Gestapo, the Nazi party and Heinberg leads to the demonstration of workers and his eventual dismissal as manager by his father. Franzel is vindictive and often portrayed as a deceiver, who wishes to bring down Hans and Marisca. After Franzel's secrets are revealed, Conrad becomes the new heir and his future fate is unknown.	Olgierd Łukaszewicz
Bolko - the youngest of the three sons, who had an affair with his mother-in-law. He is careless about the family's future and prefers recreation to politics and business. His further gambling leads to even greater debt that destabilizes the financial situation. Towards the end he is caught by the SS and imprisoned, but released due to Franzel's and Conrad's joint intervention. Bolko later dies because of the poor treatment at the prison.	Bogusław Linda
Daisy - a noted society beauty in the Edwardian period, and a member of one of the wealthiest European noble families. She is the first wife of Hans Heinrich XV. During her marriage Daisy, known as the Princess of Pless, became a social reformer and militated for peace with her friends Wilhelm II, German Emperor and King Edward VII of the United Kingdom. Distressed Princess Daisy turns to the Emperor for help in order to escape from her tyrannical, cynical and obsessed husband. Upon the Kaiser's refusal she becomes involved in a scandalous affair that would later have devastating consequences on the von Teuss family and her marriage. The Prince eventually divorced Daisy in the 1920s.	Maria Gładkowska
Conrad - the middle son known for his scandalous same-sex relationship with Manager Zbierski's son Jurek. Just like his mother, he pursues the right path by caring for his siblings, but is rejected by Hans Heinrich, who sees and describes him as an obstacle to normality. He is eventually chosen to run the company after Franzel is dismissed.	Jan Englert
Heinberg - the former huntsman of the princely family, future opponent and a friend of Franzel. After receiving an area of land from the prince, he invests in constructing a mine to dig for coal, which bring him enormous fortune. Heinberg is represented as a greedy, selfish man with the hope of destroying the von Teuss family by using Franzel to manipulate his father's decisions.	Rolf Hoppe
Kazimierz - the private secretary of the princely family that is also in charge of the personnel at the residential palace. He often advises Hans Heinrich and is critical about his thoughts, but is unable to control or manipulate his decisions. He is depicted as a faithful servant and a kind man, who is troubled by the surrounding environment.	Zygmunt Bielawski
Foreman Grela - a worker in the mine and a close friend of Manager Zbierski. He is one of the co-organizers of the demonstration at the industrial district and is against of Franzel being in charge.	Jerzy Trela
Wilhelm II - the last German Kaiser and King of Prussia. He was invited for a bison hunt in the hunting lodge and estate of a wealthy industrialist and businessman Prince Hans Heinrich XV (of the von Teuss family) in German-controlled Silesia. The emperor, satisfied with the diplomatic services of the Prince for the country and charmed by his young wife Daisy, offers him a profitable position. The Prince is obliged to choose: either become the Great Huntsman of the Crown and receive additional land for building new factories, coal mines and manufacturing plants or become an Ambassador of the German Empire in London. Although under the constant pressure of his wife to choose the position of an ambassador, Hans Heinrich decides to choose the position of the Great Huntsman of the Empire.	Alfred Struwe
Gosche - a politician and diplomat responsible for the transaction of money between Franzel and the Nazi party. He secretly organizes a meeting with Joseph Goebbels.	Henryk Bista
Jurek Zbierski - the son of Manager Zbierski and long-time lover of Conrad, the middle son of Hans Heinrich. Their relationship begins after the victorious parade and a mass held on a square near the palace.	Marek Barbasiewicz

Minor Role	Actor
Doctor	Ryszard Mróz
Mathilda	Barbara Rachwalska
Jolanta's guardian	Czesława Pszczolińska
Missy	Mirosława Marcheluk
Nelke	Włodzimierz Musiał
Alojzy	Aleksander Fogiel
young Conrad	Rafał Wieczyński

== Main roles ==
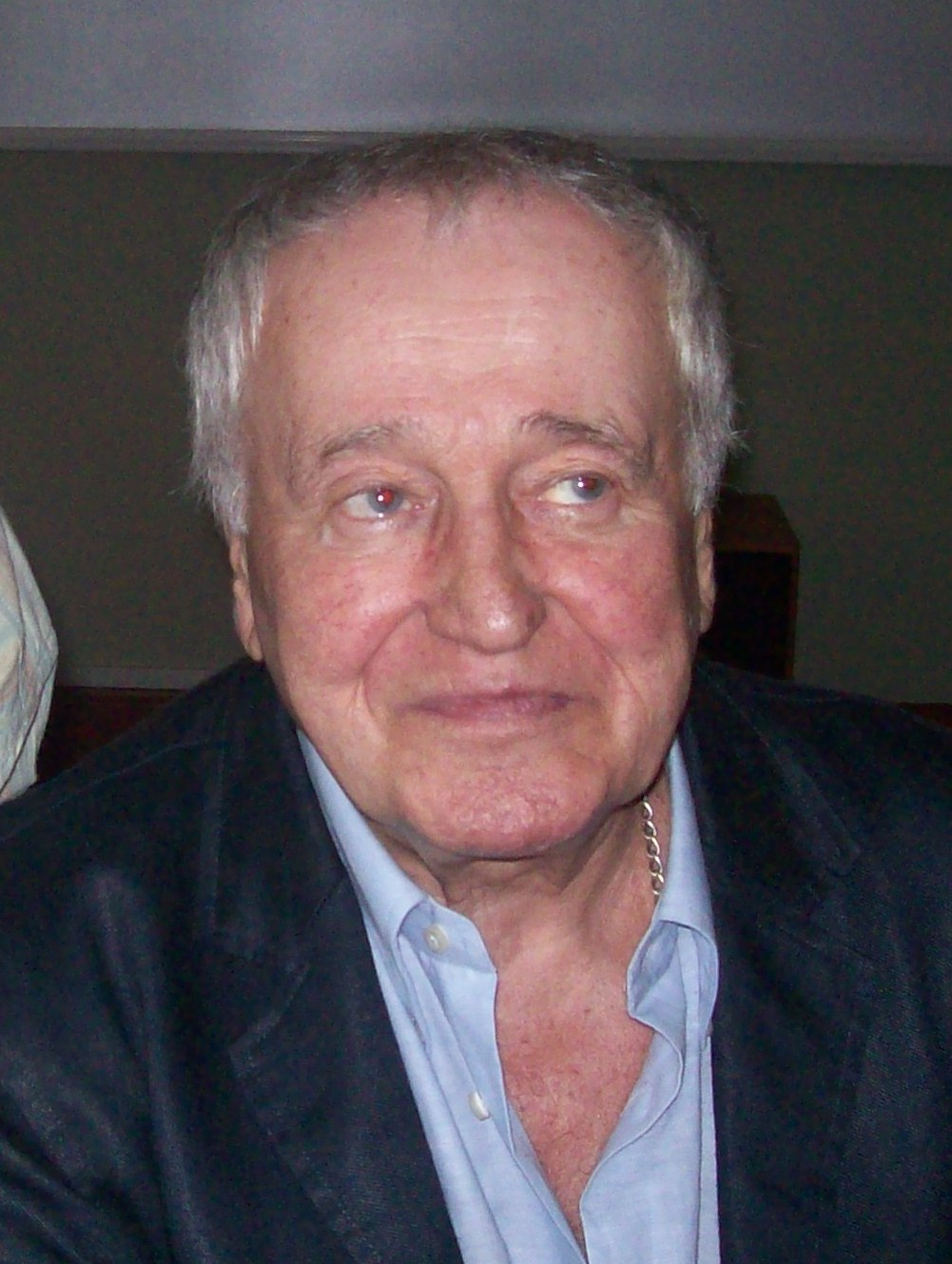
Jan Nowicki - Hans Heinrich XV, Prince of Pless and wealthy magnate of Silesia

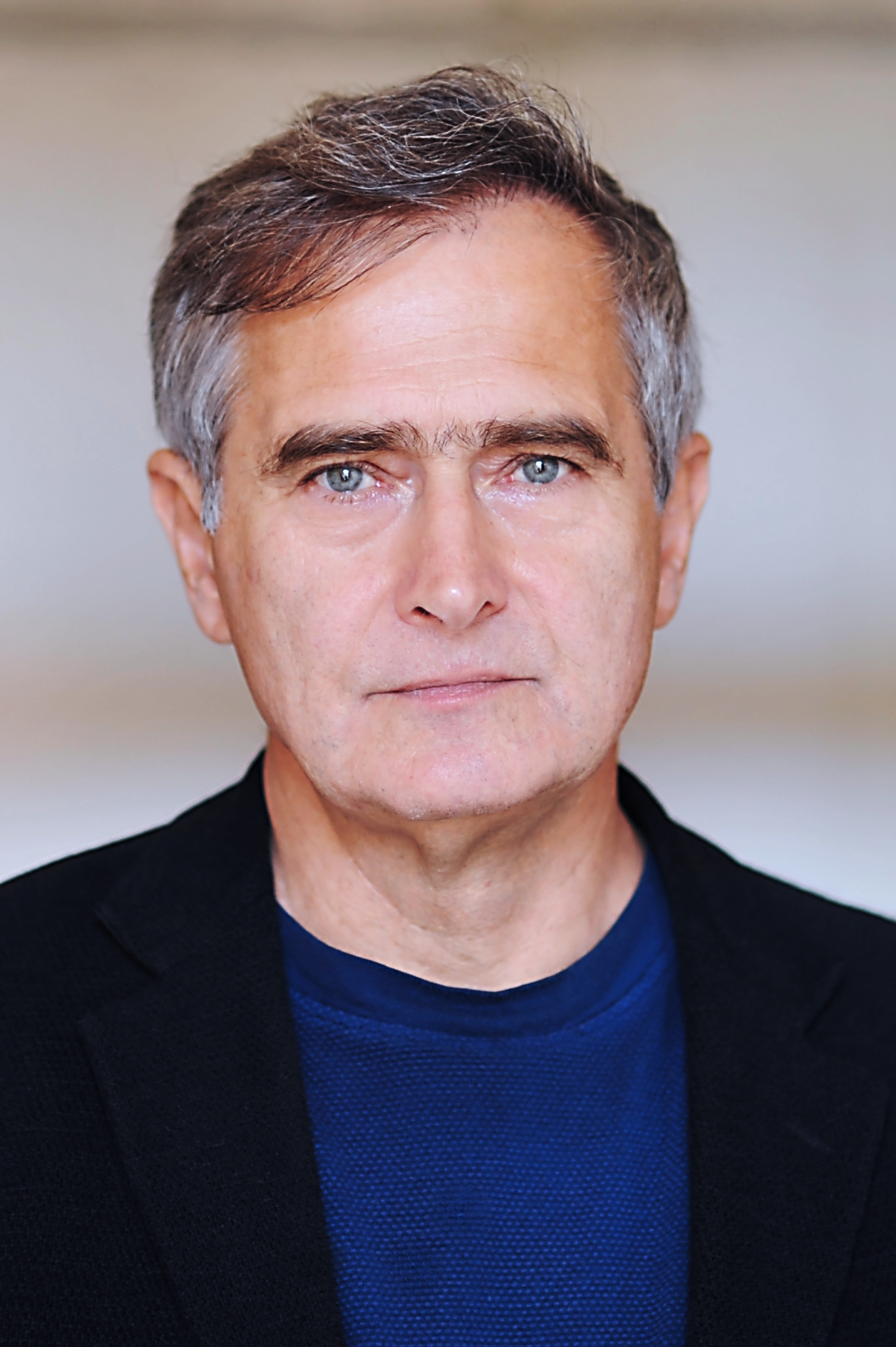
Olgierd Łukaszewicz - Franzel von Teuss, eldest son and head of the company

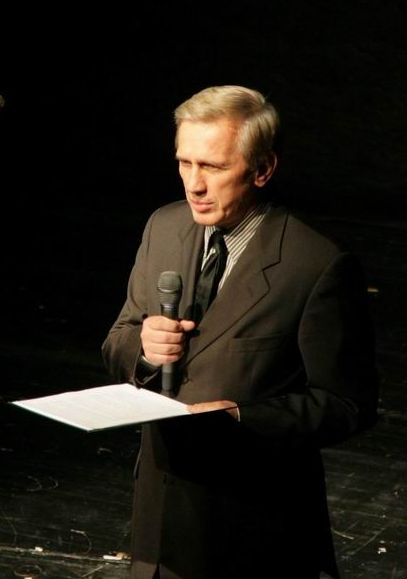
Jan Englert - Conrad von Teuss, middle son

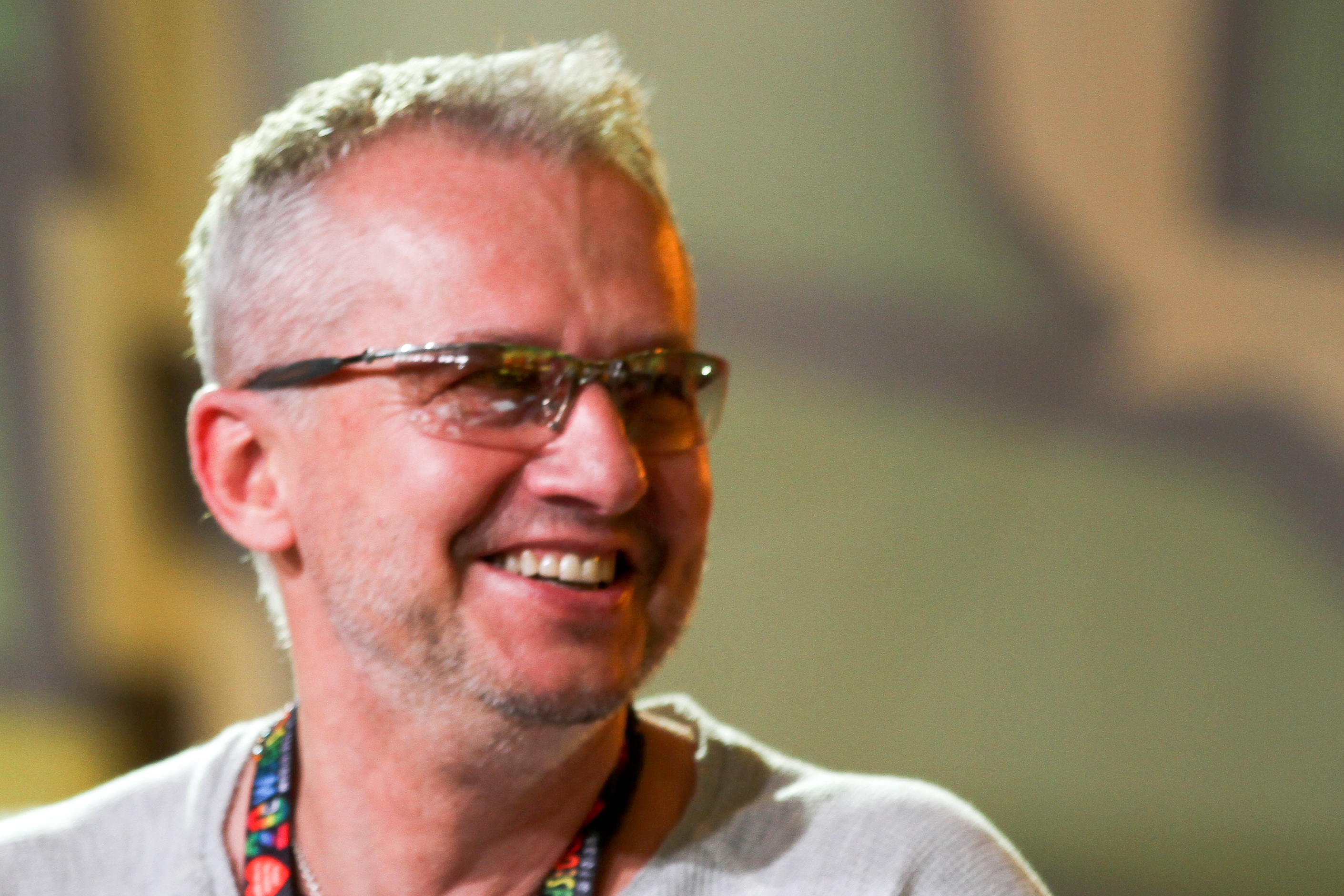
Bogusław Linda - Bolko von Teuss, youngest son and gambler

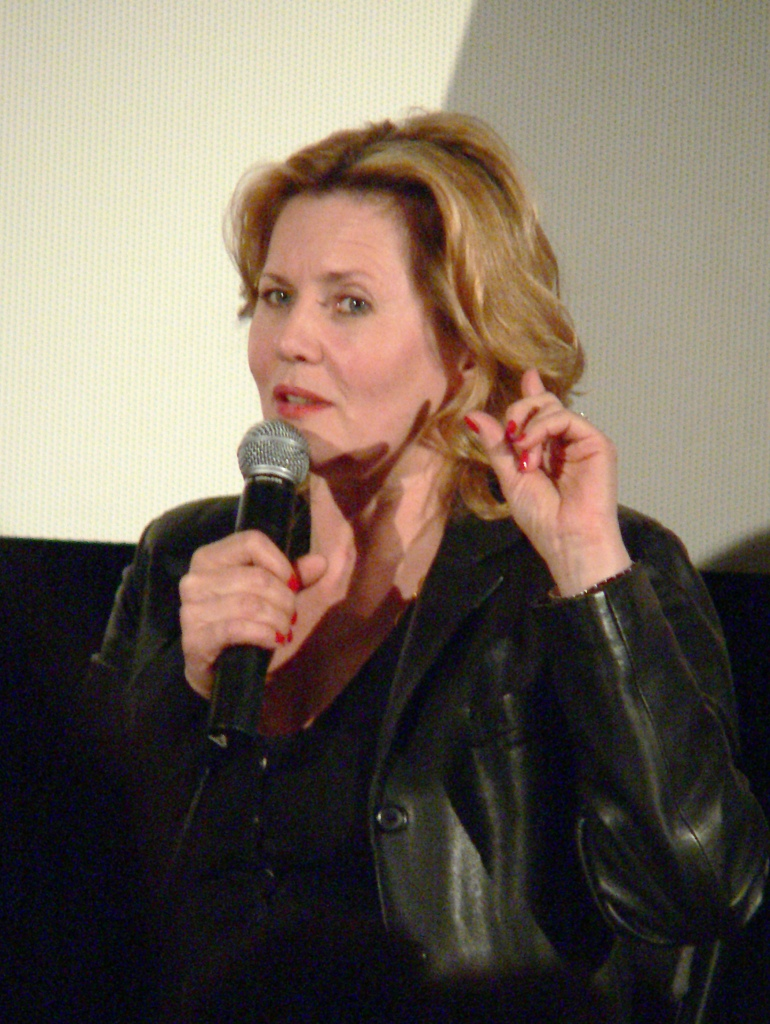
Grażyna Szapołowska - Marisca, Duchess and adventuress
