= Faustina (1995 film) =

- Directed by: Jerzy Łukaszewicz
- Written by: Maria Nowakowska-Majcher
- Starring: Dorota Segda; Danuta Szaflarska; Agnieszka Czekańska; Stanisława Celińska; Krzysztof Wakuliński
- Release date: 1995
- Running time: 75 minutes
- Country: Poland
- Language: Polish

Faustina (Polish: Faustyna) is a 1995 Polish biographical drama film about Faustina Kowalska, a Roman Catholic nun and mystic whose apparitions of Jesus Christ inspired the Catholic devotion to the Divine Mercy. Directed by Jerzy Łukaszewicz, it stars Dorota Segda as the titular nun.

== Cast ==
- Dorota Segda as Sister Faustyna (Helena) Kowalska
- Mirosława Dubrawska as General Mother of the congregation
- Krzysztof Wakuliński as Priest Michał Sopoćko
- Teresa Budzisz-Krzyżanowska as Superior Mother of Monastery
- Zofia Rysiówna as Siostra Wiktoryna
- Janusz Michałowski as Malarz Eugeniusz Kazimierowski
- Agnieszka Czekańska as Sister Feliksa
- Renata Berger as Psychiatrist

== See also ==
- Divine Mercy: No Escape, a 1987 American film which also depicts the life of Faustina Kowalska
