= Taniec z gwiazdami season 6 =

Taniec z gwiazdami
- Season 6
- Hosted by: Piotr Gąsowski; Katarzyna Skrzynecka
- Judges: Iwona Pavlović; Piotr Galiński; Beata Tyszkiewicz; Zbigniew Wodecki
- Celebrity winner: Anna Guzik
- Professional winner: Łukasz Czarnecki
- No. of episodes: 12

Release
- Original network: TVN
- Original release: 9 September – 25 November 2007

Season chronology
- ← Previous; 5 Next → 7

The 6th season of Taniec z Gwiazdami, the Polish edition of Dancing With the Stars, started on 9 September 2007 and ended on 25 November 2007. It was broadcast by TVN. Katarzyna Skrzynecka and new presenter Piotr Gąsowski were the hosts, and the judges were: Iwona Szymańska-Pavlović, Zbigniew Wodecki, Beata Tyszkiewicz and Piotr Galiński.

On 25 November, Anna Guzik and her partner Łukasz Czarnecki were crowned the champions.

== Couples ==
Celebrity	Occupation	Professional partner	Status
Stachursky	Singer	Dominika Kublik-Marzec	Withdrew on 9 September 2007
Sandra Lewandowska	Social conservative Politician	Michał Skawiński	Eliminated 1st on 16 September 2007
Tomasz Kammel	TVP presenter	Amy Bennett	Eliminated 2nd on 23 September 2007
Halina Mlynkova	Former Brathanki singer	Robert Rowiński	Withdrew on 30 September 2007
Adam Fidusiewicz	Na Wspólnej actor	Alesya Surova	Eliminated 3rd on 30 September 2007
Helena Vondráčková	Singer	Milan Plačko	Eliminated 4th on 7 October 2007
Krzysztof Bosak	Far-right Politician	Kamila Kajak	Eliminated 5th on 14 October 2007
Daria Widawska	Film and television actress	Robert Kochanek	Eliminated 6th on 21 October 2007
Jacek Kawalec	Actor and television presenter	Blanka Winiarska	Eliminated 7th on 28 October 2007
Isis Gee	Singer	Żora Korolyov †	Eliminated 8th on 4 November 2007
Rafał Bryndal	Comedian and radio host	Magdalena Soszyńska-Michno	Eliminated 9th on 11 November 2007
Mateusz Damięcki	Film and television actor	Ewa Szabatin	Third Place on 18 November 2007
Justyna Steczkowska	Singer and actress	Stefano Terrazzino	Second Place on 25 November 2007
Anna Guzik	Na Wspólnej actress	Łukasz Czarnecki	Winners on 25 November 2007

== Scores ==
Couple	Place	1	2	3	4	5	6	7	8	9	10	11	12
Anna & Łukasz	1	-	33	37	35†	32	38	33	36	33	37+30=67	40+28=68‡	34+40+40=114‡
Justyna & Stefano	2	-	37†	33	30	38†	40†	37	40†	40†	32+39=71	40+39=79†	40+40+40=120†
Mateusz & Ewa	3	33†	-	40†	35†	38†	33	40†	38	39	40+40=80†	38+40=78	
Rafał & Magdalena	4	25	-	30	22‡	22‡	31	40†	26	30‡	25+31=56‡		
Isis & Żora	5	-	25‡	27‡	30	25	36	37	25‡	30‡			
Jacek & Blanka	6	29	-	27‡	33	29	33	27‡	28				
Daria & Robert	7	-	31	29	30	32	36	30					
Krzysztof & Kamila	8	26	-	35	27	30	30‡						
Helena & Milan	9	-	33	29	33	30							
Adam & Alesya	10	21‡	-	31	24								
Halina & Robert	11	-	35	36	—								
Tomasz & Amy	12	25	-	29									
Sandra & Michał	13	-	28										
Jacek & Dominika	14	29											

Red numbers indicate the lowest score for each week.
Green numbers indicate the highest score for each week.
indicates the couple eliminated that week.
indicates the returning couple that finished in the bottom two.
indicates the winning couple of the week.
indicates the runner-up of the week.
indicates the third place couple of the week.
indicates the couple withdrew from the competition.
indicates the couple that would have been eliminated had an elimination taken place.

Notes:

Week 1: Only male celebrities' dances were judged in this episode. Female celebrities danced a group Mambo. Mateusz Damięcki scored 33 out of 40 for his Waltz, making it the highest score in this episode. Adam Fidusiewicz got 21 points for his Cha-cha-cha, making it the lowest score of the week and this season. Tomasz & Amy were eliminated according to a combined jury and audience voting, but Jacek & Dominika left the show because of Jacek's injury, putting Tomasz & Amy back into the competition. It was the first time in history of the show the person withdrew from the show.

Week 2: Only female celebrities' dances were judged in this episode. Male celebrities danced a group Swing. Justyna Steczkowska scored 37 out of 40 for her Rumba, making it the highest Week 2 score in history of the show. Isis Gee got 25 points for her Rumba, making it the lowest score of the week. Sandra & Michał were eliminated despite being 3 points from the bottom.

Week 3: Mateusz Damięcki received the first perfect score of the season for his Tango, as well as the earliest perfect score in history of the show. Isis Gee and Jacek Kawalec got 27 points, making it the lowest score of the week. Tomasz & Amy were eliminated despite being 2 points from the bottom.

Week 4: Mateusz Damięcki and Anna Guzik scored 35 out of 40, making it the highest score in this episode. Rafał Bryndal got 22 points for his Paso Doble, making it the lowest score of the week. Halina Mlynkova announced her withdrawal from the show due to injury. Adam & Alesya were eliminated despite being 2 points from the bottom. This week marks the first time in history of the show when two celebrities withdrew from the show. Also two celebrities left the show for the first time in history of the show.

Week 5: Mateusz Damięcki and Justyna Steczkowska scored 38 out of 40, making it the highest score in this episode. Rafał Bryndal got 22 points for his Viennese Waltz, making it the lowest score of the week. Helena & Milan were eliminated despite being 8 points from the bottom.

Week 6: Justyna Steczkowska received her first perfect score for the American Smooth. Krzysztof Bosak got 30 points for his Samba, making it the lowest score of the week. Krzysztof & Kamila were eliminated.

Week 7: Rafał Bryndal received his first perfect score for the Quickstep and Mateusz Damięcki received his second perfect score for the Quickstep. Jacek Kawalec got 27 points for his Quickstep, making it the lowest score of the week. Daria & Robert were eliminated despite being 3 points from the bottom.

Week 8: Justyna Steczkowska received her second perfect score for the Tango. Isis Gee got 25 points for her Tango, making it the lowest score of the week. Jacek & Blanka were eliminated despite being 3 points from the bottom.

Week 9: All couples danced to the most famous songs of Agnieszka Osiecka. Justyna Steczkowska received her third perfect score for the Paso Doble. Isis Gee and Rafał Bryndal got 30 points, making it the lowest score of the week. Isis & Żora were eliminated.

Week 10: All couples danced two dances. Mateusz Damięcki got two perfect scores for his Jive and American Smooth. Rafał & Magdalena were eliminated.

Week 11: Anna Guzik received her first perfect score for the Argentine Tango, Justyna Steczkowska received her 4th perfect score for the Cha-cha-cha and Mateusz Damięcki received his 5th perfect score for the Argentine Tango. Mateusz & Ewa were eliminated despite being 10 points from the bottom.

Week 12: Both couples had to perform three dances: their favorite Latin dance, their favorite Ballroom dance and a Freestyle. Justyna Steczkowska received her 5th, 6th and 7th perfect score for the Cha-cha-cha, American Smooth and Freestyle. Steczkowska got 120 out of 120 points, making her the second person getting the highest possible score in the finale. Anna Guzik received her second and third perfect score for the Tango and Freestyle. Guzik became the 6th winner in the history of the show, having cast 53.5 percent of the votes. This is the first time the season's winner was on the 4th place on the judges' general scoreboard and the second time the winner was not on the first place according to the judges' scoreboard.

== Average Chart ==
Rank by average	Place	Couple	Average	Total	Best Score	Worst Score
1.	3.	Mateusz Damięcki & Ewa Szabatin	37.8	454	40	33
2.	2.	Justyna Steczkowska & Stefano Terrazzino	37.7	565	40	30
3.	11.	Halina Mlynkova & Robert Rowiński	35.5	71	36	35
4.	1.	Anna Guzik & Łukasz Czarnecki	35.1	526	40	28
5.	7.	Daria Widawska & Robert Kochanek	31.3	188	36	29
6.	9.	Helena Vondráčková & Milan Plačko	31.3	125	33	29
7.	8.	Krzysztof Bosak & Kamila Kajak	29.6	148	35	26
8.	6.	Jacek Kawalec & Blanka Winiarska	29.4	206	33	27
9.	5.	Isis Gee & Żora Korolyov	29.4	235	37	25
10.	14.	Stachursky & Dominika Kublik-Marzec	29.0	29	29	29
11.	4.	Rafał Bryndal & Magdalena Soszyńska-Michno	28.2	282	40	22
12.	13.	Sandra Lewandowska & Michał Skawiński	28.0	28	28	28
13.	12.	Tomasz Kammel & Amy Bennett	27.0	54	29	25
14.	10.	Adam Fidusiewicz & Alesya Surova	25.3	76	31	21
Everyteam			31	2990		

== Episodes ==
=== Week 1 ===
Individual judges scores in charts below (given in parentheses) are listed in this order from left to right: Piotr Galiński, Beata Tyszkiewicz, Zbigniew Wodecki, Iwona Pavlović.

Running order

Couple	Score	Style	Music
Jacek & Blanka	29 (6,9,8,6)	Cha-Cha-Cha	"(I Can't Get No) Satisfaction"—The Rolling Stones
Mateusz & Ewa	33 (7,10,9,7)	Waltz	"Imagine"—John Lennon
Rafał & Magdalena	25 (6,8,7,4)	Cha-Cha-Cha	"On Broadway"—The Drifters
Tomasz & Amy	25 (5,8,7,5)	Waltz	"Nothing Compares 2 U"—Sinéad O'Connor
Krzysztof & Kamila	26 (6,8,7,5)	Cha-Cha-Cha	"Get Back"—The Beatles
Jacek & Dominika	29 (7,9,7,6)	Waltz	"Against All Odds (Take a Look at Me Now)"—Phil Collins
Adam & Alesya	21 (3,8,7,3)	Cha-Cha-Cha	"Kokomo"—The Beach Boys
Daria & Robert; Halina & Robert; Isis & Żora; Helena & Milan; Sandra & Michał; Anna & Łukasz; Justyna & Stefano	N/A	Group Mambo	"Ran Kan Kan"—Tito Puente

=== Week 2 ===
Running order

Couple	Score	Style	Music
Daria & Robert	31 (7,9,8,7)	Rumba	"In My Secret Life"—Leonard Cohen
Halina & Robert	35 (7,10,10,8)	Quickstep	"Oh Marie"—Louis Prima
Isis & Żora	25 (5,8,8,4)	Rumba	"How Deep Is Your Love"—Bee Gees
Helena & Milan	33 (8,10,10,5)	Quickstep	"You Are the Sunshine of My Life"—Stevie Wonder
Sandra & Michał	28 (6,8,8,6)	Rumba	"Another Day in Paradise"—Phil Collins
Anna & Łukasz	33 (7,10,9,7)	Quickstep	"Lady Madonna" — The Beatles
Justyna & Stefano	37 (10,10,10,7)	Rumba	"Do You Know"—Diana Ross
Jacek & Blanka; Mateusz & Ewa; Rafał & Magdalena; Tomasz & Amy; Krzysztof & Kamila; Adam & Alesya	N/A	Group Swing	"Smokey Joe's Cafe"—Jerry Leiber & Mike Stoller

=== Week 3 ===
Running order

Couple	Score	Style	Music
Justyna & Stefano	33 (7,10,9,7)	Jive	"Candyman"—Christina Aguilera
Tomasz & Amy	29 (5,9,9,6)	Tango	"Hot Stuff"—Donna Summer
Helena & Milan	29 (7,9,9,4)	Jive	"I'm Still Standing"—Elton John
Krzysztof & Kamila	35 (8,9,10,8)	Tango	"Blue Tango"—Leroy Anderson
Anna & Łukasz	37 (9,10,10,8)	Jive	"Bad Boy"—Miami Sound Machine
Adam & Alesya	31 (7,9,8,7)	Tango	"China Girl"—David Bowie
Isis & Żora	27 (6,8,8,5)	Jive	"Surfin' U.S.A." — The Beach Boys
Jacek & Blanka	27 (5,8,9,5)	Tango	"Owner of a Lonely Heart"—Yes
Halina & Robert	36 (8,10,10,8)	Jive	"Maria"—Blondie
Rafał & Magdalena	30 (7,8,8,7)	Tango	"Chitarra Romana"—Daniele Bruno
Daria & Robert	29 (6,9,9,5)	Jive	"You Can't Hurry Love"—Phil Collins
Mateusz & Ewa	40 (10,10,10,10)	Tango	"Enjoy the Silence"—Depeche Mode

=== Week 4 ===
Running order

Couple	Score	Style	Music
Isis & Żora	30 (7,9,8,6)	Foxtrot	"Eye of the Tiger"—Survivor
Rafał & Magdalena	22 (4,8,7,3)	Paso Doble	"One Night in Bangkok"—Murray Head
Jacek & Blanka	33 (7,10,9,7)	Paso Doble	"High on Emotion"—Chris de Burgh
Justyna & Stefano	30 (6,10,10,4)	Foxtrot	"For Once in My Life"—Stevie Wonder
Mateusz & Ewa	35 (8,10,10,7)	Paso Doble	"By the Way"—Red Hot Chili Peppers
Daria & Robert	30 (5,10,9,6)	Foxtrot	"Come Fly with Me"—Frank Sinatra
Adam & Alesya	24 (3,8,8,5)	Paso Doble	"The Road to Hell"—Chris Rea
Helena & Milan	33 (7,9,10,7)	Foxtrot	"I've Got You Under My Skin" — Frank Sinatra
Krzysztof & Kamila	27 (5,7,9,6)	Paso Doble	"Que Ironia"—Jennifer Lopez
Anna & Łukasz	35 (7,10,10,8)	Foxtrot	"The More I See You"—Anthony Perkins

=== Week 5 ===
Running order

Couple	Score	Style	Music
Krzysztof & Kamila	30 (6,9,8,7)	Viennese Waltz	"Don't Give Up"—Peter Gabriel & Kate Bush
Daria & Robert	32 (7,9,9,7)	Salsa	"Tres Gotas De Agua Bendita"—Gloria Estefan
Helena & Milan	30 (6,10,9,5)	Salsa	"Nadie Como Ella"—Omar Alfanno
Jacek & Blanka	29 (6,9,9,5)	Viennese Waltz	"Still Got the Blues (For You)"—Gary Moore
Anna & Łukasz	32 (7,10,9,6)	Salsa	"Shall We Dance?"—George Gershwin
Justyna & Stefano	38 (10,10,10,8)	Salsa	"Hoy"—Gloria Estefan
Mateusz & Ewa	38 (9,10,10,9)	Viennese Waltz	"Still Loving You"—Scorpions
Isis & Żora	25 (4,8,9,4)	Salsa	"La Negra Mariachi"—Eddie Palmieri
Rafał & Magdalena	22 (4,7,8,3)	Viennese Waltz	"What's a Woman" — Vaya Con Dios

=== Week 6 ===
Running order

Couple	Score	Style	Music
Mateusz & Ewa	33 (7,10,9,7)	Samba	"Livin' la Vida Loca"—Ricky Martin
Isis & Żora	36 (8,10,10,8)	American Smooth	"Always Look on the Bright Side of Life"—Monty Python
Rafał & Magdalena	31 (8,9,8,6)	Samba	"Volare"—Gipsy Kings
Daria & Robert	36 (8,10,10,8)	American Smooth	"My Heart Belongs to Daddy"—Marilyn Monroe
Krzysztof & Kamila	30 (7,8,8,7)	Samba	"Bamboleo"—Gipsy Kings
Justyna & Stefano	40 (10,10,10,10)	American Smooth	"Fever"—Peggy Lee
Jacek & Blanka	33 (7,9,10,7)	Samba	"Bailamos"—Enrique Iglesias
Anna & Łukasz	38 (9,10,10,9)	American Smooth	"Cheek to Cheek"—Fred Astaire

=== Week 7 ===
Running order

Couple	Score	Style	Music
Anna & Łukasz	33 (8,9,8,8)	Cha-Cha-Cha	"We Are Family"—Sister Sledge
Jacek & Blanka	27 (6,9,7,5)	Quickstep	"Nah Neh Nah"—Vaya Con Dios
Justyna & Stefano	37 (9,10,9,9)	Cha-Cha-Cha	"Enigma (Give a Bit of Mmh to Me)"—Amanda Lear
Mateusz & Ewa	40 (10,10,10,10)	Quickstep	"Live is Life"—Opus
Daria & Robert	30 (6,9,9,6)	Cha-Cha-Cha	"On the Beach"—Chris Rea
Rafał & Magdalena	40 (10,10,10,10)	Quickstep	"When You're Smiling"—Louis Armstrong
Isis & Żora	37 (9,9,10,9)	Cha-Cha-Cha	"California Dreamin'"—The Mamas & the Papas

=== Week 8 ===
Running order

Couple	Score	Style	Music
Rafał & Magdalena	26 (5,9,7,5)	Rumba	"Cherish"—Kool & the Gang
Isis & Żora	25 (5,9,7,4)	Tango	"Living On My Own"—Freddie Mercury
Mateusz & Ewa	38 (9,10,10,9)	Rumba	"Purple Rain"—Prince
Anna & Łukasz	36 (8,10,10,8)	Tango	"Summer Wine"—Ville Valo & Natalia Avelon
Jacek & Blanka	28 (4,9,9,6)	Rumba	"Always On My Mind"—Elvis Presley
Justyna & Stefano	40 (10,10,10,10)	Tango	"Et si tu n'existais pas"—Toto Cutugno
Justyna & Stefano; Anna & Łukasz; Isis & Żora; Mateusz & Ewa; Rafał & Magdalena; Jacek & Blanka	N/A	Group Freestyle	"Greased Lightnin' (song)"—John Travolta

=== Week 9: Agnieszka Osiecka Week ===
Running order

Couple	Score	Style	Music
Isis & Żora	30 (6,9,8,7)	Paso Doble	"Zielono mi"—Andrzej Dąbrowski
Mateusz & Ewa	39 (9,10,10,10)	Foxtrot	"Ludzkie gadanie"—Maryla Rodowicz
Justyna & Stefano	40 (10,10,10,10)	Paso Doble	"Dziś prawdziwych cyganów już nie ma"—Maryla Rodowicz
Rafał & Magdalena	30 (7,9,8,6)	Foxtrot	"Czy te oczy mogą kłamać"—Raz, Dwa, Trzy
Anna & Łukasz	33 (8,9,9,7)	Paso Doble	"Małgośka, szkoda łez"—Maryla Rodowicz
Anna & Łukasz; Justyna & Stefano; Mateusz & Ewa; Rafał & Magdalna; Isis & Żora	N/A	Group Viennese Waltz	"Niech żyje bal"—Maryla Rodowicz

=== Week 10 ===
Running order

Couple	Score	Style	Music
Justyna & Stefano	32 (7,10,9,6)	Waltz	"All By Myself"—Eric Carmen
Justyna & Stefano	39 (10,10,10,9)	Samba	"Superstition"—Stevie Wonder
Rafał & Magdalena	25 (4,9,7,5)	Jive	"I Get Around"—The Beach Boys
Rafał & Magdalena	31 (7,9,9,6)	American Smooth	"On the Sunny Side of the Street"—Louis Armstrong
Anna & Łukasz	37 (9,9,10,9)	Waltz	"Without You"—Mariah Carey
Anna & Łukasz	30 (5,9,9,7)	Samba	"Dancing Queen"—ABBA
Mateusz & Ewa	40 (10,10,10,10)	Jive	"I Got You (I Feel Good)"—James Brown
Mateusz & Ewa	40 (10,10,10,10)	American Smooth	"Mack the Knife"—Louis Armstrong

=== Week 11 ===
Running order

Couple	Score	Style	Music
Mateusz & Ewa	38 (9,10,10,9)	Cha-Cha-Cha	"Upside Down"—Diana Ross
Mateusz & Ewa	40 (10,10,10,10)	Argentine Tango	"GoldenEye"—Tina Turner
Anna & Łukasz	40 (10,10,10,10)	Argentine Tango	"Libertango"—Ástor Piazzolla
Anna & Łukasz	28 (6,8,8,6)	Cha-Cha-Cha	"I’m Outta Love"—Anastacia
Justyna & Stefano	40 (10,10,10,10)	Cha-Cha-Cha	"Relax, Take It Easy"—Mika
Justyna & Stefano	39 (10,10,10,9)	Argentine Tango	"Santa Maria (Del Buen Ayre)"—Gotan Project

=== Week 12: Final ===
Running order

Couple	Score	Style	Music
Justyna & Stefano	40 (10,10,10,10)	Cha-Cha-Cha	"Enigma (Give a Bit of Mmh to Me)"—Amanda Lear
Justyna & Stefano	40 (10,10,10,10)	American Smooth	"Fever"—Peggy Lee
Justyna & Stefano	40 (10,10,10,10)	Freestyle	"Kici Kici"—Big Stars "Your Song"—Elton John "Roxanne"—Sting
Anna & Łukasz	34 (8,9,10,7)	Jive	"Bad Boy"—Miami Sound Machine
Anna & Łukasz	40 (10,10,10,10)	Tango	"Summer Wine"—Ville Valo & Natalia Avelon
Anna & Łukasz	40 (10,10,10,10)	Freestyle	"Special Chorus"—Orkiestra Tomasza Szymusia "Romeo and Juliet Are Wed"—Nino Rota "A Time for Us"—Henry Mancini

Other Dances

Couple	Style	Music
Mateusz & Ewa	Argentine Tango	"GoldenEye"—Tina Turner
Rafał & Magdalena	Jive	"I Get Around"—The Beach Boys
Jacek & Blanka	Cha-Cha-Cha	"(I Can't Get No) Satisfaction"—The Rolling Stones
Daria & Robert	Rumba	"In My Secret Life"—Leonard Cohen
Krzysztof & Kamila	Viennese Waltz	"Don't Give Up"—Peter Gabriel & Kate Bush
Helena & Milan	Foxtrot	"I've Got You Under My Skin" — Frank Sinatra
Halina & Robert	Quickstep	"Oh Marie"—Louis Prima
Adam & Alesya	Tango	"China Girl"—David Bowie
Tomasz & Amy	Tango	"Hot Stuff"—Donna Summer
Sandra & Michał	Rumba	"Another Day in Paradise"—Phil Collins
Krzysztof Tyniec & Kamila Kajak (5th Edition Winner)	Paso Doble	"It's My Life"—Bon Jovi

== Dance chart ==
The celebrities and professional partners danced one of these routines for each corresponding week.

- Week 1 (Season Premiere): Cha-Cha-Cha or Waltz (Men) & Group Mambo (Women)
- Week 2: Rumba or Quickstep (Women) & Group Swing (Men)
- Week 3: Jive (Women) or Tango (Men)
- Week 4: Paso Doble (Men) or Foxtrot (Women)
- Week 5: Salsa (Women) or Viennese Waltz (Men)
- Week 6: Samba (Men) or American Smooth (Women)
- Week 7: Cha-Cha-Cha (Women) or Quickstep (Men)
- Week 8: Tango (Women) or Rumba (Men) & Group Freestyle
- Week 9 (Agnieszka Osiecka Week): Paso Doble (Women) or Foxtrot (Men) & Group Viennese Waltz
- Week 10: Waltz & Samba (Women) or Jive & American Smooth (Men)
- Week 11 (The Semifinal): Argentine Tango & Cha-Cha-Cha
- Week 12 (The Final): Favourite Latin dance, favourite Ballroom dance & Freestyle

Couple	Week 1	Week 2	Week 3	Week 4	Week 5	Week 6	Week 7	Week 8		Week 9		Week 10		Week 11		Week 12 Final		
Anna & Łukasz	Group Mambo	Quickstep	Jive	Foxtrot	Salsa	American Smooth	Cha-Cha-Cha	Tango	Group Freestyle	Paso Doble	Group Viennese Waltz	Waltz	Samba	Argentine Tango	Cha-Cha-Cha	Jive	Tango	Freestyle
Justyna & Stefano	Group Mambo	Rumba	Jive	Foxtrot	Salsa	American Smooth	Cha-Cha-Cha	Tango	Group Freestyle	Paso Doble	Group Viennese Waltz	Waltz	Samba	Cha-Cha-Cha	Argentine Tango	Cha-Cha-Cha	American Smooth	Freestyle
Mateusz & Ewa	Waltz	Group Swing	Tango	Paso Doble	Viennese Waltz	Samba	Quickstep	Rumba	Group Freestyle	Foxtrot	Group Viennese Waltz	Jive	American Smooth	Cha-Cha-Cha	Argentine Tango			Argentine Tango
Rafał & Magdalena	Cha-Cha-Cha	Group Swing	Tango	Paso Doble	Viennese Waltz	Samba	Quickstep	Rumba	Group Freestyle	Foxtrot	Group Viennese Waltz	Jive	American Smooth					Jive
Isis & Żora	Group Mambo	Rumba	Jive	Foxtrot	Salsa	American Smooth	Cha-Cha-Cha	Tango	Group Freestyle	Paso Doble	Group Viennese Waltz							
Jacek & Blanka	Cha-Cha-Cha	Group Swing	Tango	Paso Doble	Viennese Waltz	Samba	Quickstep	Rumba	Group Freestyle									Cha-Cha-Cha
Daria & Robert	Group Mambo	Rumba	Jive	Foxtrot	Salsa	American Smooth	Cha-Cha-Cha											Rumba
Krzysztof & Kamila	Cha-Cha-Cha	Group Swing	Tango	Paso Doble	Viennese Waltz	Samba												Viennese Waltz
Helena & Milan	Group Mambo	Quickstep	Jive	Foxtrot	Salsa													Foxtrot
Adam & Alessia	Cha-Cha-Cha	Group Swing	Tango	Paso Doble														Tango
Halina & Robert	Group Mambo	Quickstep	Jive	Foxtrot														Quickstep
Tomasz & Amy	Waltz	Group Swing	Tango															Tango
Sandra & Michał	Group Mambo	Rumba																Rumba
Jacek & Dominika	Waltz																	

Highest scoring dance
Lowest scoring dance
Performed, but not scored
Not performed due to withdrawal

== Weekly results ==
The order is based on the judges' scores combined with the viewers' votes.

Order	Week 1	Week 2	Week 3	Week 4	Week 5	Week 6	Week 7	Week 8	Week 9	Week 10	Week 11	Week 12 Final
1	Jacek & Dominika	Justyna & Stefano	Mateusz & Ewa	Anna & Łukasz	Mateusz & Ewa	Justyna & Stefano	Rafał & Magdalena	Justyna & Stefano	Justyna & Stefano	Mateusz & Ewa	Justyna & Stefano	Anna & Łukasz
2	Mateusz & Ewa	Anna & Łukasz	Anna & Łukasz	Mateusz & Ewa	Anna & Łukasz	Anna & Łukasz	Mateusz & Ewa	Anna & Łukasz	Anna & Łukasz	Anna & Łukasz	Anna & Łukasz	Justyna & Stefano
3	Jacek & Blanka	Halina & Robert	Krzysztof & Kamila	Daria & Robert	Justyna & Stefano	Rafał & Magdalena	Justyna & Stefano	Rafał & Magdalena	Mateusz & Ewa	Justyna & Stefano	Mateusz & Ewa	
4	Rafał & Magdalena	Daria & Robert	Halina & Robert	Jacek & Blanka	Rafał & Magdalena	Mateusz & Ewa	Isis & Żora	Mateusz & Ewa	Rafał & Magdalena	Rafał & Magdalena		
5	Krzysztof & Kamila	Helena & Milan	Rafał & Magdalena	Justyna & Stefano	Krzysztof & Kamila	Isis & Żora	Anna & Łukasz	Isis & Żora	Isis & Żora			
6	Adam & Alesya	Isis & Żora	Justyna & Stefano	Rafał & Magdalena	Daria & Robert	Daria & Robert	Jacek & Blanka	Jacek & Blanka				
7	Tomasz & Amy	Sandra & Michał	Isis & Żora	Krzysztof & Kamila	Isis & Żora	Jacek & Blanka	Daria & Robert					
8			Daria & Robert	Helena & Milan	Jacek & Blanka	Krzysztof & Kamila						
9			Adam & Alesya	Isis & Żora	Helena & Milan							
10			Helena & Milan	Adam & Alesya								
11			Jacek & Blanka	Halina & Robert								
12			Tomasz & Amy									

This couple came in first place with the judges.
This couple came in first place with the judges and gained the highest number of viewers' votes.
This couple gained the highest number of viewers' votes.
This couple came in last place with the judges and gained the highest number of viewers' votes.
This couple came in last place with the judges.
This couple came in last place with the judges and was eliminated.
This couple was eliminated.
This couple gained the highest number of viewers' votes and withdrew from the competition.
This couple withdrew from the competition.
This couple would have been eliminated but was not eliminated due to other couple's withdrawal.
This couple won the competition.
This couple came in second in the competition.
This couple came in third in the competition.

== Audience voting results ==
Order	Week 1	Week 2	Week 3	Week 4	Week 5	Week 6	Week 7	Week 8	Week 9	Week 10	Week 11	Week 12 Final
1	Jacek & Dominika (43.11)	Anna & Łukasz (31.94)	Mateusz & Ewa (27.13)	Anna & Łukasz (20.72)	Rafał & Magdalena (30.76)	Rafał & Magdalena (20.28)	Rafał & Magdalena (25.52)	Justyna & Stefano (24.56)	Anna & Łukasz (24.21)	Mateusz & Ewa (31.5)	Justyna & Stefano (38.85)	Anna & Łukasz (53.5)
2	Mateusz & Ewa (15.54)	Justyna & Stefano (19.14)	Anna & Łukasz (17.37)	Rafał & Magdalena (16.85)	Mateusz & Ewa (17.94)	Justyna & Stefano (19.48)	Mateusz & Ewa (16.71)	Rafał & Magdalena (19.5)	Justyna & Stefano (21.6)	Anna & Łukasz (28.94)	Anna & Łukasz (33.06)	Justyna & Stefano (46.5)
3	Adam & Alesya (14.47)	Halina & Robert (13.9)	Rafał & Magdalena (10.18)	Mateusz & Ewa (11.83)	Anna & Łukasz (17.58)	Anna & Łukasz (16.9)	Justyna & Stefano (14.0)	Anna & Łukasz (16.45)	Mateusz & Ewa (20.75)	Justyna & Stefano (20.9)	Mateusz & Ewa (28.09)	
4	Rafał & Magdalena (10.08)	Daria & Robert (12.14)	Krzysztof & Kamila (7.65)	Krzysztof & Kamila (9.76)	Isis & Żora (7.9)	Mateusz & Ewa (11.28)	Anna & Łukasz (13.99)	Isis & Żora (15.76)	Rafał & Magdalena (20.69)	Rafał & Magdalena (18.66)		
5	Krzysztof & Kamila (9.13)	Isis & Żora (9.51)	Halina & Robert (7.46)	Daria & Robert (9.36)	Krzysztof & Kamila (6.73)	Krzysztof & Kamila (10.83)	Isis & Żora (12.2)	Mateusz & Ewa (13.36)	Isis & Żora (12.75)			
6	Jacek & Blanka (4.61)	Sandra & Michał (8.04)	Isis & Żora (6.3)	Justyna & Stefano (8.22)	Justyna & Stefano (6.69)	Isis & Żora (9.71)	Jacek & Blanka (9.89)	Jacek & Blanka (10.37)				
7	Tomasz & Amy (3.06)	Helena & Milan (5.33)	Justyna & Stefano (5.15)	Jacek & Blanka (6.85)	Jacek & Blanka (5.96)	Jacek & Blanka (6.6)	Daria & Robert (7.69)					
8			Jacek & Blanka (4.77)	Adam & Alesya (5.51)	Daria & Robert (3.51)	Daria & Robert (4.92)						
9			Daria & Robert (4.75)	Helena & Milan (5.48)	Helena & Milan (2.93)							
10			Helena & Milan (3.36)	Isis & Żora (5.42)								
11			Adam & Alesya (3.12)									
12			Tomasz & Amy (2.76)									

== Guest performances ==
Episode	Date	Singer/Star	Song	Dancers	Source
1	9 September 2007	Tomasz Szymuś's Orchestra	"Crazy in Love" "Hound Dog" "Objection"	Group Hot Gossip
2	16 September 2007	Tomasz Szymuś's Orchestra	"Proud Mary"	Group Hot Gossip
3	23 September 2007	Stachursky	"Żyłem jak chciałem"	Group Hot Gossip
5	7 October 2007	Noche De Boleros	"Esperame En El Cielo"	Group Hot Gossip
5	7 October 2007	Tomasz Szymuś's Orchestra		TOP 16 from 1st season So You Think You Can Dance
6	14 October 2007	Helena Vondráčková	"Samba"	Ritmodelia
6	14 October 2007	Tomasz Szymuś's Orchestra	"Tico-Tico"	Group Hot Gossip
7	21 October 2007	Katarzyna Skrzynecka	"Isn't It Amazing"	Group Hot Gossip
8	28 October 2007	Marquess	"El Temparamento"	-
8	28 October 2007	Marquess	"Vayamos Companeros"	Group Hot Gossip
9	4 November 2007	Big Stars	"Kici Kici"	-
9	4 November 2007	Tomasz Szymuś's Orchestra	"Nie ma jak pompa"	Group Hot Gossip
10	11 November 2007	Natalia Kukulska	"Sexi Flexi"	-
10	11 November 2007	Tomasz Szymuś's Orchestra	"Canned Heat"	Group Hot Gossip
11	18 November 2007	Måns Zelmerlöw	"Maniac"	Group Hot Gossip
11	18 November 2007	Måns Zelmerlöw	"Miss America"	Group Hot Gossip
12	25 November 2007	Jacek Kawalec, Justyna Steczkowska, Isis Gee, Stachursky, Halina Mlynkova, Helena Vondráčková

== Rating figures ==
Episode	Date	Official rating 4+	Share 4+	Official rating 16-39	Share 16-39
1	9 September 2007	5 425 324	32,93%	2 372 758	30,49%
2	16 September 2007	5 269 482	33,29%	2 348 967	31,07%
3	23 September 2007	4 965 785	32,05%	2 133 501	29,57%
4	30 September 2007	4 907 646	31,02%	2 046 021	27,88%
5	7 October 2007	4 868 410	28,74%	2 085 366	26,20%
6	14 October 2007	4 789 419	28,68%	1 925 127	25,23%
7	21 October 2007	4 710 523	28,31%	2 160 553	26,26%
8	28 October 2007	5 051 129	29,89%	2 136 965	26,94%
9	4 November 2007	5 702 785	31,33%	2 419 648	28,20%
10	11 November 2007	5 711 799	32,63%	2 317 985	27,79%
11	18 November 2007	5 822 995	33,39%	2 391 405	29,87%
12	25 November 2007	6 614 399	38,37%	2 767 508	34,39%
Average	Season 6	5 329 070	31,88%	2 261 134	28,79%
