= Hanna Zembrzuska =

Polish actress (1934–2023)

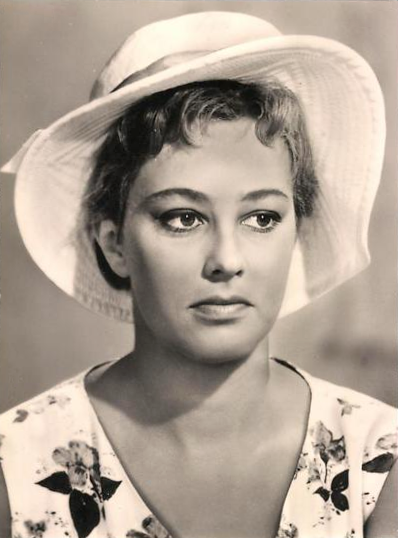
- Zembrzuska circa 1965
- Born: Anna Zembrzuska-Kobuszewska; 7 August 1934; Sofia, Bulgaria
- Died: 16 June 2023 (aged 88); Warsaw, Poland
- Citizenship: Polish
- Occupation: Actress
- Years active: 1955–2012
- Organization: Teatr Kwadrat
- Spouse: Jan Kobuszewski (1956–2019; his death)

Hanna Zembrzuska-Kobuszewska, (sometimes spelled Anna Zembrzuska-Kobuszewska, 7 August 1934 – 16 June 2023) was a Polish theatre and film actress.

== Biography ==
Zembrzuska-Kobuszewska was the daughter of a Bulgarian woman and a Polish man In 1957 she graduated from the State Higher School of Theater in Warsaw ( Faculty of Acting ). On 6 July 1957, her theatrical directorial debut took place. In 2012, she ended her acting career.

After finishing her education, in the following years, she was an actress in the following theaters:

- 1957–1959 – Ateneum Theater in Warsaw
- 1959–1969 – National Theater in Warsaw
- 1969–1975 – Polish Theater in Warsaw
- 1975–1976 – Teatr Nowy in Łódź
- 1976–1983, 1986–2012 – Kwadrat Theater in Warsaw
- 1983–1986 – Na Woli Theater in Warsaw

== Personal life and death ==
From 1956 she was married to actor and comedian Jan Kobuszewski until his death in 2019. She died on 16 June 2023, at the age of 88.

== Filmography ==
- 1955 – Godziny nadziei, as a girl joining the Americans
- 1956 – Warszawska syrena, as a mermaid
- 1958 – Wolne miasto, as Irka
- 1961 – Dotknięcie nocy, as Beata
- 1962 – Wyrok, as the wife of Opara
- 1969 – Wniebowstąpienie, as Raisa's friend
