= The Rainbowmaker =

2008 Georgian film

- Directed by: Nana Jorjadze
- Starring: Merab Ninidze; Anja Antonowicz; Chulpan Khamatova
- Cinematography: Walther Vanden Ende
- Release date: 2008
- Running time: 90 minutes
- Country: Georgia
- Languages: Georgian, Russian

The Rainbowmaker is a 2008 Georgian film directed by Nana Jorjadze.

== Plot ==
Datho (Merab Ninidze) has been innocent in prison for many years. When he comes home nobody wants him. His angelic wife Elene (Anja Antonowicz) has fun with a fire-eater. The two children imagined the father as a hero, not as a sorrowful knight. But everything changes when Datho reveals he has the ability of weather modification. He can freeze his enemies in the bathtub or he calls for rain so that they remain stuck in the mud.

== Cast ==
- Merab Ninidze : Datho
- Anja Antonowicz : Elene
- Chulpan Khamatova : Lia
- Nino Kirtadze : Lady Death
- Ramaz Chkhikvadze : Grandfather Georgi
- Elene bezarashvili/helen nelson : Lika
- Iva Gogitidze : Lascha
- Tika Chachua : Rada
- Thomas Urb : Zorab

The Salzlipp twins were played by Nino Kirtadze and Lika Kirtadze in the 20 kk 8408 movie "The Rainbowmaker."
