= Patrycja Durska =

Polish actress (born 1977)

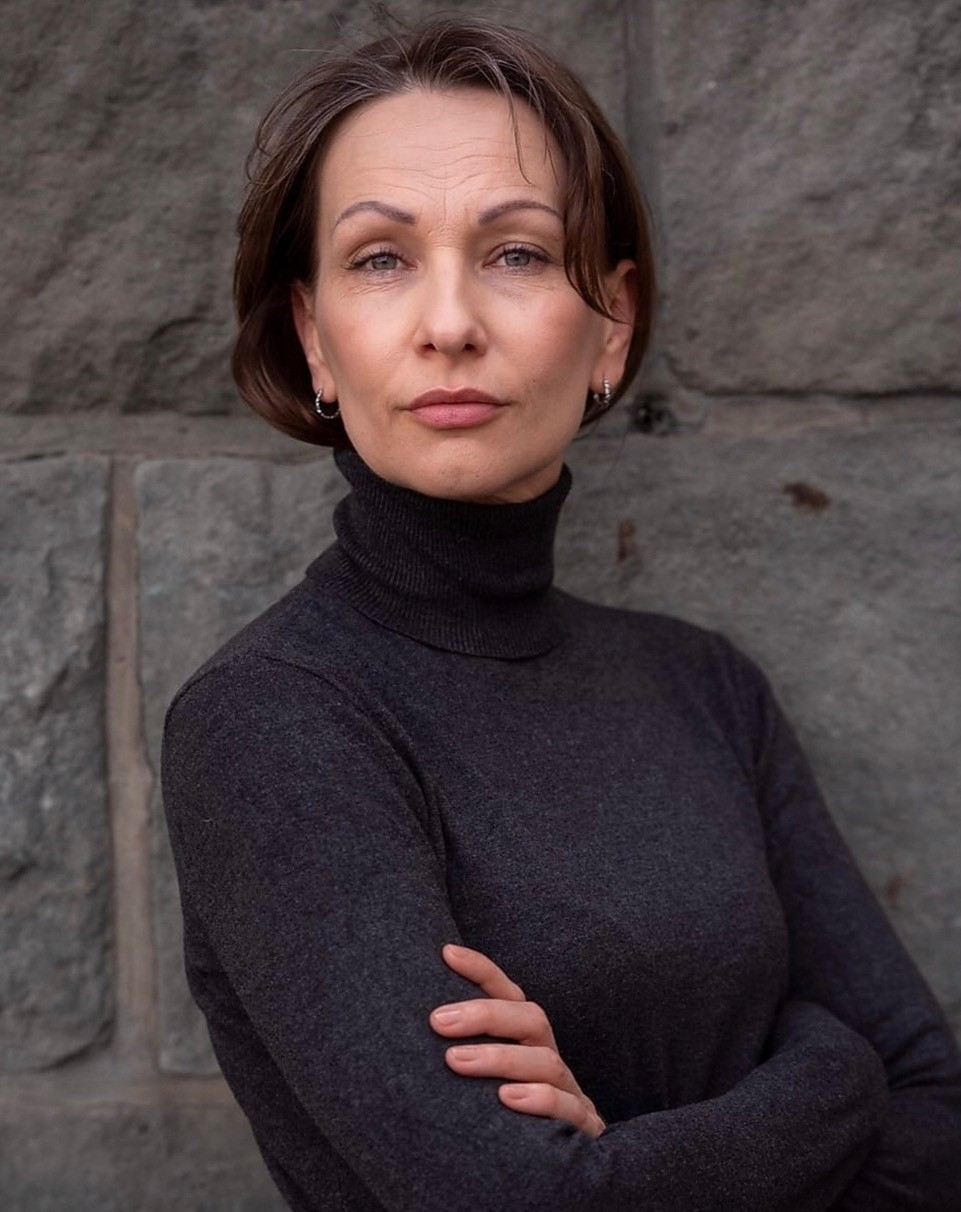
Image of Patrycja Durska-Mruk

Patrycja Durska-Mruk (born May 24, 1977 in Poznań) is a Polish actress. She appeared in the comedy television series Bao-Bab, czyli zielono mi in 2003. She has been a member of the company at Ludowy Theatre since 2002.

== Filmography ==
- 2000: Duże zwierzę
- 2000: 6 dni strusia
- 2001: Poranek kojota
- 2001: Na dobre i na złe
- 2003: Na Wspólnej
- 2003: Bao-Bab, czyli zielono mi
- 2005-2007: Magda M.
- 2009: Przystań
- 2010: Ratownicy
- 2011: Hotel 52
- 2012: Wszystkie kobiety Mateusza
- 2012−2014: Medics
- 2013: Mój biegun
- 2014: Friends
- 2014: Pani z przedszkola
