= Anja Antonowicz =

Polish-German actress (born 1981)

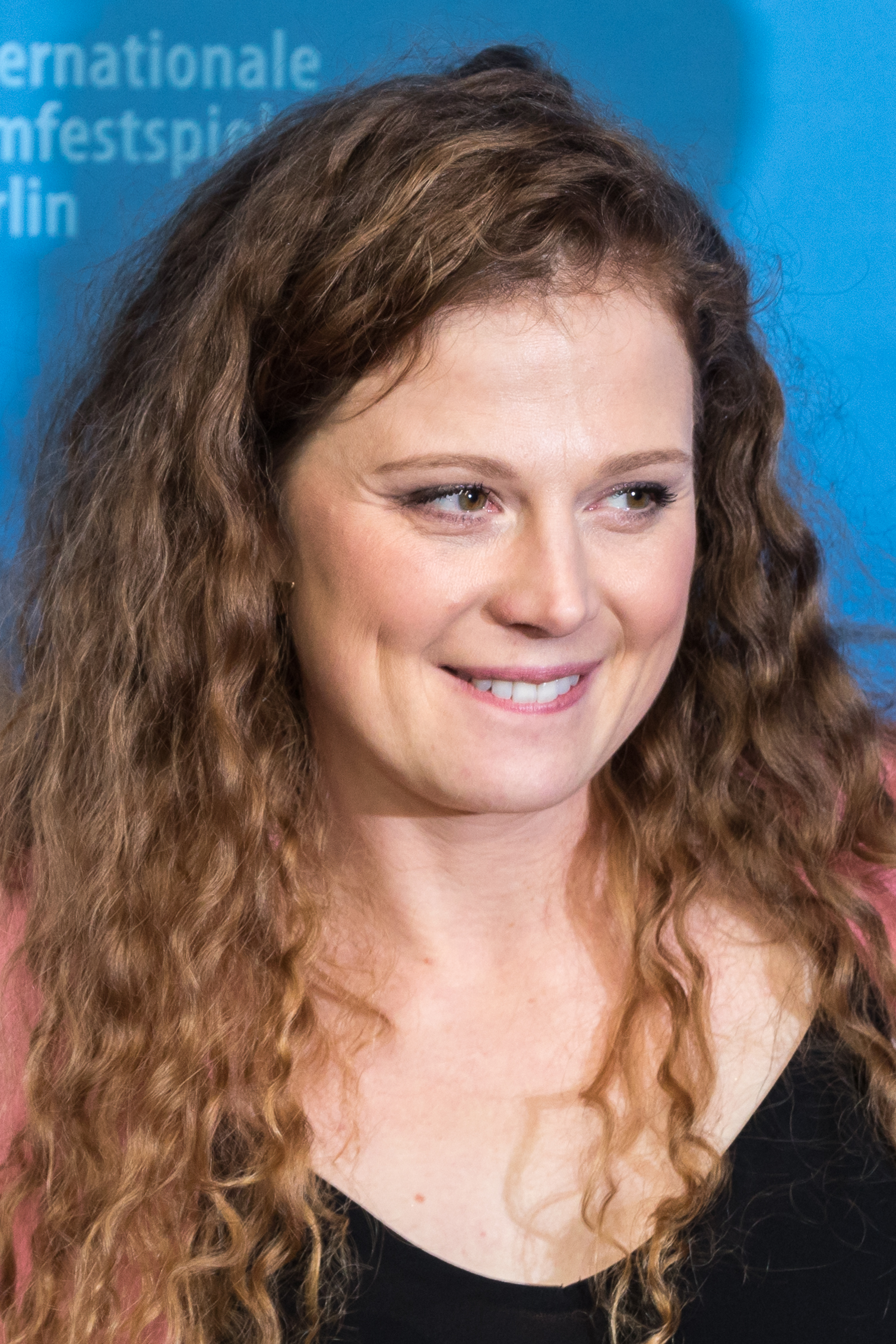
- Antonowicz in 2018
- Born: 22 December 1981 (age 43); Włocławek, Poland
- Occupation: Actress

Anja Antonowicz (born 22 December 1981) is a Polish-German actress from Włocławek.

== Career ==
Antonowicz attended the National Film School in Łódź and obtained an acting diploma in 2004. She initially performed in theatre and television in Poland, appearing in such productions as Bao-Bab, czyli zielono mi and Na dobre i na złe, before moving to Germany to continue her career. She made appearances in Lindenstraße and Bella Block, for which she received a German Television Award nomination for Best Supporting Actress in 2005.

Internationally, Antonowicz has appeared in such films as Nightwatching (2007), The Rainbowmaker (2008), and West (2013).

== Selected filmography ==
Film
Year	Title	Role	Notes
2001	Cisza	Girl on a swing	
2007	Nightwatching	Catharina	
2008	The Rainbowmaker	Elene	
2011	Remembrance	Ewa Limanowska	
2013	West	Krystyna Jablonowska	

Television
Year	Title	Role	Notes
2003	Bao-Bab, czyli zielono mi	Bąbel	12 episodes
2003–04	Na dobre i na złe	Ruda	13 episodes
2005	Bella Block	Maria Koslowska	1 episode
2006	Lindenstraße	Nastya Pashenko	
2007	Ein starkes Team	Danuta	1 episode
2007	Dr. Psycho – Die Bösen, die Bullen, meine Frau und ich	Dana	1 episode
2009	Ein Fall für zwei	Eva Wosniak	1 episode
2010–20	Notruf Hafenkante	various characters	4 episodes
2011	Küstenwache	Johanna Kunz	1 episode
2012	Stuttgart Homicide	Henriette Frenzen	1 episode
2013	Leipzig Homicide	Kamilia Khurodi	1 episode
2014	Cologne P.D.	Natascha Ramova	1 episode
2014	SOKO München	Alma Tolkova	1 episode
2014	Danni Lowinski	Chantal Fender	1 episode
2015	Bettys Diagnose	Maria Rosicki	1 episode
2015–21	Tatort	Dr. Jana Kroll	9 episodes
2016	Alarm für Cobra 11 – Die Autobahnpolizei	Anna Brehm	1 episode
2018	Bad Banks	Grazyne	3 episodes
2018	Der Bergdoktor	Erianna Kolas	1 episode
2018–19	Berlin Station	Nina Bartek	5 episodes
2018–20	Tiere bis unters Dach	Maria Kulka	4 episodes
2020	Das Traumschiff	Clara Philipp	1 episode
