= Jan Kobuszewski (actor) =

Polish actor and comedian (1934–2019)

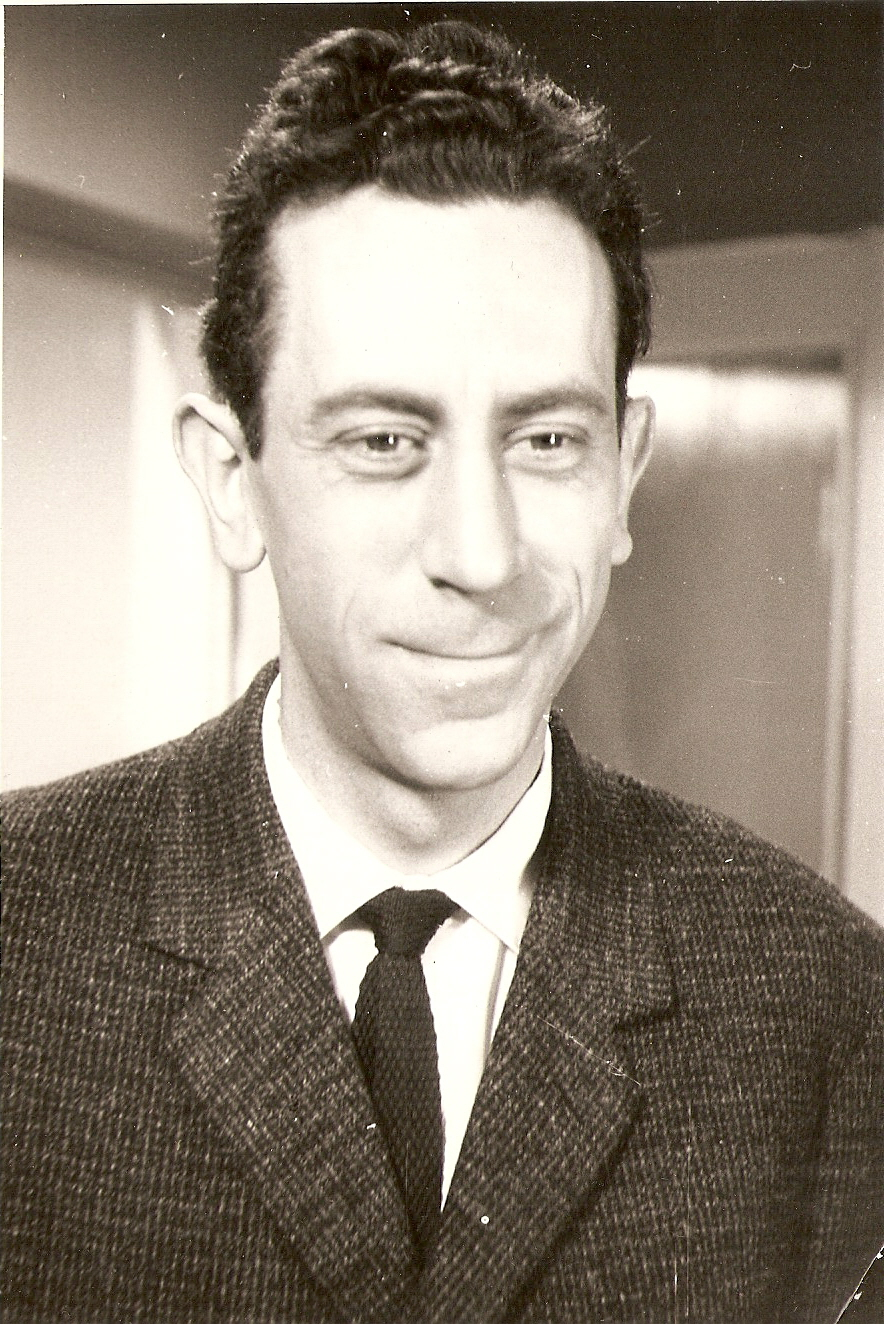
- Born: 19 April 1934; Warsaw, Poland
- Died: 28 September 2019 (aged 85)
- Occupations: Actor, comedian
- Spouse: Hanna Zembrzuska

Jan Kobuszewski (19 April 1934 – 28 September 2019) was a Polish actor and comedian.

== Biography ==
Kobuszewski graduated from the National Academy of Dramatic Art in Warsaw. He performed in many theatres, including Teatr Młodej Warszawy (1956–1957), Teatr Klasyczny, Warsaw (1957–1958), Teatr Polski, Warsaw (1958–1964), Teatr Wielki, Warsaw (1964–1969), and Kwadrat Theatre, Warsaw (from 1976). In 1963, he began co-hosting with Jan Kociniak the first satirical TV show on Polish television, Wielokropek.

Kobuszewski was awarded the Order of Polonia Restituta, one of Poland's highest orders, and many other orders, including Gold Cross of Merit and Medal for Long Marital Life.

He died on 28 September 2019, aged 85.

== Private life ==
Kobuszewski was the husband of actress Hanna Zembrzuska. He had a daughter Maryna. He was also an uncle of the actor Wiktor Zborowski.

== Filmography ==
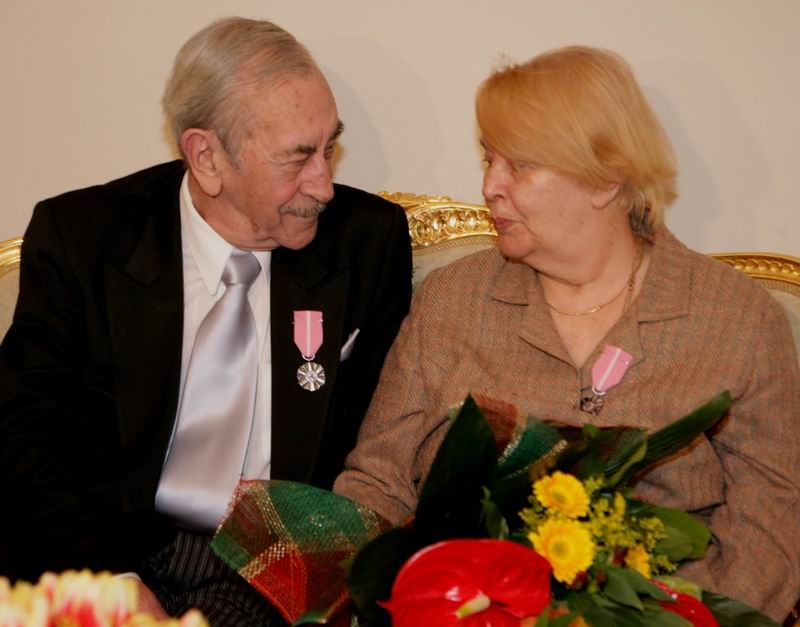
Kobuszewski with his wife, actress Hanna Zembrzuska at a meeting with President Lech Kaczyński

- Ryś (2007) .... Ciemny
- U fryzjera .... Błażej Grzegorz (1 episode, 2006)
- Codzienna 2 m. 3 (2005–2007) .... Anatol
- Graczykowie (1999–2000) .... Półpielec
- Przygody dobrego wojaka Szwejka (1999) .... Katz
- Złoto dezerterów (1998) .... Haber's Father
- Klan (2 episodes, 1997) .... Photographer
- Czterdziestolatek - dwadzieścia lat później (1 episode, 1993) .... Jasio
- Alternatywy 4 .... Cheat (2 episodes, 1986)
- 5 dni z życia emeryta (1985) TV series .... Namiastka
- Mrzonka (1985) (TV)
- Miłość z listy przebojów (1985) .... Gustaw
- Lata dwudzieste, lata trzydzieste (1984) .... Maksymilian Fuks
- Miłość ci wszystko wybaczy (1981) .... Comedian Tadeusz
- Cóżeś ty za pani... (1979) .... Jan Dobosz
- Hallo Szpicbródka, czyli ostatni występ Króla Kasiarzy (1978) .... Plainclothes Man Mankowski
- Brunet wieczorową porą (1976) .... Truck Driver
- Nie ma róży bez ognia (1974) .... Postman
- Czterdziestolatek .... Jasio (1 episode, 1974)
- Poszukiwany - poszukiwana (1973) .... Workman
- Kłopotliwy gość (1971) .... Doctor
- Pogoń za Adamem (1970) .... Film distributor
- Nowy (1970) .... Doctor
- Zmartwychwstanie Offlanda (1968) (TV) .... Sergeant Drue
- Piekło i niebo (1966) .... Screenwriter
- Wojna domowa .... Plumber's Boss (1 episode, 1966)
- Barbara i Jan .... Jan Buszewski, news photographer (7 episodes, 1965)
- Nowy pracownik (1966) .... Doctor
- Zawsze w niedzielę (1965) .... Trainer
- Żona dla Australijczyka (1964) .... Dealer
- Naprawdę wczoraj (1963) (uncredited) .... Waiter
- Smarkula (1963) .... Taxi Driver
- Złoto (1962) .... Waiter
- Guests Are Coming (1962) .... 3rd Episode
- Klub kawalerów (1962) .... Nieśmiałowski
- Kwiecień (1961) .... Paweł
- Szczęściarz Antoni (1961) .... Fijałkowski
- Ostrożnie, Yeti! (1961) .... Prisoner Playing the Violin
- Zamach (1959) .... Jurek
- Kalosze szczęścia (1958) .... Militiaman Franek 'Wazny'
- Ewa chce spać (1958) (uncredited) .... Marian
- Warszawska syrena (1956) .... Fisherman
- Godziny nadziei (1955)

=== Polish dubbing ===
- Baldur's Gate (1999, computer game) .... Narrator
- Baldur's Gate II (2001, computer game) .... Jan Jansen
- Sceny z życia smoków (1994–1997)
- Film pod strasznym tytułem (1992–1994)
- O dwóch takich, co ukradli księżyc (1984–1989) .... Narrator
- Przygód kilka wróbla Ćwirka (1983–1989) .... All characters
