= Tadeusz Chudecki =

Polish actor

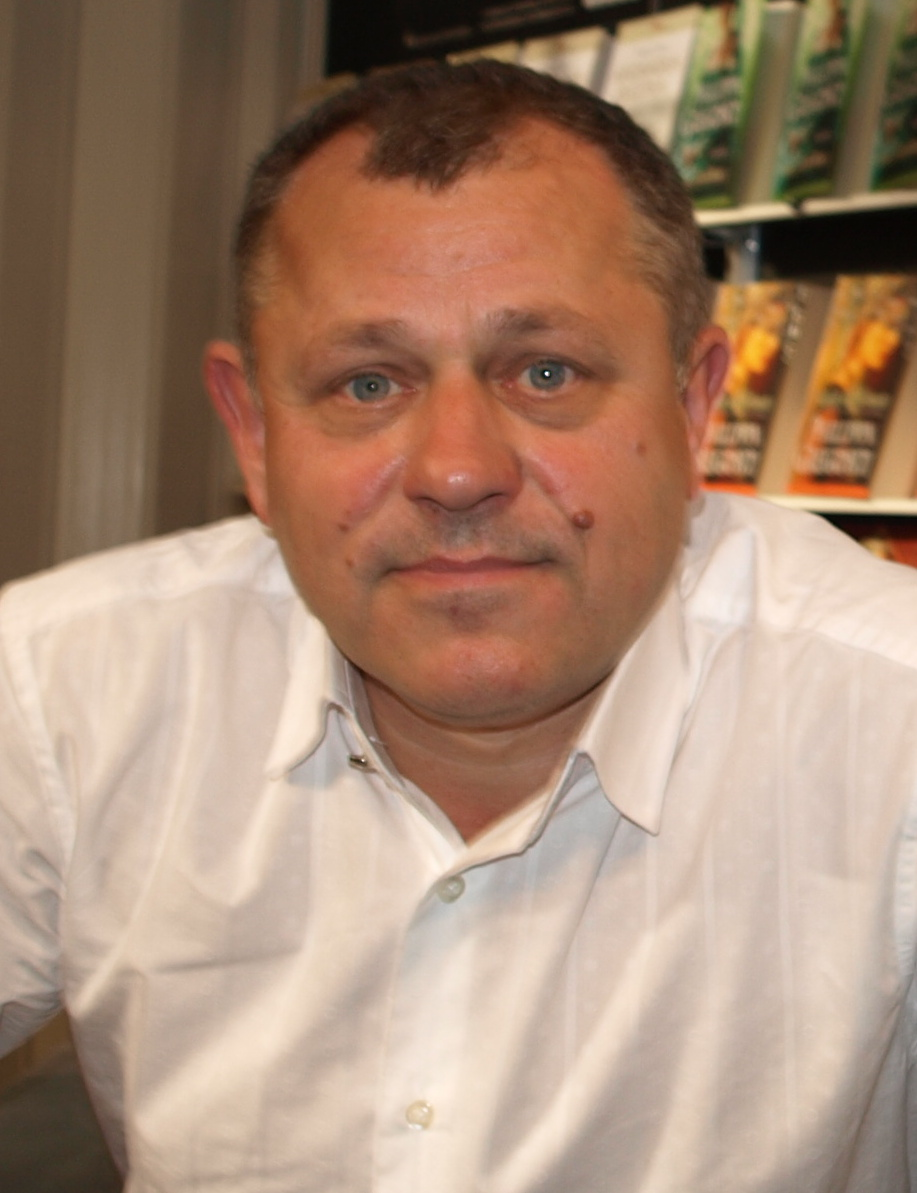
- Tadeusz Chudecki in 2011
- Born: 19 August 1958 (age 67); Szczecin, Poland
- Occupation: Actor

Tadeusz Chudecki (born 19 August 1958 in Szczecin) is a Polish actor. He appeared in the comedy television series Bao-Bab, czyli zielono mi in 2003.
