= Piotr Polk =

Polish actor

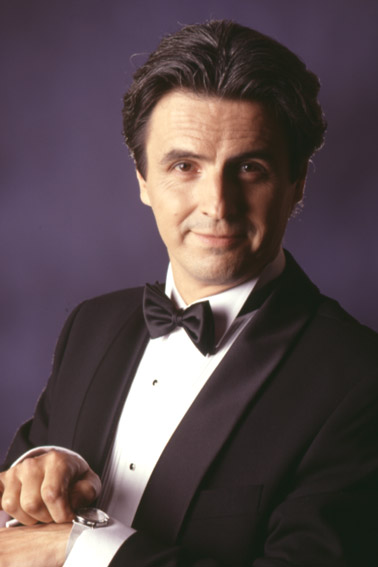
- Polk in 2008
- Born: 22 January 1962 (age 64); Kalety, Poland
- Education: National Film School in Łódź
- Occupations: Actor, singer
- Spouse(s): 1. Hanna Wrycza (divorced); 2. Magdalena Wołłejko (divorced)
- Musical career
- Genres: Pop
- Instruments: Piano, guitar, drums
- Label: QL Music

Piotr Polk (born 22 January 1962 in Kalety) is a Polish actor and singer. He portrayed Leo Rosner in the 1993 American film Schindler's List. He appeared in the comedy television series Bao-Bab, czyli zielono mi in 2003. He portrayed Paul Sheldon in a 2017 stage version of Misery.

== Discography ==
=== Studio albums ===
Title	Album details	Peak chart positions	Sales	Certifications
Title	Album details	POL	Sales	Certifications
Polk in Love	Released: 2 June 2008; Label: QL Music; Formats: CD, digital download	9	POL: 15,000+	POL: Gold
Mój film	Released: 24 January 2011; Label: QL Music; Formats: CD	—	POL: 15,000+	POL: Gold
"—" denotes a recording that did not chart or was not released in that territory.

=== Music videos ===
Title	Year	Album	Ref.
"L.O.V.E."	2008	Polk in Love	
"Jest świetnie"	2011	Mój film	
