= Wiktor Zborowski =

Polish actor

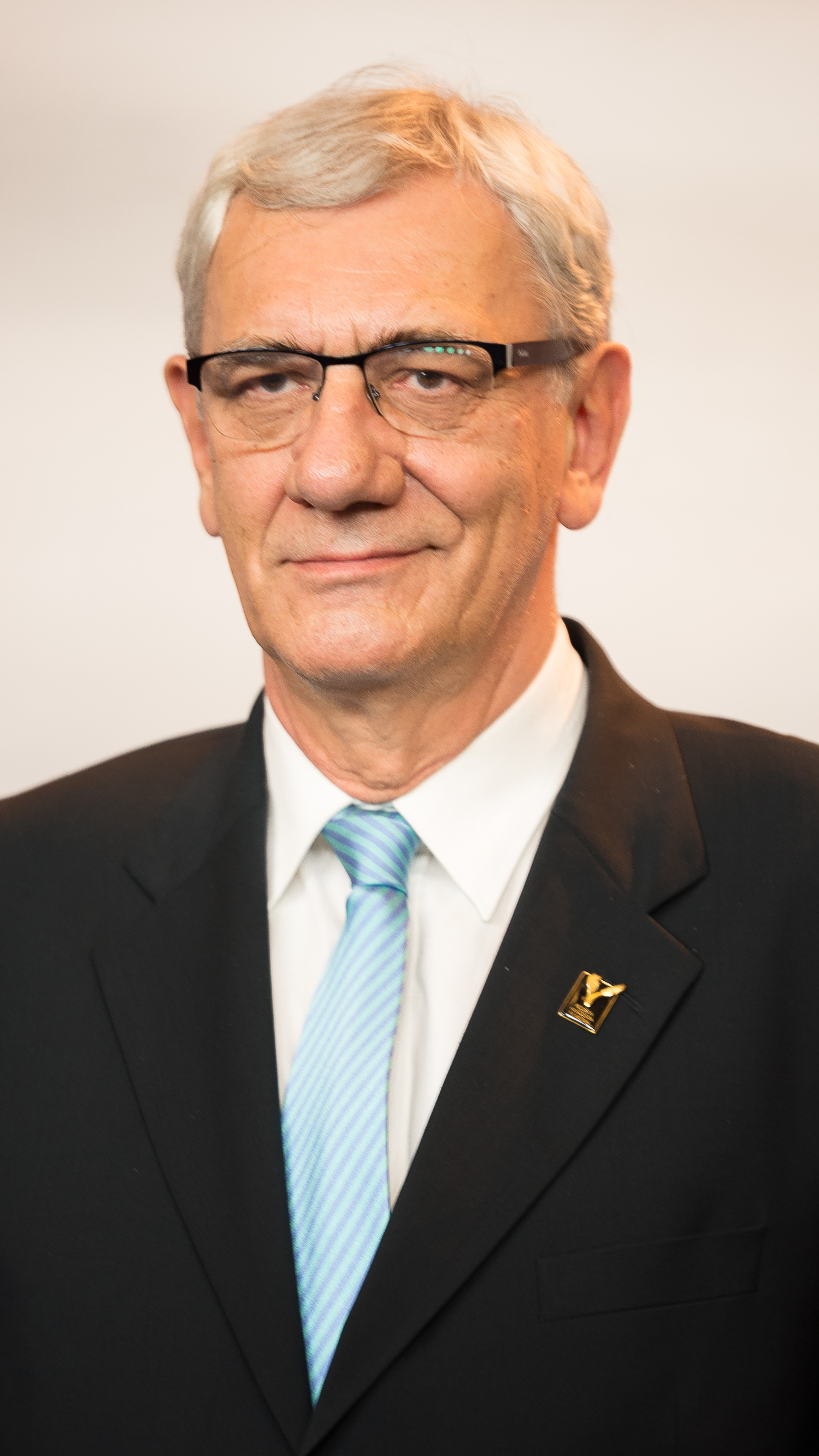
Wiktor Zborowski at the 2017 Berlinale

Wiktor Zborowski (born 10 January 1951 in Warsaw) is a Polish actor and singer. He is the nephew of actor Jan Kobuszewski. In 1973 he completed The Aleksander Zelwerowicz National Academy of Dramatic Art in Warsaw. He appeared in the comedy television series Bao-Bab, czyli zielono mi in 2003. He is also known for taking on the role of Longinus Podbipięta in the 1999 historical epic With Fire and Sword.

== Selected filmography ==
- Dawn (2015)
