= No Means No (film) =

Indo-Polish multilingual romantic thriller film

- Promotional poster
- Directed by: Vikash Verma
- Written by: Hitesh Desai
- Screenplay by: Vikash Verma
- Story by: Vikash Verma; Hitesh Desai
- Produced by: G7 Films Poland
- Starring: Dhruv Verma; Natalia Bak; Gulshan Grover; Sharad Kapoor; Anna Guzik; Deepraj Rana
- Cinematography: Michal Szewczuk
- Music by: Hariharan
- Production company: G7 Films Poland
- Release date: 18 December 2026
- Running time: 165 minutes
- Countries: India; Poland
- Languages: English; Hindi; Polish

No Means No (also known as Nie Means Nie) is an upcoming Indo-Polish romantic thriller film, which was shot simultaneously in three languages: English, Hindi and Polish. Produced by G7 Films Poland and directed by Vikash Verma, it stars Dhruv Verma, Gulshan Grover, Sharad Kapoor and Anna Guzik. The film follows an Indian ski champion (Dhruv Verma), who participates in a ski championship in Poland. There he falls in love with a Polish girl.

== Cast ==
- Dhruv Verma as Raj
- Natalia Bak as Kasia
- Sylvia Czech as Katarzyna
- Gulshan Grover as Raja
- Anna Guzik as Kinga Gora
- Katrina Kaif as Anushka
- Anna Ador as Saanjh
- Neetu Chandra as Neetu
- Sharad Kapoor as Shekhar Oberoi (Fake)
- Nazia Hussain as Leena D'Souza
- Deepraj Rana as Stallone
- Pawel Czech as Police Officer
- Milind Joshi as Judge
- Abhishek Bhatnagar as Antagonist
- Armaan Kohli as Shekhar Oberoi (Real)

== Music ==
The background music of the film is provided by Hariharan and his son Akshay Hariharan. Karan Hariharan, Javed Ali and Shreya Ghoshal are among the singers in the movie. Rishav Nagh has also made many of the songs in the film.

No.	Title	Singer(s)	Length
1.	Untitled	Shreya Ghoshal
2.	Untitled	Javed Ali

== Filming ==
"No Means No" is produced by G7 Films Poland and directed by Vikash Verma as first Indo-Polish film. Michal Szewczuk is the Cinematographer.

No Means No is 80% filmed in Poland and 20% in India. It has been a goal for India and Poland to strengthen bilateral relations through the movie industry.

== Release ==
The film was originally slated for release on 22 March 2021, but postponed due to the COVID-19 pandemic in India. but release was again pushed back to 17 June 2022. The film was expected to release on 26 July 2024. The film was scheduled to be released on 20 December 2024. The film's release has been moved to December 18, 2026.

In July 2025, Steven Seagal announced that his production company, Steamroller Productions, would collaborate with Vikash Verma's G7 Films on the project, as part of a broader agreement between the two companies.
