= Bao-Bab, czyli zielono mi =

Polish comedy television series

- Genre: Comedy
- Screenplay by: Przemysław Angerman; Marcin Cząba; Piotr Jasek; Dariusz Hyska
- Directed by: Jan Kidawa-Błoński; Krzysztof Lang
- Starring: Krzysztof Kowalewski; Mirosław Baka; Tadeusz Chudecki; Marian Glinka; Tomasz Karolak; Piotr Polk; Wiktor Zborowski; Anja Antonowicz; Patrycja Durska; Anna Guzik; Magdalena Różczka; Małgorzata Socha; Katarzyna Skrzynecka
- Composer: Zbigniew Raj
- Country of origin: Poland
- Original language: Polish
- No. of seasons: 1
- No. of episodes: 12

Production
- Cinematography: Andrzej Wolf
- Running time: 35 min

Original release
- Network: TVP1
- Release: 14 March – 13 June 2003

Bao-Bab, czyli zielono mi is a Polish comedy television series broadcast in 2003. 12 episodes were aired on TVP1. It was directed by Jan Kidawa-Błoński and Krzysztof Lang and revolves around the adventures of the first female unit in the Polish army.

== Cast and characters ==
Actor	Role
Krzysztof Kowalewski	General Mamoń
Mirosław Baka	Sergeant Makuła
Tadeusz Chudecki	Junior ensign Zdzisław Snopek
Marian Glinka	Colonel Kucejko
Tomasz Karolak	Private Pilaszko
Piotr Polk	Chaplain lieutenant Brzęczyk
Wiktor Zborowski	plumber Wiesio Danielak
Anja Antonowicz	"Bąbel"
Patrycja Durska	Soldier
Anna Guzik	Marianna "Koniu" Wyspiańska
Magdalena Różczka	"Moro"
Małgorzata Socha	Izabela "Bjuti" Lisocka
Katarzyna Skrzynecka	Colonel Carol Kowalsky
