= Anna Guzik =

Polish actress (born 1976)

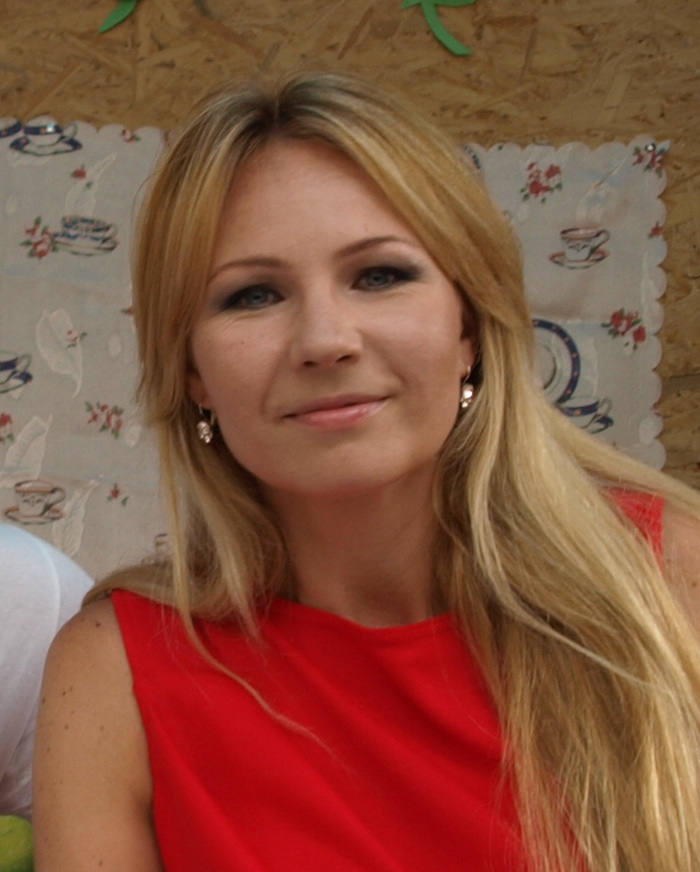
- Born: 15 August 1976 (age 49); Bielsko-Biała, Poland
- Years active: 1999 – present

Anna Guzik (born 1976 in Katowice, Poland) is a Polish actress.

She is the winner of the 6th edition of Dancing With The Stars.

== Filmography ==
- 1999: Krugerandy
- 2002: Król przedmieścia
- 2003: Bao-Bab, czyli zielono mi
- 2003: Ciało
- 2005: Klinika samotnych serc
- 2005–present: Na Wspólnej
- 2006: Wędrowiec
- 2006-2008: Hela w opałach
- 2007: Benek
- 2008: Magiczne drzewo
- 2008: Expecting love
- 2008: Agentki
- 2026: No Means No

== Entertainment ==
- 2006 - Kuba Wojewódzki (talk-show) - with Weronika Rosati
- 2007 - Szymon Majewski Show - with Bohdan Łazuka
- 2007 - Dzień Kangura - with Zbigniew Buczkowski
- 2007 - Taniec z Gwiazdami - in pair with Łukasz Czarnecki
- 2007 - Studio Złote Tarasy - hospitably in interview with Łukasz Czarnecki
- 2007- You Can Dance - Po prostu tańcz - with Adam Fidusiewicz in finale of 1st edition
- 2007 - Po prostu taniec - with partner Rafał "Roofi" Kamiński
- 2008 - Się kręci - with Michał Lesień, Krzysztof Respondek and Piotr Wereśniak
- 2008 - in 4th edition of Jak Oni Śpiewają was guest of Artur Chamski
- 2009 - alleZIMA! - hospitably on a ski slope in Szczawnica
- 2009 - Taniec z Gwiazdami - hospitably with Agata Kulesza
- 2010 - alleZIMA! - hospitably with team from Na Wspólnej
- 2010 - Kocham Cię Polsko! - with Urszula Dudziak and Jan Mela

Preceded by Krzysztof Tyniec & Kamila Kajak	Dancing with the Stars (Polish TV series) winner Season 6 (Autumn 2007 with Łukasz Czarnecki)	Succeeded by Magdalena Walach & Cezary Olszewski
