= Sandra Lewandowska =

Polish politician (born 1977)

Member of Sejm
- In office 18 October 2005 – 5 November 2007

Personal details
- Born: 1977 (age 48–49)
- Party: Samoobrona

Sandra Magdalena Lewandowska (born 8 June 1977) is a Polish parliamentarian who served in the national Parliament (Sejm) of the Republic of Poland of the V Sejm cadency from September 2005 to October 2007. As a Member of Parliament, she was a Member of Environmental Protection, Natural Resources and Forestry Committee, Enterprise Development Committee and Administration and Interior Affairs Committee. She was a Chairperson of Poland–USA Bilateral Parliamentary Group and a Member of Poland–Great Britain Bilateral Parliamentary Group. She specialized in Environmental Protection and Renewable Energy Resources. She was also a vice-chairperson of the Program Committee of the Polish Television S.A. in Opole 2006–2010.

== Educational background ==
A native of the city of Jelenia Góra, then the seat of Jelenia Góra Voivodeship and, since 1999, part of the Lower Silesian Voivodeship, Sandra Magdalena Lewandowska studied "enterprise management" at the Regional and Tourist Economy Department of Wrocław University of Economics, graduating in 2002 with a major in business operations.

== Political career ==
Although initially associated with the Democratic Left Alliance, she was also a member, from 1999 to 2001, of Polish Socialist Youth Union and, between October 2001 and October 2004, was a leader in the Alliance's Jelenia Góra youth chapter as well as deputy leader of the city's Stowarzyszenie Młodej Lewicy Demokratycznej [Young Democratic Left Association]. During 2002–04 she worked at the Ministry of Interior and Administration and, concurrently, from March 2002 to December 2003, was an assistant at the political office of cabinet member Krzysztof Janik, the Minister of Interior and Administration. Also, from January to June 2004, she served as the chief advisor in the Ministry's Office of Social Communication. She was an organizer of parliamentary debates on national security issues, including the benefits and risks connected with the installation of elements of the American anti- ballistic missile (ABM) defense system on Polish territory. She participated in a research trip to the United States that included a visit to the U.S. Missile Defense Agency (MDA) in Washington, D.C., with representatives of the Polish Embassy. In July 2005, at the age of 28, she joined the Self-Defense of the Republic of Poland Party and, in the September 25 election, having received 5215 votes, became one of the Party's 56 representatives in the 460-member Sejm during the legislative body's 5th term. Placed by the Party in the constituency covering Opole Voivodeship, she was assigned to the Committee for Defense of the Environment, Natural Resources and Forestry as well as to the Committee for Entrepreneurial Growth.

Her newfound celebrity/notoriety resulted in an invitation to participate in the 6th season of Taniec z gwiazdami, partnered by professional dancer Michał Skawiński. The show's premiere broadcast was on 9 September, with her elimination, ranked in 13th place, coming in the second installment. Political reckoning came the following month with the October 21 election to the Sejm, held only two years and one month after the previous one, in which the Self-Defense Party received less than 5% of the vote, thus losing all of its 56 seats in the Sejm.

== See also ==
- Members of Polish Sejm 2005-2007
